= List of the prehistoric life of Maryland =

This list of the prehistoric life of Maryland contains the various prehistoric life-forms whose fossilized remains have been reported from within the US state of Maryland.

== Precambrian ==
The Paleobiology Database records no known occurrences of Precambrian fossils in Maryland.

== Paleozoic ==
=== Selected Paleozoic taxa of Maryland ===
- †Amphiscapha
- †Amplexopora
- †Archimylacris
- †Atrypa
  - †Atrypa reticularis – report made of unidentified related form or using admittedly obsolete nomenclature
- †Aviculopecten
- †Bassipterus
- †Bellerophon
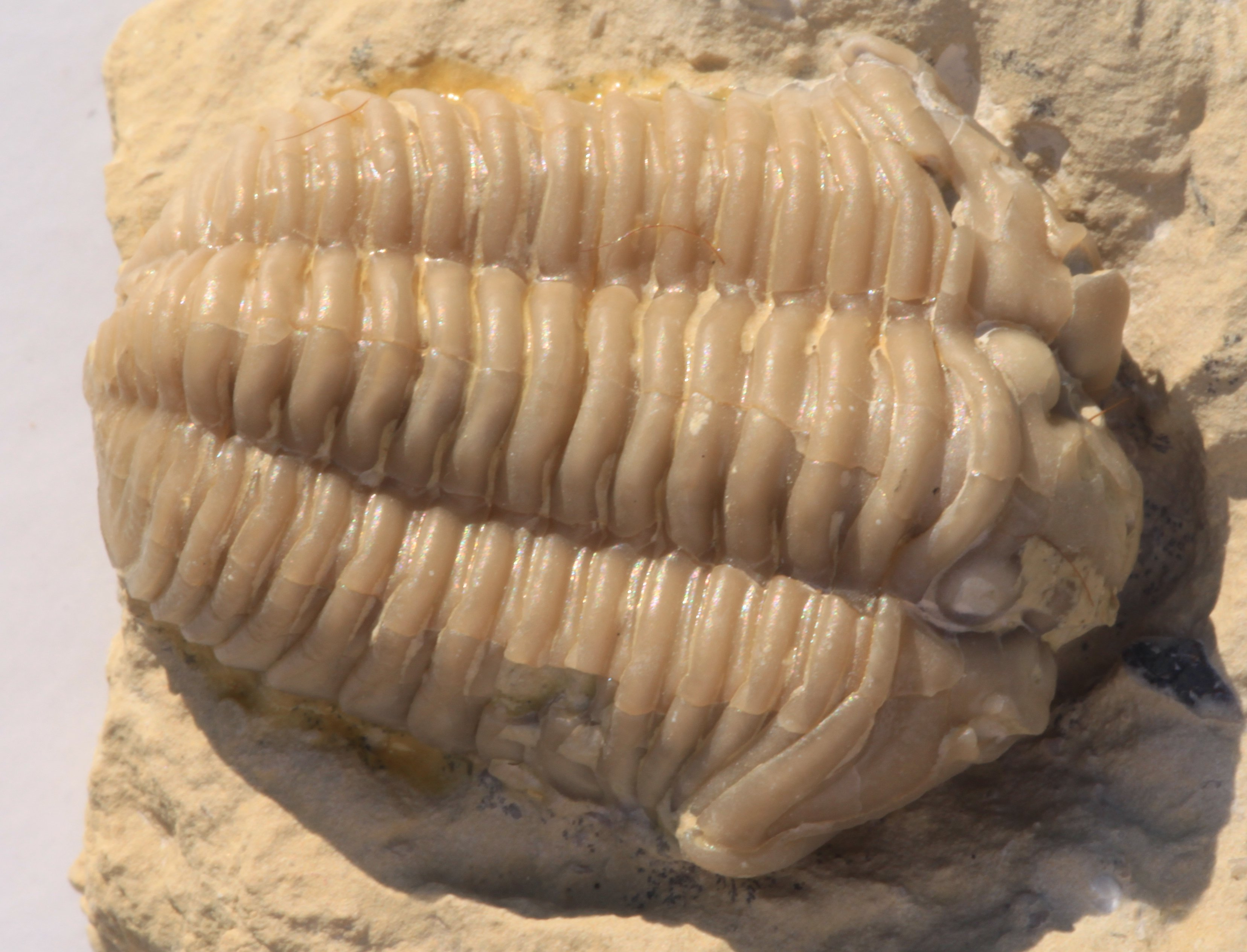
- Fossil of the Early Ordovician-Early Devonian trilobite Calymene
  †Calymene
  - †Calymene camerata
  - †Calymene cresapensis
  - †Calymene niagarensis – or unidentified comparable form
- †Camarotoechia
  - †Camarotoechia andrewsi
  - †Camarotoechia litchfieldensis
  - †Camarotoechia tonolowayensis
- †Chonetes
  - †Chonetes novascoticus
- †Cincinnetina
  - †Cincinnetina multisecta
- †Clitendoceras
- †Composita
  - †Composita ovata – tentative report
- †Cornulites
- †Cypricardinia
  - †Cypricardinia elegans
- †Dakeoceras
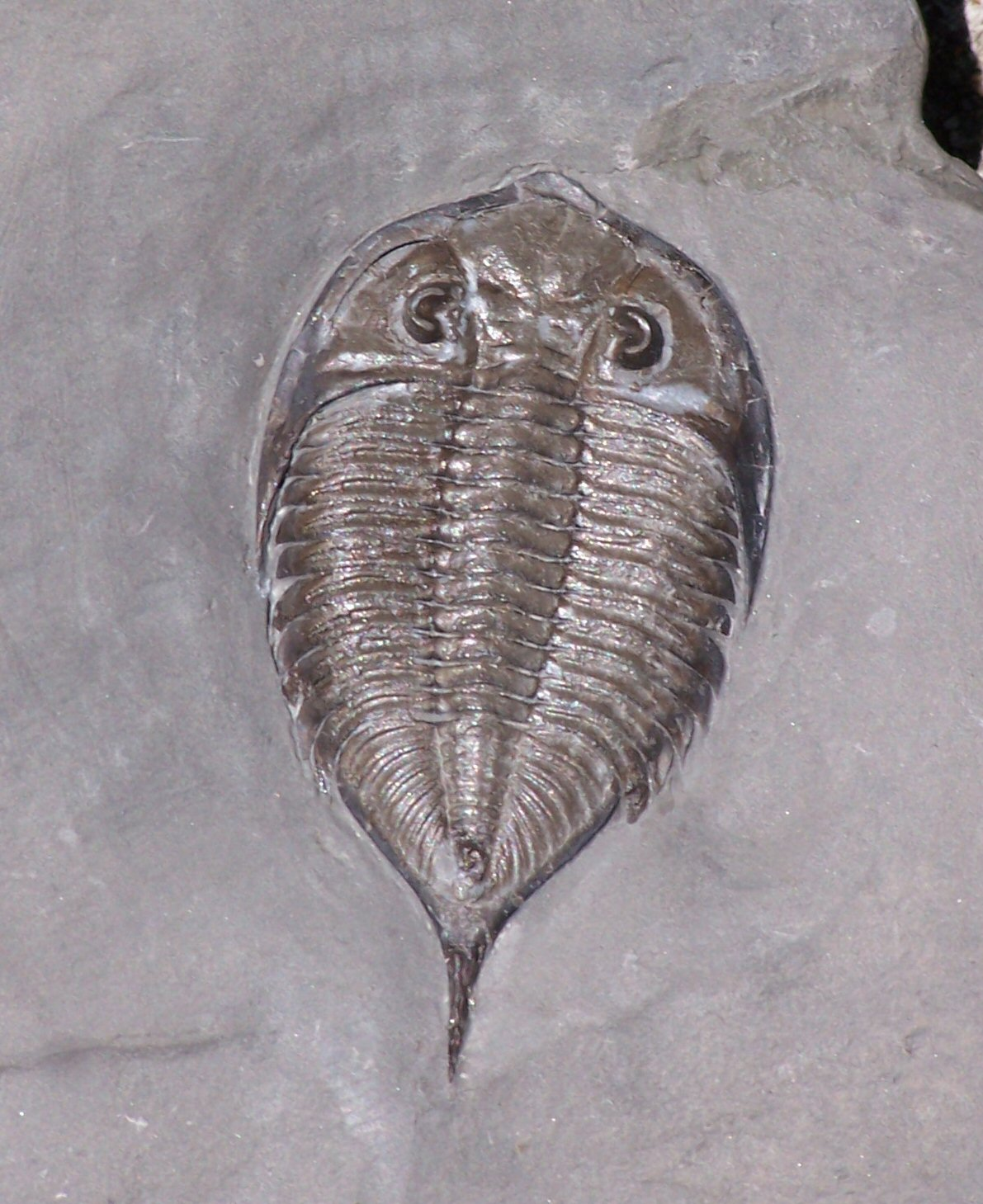
- Fossil of the Late Ordovician-Middle Devonian trilobite Dalmanites
  †Dalmanites
  - †Dalmanites limulurus
- †Dolichopterus
- †Edmondia
- †Eldredgeops
  - †Eldredgeops rana
- †Ellesmeroceras
- †Encrinurus
- †Eospirifer
- †Erettopterus – tentative report
- †Euomphalus
- †Eurypterus
  - †Eurypterus remipes
- †Favosites
  - †Favosites niagarensis – or unidentified comparable form
- †Flexicalymene
- †Goniatites
- †Gyrodoma
- †Hallopora
- †Holopea
- †Hyolithes
- †Isotelus
- †Lingula
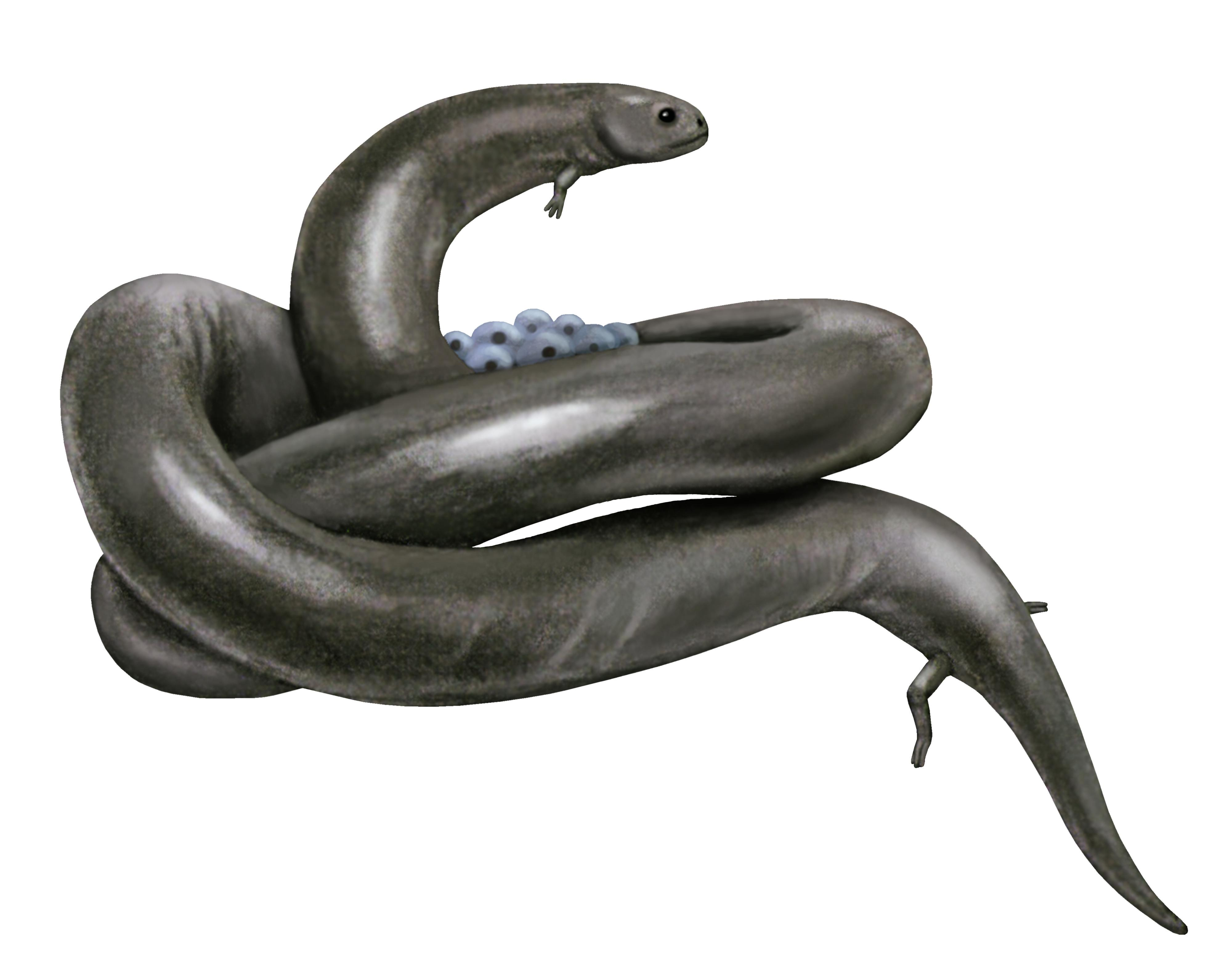
- Life restoration of the Permian snake-like amphibian Lysorophus showing speculative egg-coiling behavior
  †Lysorophus
- †Mcqueenoceras
- †Megamolgophis
- †Meristina
- †Metacoceras
- †Naticopsis
- †Neospirifer
  - †Neospirifer dunbari – tentative report
- †Obolella
- †Obolus – tentative report
- †Olenellus
- †Ormoceras
- †Orthoceras
- †Platyceras
- †Proterocameroceras
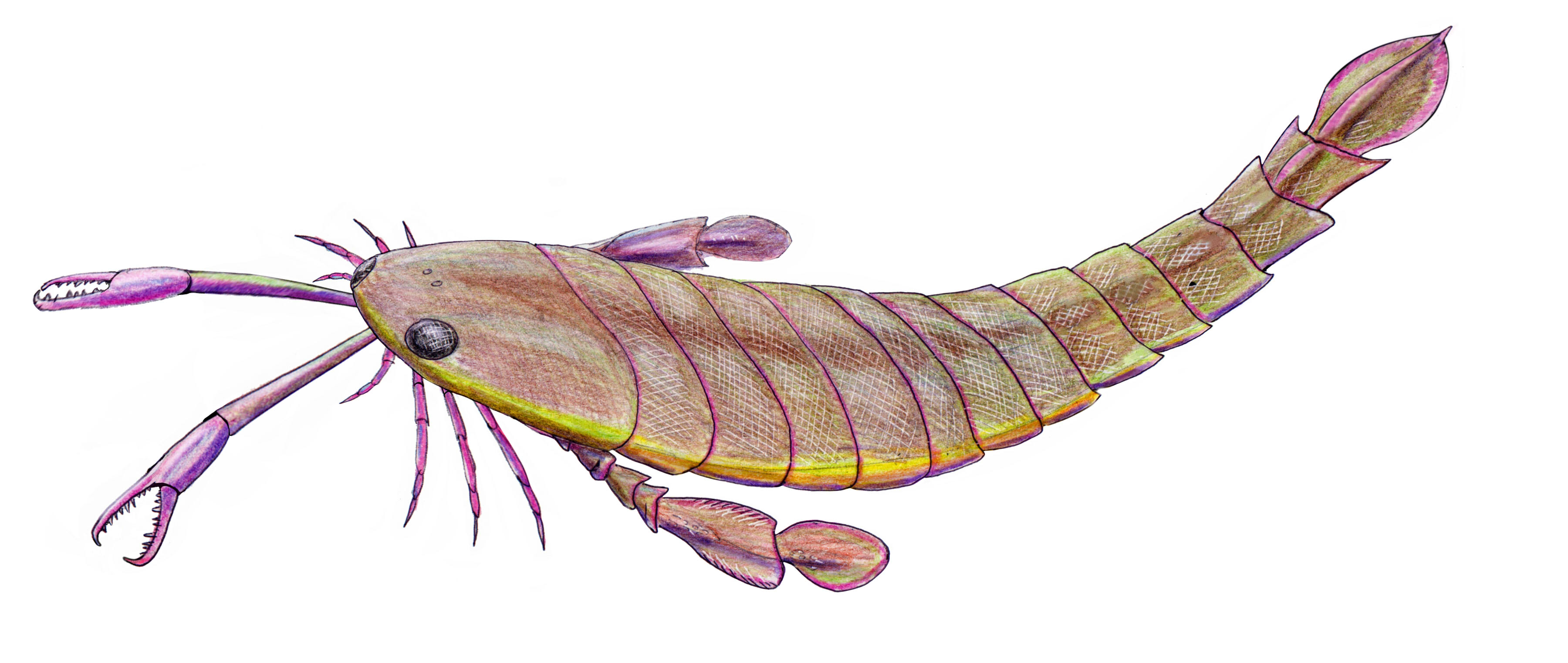
- Life restoration of the Silurian-Middle Devonian eurypterid ("sea scorpion") Pterygotus
  †Pterygotus
- †Ribeiria
- †Rioceras
- Solemya
- † Solenopsis
- †Sowerbyella
- †Spirifer
  - †Spirifer vanuxemi
- †Stenosiphon
- †Strophomena
- †Tainoceras
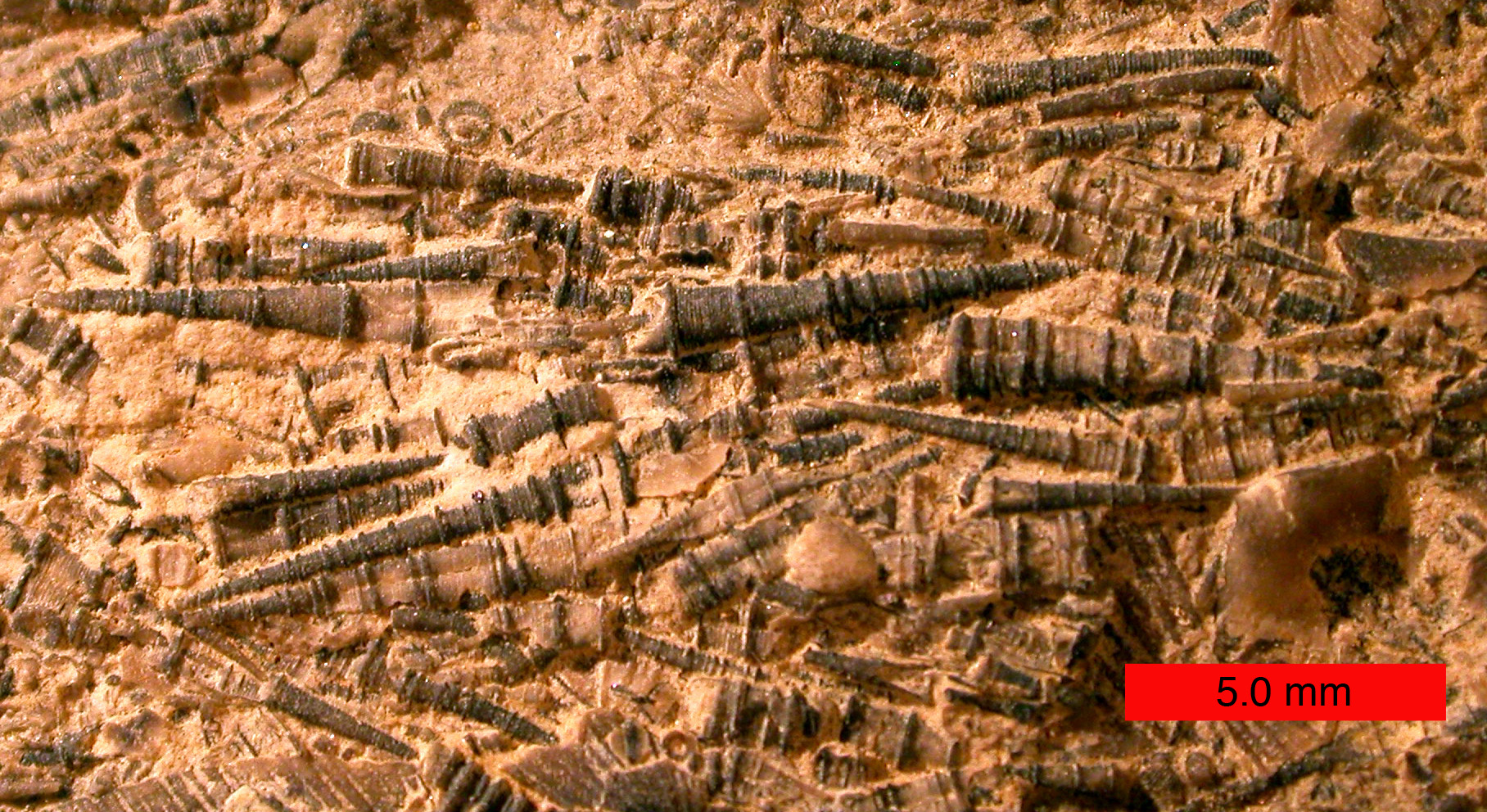
- Assemblage of fossilized shells of the Early Ordovician-Late Devonian probable mollusc Tentaculites
  †Tentaculites
- †Trigonocera
- †Trimerus
- †Waeringopterus
- †Worthenia

== Mesozoic ==
=== Selected Mesozoic taxa of Maryland ===
- Acirsa
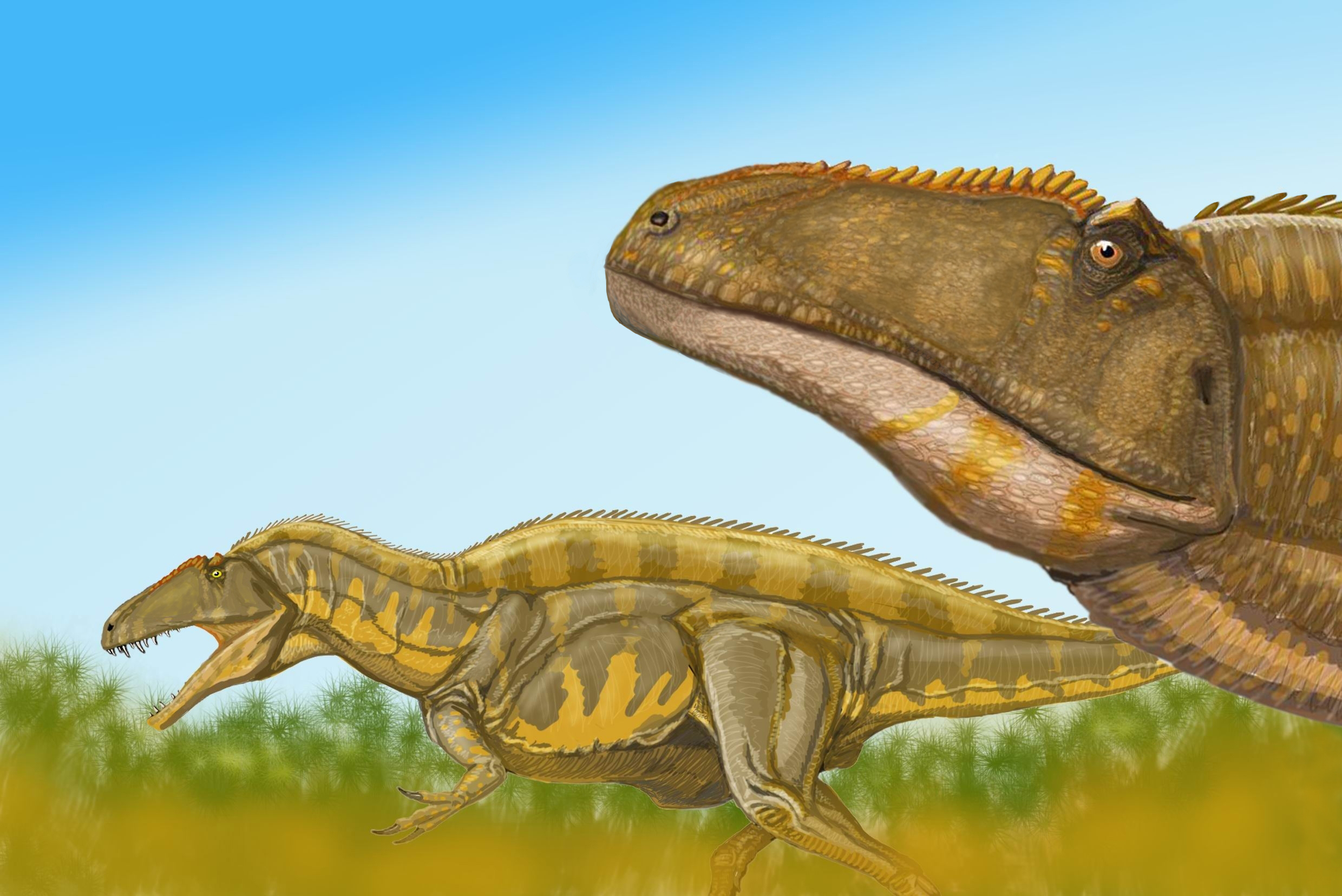
- Life restoration of the Early Cretaceous theropod dinosaur Acrocanthosaurus
  †Acrocanthosaurus – or unidentified comparable form
- †Acteon
- †Aenona
- †Agerostrea
- †Allognathosuchus – or unidentified comparable form
- †Allosaurus
- †Amyda
- †Ancilla
- †Anomia
- †Anomoeodus
- Arrhoges
- Astarte
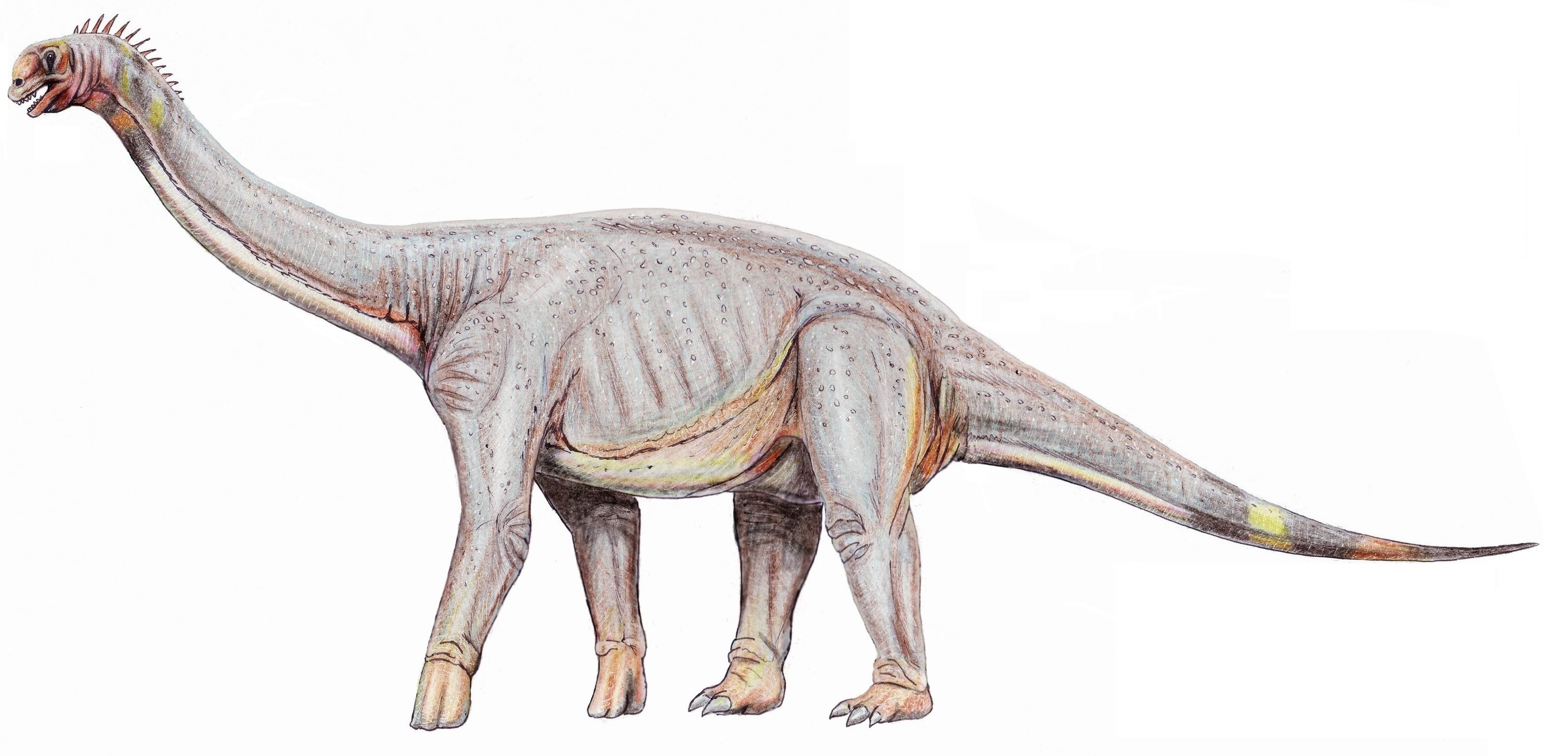
- Life restoration of the Early Cretaceous sauropod dinosaur Astrodon
  †Astrodon
  - †Astrodon johnstoni – type locality for species
- †Baculites
  - †Baculites baculus
- †Bottosaurus
  - †Bottosaurus harlani
- Botula
  - †Botula conchafodentis
  - †Botula ripleyana
- Cadulus
- Caestocorbula
  - †Caestocorbula crassaplica
  - †Caestocorbula crassiplica
  - †Caestocorbula percompressa
  - †Caestocorbula terramaria
- Carcharias
- †Caveola
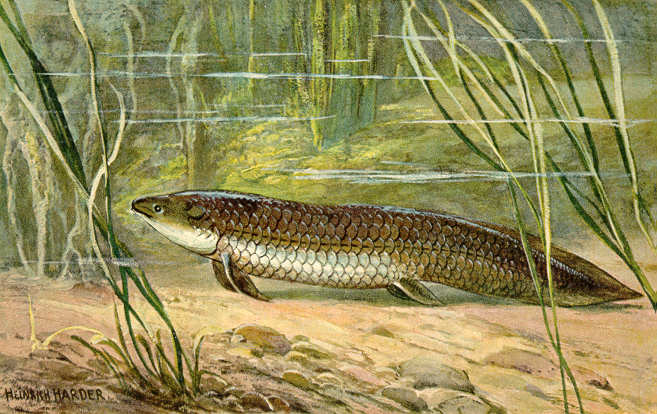
- Life restoration of the Late Triassic-Eocene lungfish Ceratodus
  †Ceratodus
- Cerithium
- Chiloscyllium
- †Cimoliasaurus
- †Coelosaurus
  - †Coelosaurus affinis
  - †Coelosaurus antiquus
- †Coelurus
  - †Coelurus gracilis – type locality for species
- †Corax
- Corbula
- †Crenella
  - †Crenella elegantula
  - †Crenella serica
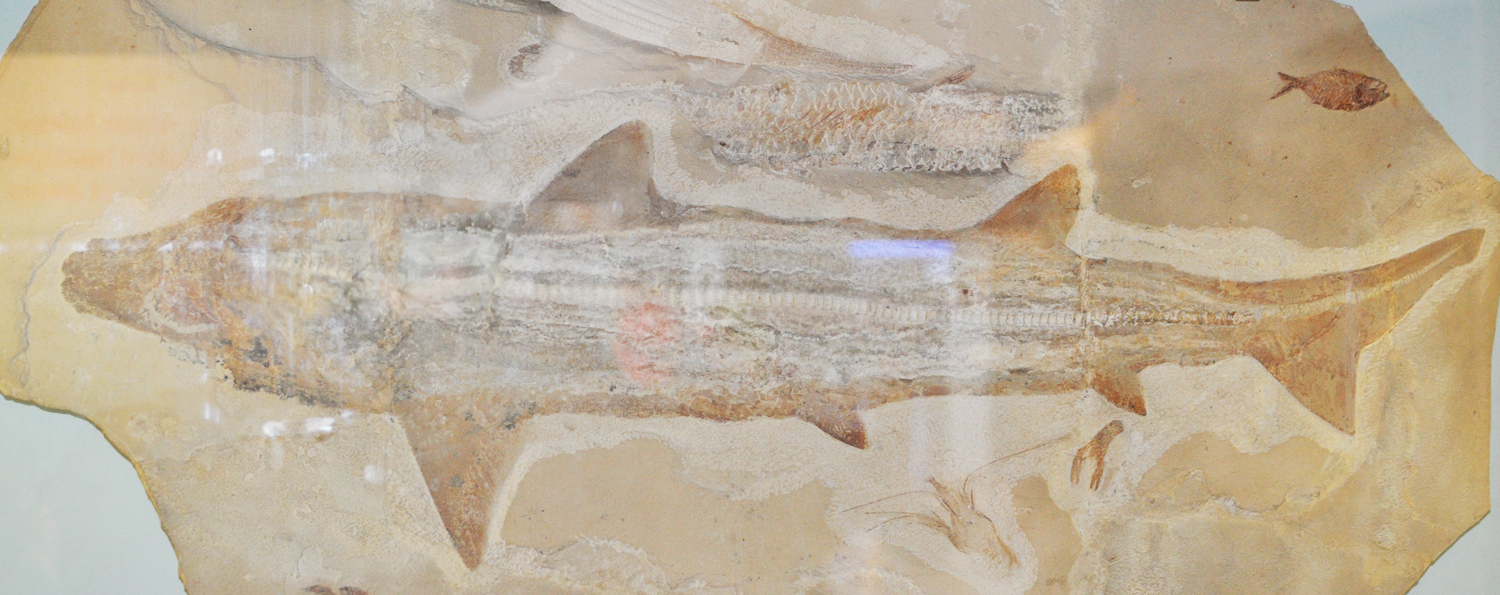
- Fossil of the Early Cretaceous-Eocene shark Cretolamna
  †Cretolamna
  - †Cretolamna appendiculata
- Cucullaea
  - †Cucullaea capax
- Cuspidaria
  - †Cuspidaria ampulla
- Cylichna
  - †Cylichna diversilirata
  - †Cylichna incisa
- †Cylindracanthus
- †Cymella
- Dasyatis
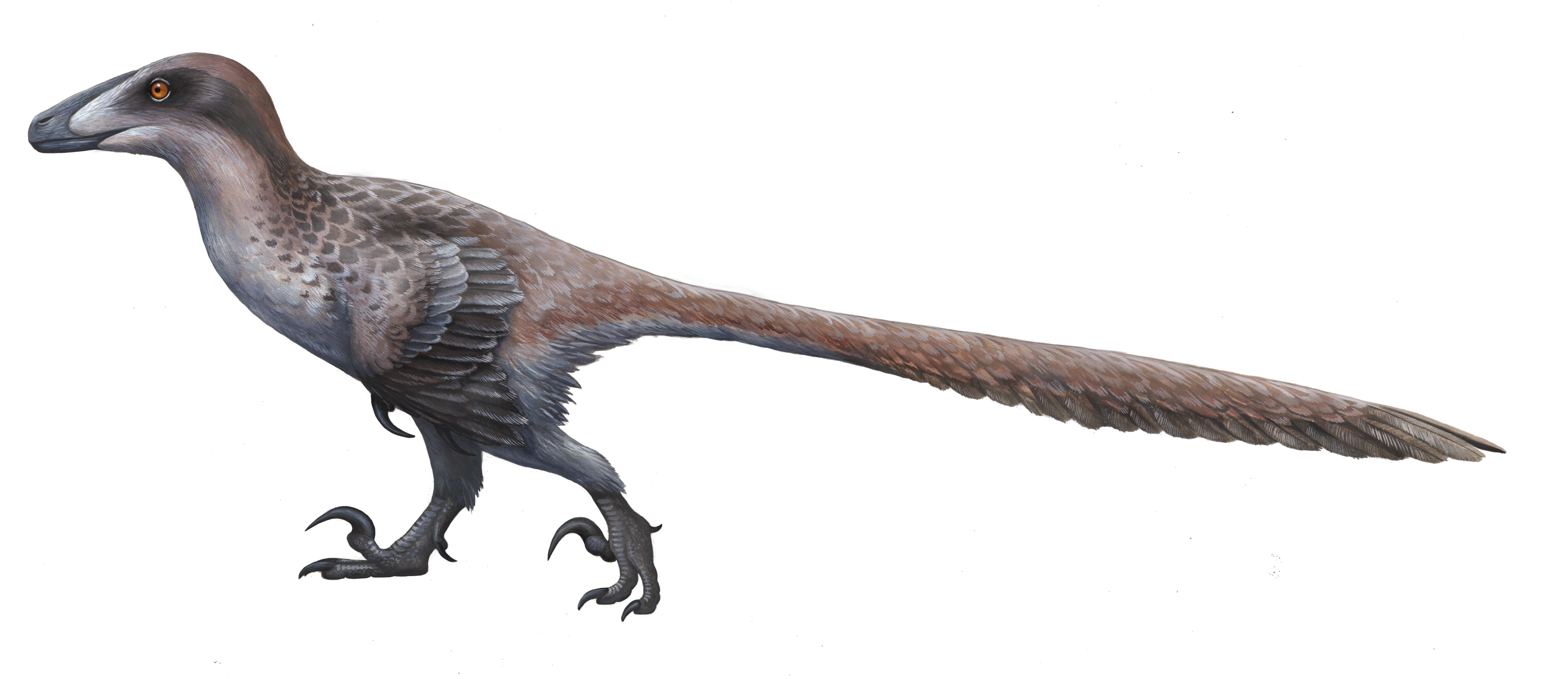
- Life restoration of the Early Cretaceous dromaeosaur ("raptor") Deinonychus
  †Deinonychus
  - †Deinonychus antirrhopus
- †Deinosuchus
  - †Deinosuchus rugosus
- †Dentalium
  - †Dentalium leve
- †Discoscaphites
  - †Discoscaphites conradi
  - †Discoscaphites gulosus
  - †Discoscaphites iris
- †Egertonia
- †Enchodus
  - †Enchodus dirus
- †Eulima
  - †Eulima monmouthensis
- †Euspira
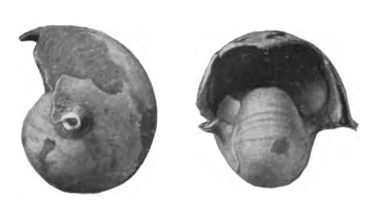
- Illustration in multiple views of a fossilized shell of the Late Jurassic-Miocene nautiloid cephalopod Eutrephoceras
  †Eutrephoceras
- †Ewingia
- †Exogyra
  - †Exogyra costata
- Galeorhinus
- Ginglymostoma
- Glossus
- Glycimeris
- Glycymeris
  - †Glycymeris rotundata
- †Glyptops
- †Goniopholis
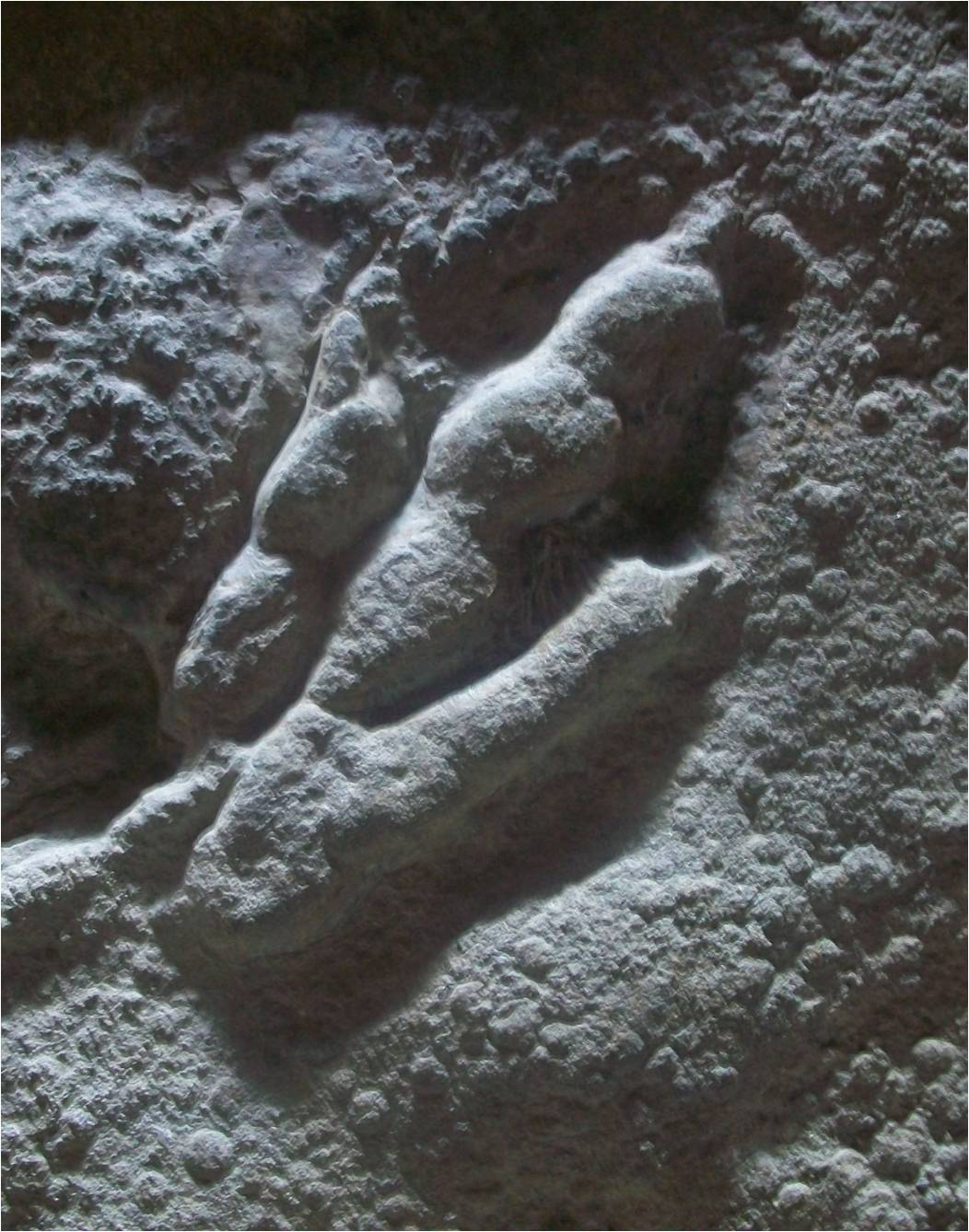
- Fossil negative with skin impressions of the theropod dinosaur footprint ichnogenus Grallator
  †Grallator – or unidentified comparable form
- †Halisaurus
  - †Halisaurus platyspondylus
- †Hamatia – type locality for genus
- †Hamulus
- Heterodontus
- † Heteromorpha
- †Hoploparia
- †Hybodus
- †Hyposaurus
  - †Hyposaurus rogersii
- †Inoceramus
- †Ischyodus
- †Ischyrhiza
  - †Ischyrhiza avonicola – or unidentified comparable form
  - †Ischyrhiza mira
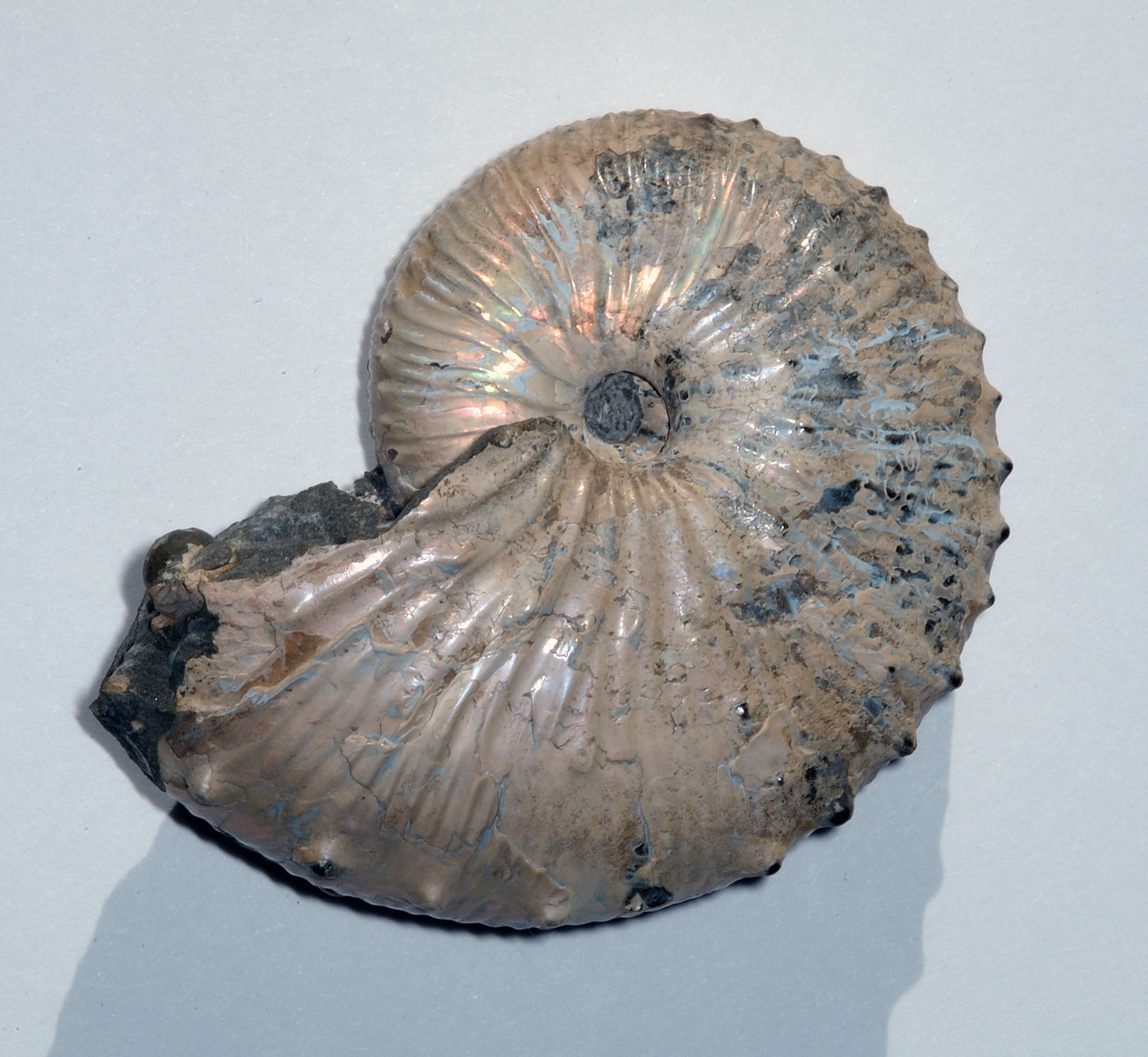
- Fossilized shell of the Late Cretaceous ammonoid cephalopod Jeletzkytes
  †Jeletzkytes
  - †Jeletzkytes nebrascensis
- Latiaxis
- Lepisosteus
- Lima
- Limatula
- †Linearis
- Lithophaga
- Lopha
  - †Lopha falcata
  - †Lopha mesenterica
- †Mathilda
- †Modiolus
  - †Modiolus sedesclaris
  - †Modiolus sedesclarus
  - †Modiolus trigonus
- †Morea
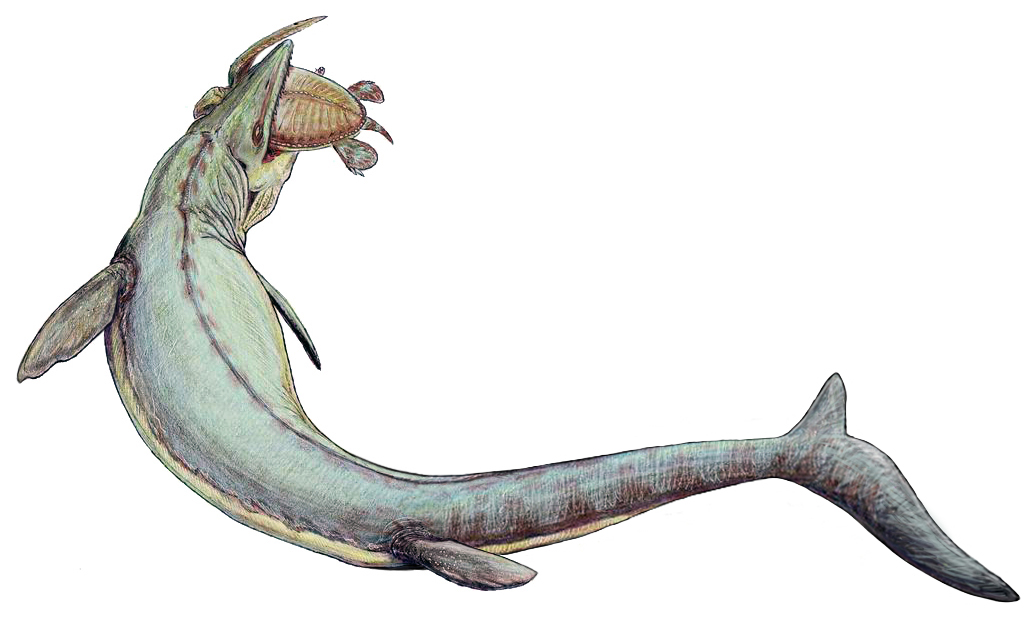
- Life restoration of two of the Late Cretaceous Mosasaurus
  †Mosasaurus
  - †Mosasaurus conodon
- Myliobatis
- †Mytilus – tentative report
- Nebrius
- Nucula
  - †Nucula camia
  - †Nucula cuneifrons
  - †Nucula percrassa
  - †Nucula severnensis
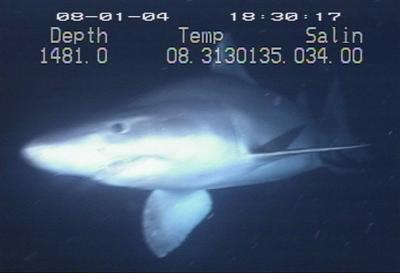
- A living Odontaspis sand shark
  Odontaspis
- †Osteopygis
- Panopea
- †Paralbula
- †Peritresius
- Pholas
- †Pinna
- †Placenticeras
- †Pleurocoelus – type locality for genus
  - †Pleurocoelus nanus – type locality for species
- †Plicatoscyllium
- Polinices
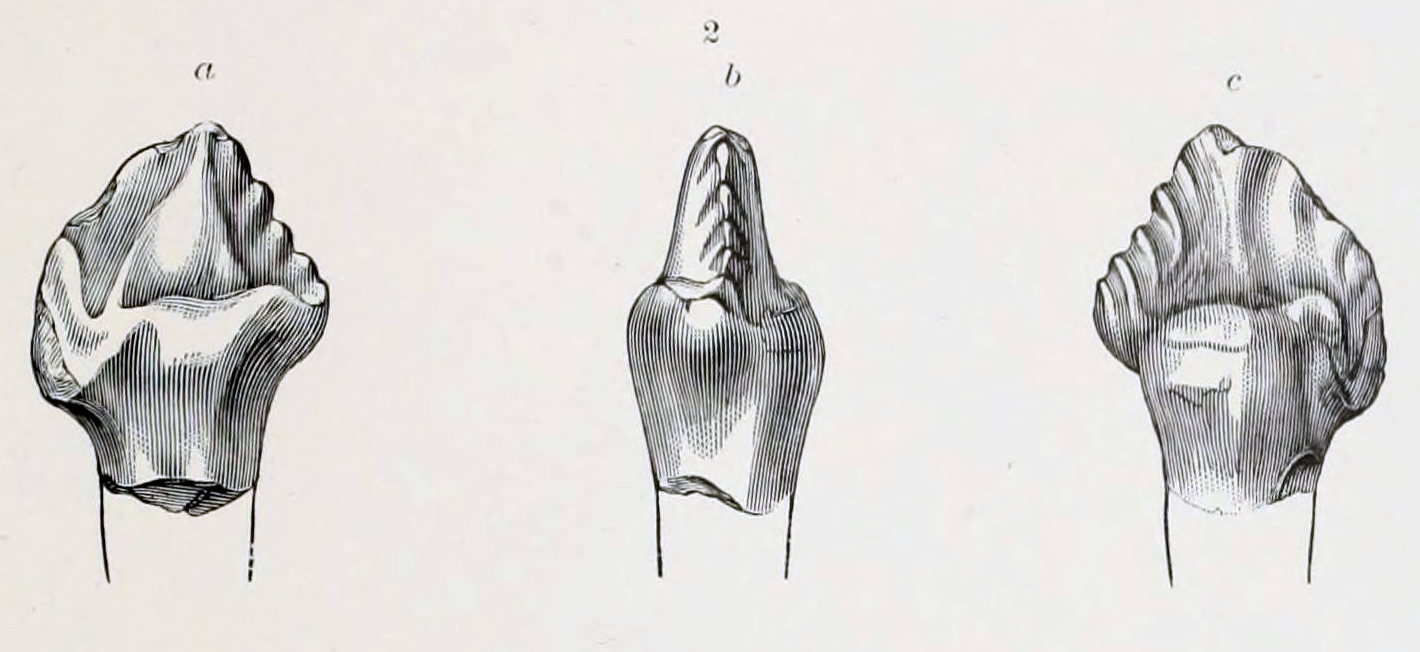
- Illustration of a fossilized tooth in multiple views of the Early Cretaceous armored dinosaur Priconodon
  †Priconodon – type locality for genus
  - †Priconodon crassus – type locality for species
- †Prognathodon
  - †Prognathodon rapax
- †Propanoplosaurus – type locality for genus
  - †Propanoplosaurus marylandicus – type locality for species
- †Protocardia
- †Pteria
- †Pterotrigonia
  - †Pterotrigonia eufalensis
  - †Pterotrigonia eufaulensis
  - †Pterotrigonia thoracica
- †Ptychotrygon
- Pycnodonte
  - †Pycnodonte vesicularis
- Raja
- Rhinobatos
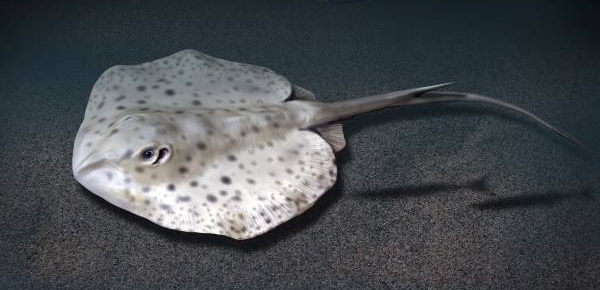
- Restoration of the Late Cretaceous-Paleocene ray Rhombodus
  †Rhombodus
- Ringicula
  - †Ringicula clarki
  - †Ringicula pulchella
- Rissoina
- †Sargana
- †Scaphites
  - †Scaphites hippocrepis
- Serpula
- †Serratolamna
  - †Serratolamna serrata
- †Sphenodiscus
  - †Sphenodiscus lobatus
  - †Sphenodiscus pleurisepta
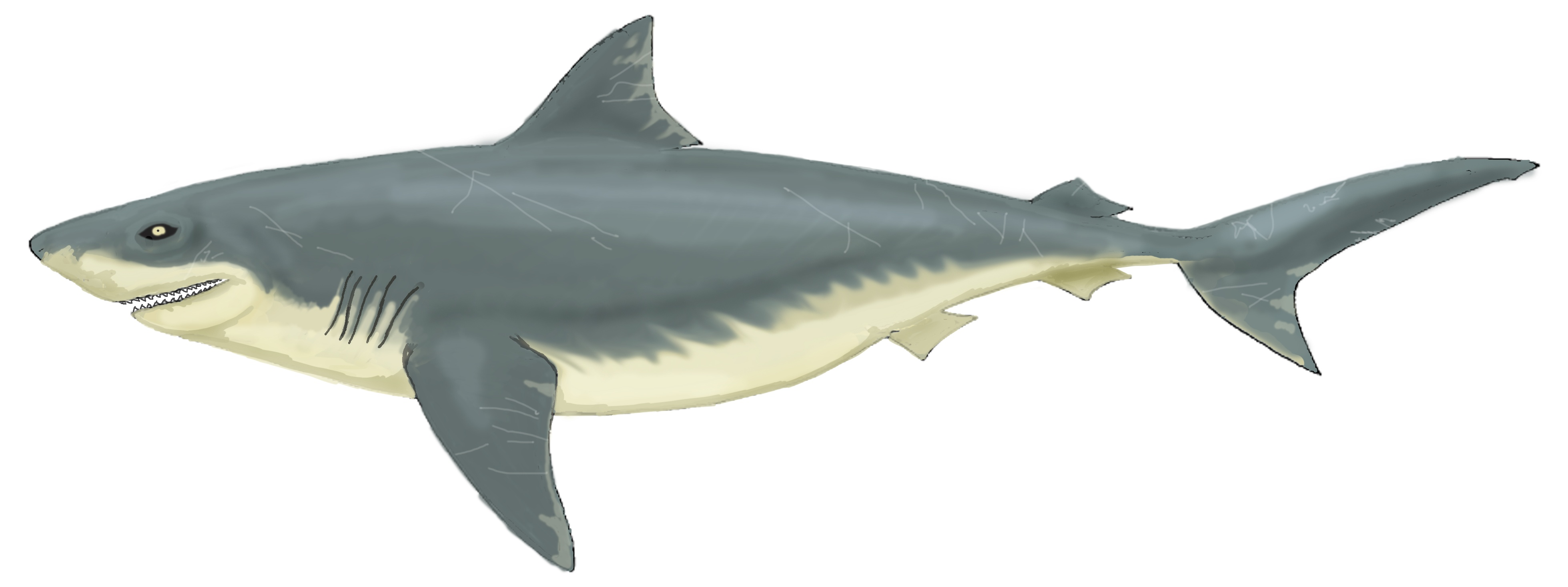
- Life restoration of the Late Cretaceous shark Squalicorax
  Squalicorax
  - †Squalicorax falcatus
  - †Squalicorax kaupi
  - †Squalicorax pristodontus
- Squatina
- †Stephanodus
- Tellina
- †Tenea
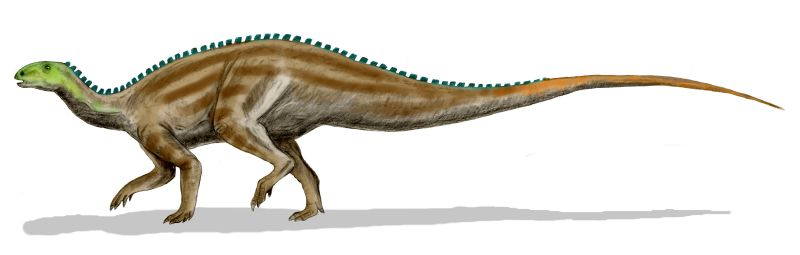
- Life restoration of the Early Cretaceous Iguanodon relative Tenontosaurus
  †Tenontosaurus
- †Thoracosaurus
- Trachycardium
  - †Trachycardium eufaulensis
- Turritella
  - †Turritella bilira
  - †Turritella hilgardi
  - †Turritella paravertebroides
  - †Turritella tippana
  - †Turritella trilira
  - †Turritella vertebroides
  - †Zephyrosaurus

== Cenozoic ==
=== Selected Cenozoic taxa of Maryland ===
- †Abra – tentative report
- Acipenser
- Acropora
  - †Acropora palmata
- Acteocina
- Acteon
- †Adocus
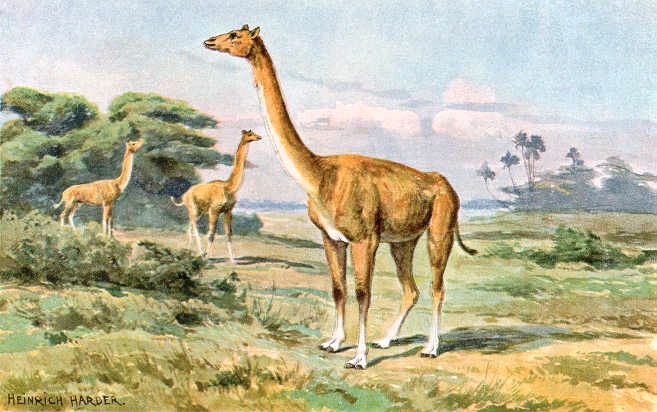
- Life restoration of the Miocene camel Aepycamelus, or the long-necked camel. Heinrich Harder (1920).
  †Aepycamelus – tentative report
- Aetobatus
- †Aglaocetus
- Alca
  - †Alca torda – or unidentified comparable form
- †Ambystoma
  - †Ambystoma maculatum
  - †Ambystoma tigrinum
- Amia
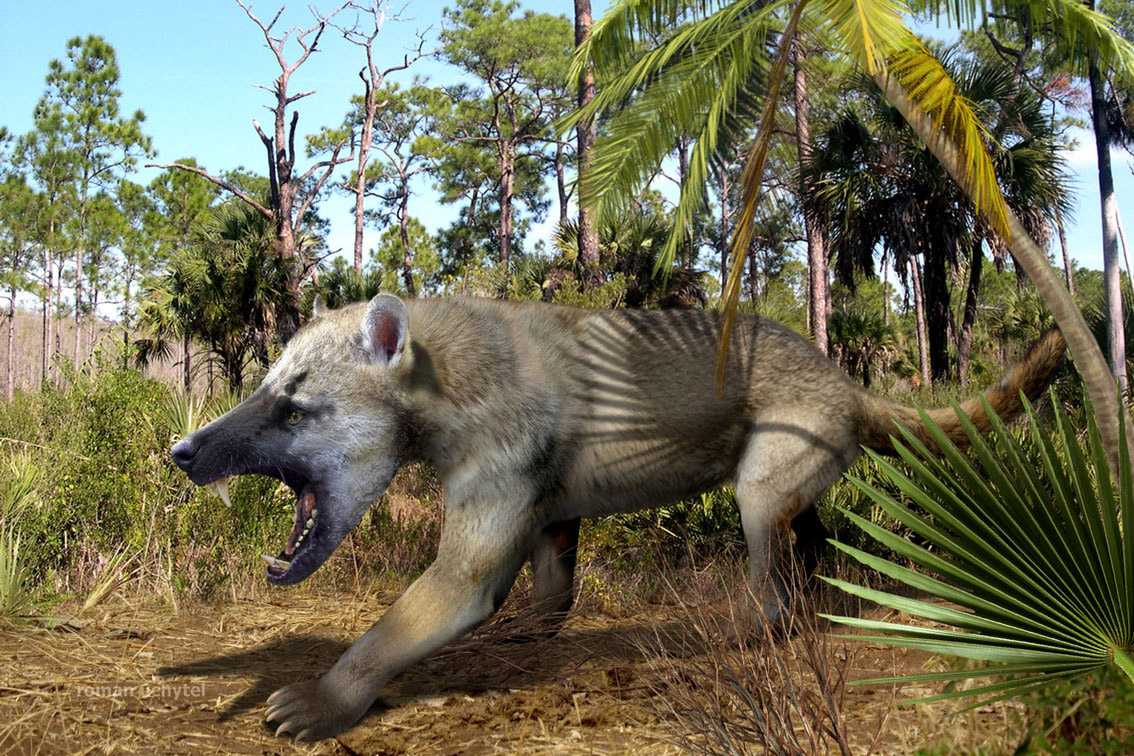
- Life restoration of the Miocene-Pliocene beardog Amphicyon
  †Amphicyon
- Amyda
- Anachis
- Anadara
  - †Anadara ovalis
  - †Anadara transversa
- Anas
  - †Anas crecca
- Ancilla – report made of unidentified related form or using admittedly obsolete nomenclature
- Angulus
- Anomia
  - †Anomia simplex
- Anticlimax – tentative report
- †Aphelops – tentative report
- Aporrhais
- Aquila
  - †Aquila chrysaetos
- †Araeodelphis – type locality for genus
- Arca
- †Archaeohippus
- Architectonica
- †Arctodus
  - †Arctodus pristinus
- Argopecten
  - †Argopecten irradians
- †Armatobalanus
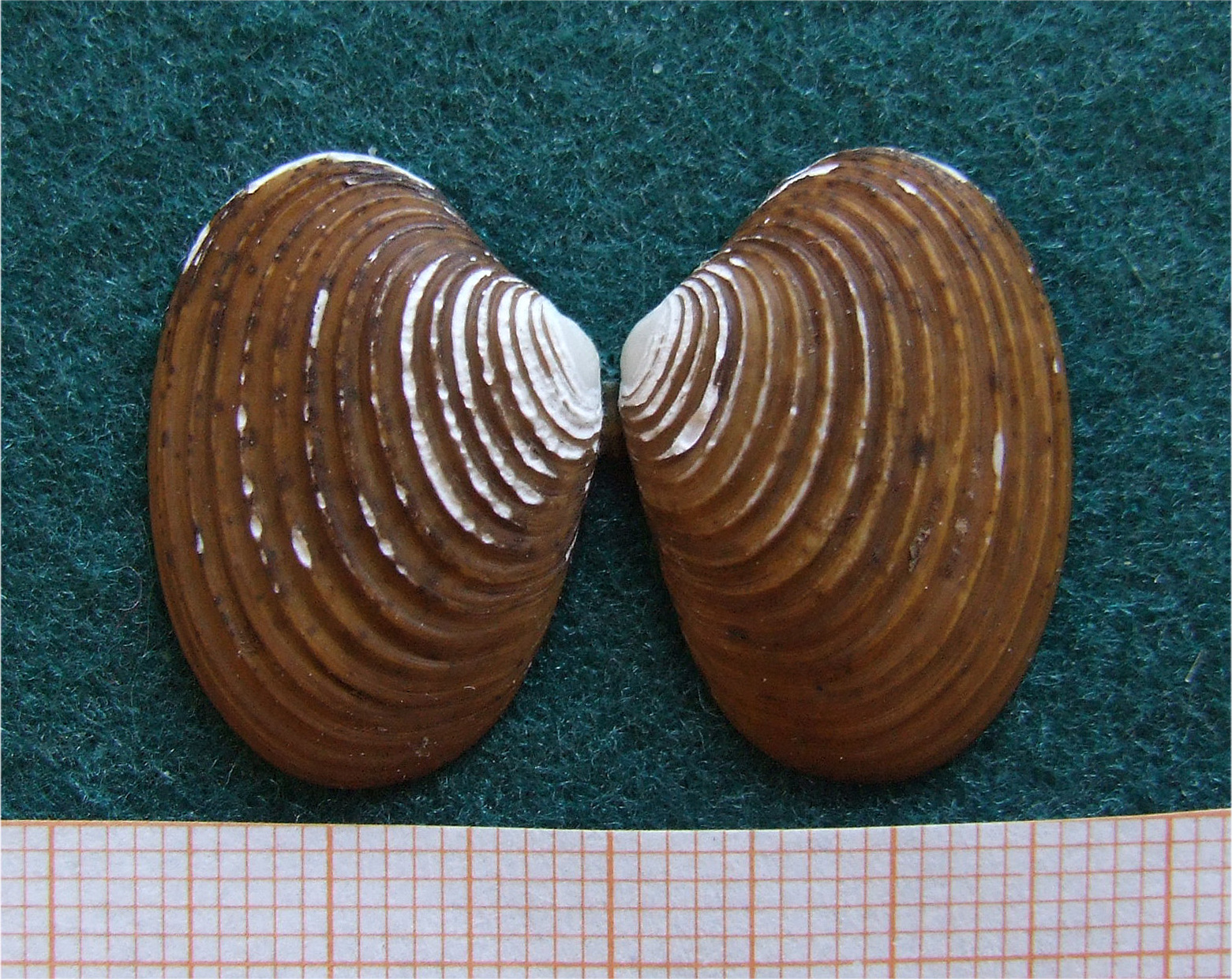
- Shell of a modern Astarte bivalve
  Astarte
  - †Astarte undata
- Asterias
  - †Asterias forbesi – or unidentified comparable form
- Astrangia
  - †Astrangia danae
- †Astroscopus – type locality for species
  - †Astroscopus countermani – type locality for species
- Astyris
  - †Astyris lunata
- Athleta
- Atrina
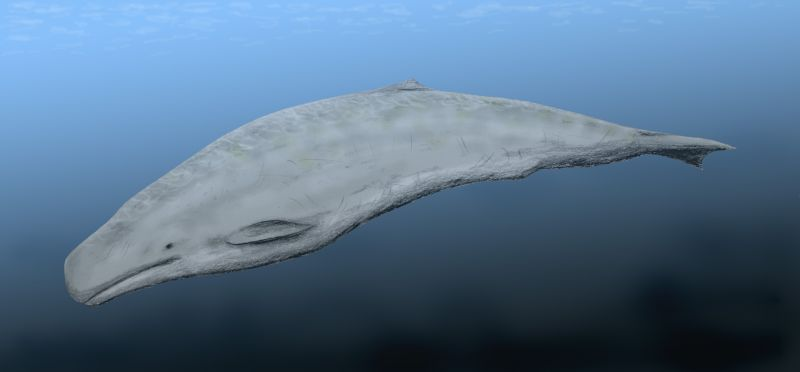
- Life restoration of the Miocene sperm whale Aulophyseter
  †Aulophyseter
- Balaenoptera
- Balanus
  - †Balanus crenatus
- Bankia
- Barnea
- Blarina
  - †Blarina brevicauda
  - †Blarina carolinensis
- Bonasa
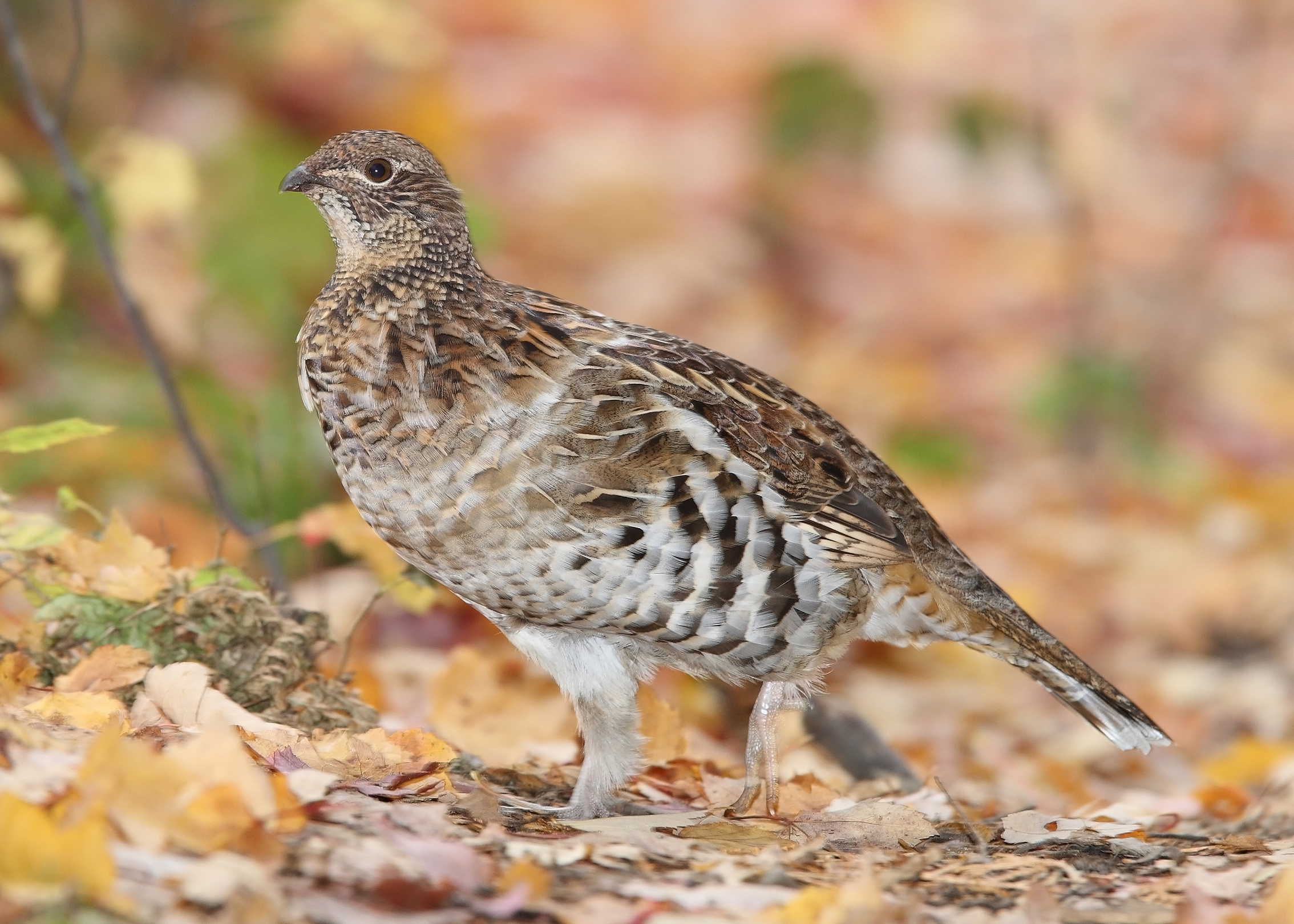
  - A living Bonasa umbellus, or ruffed grouse
    †Bonasa umbellus
- Boreotrophon
- Brachidontes
- †Brachyprotoma
  - †Brachyprotoma obtusata
- †Brevoortia
  - †Brevoortia tyrannus – or unidentified comparable form
- Bufo
  - †Bufo americanus
  - †Bufo woodhousei
- Busycon – type locality for genus
  - †Busycon carica
- Busycotypus
  - †Busycotypus canaliculatus
- Cadulus
- Caecum
- Callinectes
  - †Callinectes ornatus
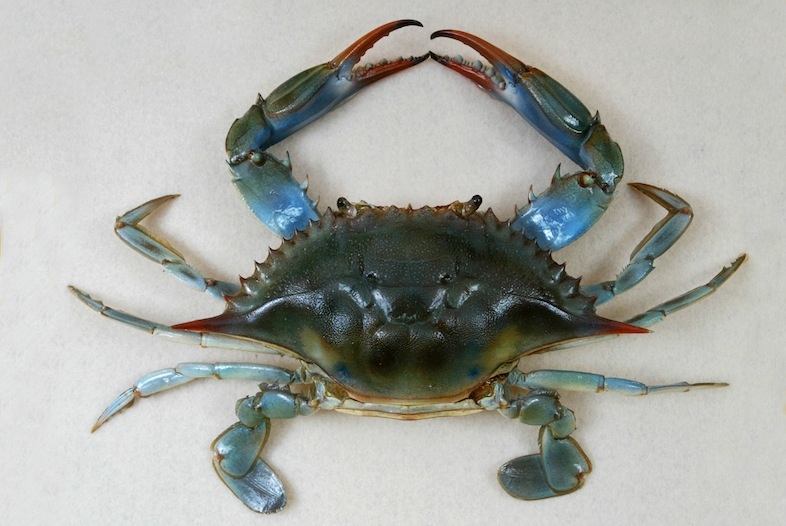
  - A living Callinectes sapidus, or Chesapeake blue crab
    †Callinectes sapidus
- Calliostoma
- Callista
- Calonectris
- Calyptraea
  - †Calyptraea centralis
- Cancellaria
- Cancer
  - †Cancer irroratus
- Canis
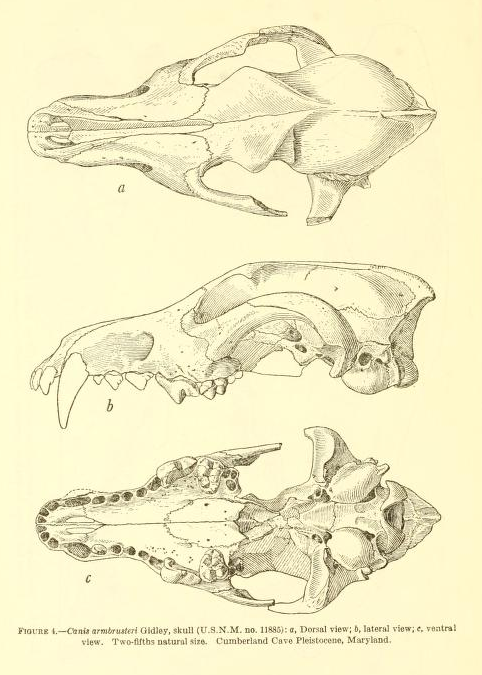
  - Illustration in multiple views of a fossilized skull of the Pleistocene Canis armbrusteri, or Armbruster's wolf
    †Canis armbrusteri – type locality for species
  - †Canis latrans
  - †Canis rufus – or unidentified comparable form
- Cantharus
- Carcharhinus
- Carcharias
- Carcharodon
  - †Carcharodon hastalis
- Cardita
- Carphophis
  - †Carphophis amoenus
- Cassis
- Castor
  - †Castor canadensis
- †Cephalotropis – type locality for genus
- Cerastoderma
- Cervus
- Cetorhinus
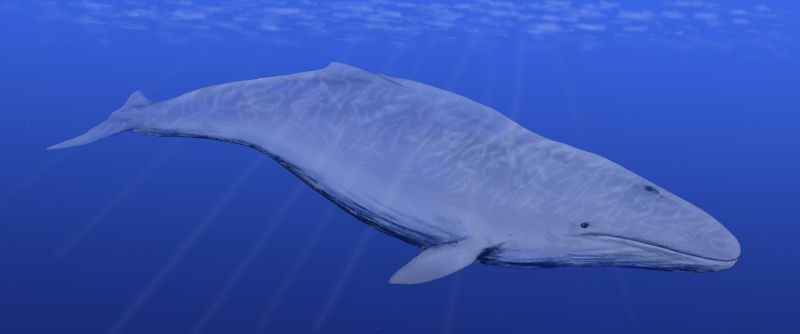
- Life restoration of the Miocene-Pliocene whale Cetotherium
  †Cetotherium
- Chama
- Chelone
- Chelydra
  - †Chelydra serpentina
- †Chesapecten
  - †Chesapecten jeffersonius
- Chlamys
- Chrysemys
  - †Chrysemys picta
- Circulus – report made of unidentified related form or using admittedly obsolete nomenclature
- Cirsotrema
- Clavus
- Clementia
- Clethrionomys
  - Clethrionomys gapperi – or unidentified comparable form
- Cliona
- Coluber
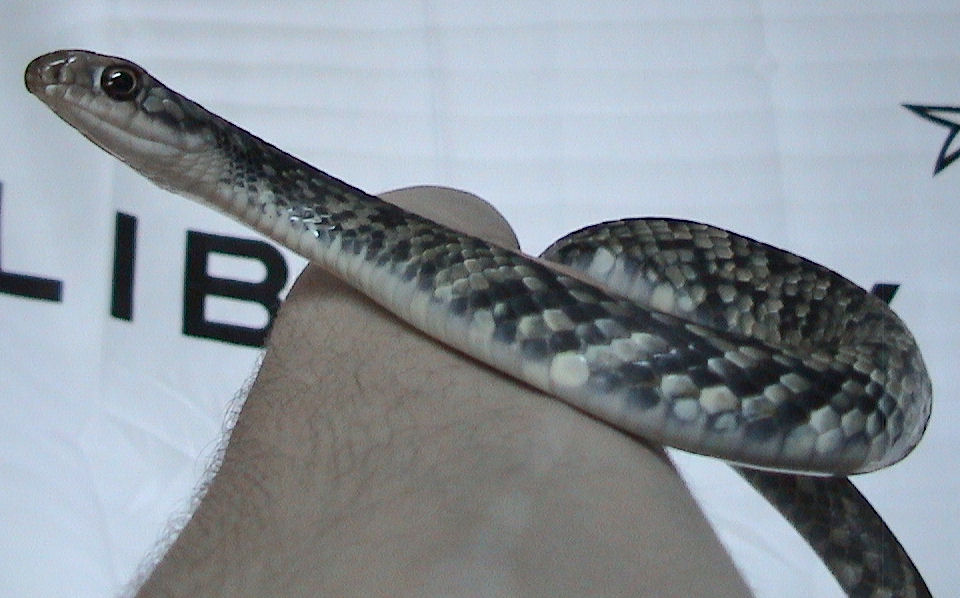
  - A living Coluber constrictor, or eastern racer
    †Coluber constrictor
- Concavus
- Condylura
  - †Condylura cristata
- Conus
- Corbula
- Crassostrea
  - †Crassostrea virginica
- Crepidula
  - †Crepidula fornicata
  - †Crepidula plana
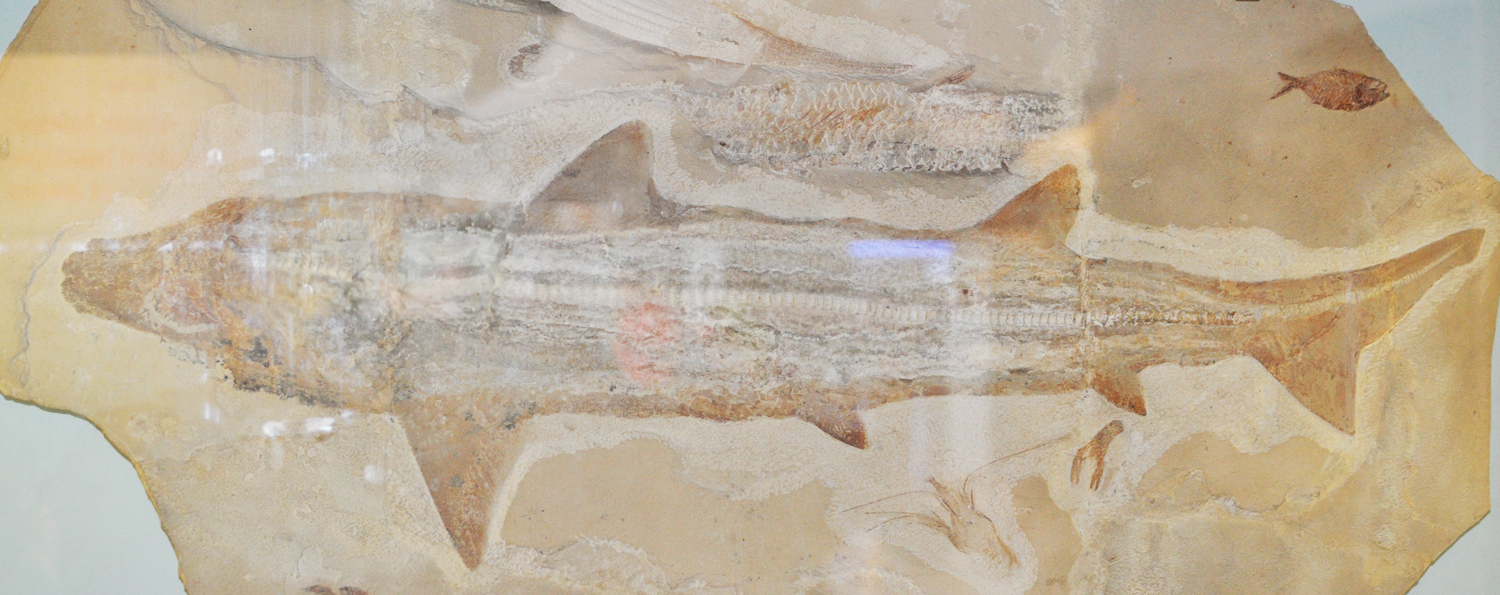
- Fossil of the Early Cretaceous-Eocene shark Cretolamna
  †Cretolamna
  - †Cretolamna appendiculata
- Crotalus
  - †Crotalus horridus
- Crucibulum
- Cryptobranchus
- Cucullaea
- Cumingia
- Cyclocardia
- Cylichna
- Cymatosyrinx
- †Cynarctus
  - †Cynarctus wangi – type locality for species
- Multiple views of a shell of a Cypraea cowrie sea snail
  Cypraea
  - †Cyrtopleura costata
- Cythara
- †Cytheris
- Dasyatis
- Dentalium
- Diadophis
  - †Diadophis punctatus
- Diodora
- †Diorocetus – type locality for genus
- †Dipoides
- Discinisca
- †Dolicholatirus
- Dosinia
- Echinocardium
- Echinophoria – type locality for genus
- †Ecphora
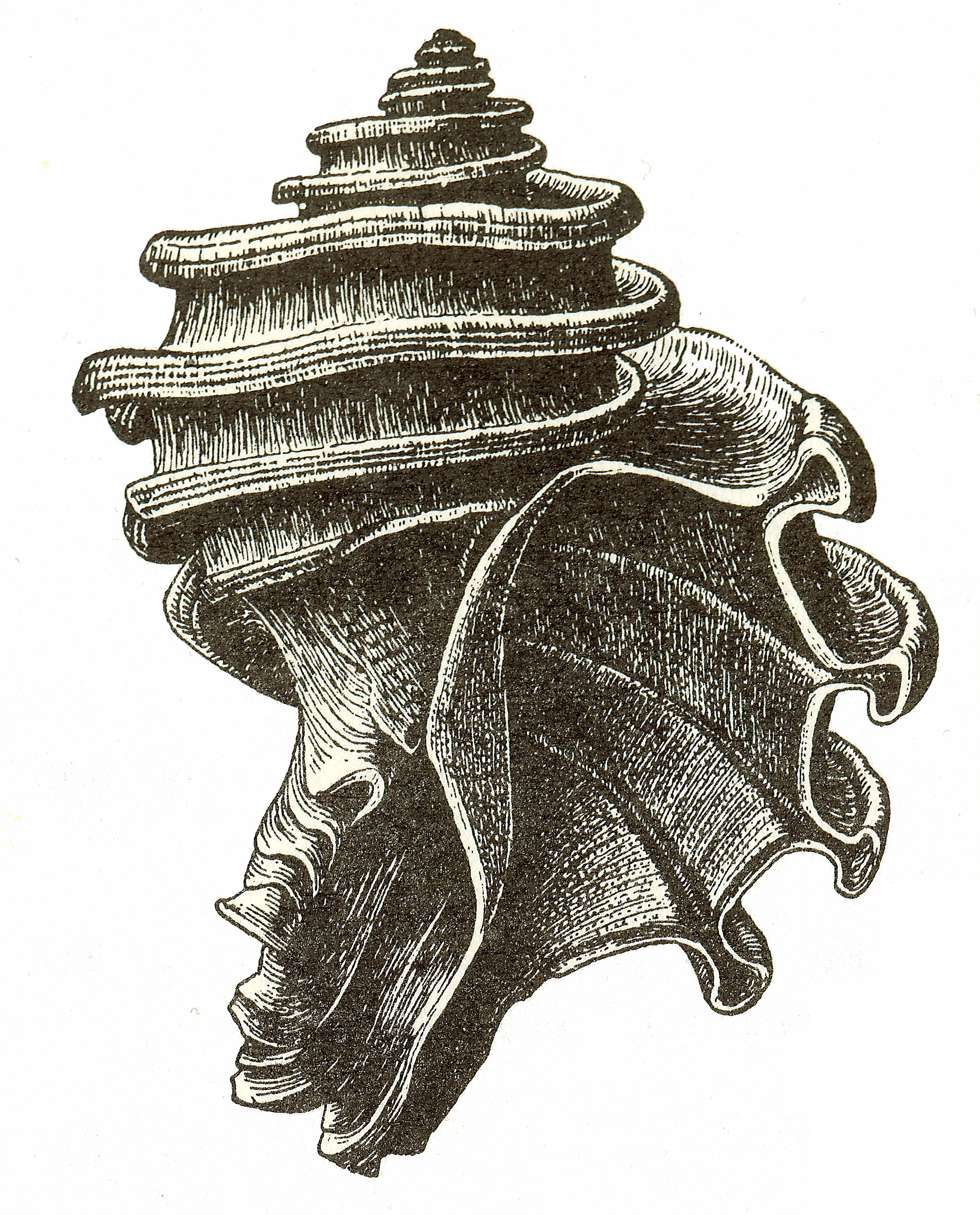
  - Illustration of a fossilized shell of the Miocene murex sea snail Ecphora gardnerae
    †Ecphora gardnerae
- †Ectopistes
  - †Ectopistes migratorius
- Elaphe
  - †Elaphe vulpina
- Electra
- Elphidium
- Ensis
  - †Ensis directus
- †Entobia
- †Eosuchus
- †Eosurcula – or unidentified comparable form
- Epitonium
  - †Epitonium humphreysii
- Eptesicus
  - †Eptesicus fuscus – or unidentified comparable form
- Equus
  - †Equus giganteus
- Erethizon
  - †Erethizon dorsatum
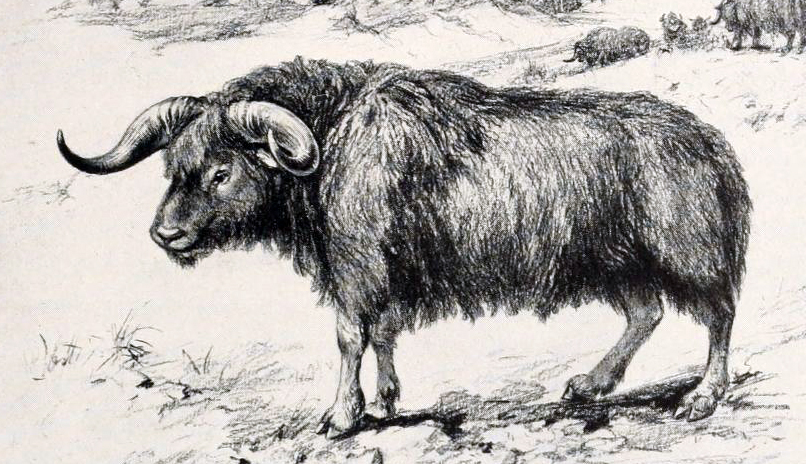
- Life restoration of the Pleistocene bovid Euceratherium, or the shrub ox. Robert Bruce Horsfall (1913).
  †Euceratherium
  - †Euceratherium collinum
- †Euclastes – tentative report
- Eulima
- Eumeces
  - †Eumeces fasciatus – or unidentified comparable form
- Eupleura
  - †Eupleura caudata
- †Eurhinodelphis
  - †Eurhinodelphis longirostris
- Euspira
  - †Euspira heros
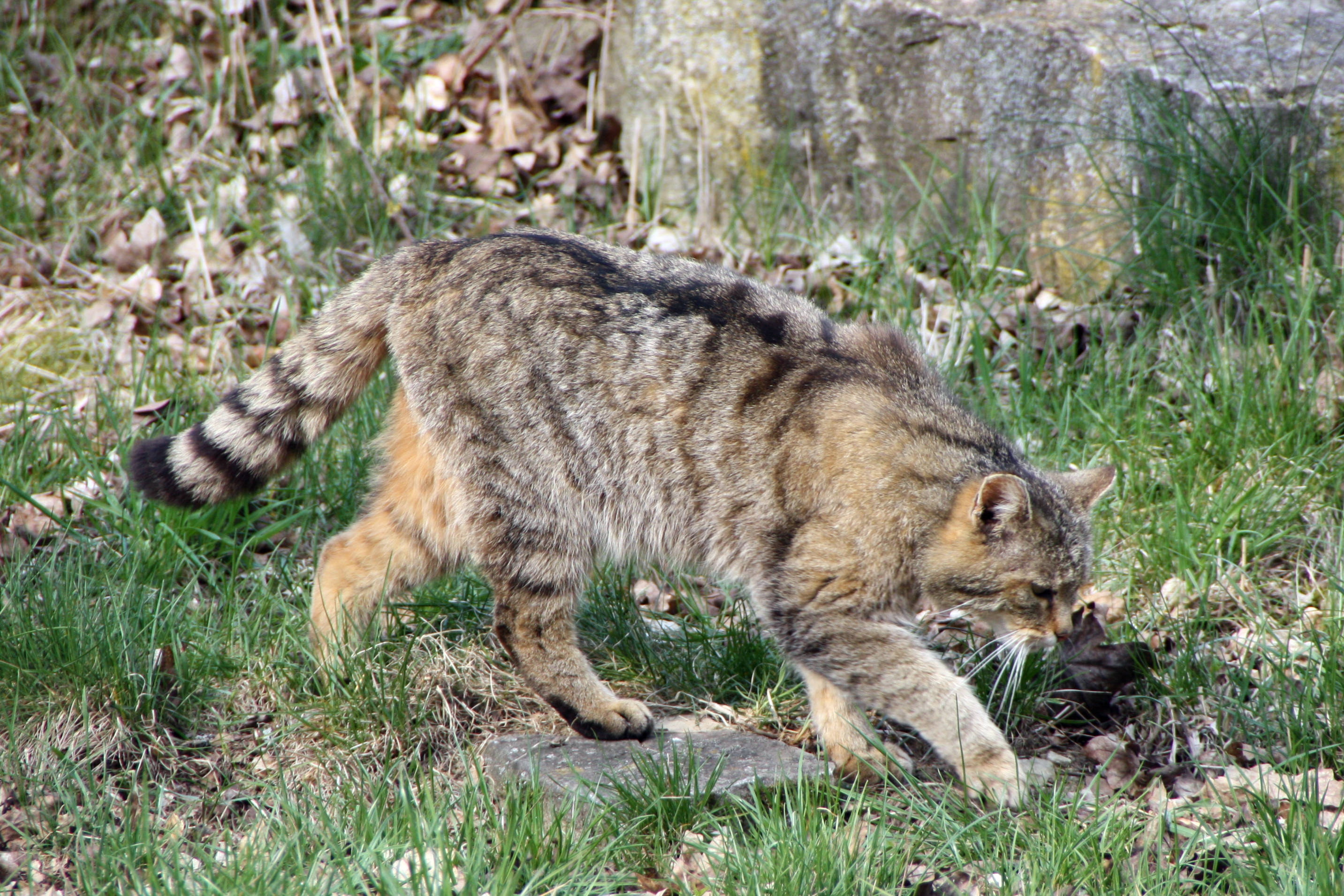
- A living Felis, or cat
  Felis
- †Ficopsis
- Fissurella
- †Fistulobalanus
- †Fulgar
- Galeocerdo
  - †Galeocerdo aduncus
  - †Galeocerdo contortus
- Galeodea
- Gari
- Gastrochaena
- Gavia
  - †Gavia immer
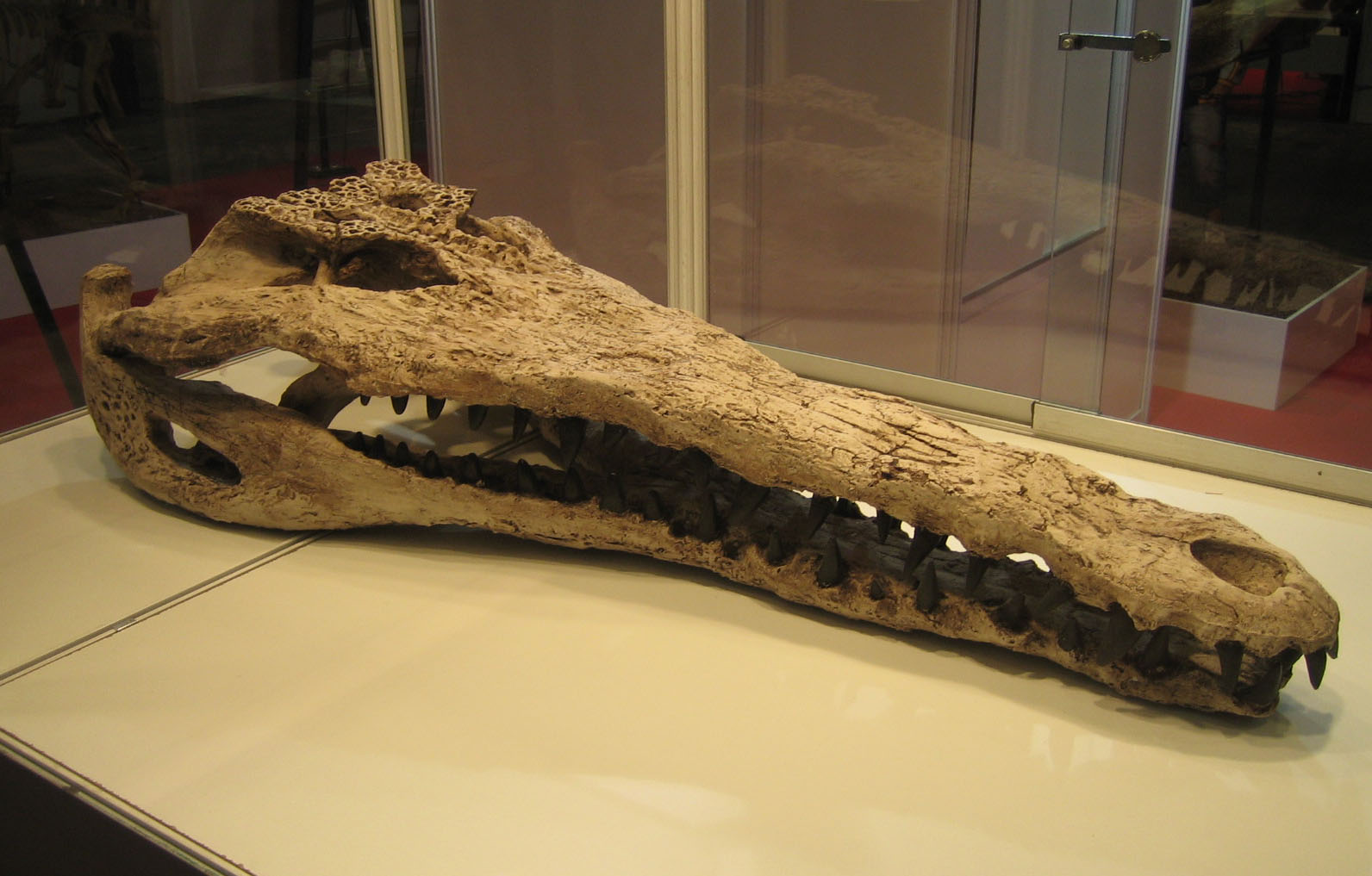
- Fossilized skull of the Miocene crocodile relative Gavialosuchus
  †Gavialosuchus
- Gegania
- Gemma
  - †Gemma gemma
- Genota – or unidentified comparable form
- Geukensia
  - †Geukensia demissa
- Gibbula – tentative report
- Glaucomys
- Globigerina
- Globigerinoides
- Glossus
- Glycimeris
- Glycymeris
  - †Glycymeris americana
- Glyptemys
  - †Glyptemys muhlenbergii
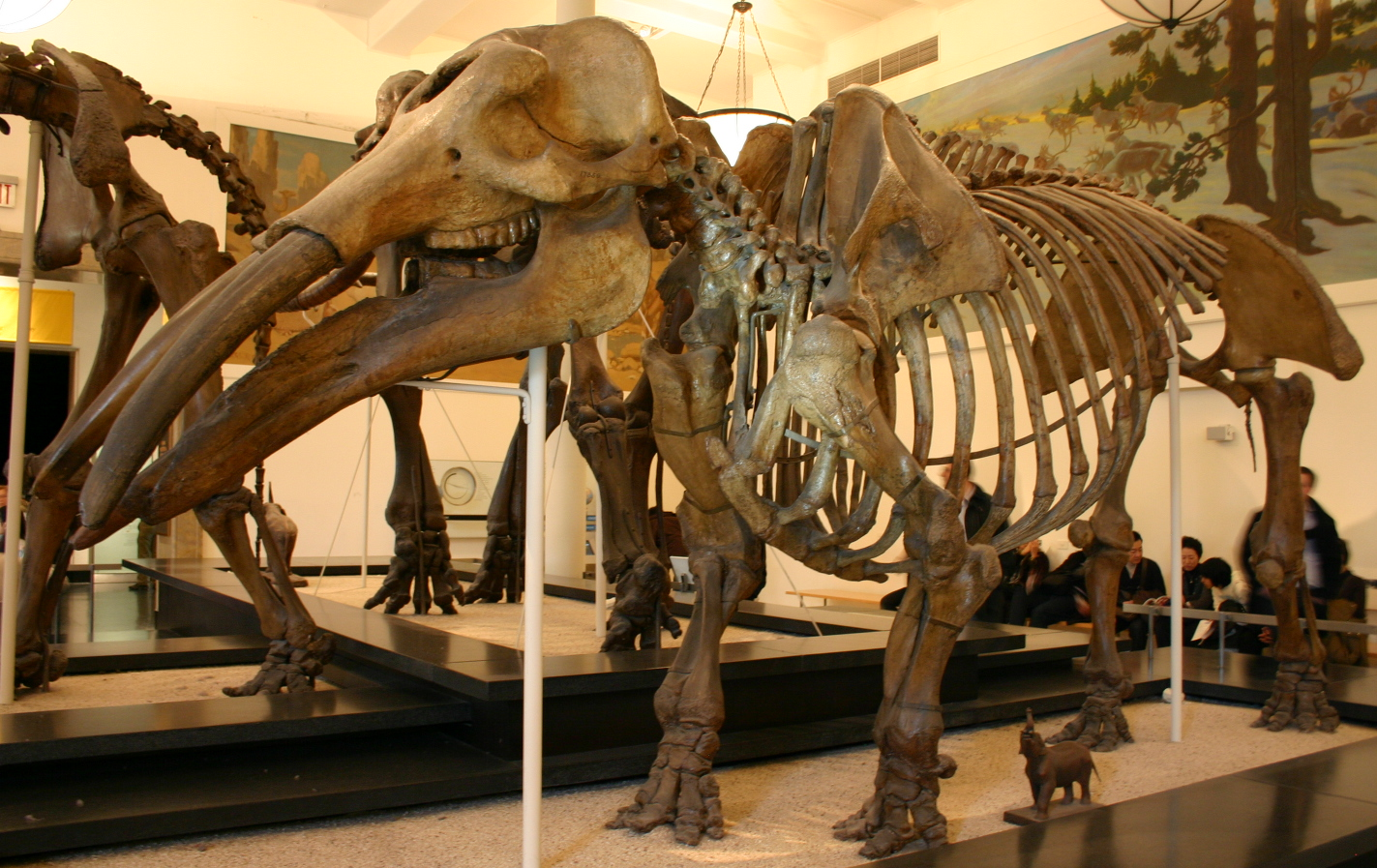
- Mounted fossilized skeleton of the Miocene-Pleistocene elephant relative Gomphotherium
  †Gomphotherium
- Gulo
  - †Gulo gulo
- Gyrinophilus
  - †Gyrinophilus porphyriticus – or unidentified comparable form
- †Hadrodelphis – type locality for genus
- Haminoea
- Hastula
- Haustator
- †Heliadornis – type locality for genus
- Hemipristis
  - †Hemipristis serra
- Heterodon
  - †Heterodon platyrhinos – or unidentified comparable form
- Hiatella
  - †Hiatella arctica
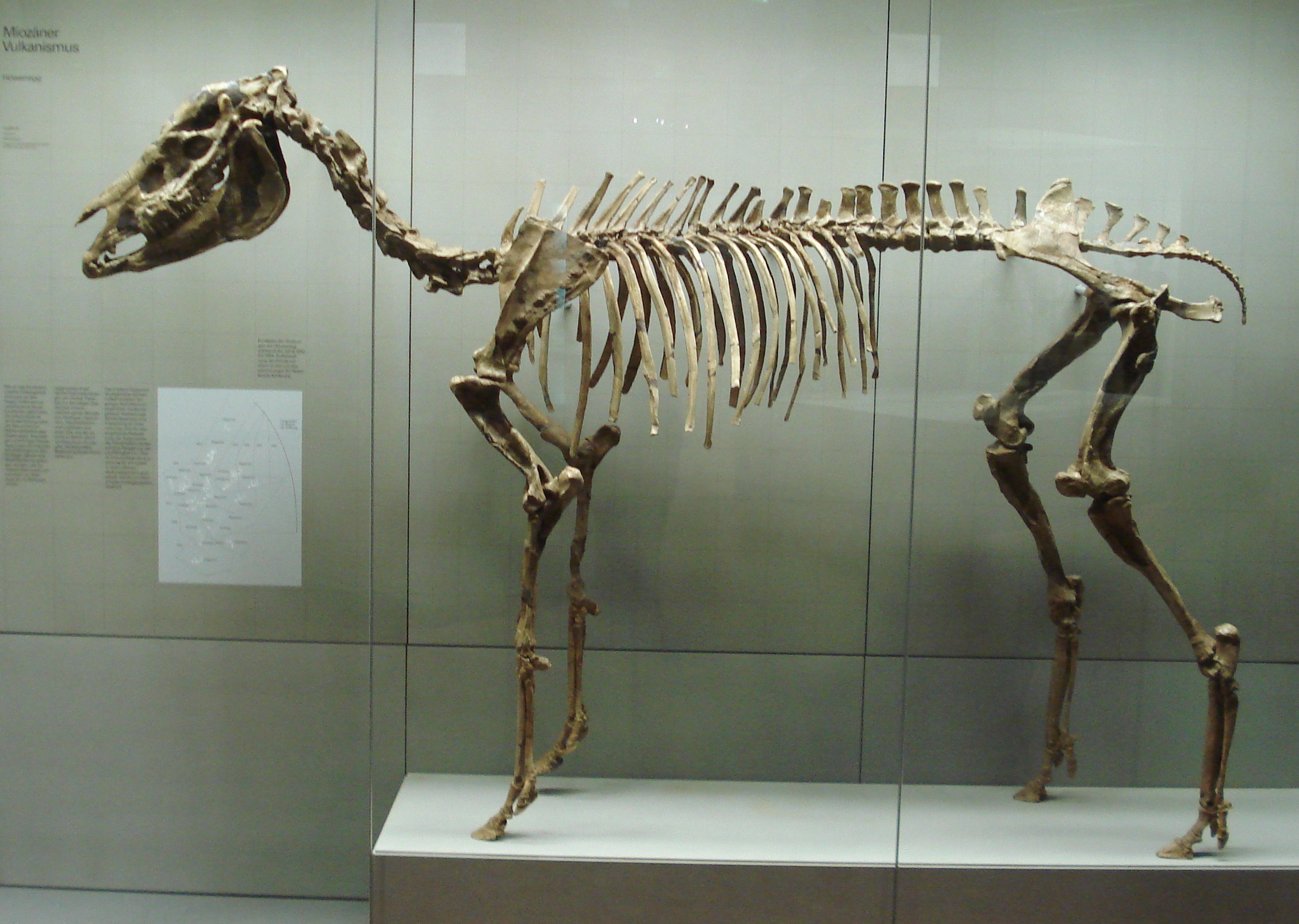
- Mounted fossilized skeleton of the Miocene-Pliocene horse Hippotherium
  †Hippotherium
- Hyla
  - †Hyla crucifer
- Hyotissa
- Ictalurus
- Ilyanassa
  - †Ilyanassa obsoleta
  - †Ilyanassa trivittata
- Ischadium
  - †Ischadium recurvum
- †Ischyodus
- Isognomon
- Isurus
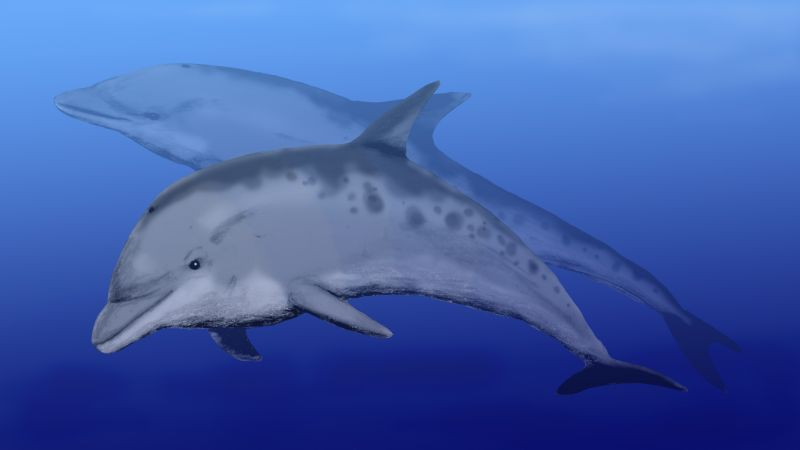
- Life restoration of the Oligocene-Miocene dolphin Kentriodon
  †Kentriodon – type locality for genus
- Kuphus – report made of unidentified related form or using admittedly obsolete nomenclature
- Kurtziella
  - †Kurtziella cerina
- Lacuna
- †Lagodon
- Lamna
- Lampropeltis
  - †Lampropeltis triangulum
- Lasiopodomys
- Lepisosteus
- †Leptophoca – type locality for genus
  - †Leptophoca lenis – type locality for species
- Lepus
  - †Lepus americanus
- Libinia
  - †Libinia dubia
- Lithophaga – or unidentified comparable form
- Littoraria
  - †Littoraria irrorata
- Lontra
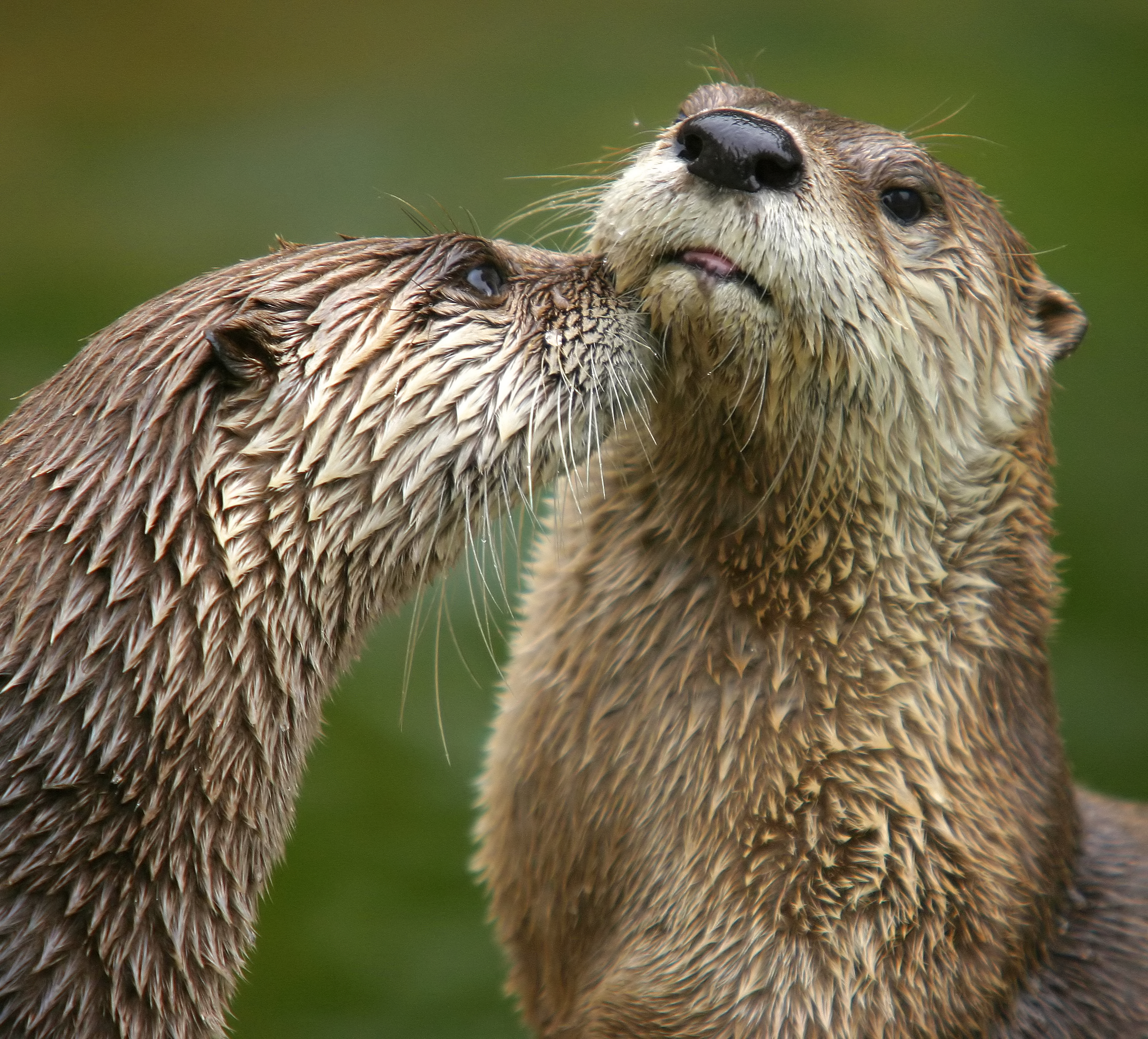
  - Pair of living Lontra canadensis, or North American river otter
    †Lontra canadensis
- †Lophocetus
- Lopholatilus
- Lucina
- Lunatia
- Lyonsia
- Macoma
  - †Macoma balthica
- Macrocallista
- †Macrokentriodon – type locality for genus
- †Mammut
  - †Mammut americanum
- †Mammuthus
  - †Mammuthus columbi
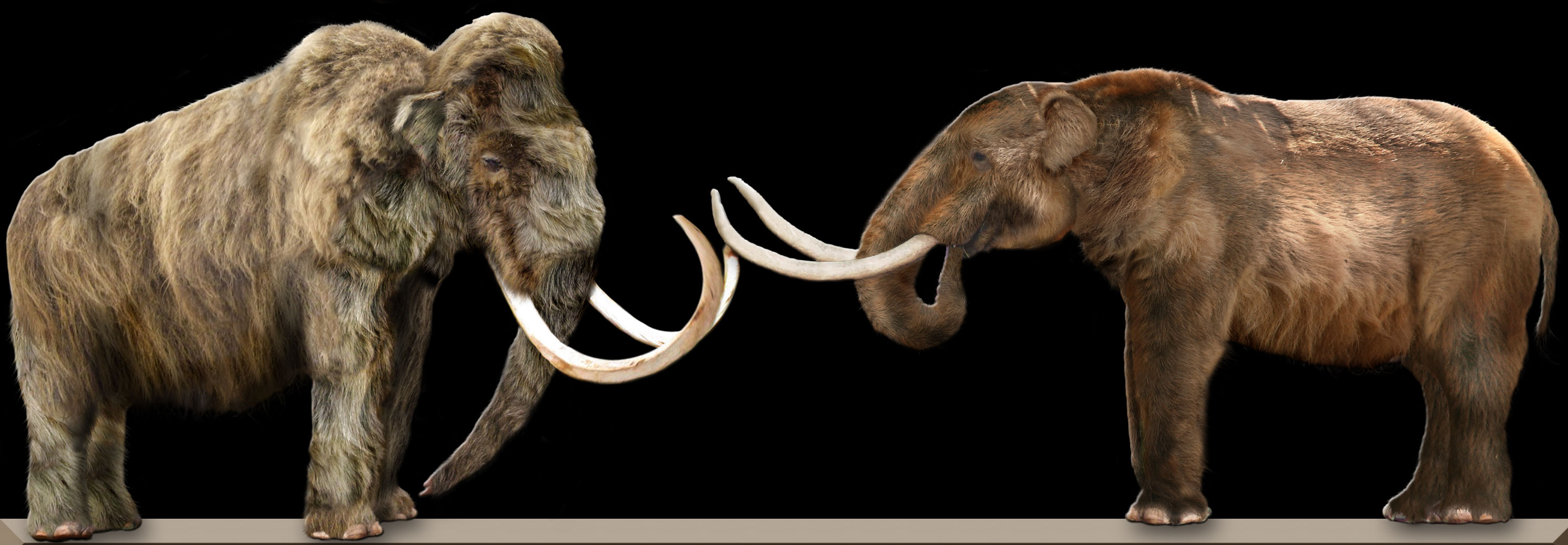
  - Life restorations of a Mammut americanum, or American mastodon (right), and a Mammuthus primigenius, or wooly mammoth (left)
    †Mammuthus primigenius
- Marginella
- Marmota
  - †Marmota monax
- Martesia
- Mathilda
- †Megalonyx
- Megaptera
- Melampus
  - †Melampus bidentatus
- Melanitta
  - †Melanitta deglandi
- Meleagris
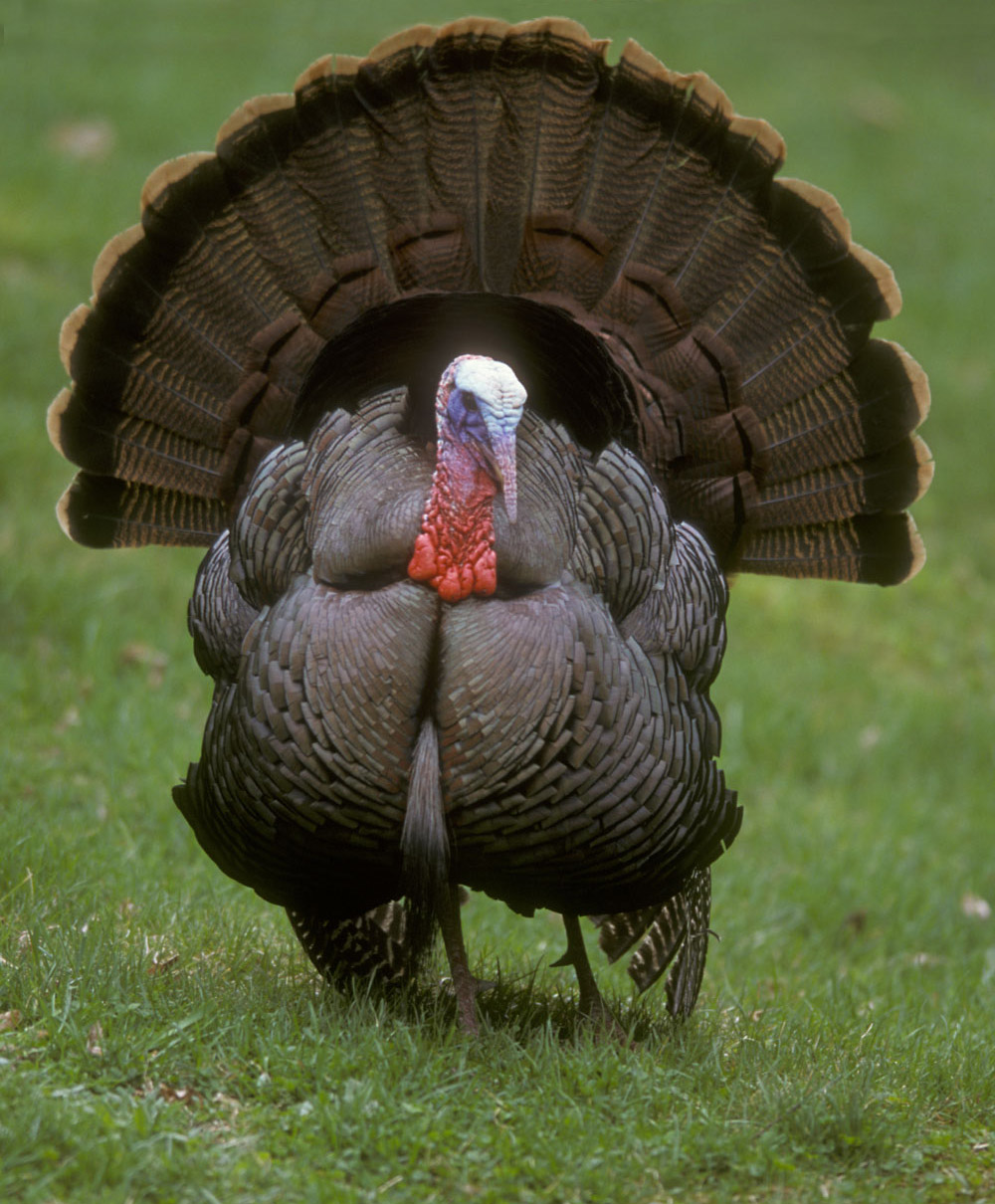
  - A wild male Meleagris gallopavo, or turkey, displaying his facial coloration and tail feathers to attract a female
    †Meleagris gallopavo
- Membranipora
- Menestho
- Mephitis
  - †Mephitis mephitis
- Mercenaria
  - †Mercenaria mercenaria
- Meretrix
- †Merychippus
- †Mesocetus
- †Metaxytherium
- Microtus
  - †Microtus chrotorrhinus – or unidentified comparable form
  - †Microtus pennsylvanicus
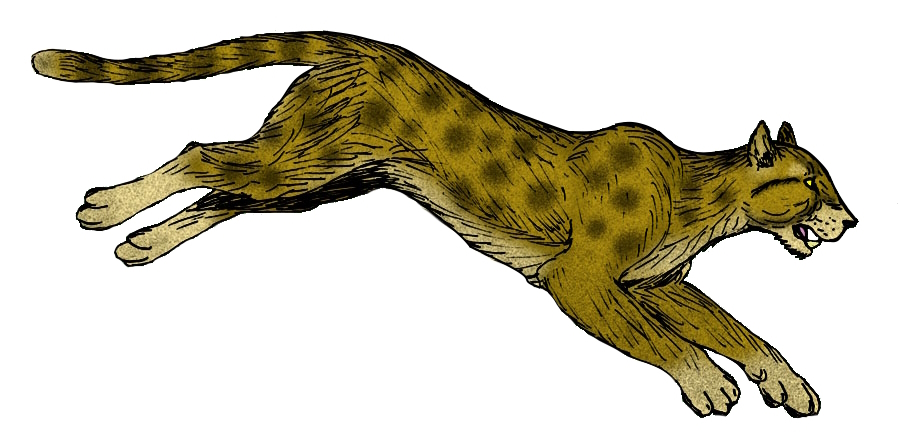
- Restoration of the Pliocene-Pleistocene Miracinonyx, or American cheetah
  †Miracinonyx
  - †Miracinonyx inexpectatus
- Mitra
- Modiolus
  - †Modiolus modiolus
- †Moira – tentative report
- †Monotherium
- Mulinia
  - †Mulinia lateralis
- Mustela
  - †Mustela vison – or unidentified comparable form
- †Mya
  - †Mya arenaria
- Myliobatis
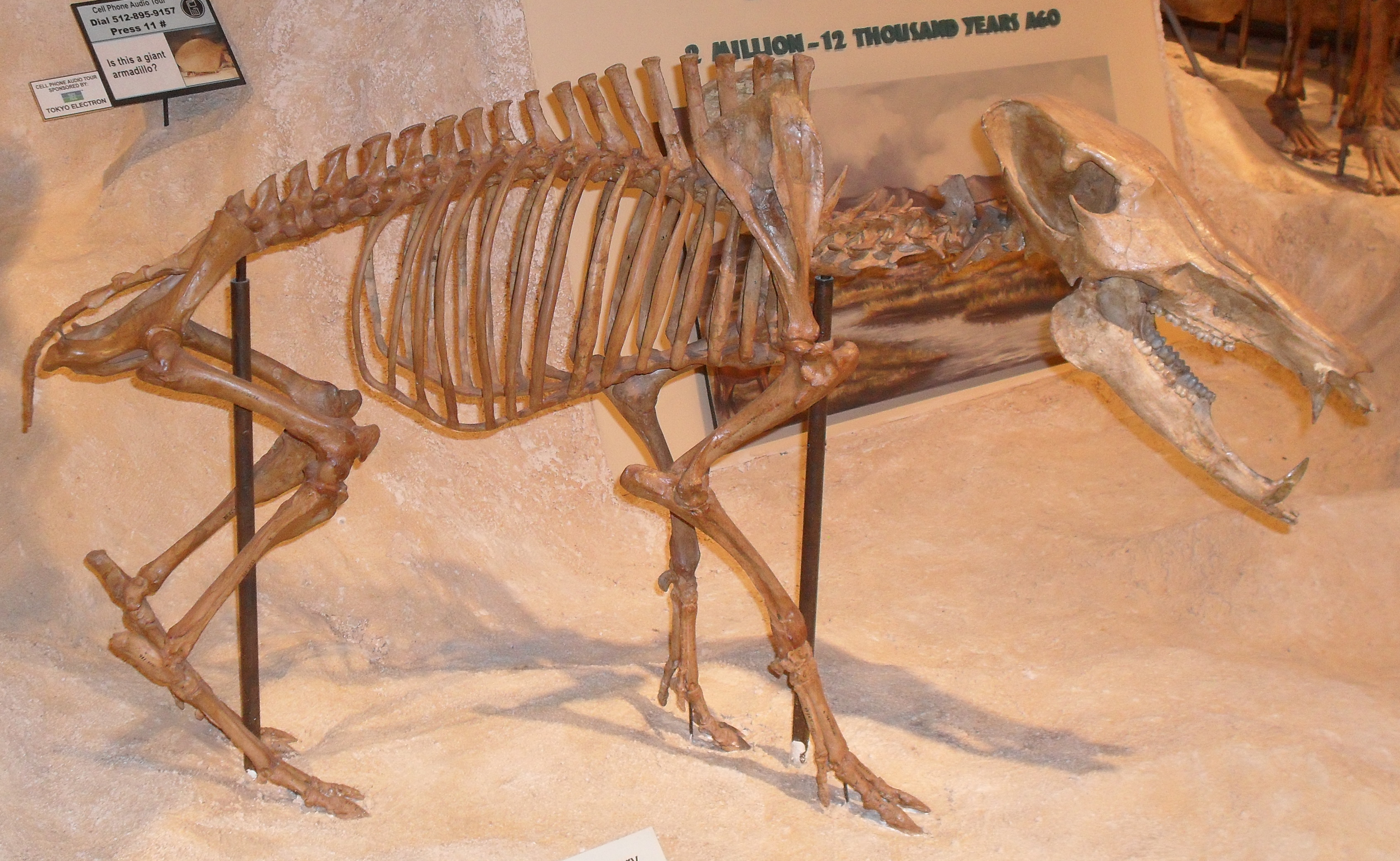
- Fossilized skeleton of the Pliocene-Holocene peccary Mylohyus
  †Mylohyus
  - †Mylohyus fossilis – type locality for species
- Myotis
  - †Myotis grisescens – or unidentified comparable form
- Mytilus
- †Nanosiren – tentative report
- Napaeozapus
  - †Napaeozapus insignis
- Narona
- Nassa
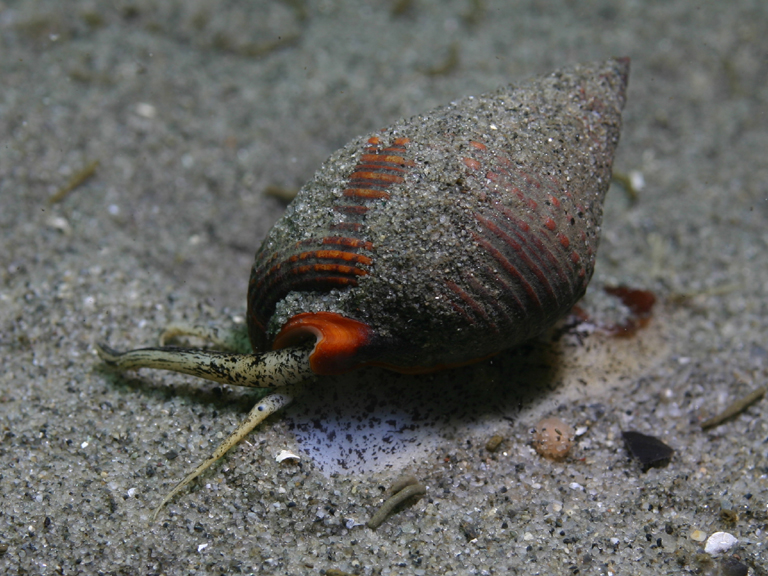
- A living Nassarius, or nassa mud snail
  Nassarius
  - †Nassarius vibex
- Neofiber
- Neotoma – type locality for genus
  - †Neotoma floridana
- Nerodia
  - †Nerodia sipedon
- Neverita
- Notophthalmus
  - †Notophthalmus viridescens – or unidentified comparable form
- Notorynchus
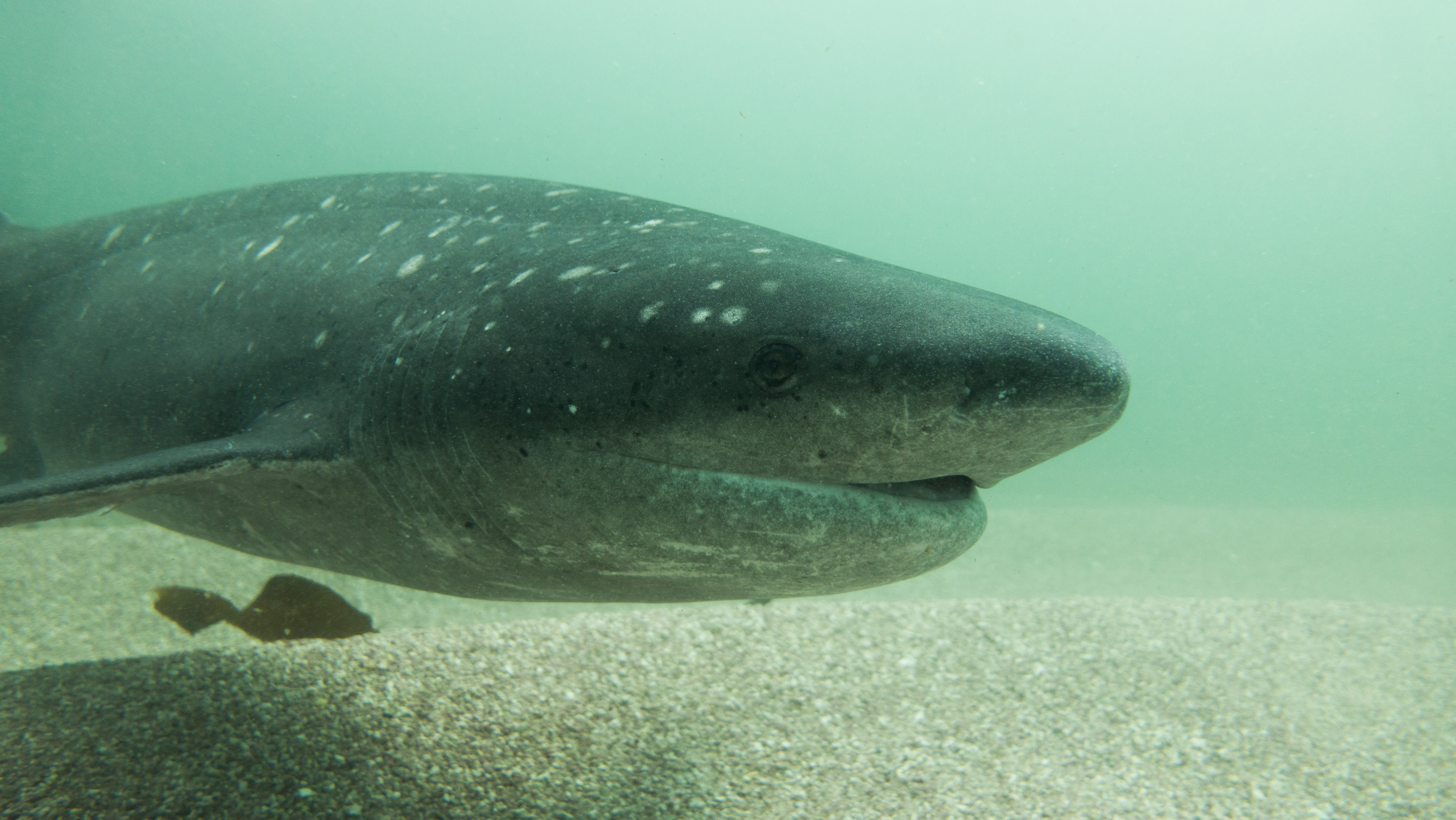
  - Close-up portrait of a living Notorynchus cepedianus, or broadnose sevengill shark
    †Notorynchus cepedianus – type locality for species
- Novocrania
- Nucula
  - †Nucula proxima
  - †Nuculana acuta
- Ochotona
  - †Ochotona princeps – or unidentified comparable form
- Odocoileus
  - †Odocoileus virginianus
- Odontaspis
- Odostomia
- Ondatra
  - †Ondatra zibethicus
- Opheodrys
  - †Opheodrys vernalis
- †Orycterocetus
- †Osteopygis
- Ostrea
- †Otodus
  - Diagram illustrating the largest (grey) and most conservative (red) size estimates of the Miocene-Pliocene shark Carcharocles megalodon (sometimes Carcharodon or Otodus megalodon) with a whale shark (violet), great white shark (green), and anachronistic human (black) to scale
    †Otodus megalodon
- Otus
- †Oxyrhina
  - †Oxyrhina desorii
- Pagurus
  - †Pagurus pollicaris
- †Palaeocarcharodon
- †Palaeophis
- Pandora
- Panopea
- Panopeus
  - †Panopeus herbstii
- Panthera
  - †Panthera atrox
  - †Panthera onca
- Parascalops
  - †Parascalops breweri
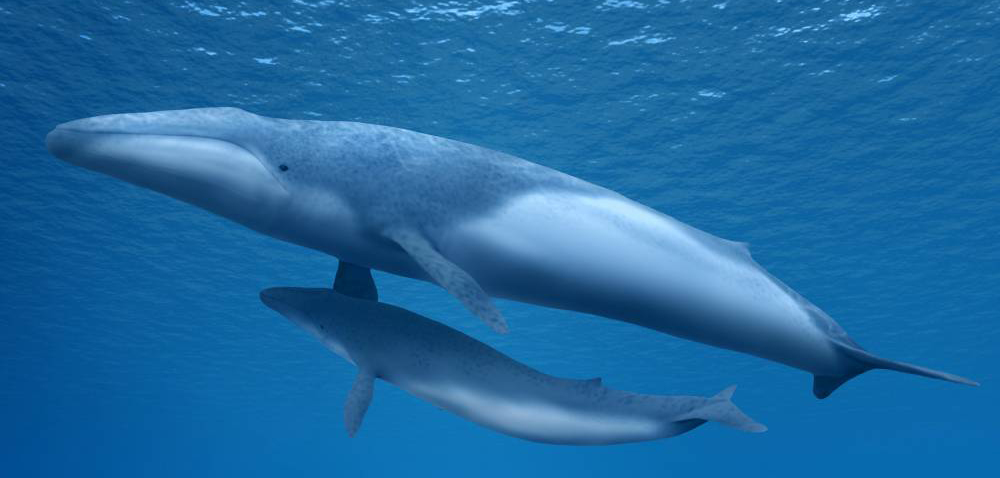
- Life restoration of the Miocene baleen whale Parietobalaena and calf
  †Parietobalaena – type locality for genus
  - †Parietobalaena palmeri – type locality for species
- Pecten
- Pekania
- †Pelocetus – type locality for genus
- Perisoreus
  - †Perisoreus canadensis
- Peromyscus
  - †Peromyscus leucopus – or unidentified comparable form
- Petricola
  - †Petricola pholadiformis
- †Phenacodus – tentative report
- Phenacomys
- †Phocageneus
- Pholadomya
- †Physeterula
- Pinna
- Pipistrellus
- Pitar
  - †Pitar morrhuanus
- Pitymys
- Placopecten
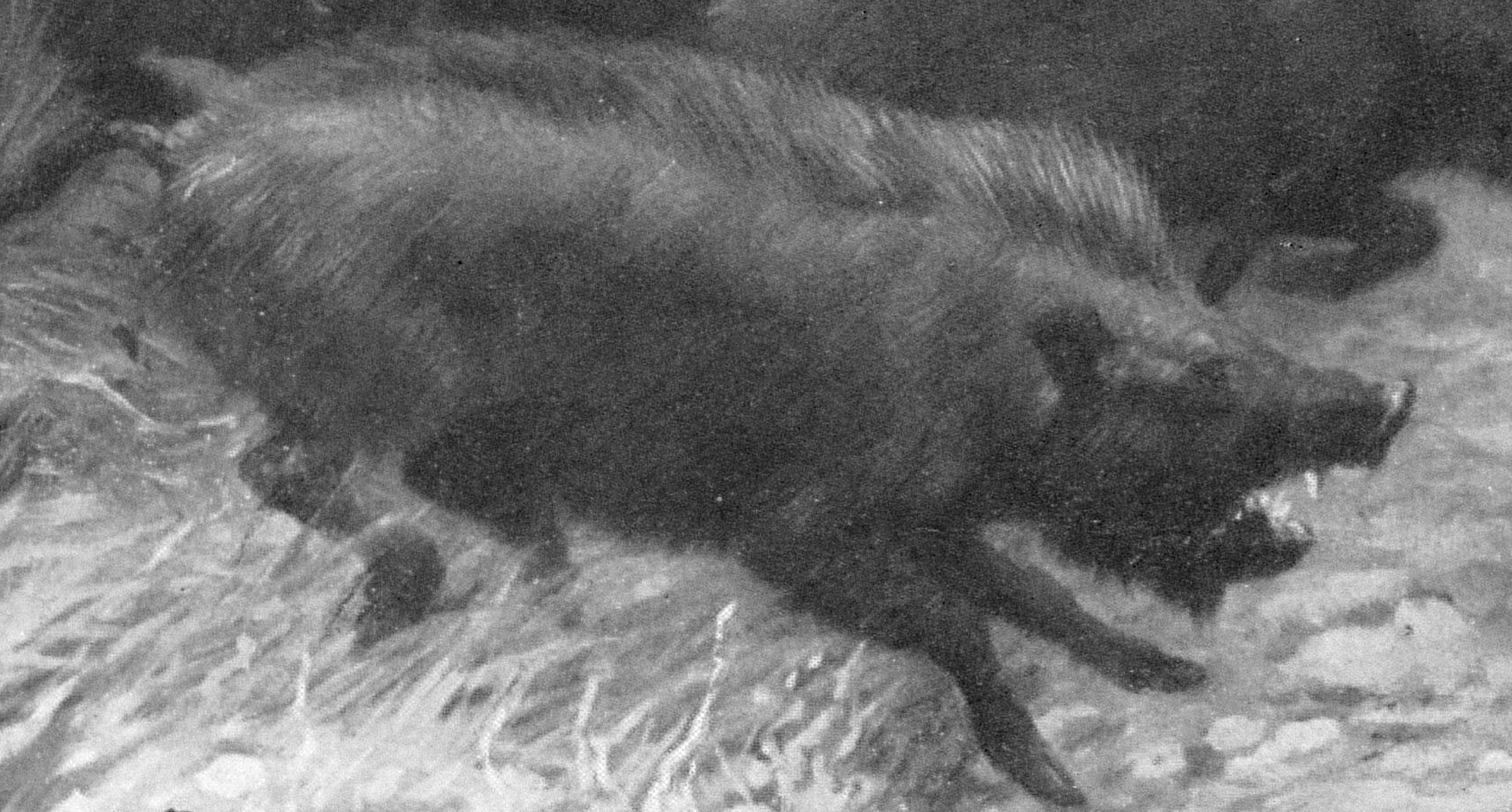
- Restoration of a herd of alarmed Miocene-Pleistocene peccaries of the genus Platygonus. Charles R. Knight (1922).
  †Platygonus
- Plecotus
- Plethodon
- Pleurotomella
- Pogonias
  - †Pogonias cromis – or unidentified comparable form
- Polydora
- Polystira
- †Presbyornis
- †Prionodon
- Prionotus
  - †Prionotus evolans – or unidentified related form
- Propebela
- Prophaethon – tentative report
- †Protocardia
- Pseudacris
  - †Pseudacris triseriata
- Pseudoliva
- Pteria
- †Ptychosalpinx
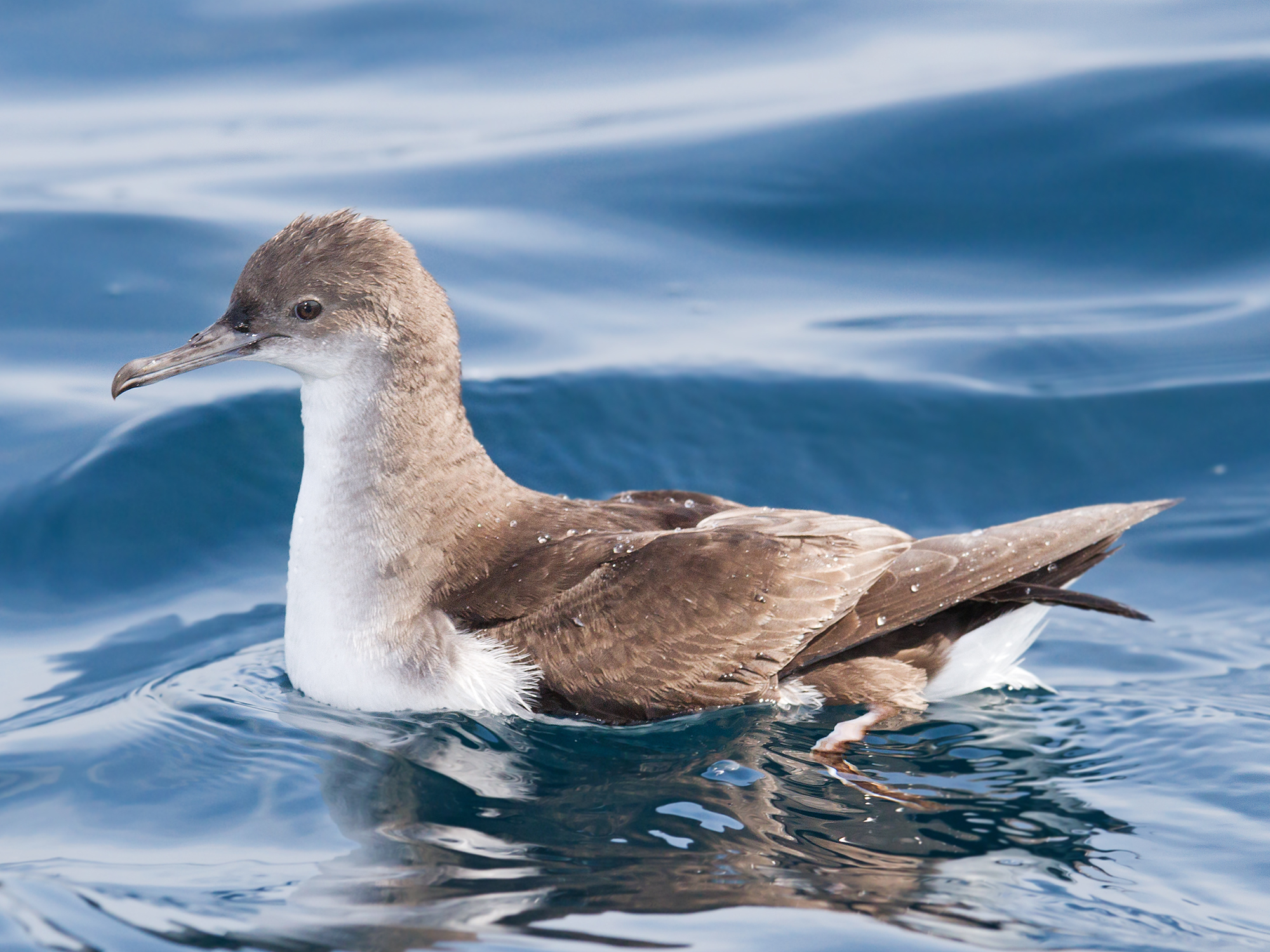
- A living Puffinus shearwater
  Puffinus
- Pycnodonte
- Quinqueloculina
- †Rana
  - †Rana clamitans
  - †Rana pipiens
  - †Rana sylvatica
- Rangia
- Ranzania
- Retusa
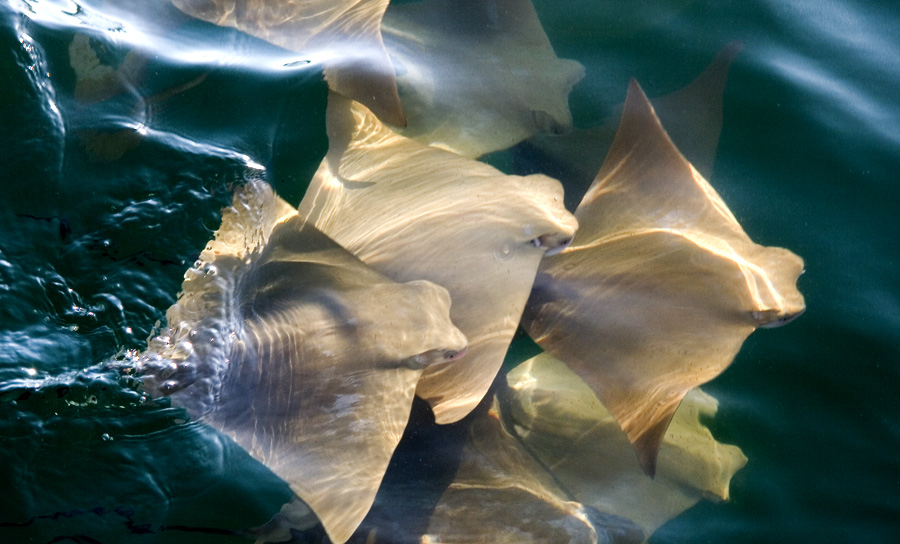
- A school of living Rhinoptera, or cownose rays
  Rhinoptera
- Rhynchobatus
- †Roccus
  - †Roccus saxatilis
- †Rotalia
- Salamandra
- †Scala – report made of unidentified related form or using admittedly obsolete nomenclature
- †Scala
- †Scaldicetus
- †Scapanorhynchus
- Scaphander
- Scaphella – type locality for genus
- Sceloporus
  - †Sceloporus undulatus – or unidentified comparable form
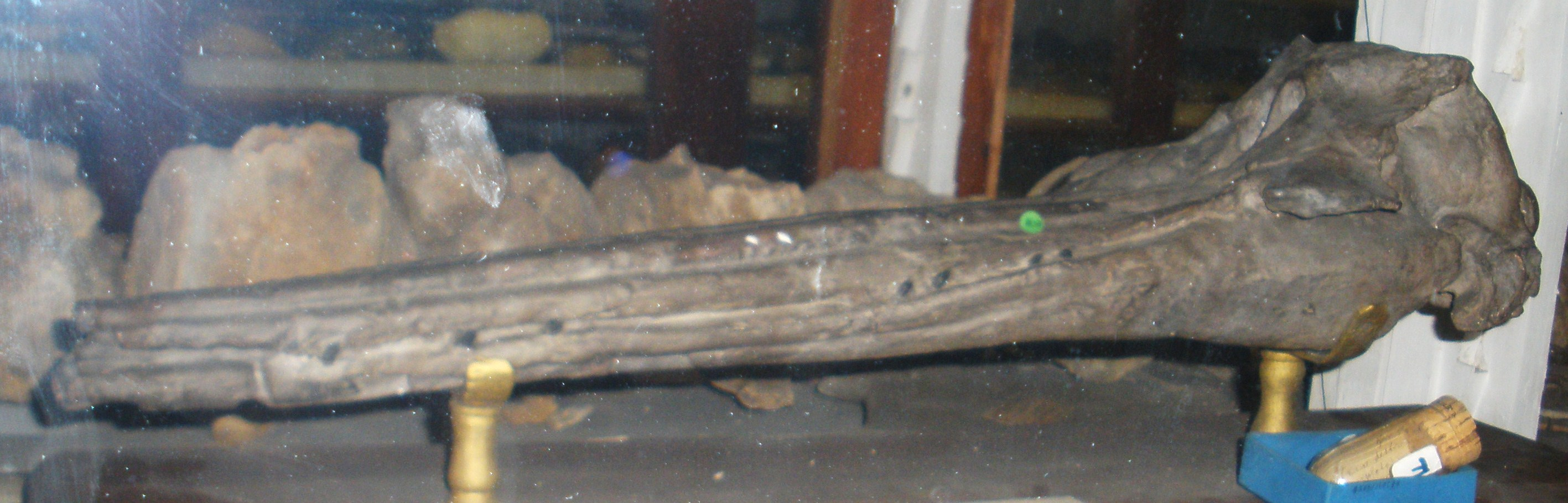
- Fossilized skull of the Miocene toothed whale Schizodelphis
  †Schizodelphis
- Schizoporella
  - †Schizoporella unicornis
- Sciaenops
- Sciurus
  - †Sciurus carolinensis
- †Scutella
- †Sediliopsis – type locality for genus
- Seila
  - †Seila adamsii
- Semele – tentative report
- Semele
- Serpulorbis
- Siphonalia
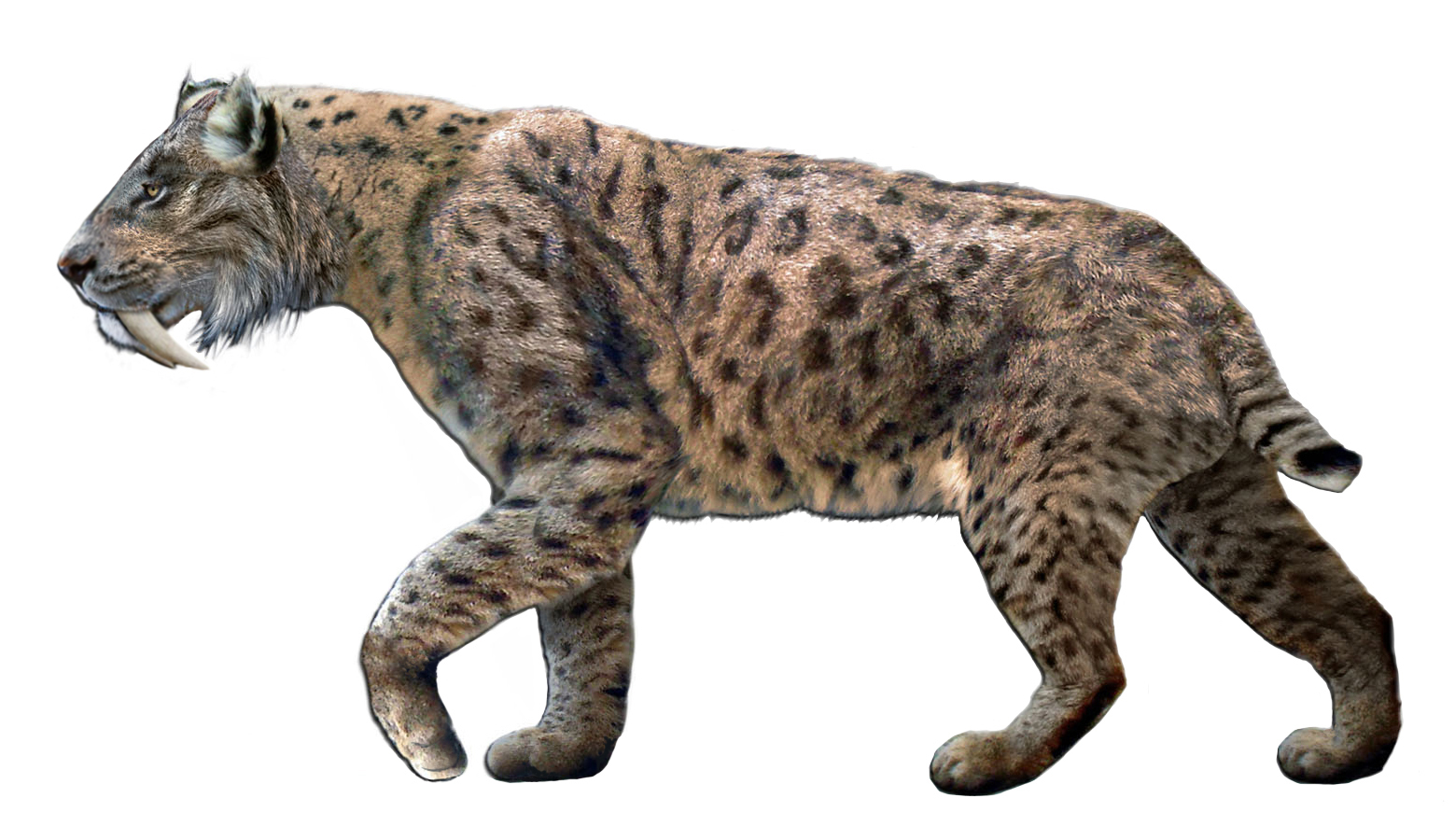
- Life restoration of the Pleistocene-Holocene saber-tooth cat Smilodon
  †Smilodon
  - †Smilodon fatalis
- †Solarium
- Solen
- Sorex
  - †Sorex cinereus
  - †Sorex fumeus
- Spermophilus
  - †Spermophilus tridecemlineatus
- †Sphyraenodus
- Sphyrna
- Spilogale
  - †Spilogale putorius – type locality for species
- Spisula
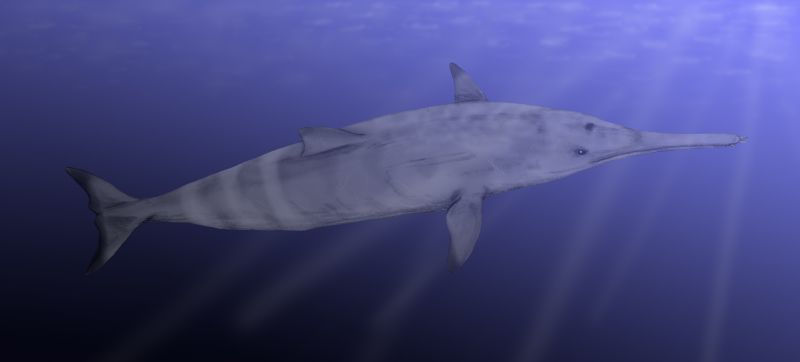
- Life restoration of the Oligocene-Miocene shark-toothed dolphin Squalodon
  †Squalodon
  - †Squalodon calvertensis – type locality for species
- Squatina
- Squilla
  - †Squilla empusa
- Stewartia
- Stramonita
- Strioterebrum
- †Syllomus
- Sylvilagus
  - †Sylvilagus floridanus
- Illustration of a living Synaptomys, or bog lemming
  Synaptomys
  - †Synaptomys cooperi
- Syrnola
- Tagelus
- Tamias
  - †Tamias striatus
- Tamiasciurus
  - †Tamiasciurus hudsonicus
- †Tapiravus
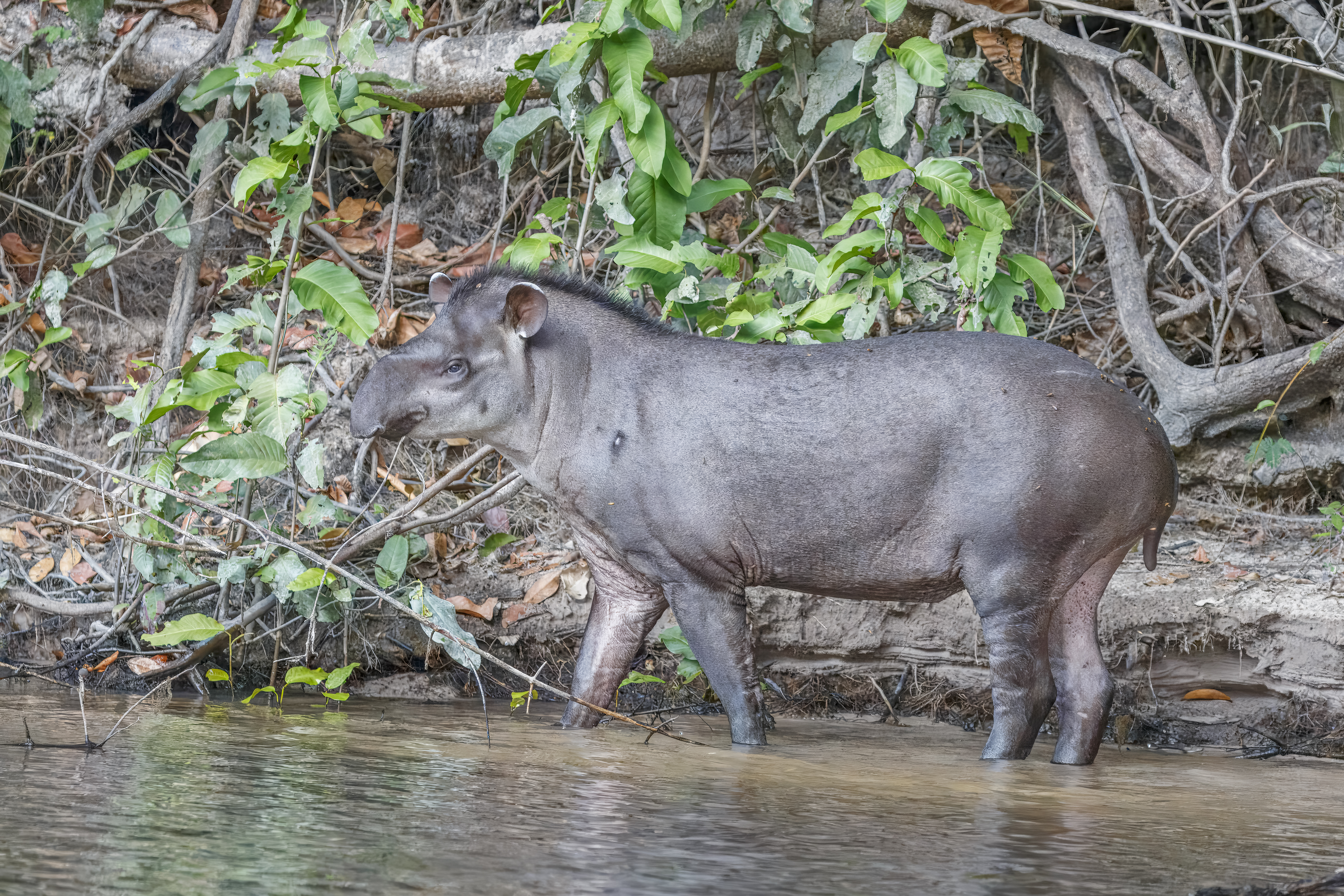
- A living Tapirus, or tapir
  Tapirus
- †Tasbacka
- Taxidea
  - †Taxidea taxus – type locality for species
- Teinostoma
- Tellina
- Terebra
- Terebratula
- Teredo
- Terrapene
  - †Terrapene carolina
- Testudo
- Textularia
- Thamnophis
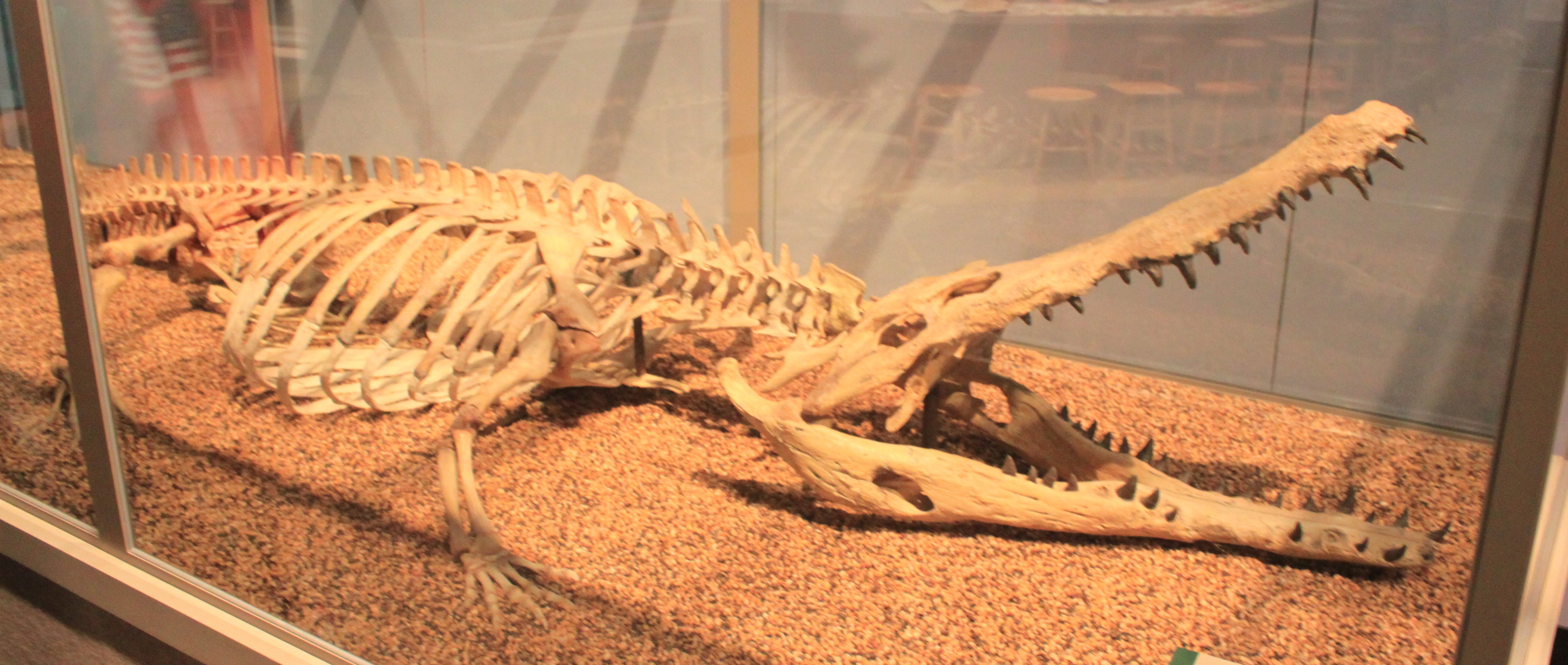
- Fossilized skeleton of the Oligocene-Miocene gavial relative Thecachampsa
  †Thecachampsa
  - †Thecachampsa antiqua
- Thomomys – type locality for genus
- Thracia
- Tremarctos
  - †Tremarctos floridanus
- Triloculina
- Trionyx – report made of unidentified related form or using admittedly obsolete nomenclature
- Triphora
- Tritonium
- Trochita
- †Trygon
- †Tuba – tentative report
- Turricula – report made of unidentified related form or using admittedly obsolete nomenclature
- Turris – report made of unidentified related form or using admittedly obsolete nomenclature
- Turritella
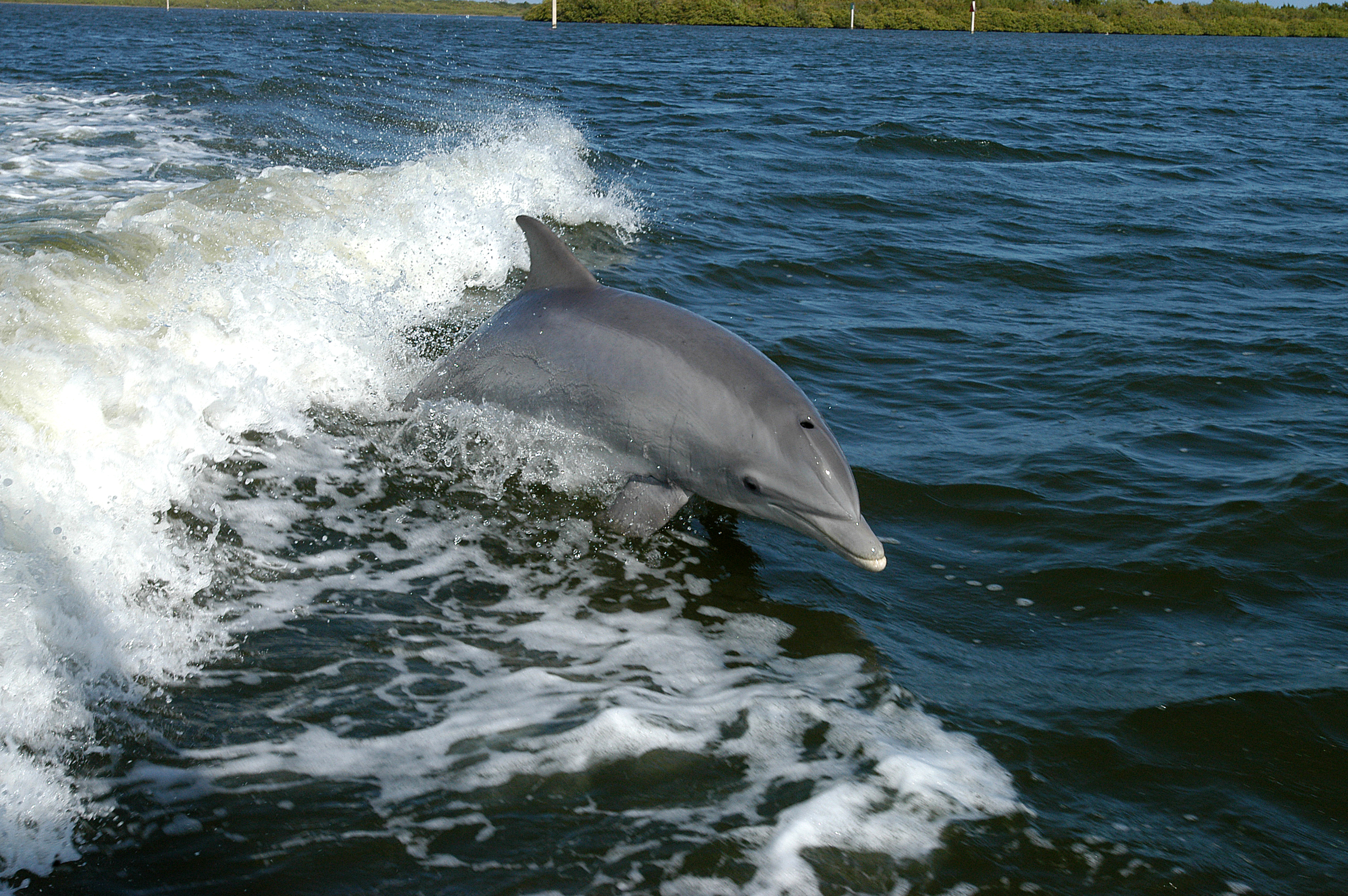
- A living Tursiops, or bottlenose dolphin
  Tursiops
- Typhis
- Umbraculum – tentative report
- Urosalpinx
  - †Urosalpinx cinerea
- Ursus
  - †Ursus americanus
- Venericardia
- Vespertilio
- Vitrinella
- Volutifusus
- Vulpes
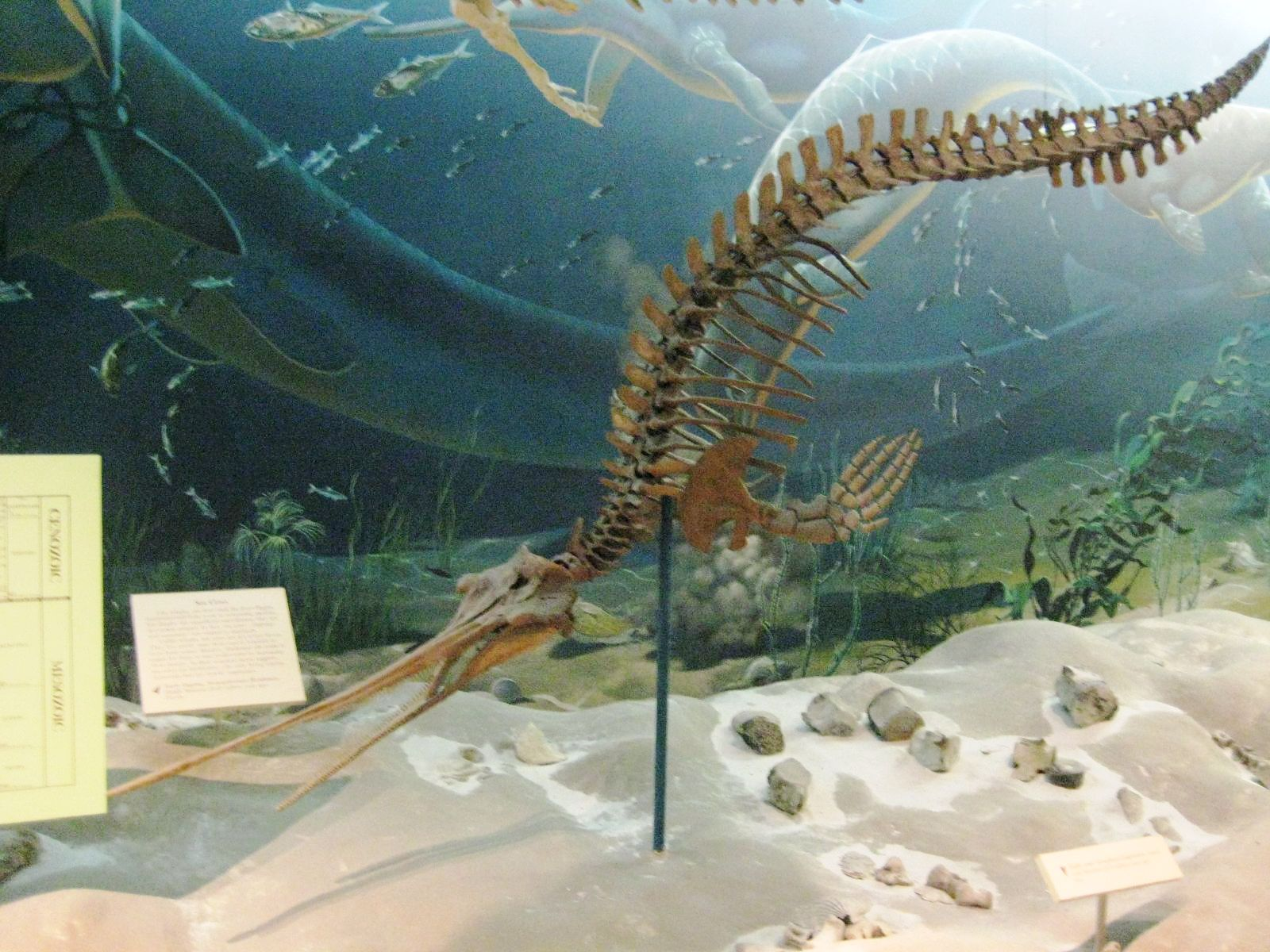
- Fossilized skeleton of the Miocene whale Xiphiacetus
  †Xiphiacetus
- Xiphias
- Yoldia
  - †Yoldia limatula
