= List of the Cenozoic life of Alaska =

This list of the Cenozoic life of Alaska contains the various prehistoric life-forms whose fossilized remains have been reported from within the US state of Alaska and are between 66 million and 10,000 years of age.

== A ==
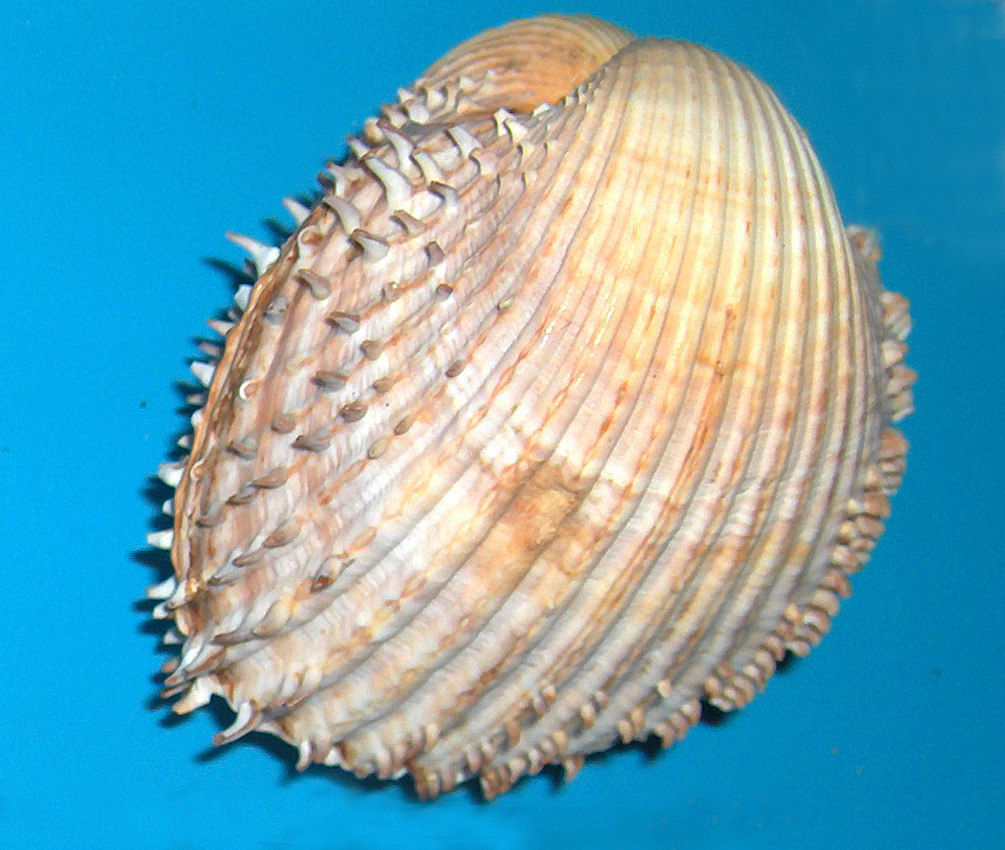
- Shell of an Acanthocardia cockle
  Acanthocardia
  - †Acanthocardia brewerii
- Acila
  - †Acila brevis – or unidentified related form
  - †Acila castrensis
  - †Acila ermani
  - †Acila gettysburgensis
  - †Acila praedivaricata – or unidentified related form
  - †Acila shumardi
  - †Acila taliaferroi
- Acirsa
  - †Acirsa borealis
- Acmaea
  - †Acmaea sybaritica
- Acrotrichis – tentative report
- †Ademete
- Agonum
- †Ainus
- Alaocybites
  - †Alaocybites egorovi – tentative report
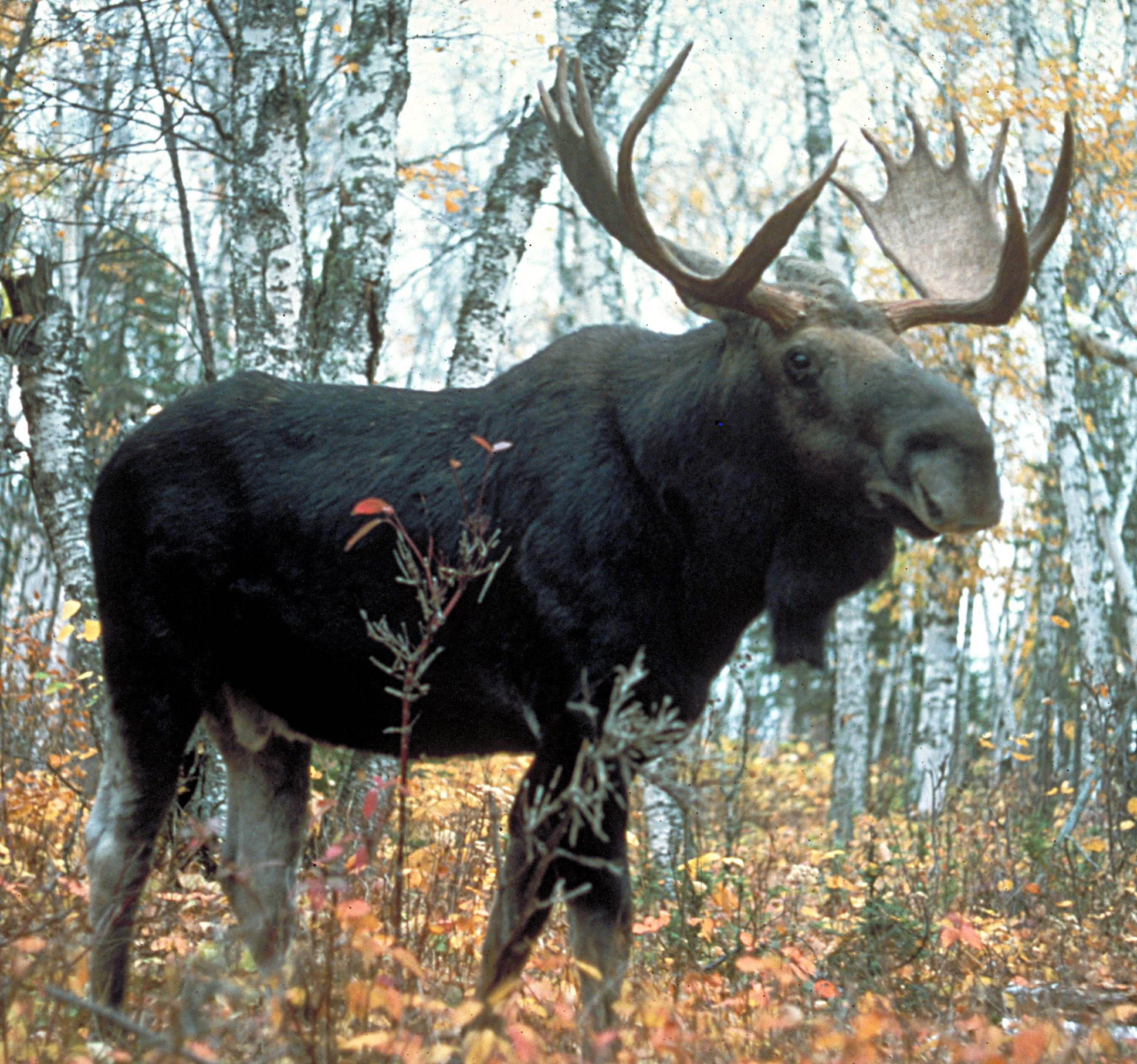
- A living Alces, or moose
  Alces
- Alnus
  - †Alnus carpinoides
- Alopex
  - †Alopex lagopus
- Alvania
  - †Alvania aurivillii
- Amara
- Amauropsis
  - †Amauropsis fetteri – type locality for species
- Anabathron
  - †Anabathron muriel
- Ancistrolepis
  - †Ancistrolepis beringianus
  - †Ancistrolepis eucosmius
- †Anechinocardium
  - †Anechinocardium lorenzanum – or unidentified related form
- Angulus
  - †Angulus lutea
- †Anomalisipho – tentative report
- Anomia – tentative report
- †Aperiploma
  - †Aperiploma bainbridgensis
- Aphaenogaster
- Arca
- Arctica
  - †Arctica carteriana
  - †Arctica ovata
- †Arcticlam – type locality for genus
  - †Arcticlam nanseni – type locality for species
- †Arctodus
  - †Arctodus simus
- Argobuccinum
  - †Argobuccinum oregonensis
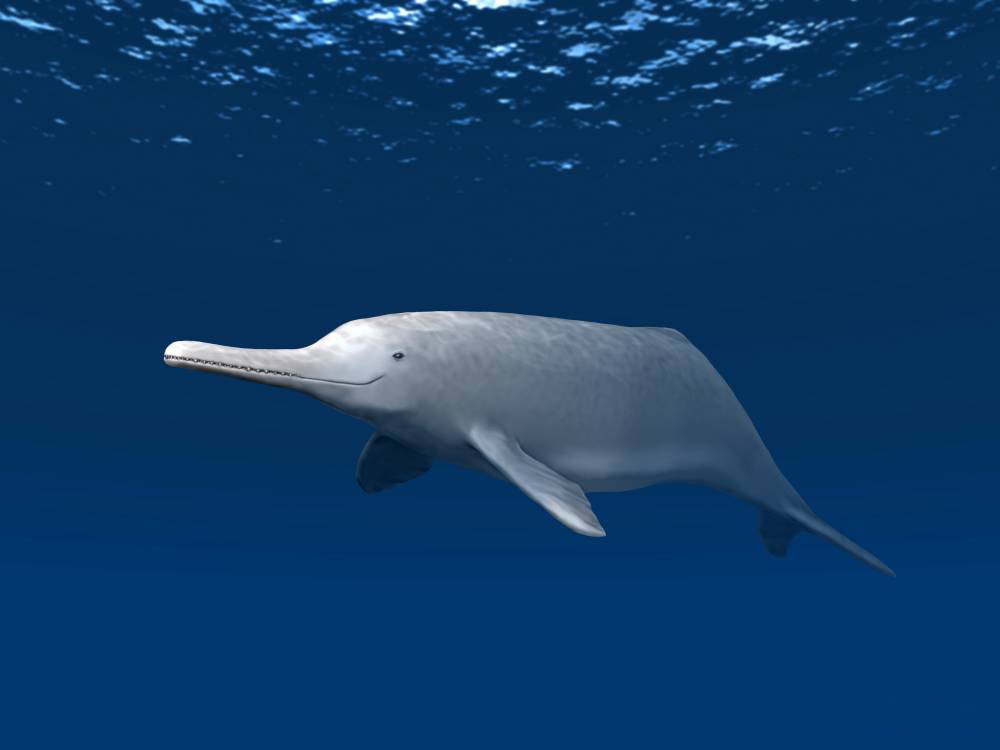
- Life restoration of the Oligocene river dolphin Arktocara
  †Arktocara – type locality for genus
  - †Arktocara yakataga – type locality for species
- Arrhenopeplus
  - †Arrhenopeplus tesserula
- Asaphidion
  - †Asaphidion yukonense – or unidentified comparable form
- Asinus
  - †Asinus kiang – or unidentified comparable form
- Astarte
  - †Astarte arctica
  - †Astarte bennetti
  - †Astarte borealis
  - †Astarte compacta
  - †Astarte crenata – or unidentified comparable form
  - †Astarte hemicymata
  - †Astarte laurentiana – or unidentified related form
  - †Astarte martini
  - †Astarte nortonensis
  - †Astarte vernicosa
- Astrangia
  - †Astrangia boreas – type locality for species
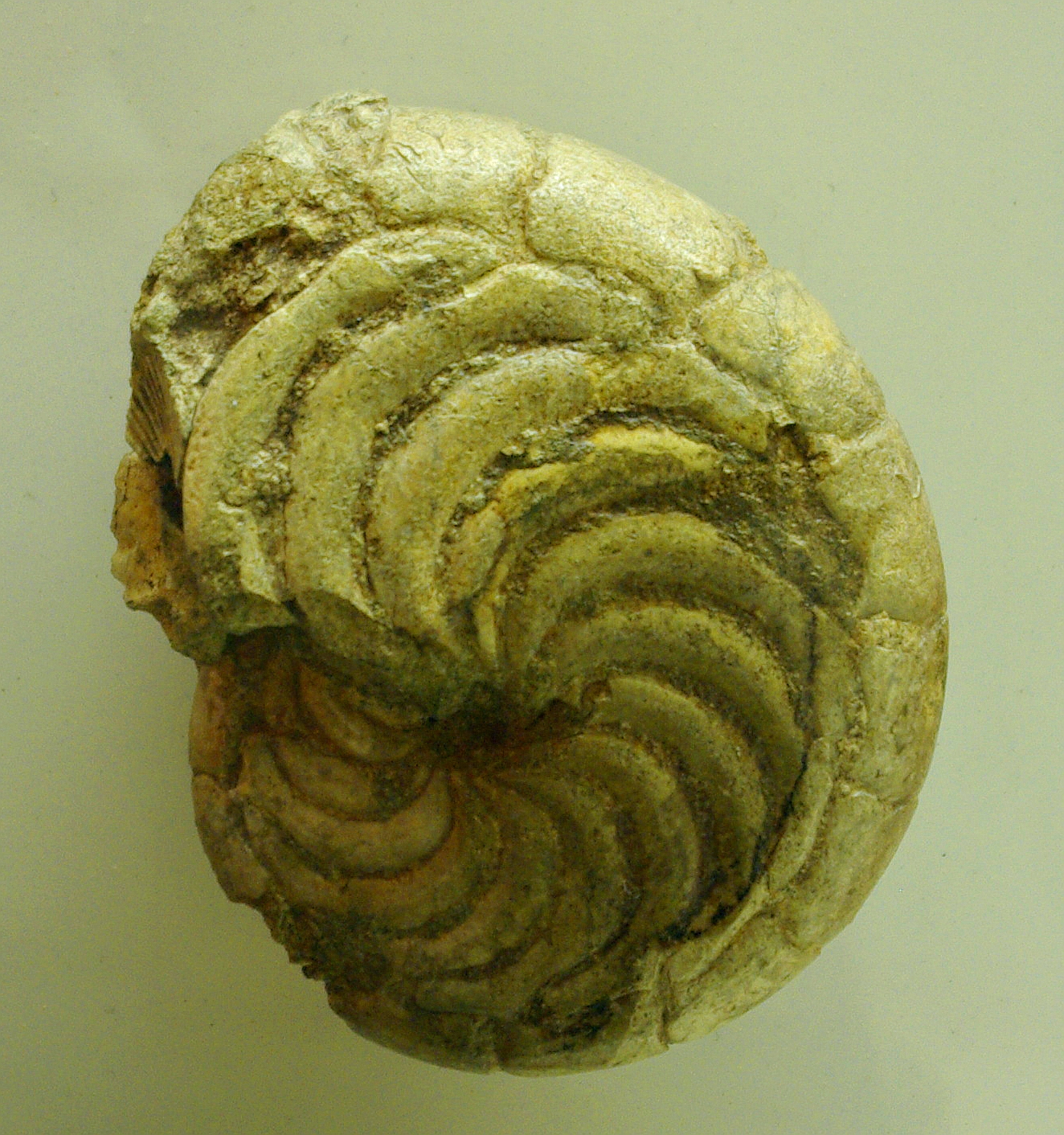
- Fossilized shell of the Paleocene-Miocene nautiloid cephalopod Aturia
  †Aturia
  - †Aturia alaskensis – type locality for species
  - †Aturia angustata
- Axinopsida
  - †Axinopsida orbiculata – or unidentified comparable form

== B ==
- Balanus
  - †Balanus balanoides
  - †Balanus balanus
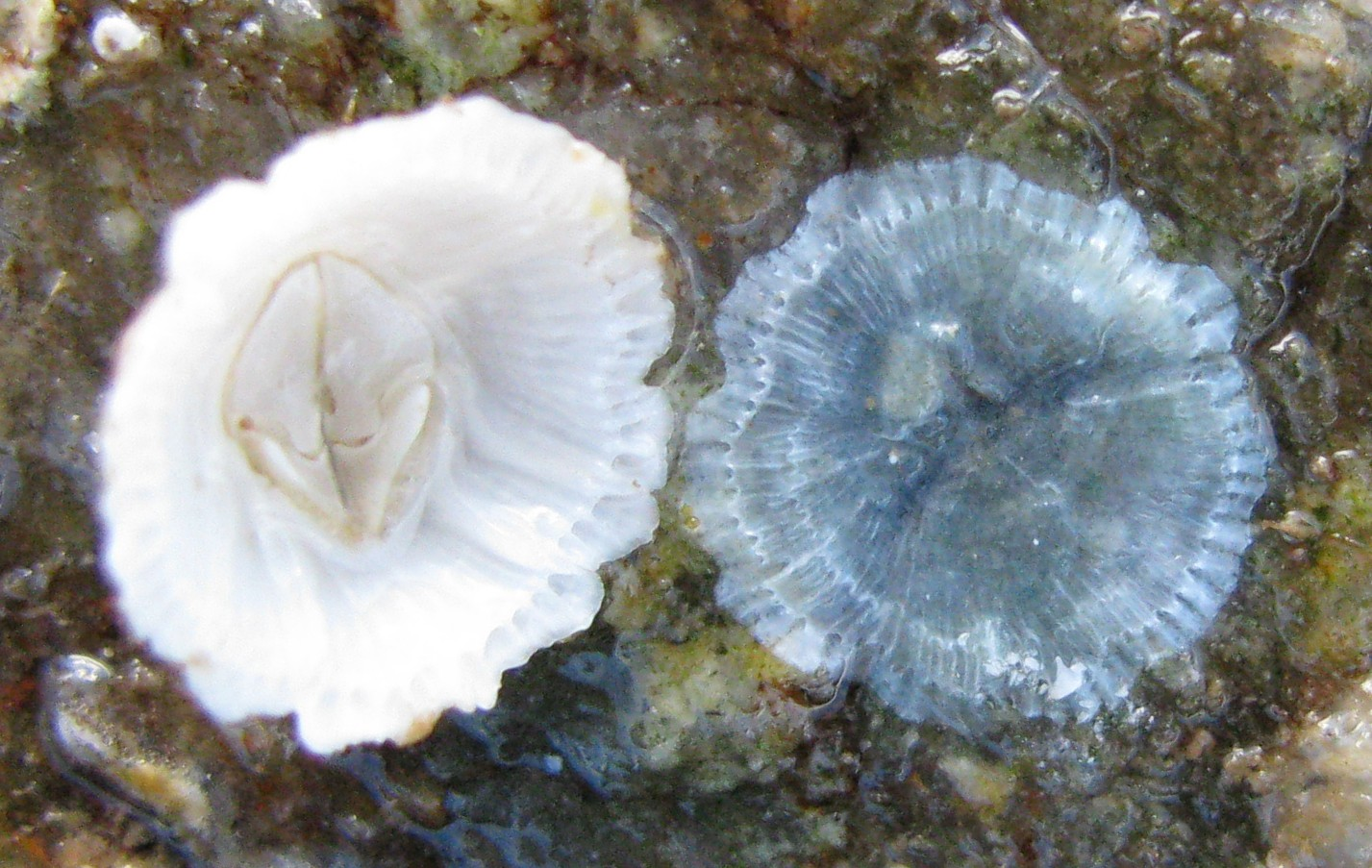
  - Shell (left, internal view) and calcified basis (right) of a modern Balanus crenatus acorn barnacle
    †Balanus crenatus
  - †Balanus evermanni
  - †Balanus nubilus – or unidentified comparable form
  - †Balanus rostratus
- Bembidion
- Beringius
  - †Beringius crebricostatus
  - †Beringius hertleini
- Betula
- Bibio
- Bison
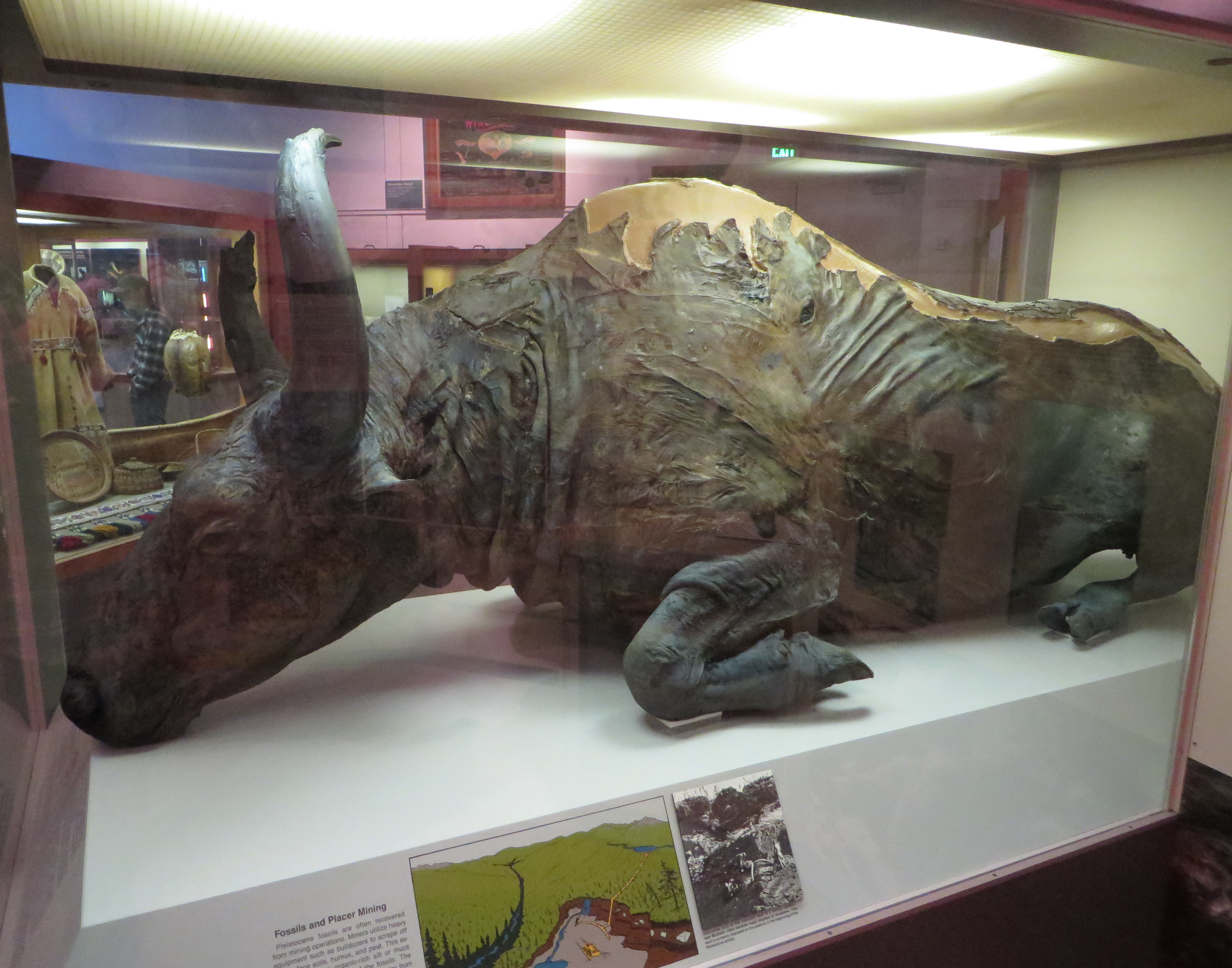
  - Mummified specimen found in Alaska of the Pleistocene-Holocene Bison priscus, or steppe bison. This specimen, known as "Blue Babe" after the blue ox of Paul Bunyan folklore, derives its unusual coloration from a chemical reaction between the phosphorus in its skin and iron in the surrounding soil to produce a coating of vivianite.
    †Bison priscus
- Bolivina
  - †Bolivina decussata
  - †Bolivina pseudopicata – or unidentified comparable form
- †Bootherium
  - †Bootherium bombifrons
- Boreotrophon
  - †Boreotrophon beringi
  - †Boreotrophon rotundatus – or unidentified comparable form
- Brachidontes
  - †Brachidontes matchgaransis – or unidentified comparable form
- Brachypimpla – tentative report
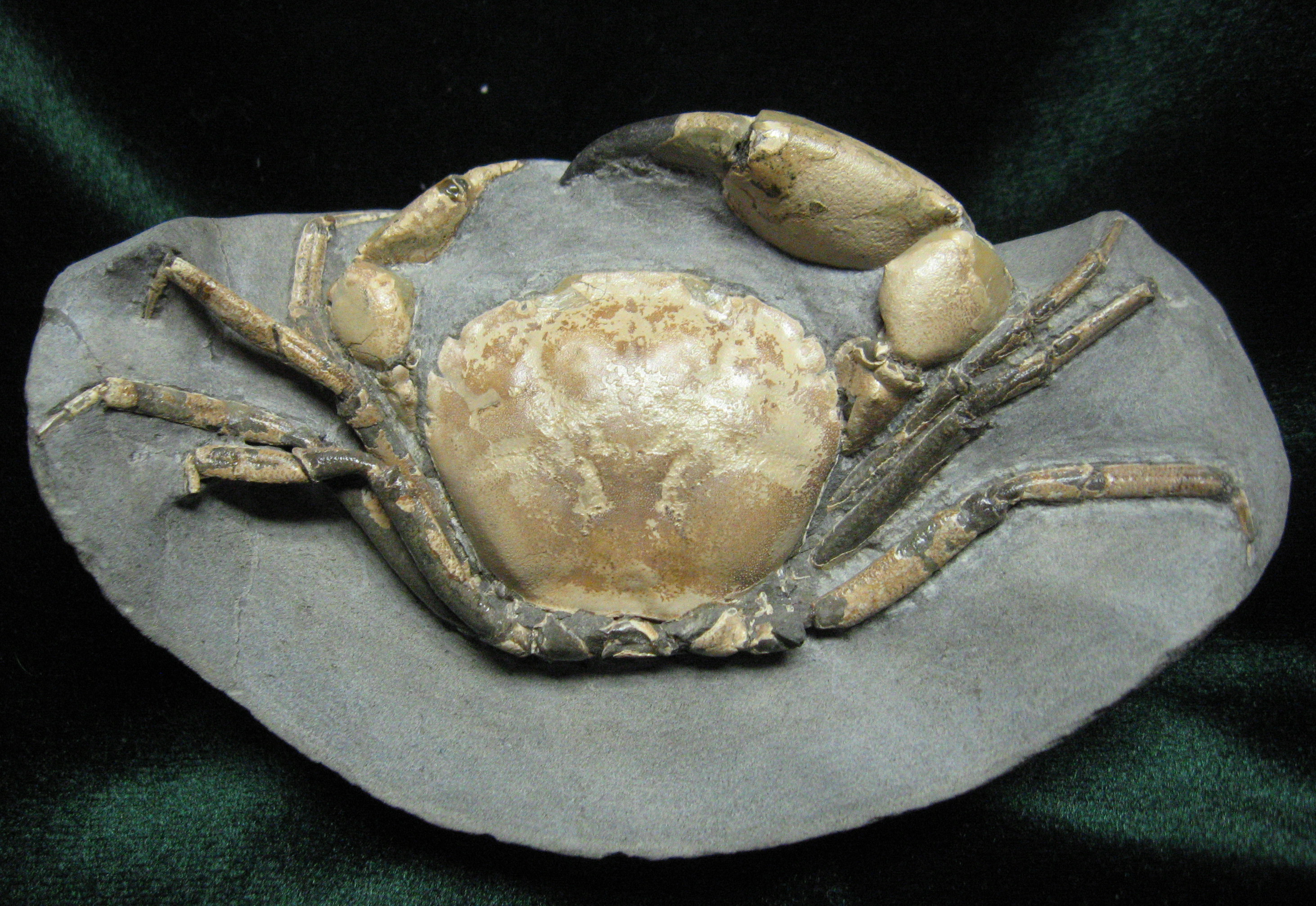
- Fossil of the Eocene crab Branchioplax
  †Branchioplax
  - †Branchioplax washingtoniana
- †Bruclarkia
  - †Bruclarkia andersoni – or unidentified comparable form
- Buccella
  - †Buccella frigida
- Buccinum
  - †Buccinum angulosum
  - †Buccinum glaciale
  - †Buccinum kurodai – tentative report
  - †Buccinum ochotense – or unidentified related form
  - †Buccinum pemphigus – or unidentified comparable form
  - †Buccinum percrassum
  - †Buccinum physematum
  - †Buccinum planeticum – or unidentified comparable form
- Bulbus
  - †Bulbus fragilis
- Byrrhus

== C ==
- Cadulus
  - †Cadulus arcticus
- Calliostoma
- Callorhinus
  - †Callorhinus ursinus
- Calyptraea
  - †Calyptraea alaskana – or unidentified comparable form
  - †Calyptraea diegoana – or unidentified comparable form
- Camponotus
- Cancellaria
- Canis
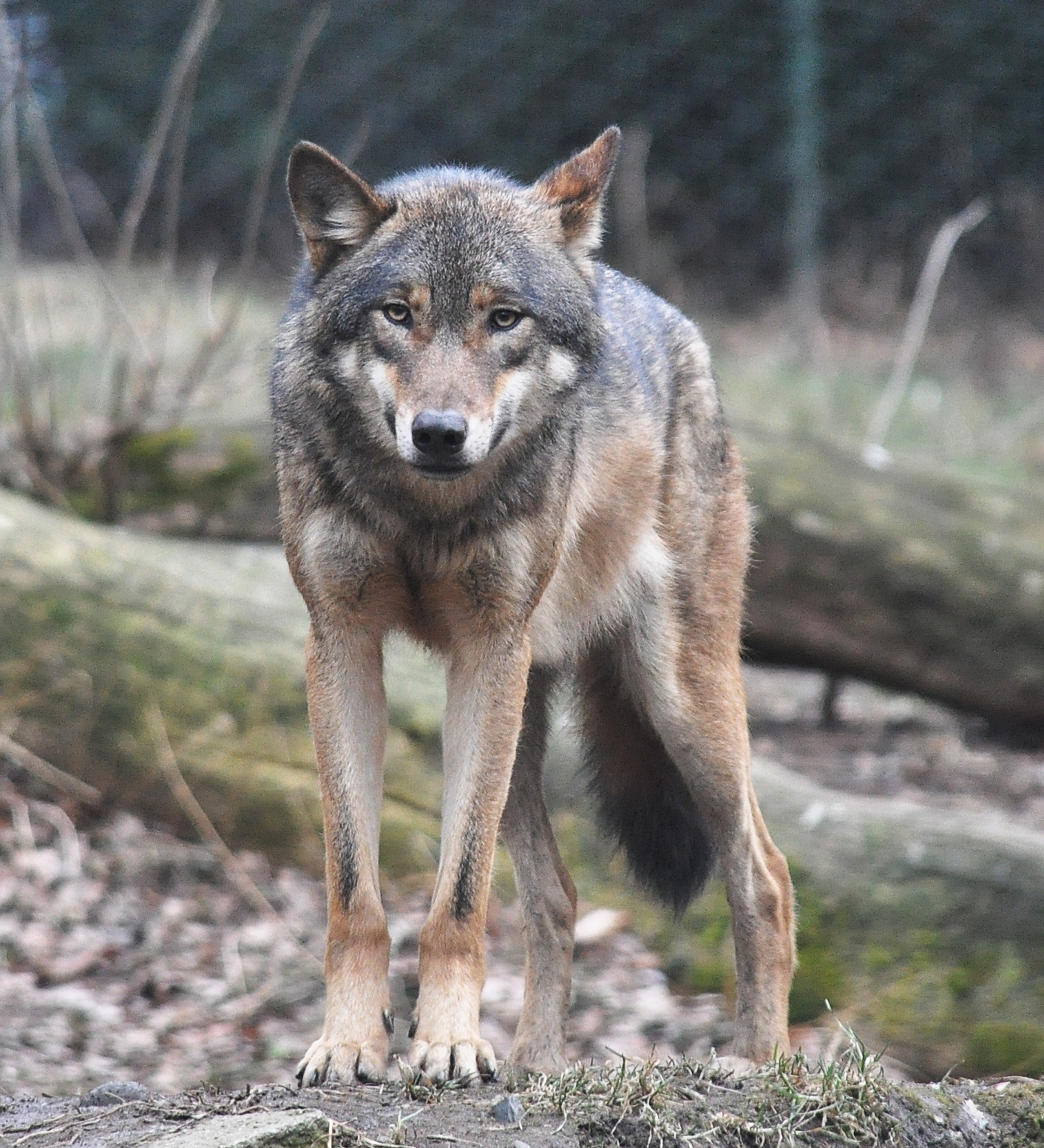
  - A living Canis lupus, or gray wolf
    †Canis lupus
- Carabus
  - †Carabus nemoralis – or unidentified comparable form
  - †Carabus truncaticollis – or unidentified comparable form
- †Carex
- Caryophyllia
  - †Caryophyllia arnoldi
- Cassidulina
  - †Cassidulina californica
  - †Cassidulina islandica
  - †Cassidulina teretis
  - †Cassidulina tortuosa
- Castalia
- †Castanaea
  - †Castanaea castaneaefolia
- Castanea
  - †Castanea cataneaefolia
- Cepheus
  - †Cepheus corae – or unidentified comparable form
- Ceratoppia – tentative report
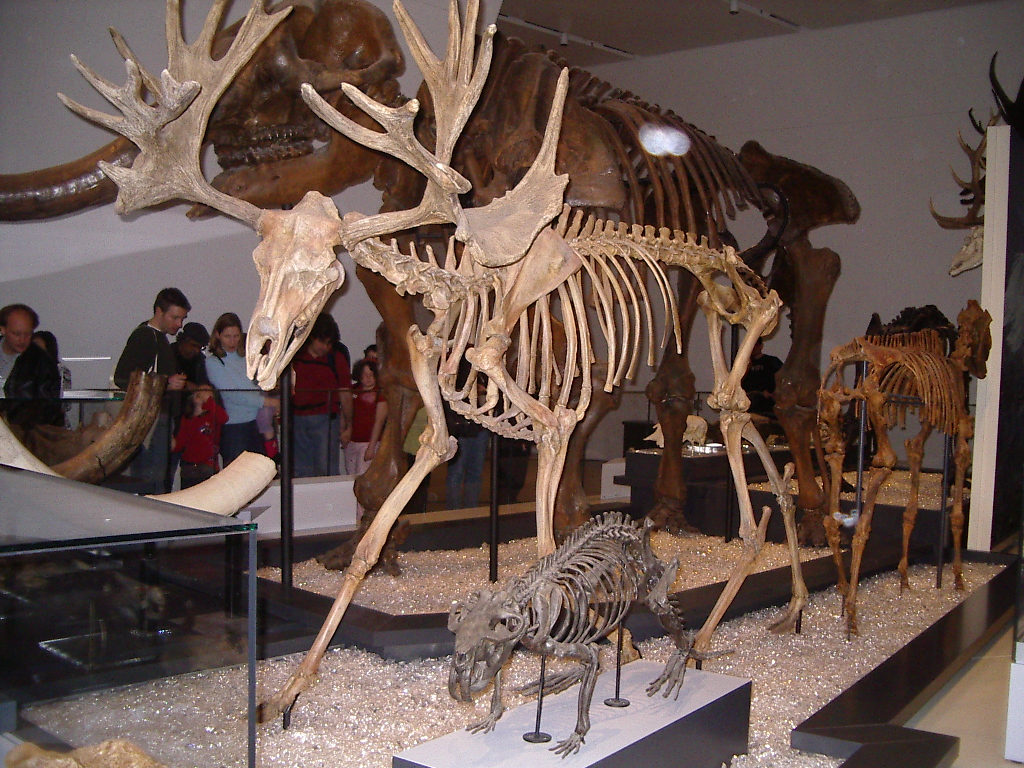
- Fossilized skeleton of the Pliocene-Pleistocene cervid Cervalces, or the stag moose
  †Cervalces
- Cervus
  - †Cervus elaphus
- Ceutorhynchus – tentative report
- Chama
- Chione
  - †Chione ensifera
- Chirona
  - †Chirona alaskana – type locality for species
  - †Chirona evermanni
- Chlamys
  - †Chlamys alaskensis
  - †Chlamys albida
  - †Chlamys aquilonia
  - †Chlamys ashiyaensis – or unidentified related form
  - †Chlamys ashiynensis
  - †Chlamys coatsi
  - †Chlamys cosibensis
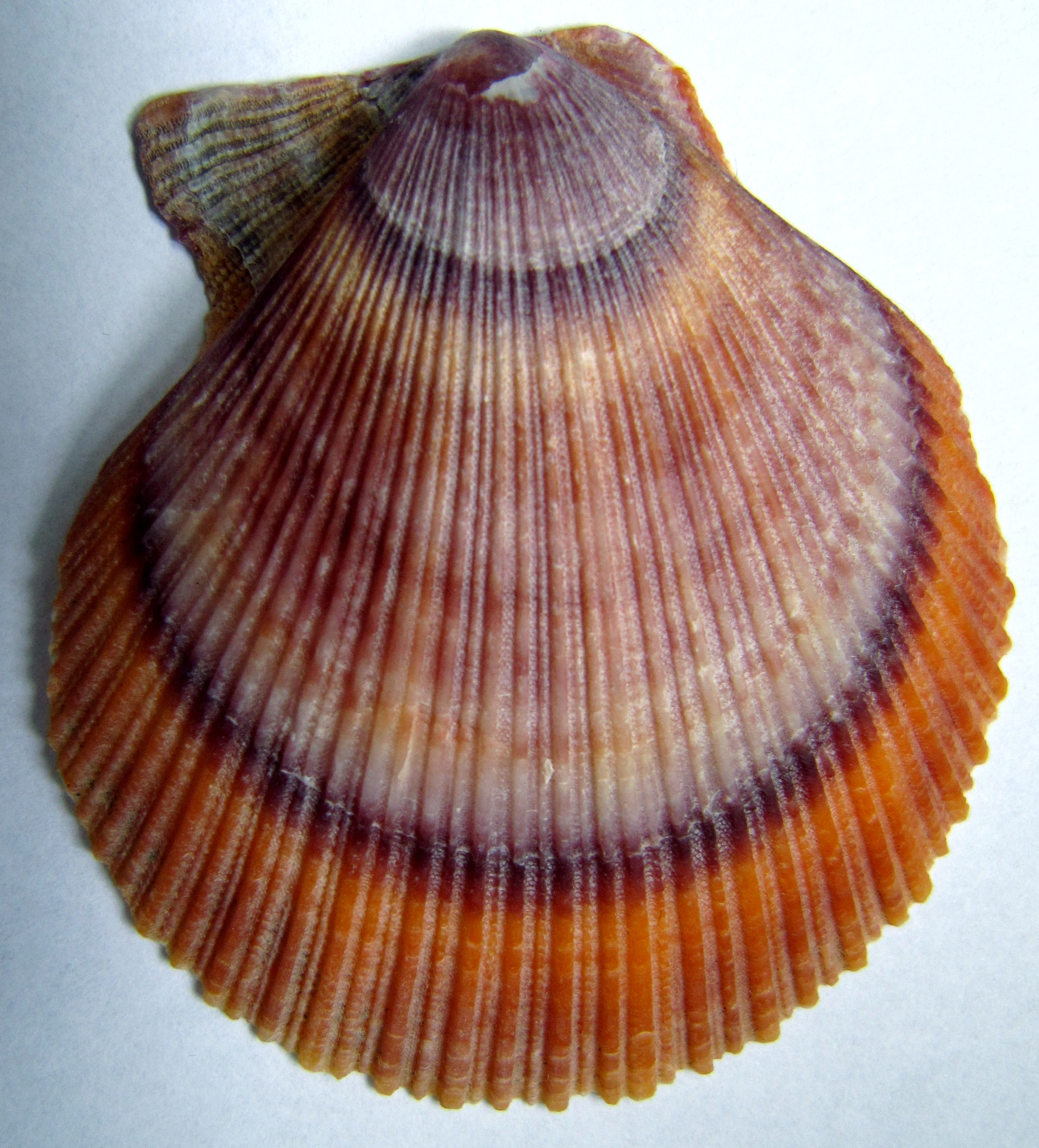
  - A modern shell of Chlamys islandica, or Iceland scallop
    †Chlamys islandica
  - †Chlamys nuwokensis
  - †Chlamys rubida
- †Chrysodomus – tentative report
- Chrysolina
- †Chrysomelites – type locality for genus
  - †Chrysomelites alaskanus – type locality for species
- Cibicides
  - †Cibicides lobatulus
- Ciliatocardium
  - †Ciliatocardium ciliatum
  - †Ciliatocardium islandicum – or unidentified related form
- Cingula
  - †Cingula martyni
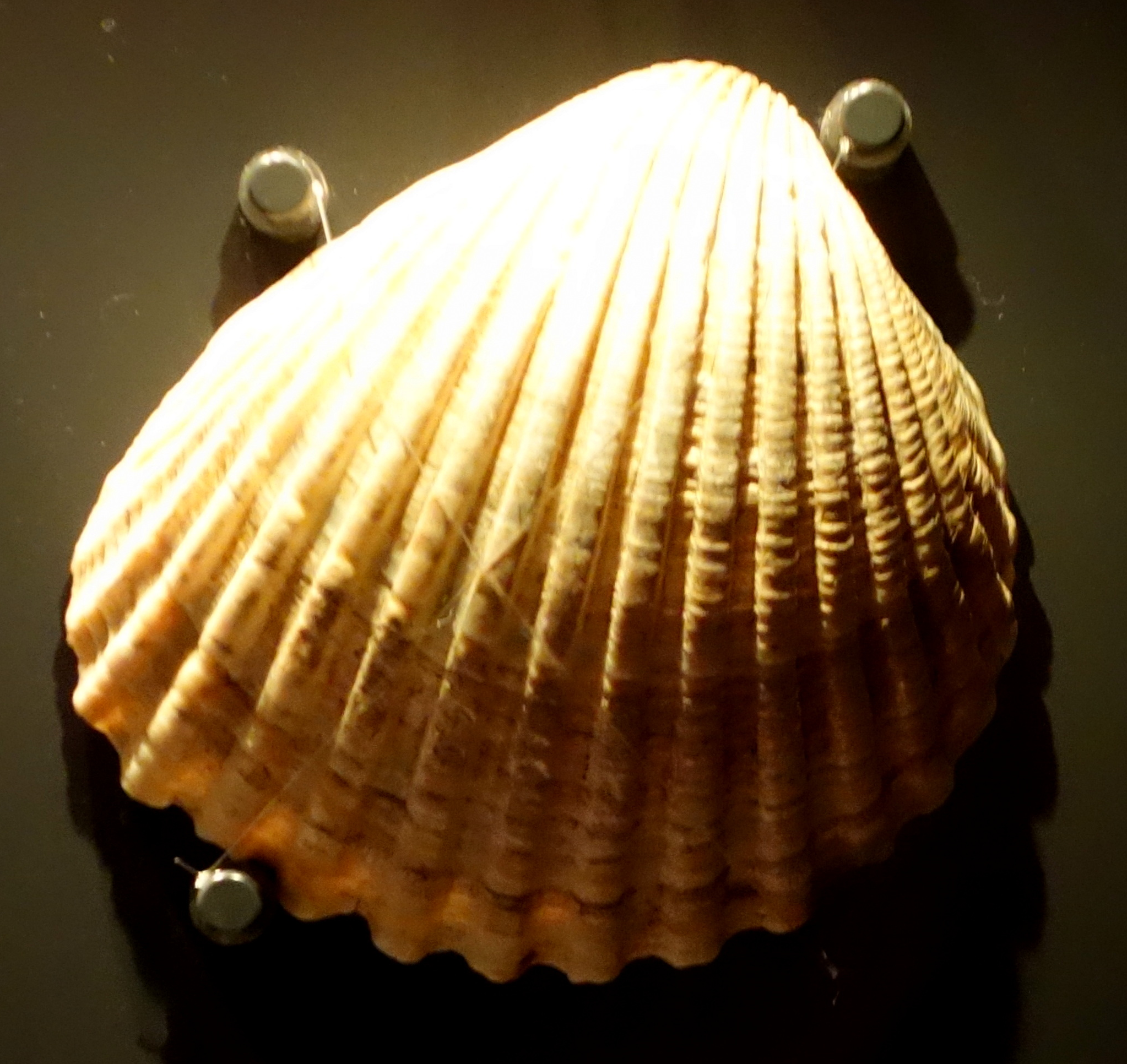
- Shell of a Clinocardium cockle
  Clinocardium
  - †Clinocardium californiense – or unidentified comparable form
  - †Clinocardium hannibali
  - †Clinocardium makiyamae
  - †Clinocardium meekianum
  - †Clinocardium nuttallii
  - †Clinocardium pristinum
- Colus
  - †Colus halibrectus – or unidentified related form
  - †Colus spitsbergensis
- †Conchocele
  - †Conchocele bisecta
- Corbicula
  - †Corbicula bibaiensis – or unidentified comparable form
  - †Corbicula muratai – or unidentified comparable form
- Corbula
  - †Corbula betsyae – type locality for species
- †Cornwallius
  - †Cornwallius sookensis
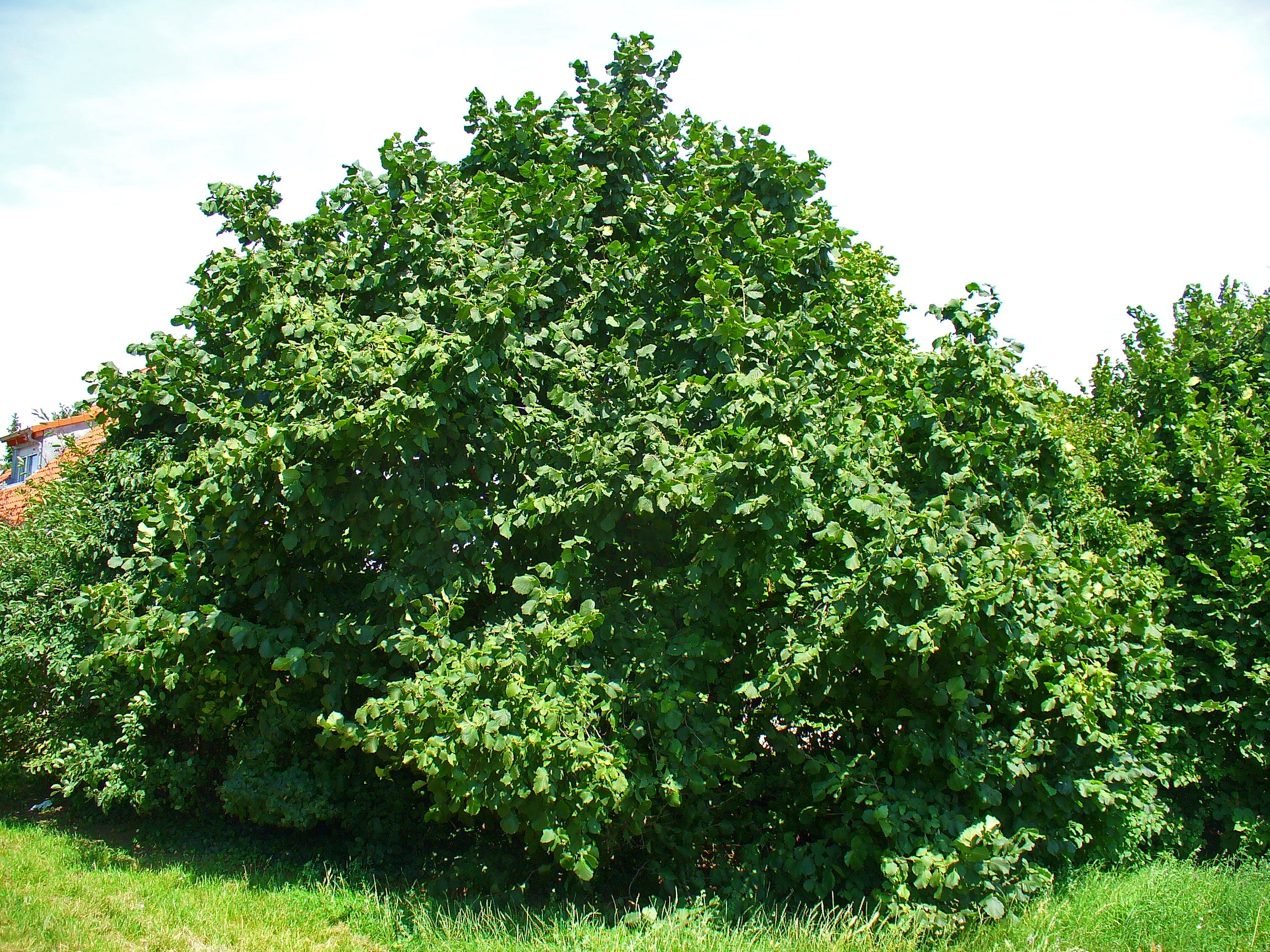
- A living Corylus, or hazel
  †Corylus
  - †Corylus macquarri
- Costacallista
  - †Costacallista conradiana
- Crassatella
  - †Crassatella mathewsoni – or unidentified related form
  - †Crassatella nipponicus – or unidentified comparable form
- Crenella
  - †Crenella kannoi – type locality for species
  - †Crenella porterensis
- Crepidula
  - †Crepidula ungana
- Cryptonatica
  - †Cryptonatica affinis
- Cyclocardia
  - †Cyclocardia belogolovensis
  - †Cyclocardia crassidens
  - †Cyclocardia crebricostata
  - †Cyclocardia ezoensis
  - †Cyclocardia nuwokensis
  - †Cyclocardia roundiformis
  - †Cyclocardia sakamotoi
  - †Cyclocardia subcrassidens
  - †Cyclocardia subnipponica – or unidentified comparable form
  - †Cyclocardia tokunagai – or unidentified comparable form
  - †Cyclocardia wajampolkensis – or unidentified comparable form
- †Cyclocardium
  - †Cyclocardium roundiformis – or unidentified comparable form
- Cylichna
- Cyperus
- Cyrtodaria
  - †Cyrtodaria katieae – type locality for species
  - †Cyrtodaria kurriana
  - †Cyrtodaria rutupiensis

== D ==
- Dasiops – tentative report
- Delphinapterus – tentative report
- Dentalium
  - †Dentalium nunomae – or unidentified comparable form
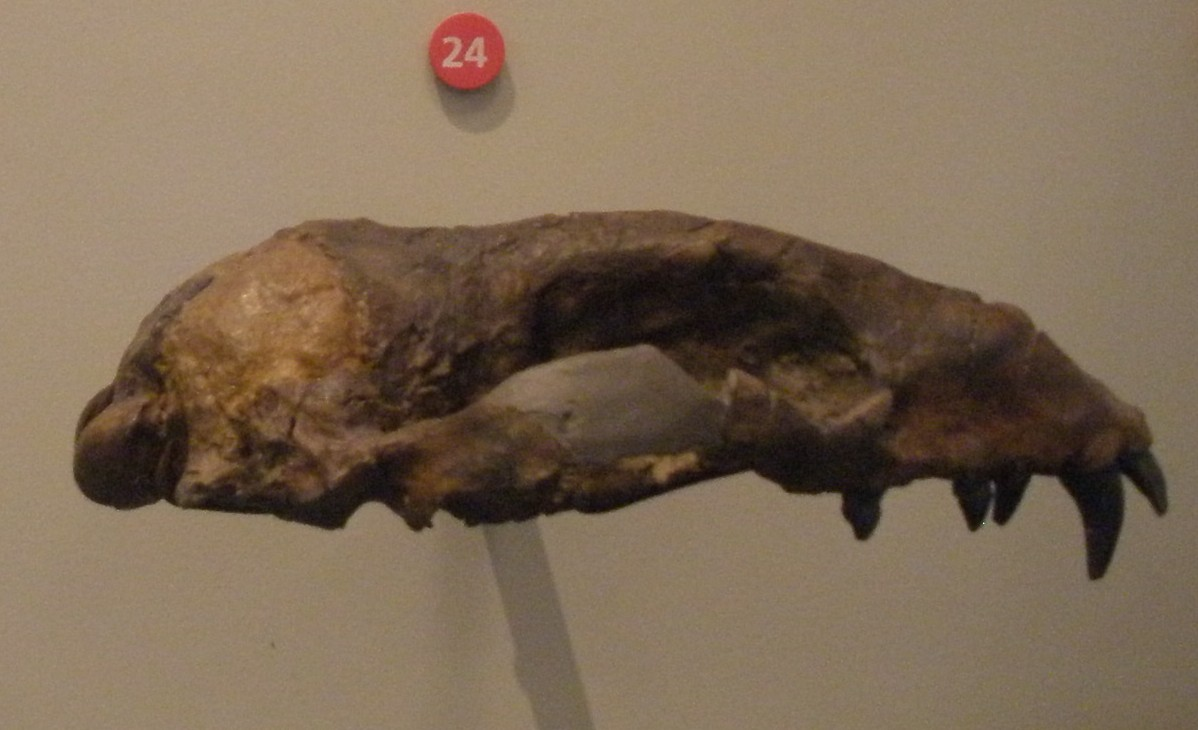
- Fossilized cranium of the Miocene seal Desmatophoca
  †Desmatophoca – tentative report
- Diacheila
  - †Diacheila matthewsi
- Dicrostonyx
- Diestothyris
  - †Diestothyris frontalis
- Dioon
  - †Dioon praespinulosum – type locality for species
- Diplodonta
  - †Diplodonta aleutica
  - †Diplodonta parilis
- †Dryophyllum
  - †Dryophyllum stanleyanum
- Dyschirius

== E ==
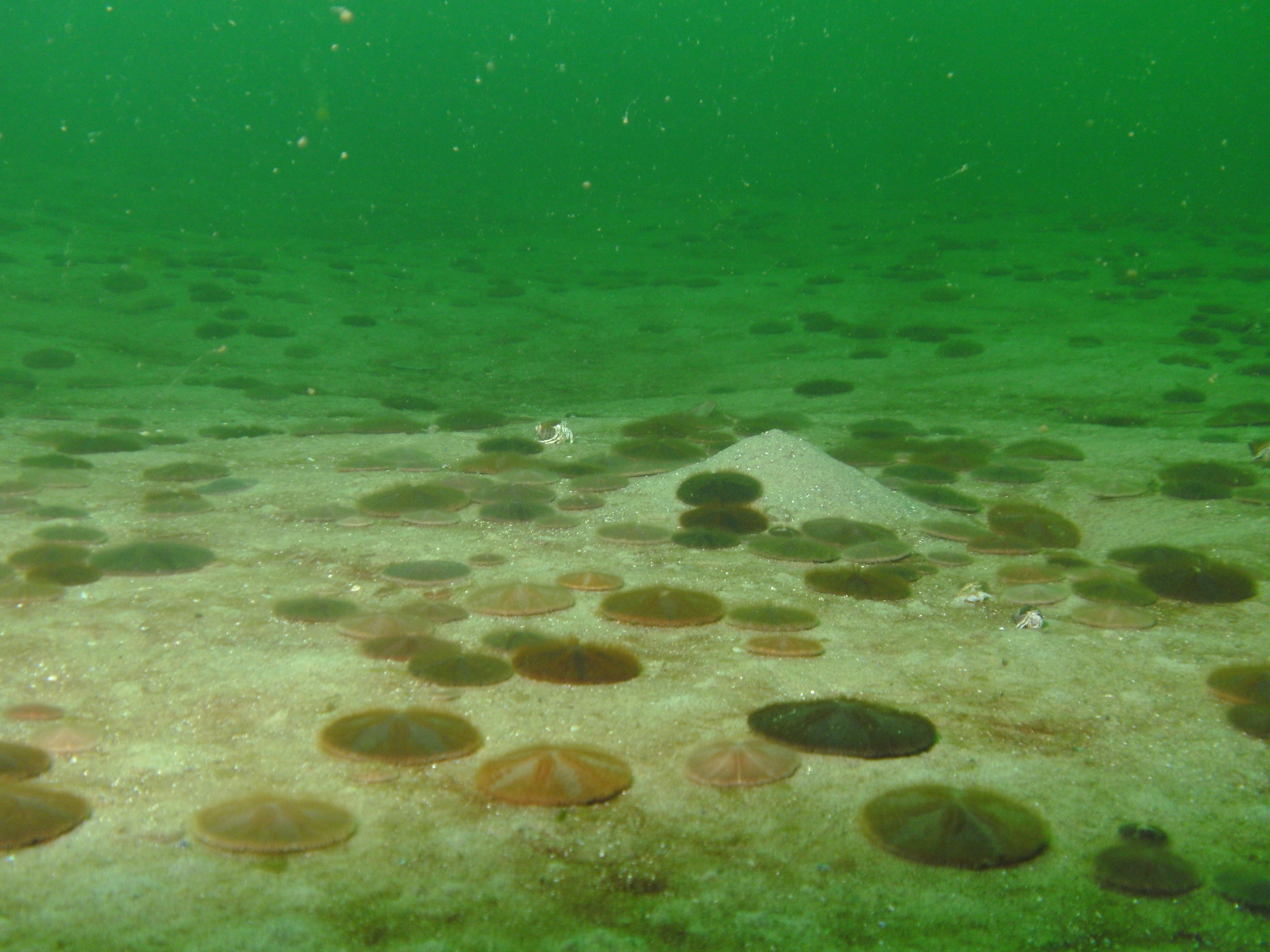
- Seafloor covered in living Echinarachnius sand dollars
  Echinarachnius
- Echinophoria
  - †Echinophoria apta
- †Ellipsoscapha
  - †Ellipsoscapha sohli – type locality for species
- Elphidiella
  - †Elphidiella arctica
- Elphidium
  - †Elphidium alaskense
  - †Elphidium clavatum
  - †Elphidium frigidum
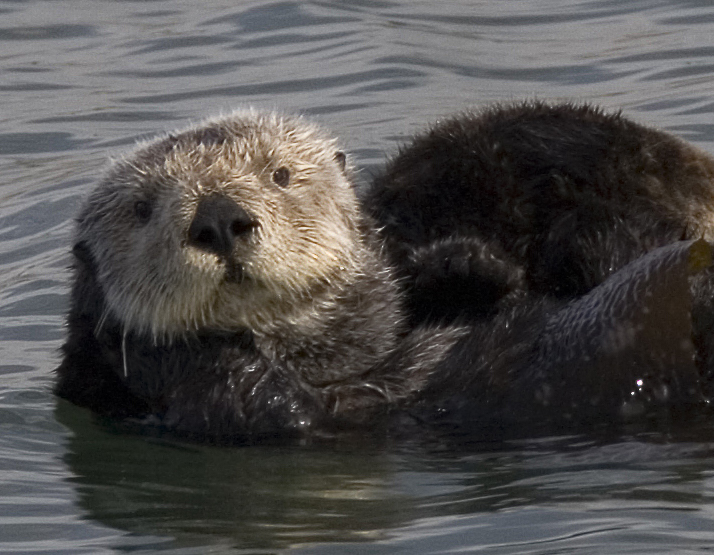
- A living Enhydra lutris, or sea otter
  Enhydra
- Enicmus
- †Epipremnum
  - †Epipremnum crassum
- Epitonium
  - †Epitonium atwoodi
  - †Epitonium greenlandicum
- Equus
  - †Equus alaskae
- Erignathus
  - †Erignathus barbatus
- Erigone
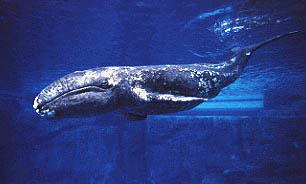
- A living Eschrichtius robustus, or gray whale
  Eschrichtius
- Eumetopias
  - †Eumetopias jubata
- †Eumorphocorystes
  - †Eumorphocorystes naselensis
- Euspira
  - †Euspira pallida
- Evalea
- †Exilia – tentative report

== F ==
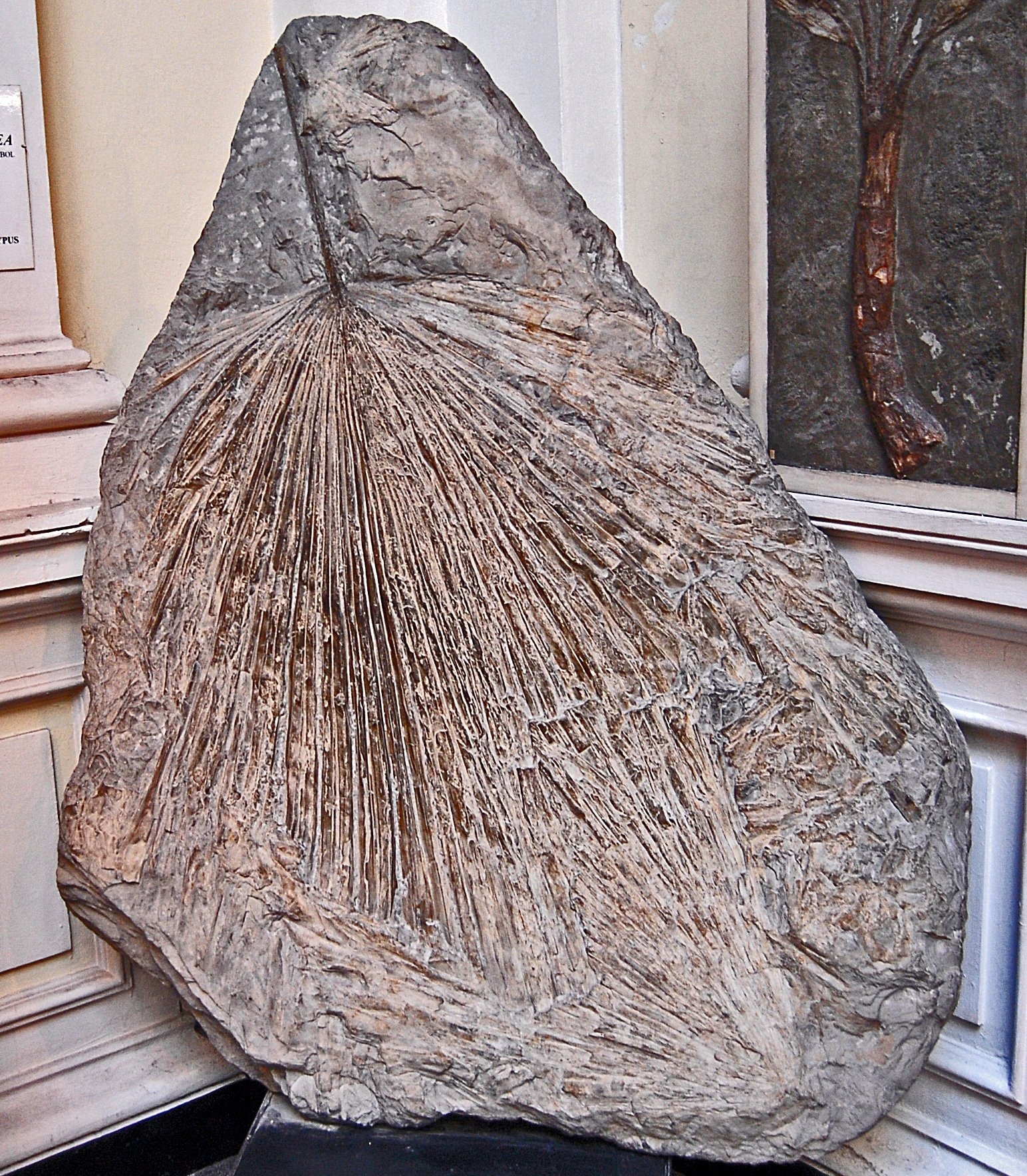
- Fossilized foliage of the Cretaceous-Oligocene flowering plant Flabellaria
  †Flabellaria
  - †Flabellaria gronlandica
- Fortipecten
  - †Fortipecten hallae
- Fulgoraria

== G ==
- Gari
  - †Gari brouwersae – type locality for species
- Georissus
- Globigerina
  - A living Globigerina bulloides foraminiferan
    †Globigerina bulloides – or unidentified related form
  - †Globigerina pachyderma
- Glycymeris
  - †Glycymeris sagittatus
  - †Glycymeris septentrionalis

== H ==
- †Hataiella
  - †Hataiella chichibuensis – or unidentified comparable form
  - †Hataiella sagai
- Helophorus
  - †Helophorus splendidus
- Hemithiris
  - †Hemithiris psittacea
- Hiatella
  - †Hiatella arctica
- Hinnites – tentative report
- Histriophoca
  - †Histriophoca fasciata
- Homalopoma – tentative report
- †Hydrodamalis
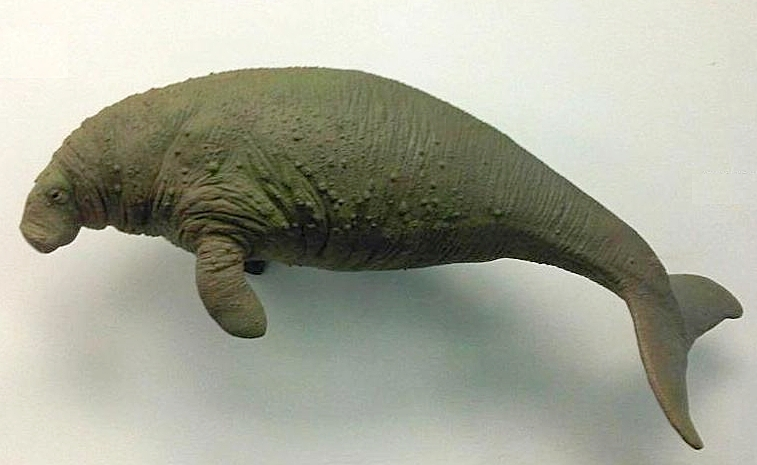
  - Restorative model of the Pleistocene-Holocene manatee relative Hydrodamalis gigas, or Steller's sea cow
    †Hydrodamalis gigas

== I ==
- †Integricardium
  - †Integricardium kennae – type locality for species
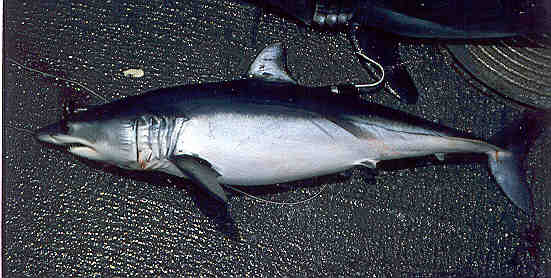
- A modern Isurus, or mako shark
  Isurus

== J ==
- †Jugina
  - †Jugina snigella
- †Juglna
  - †Juglna snigella

== K ==
- Kalissus
  - †Kalissus nitidus
- Karreriella
  - †Karreriella baccata
- †Kolponomos – or unidentified comparable form
- Kurtiella
  - †Kurtiella tumida

== L ==
- Lasiopodomys
  - †Lasiopodomys deceitensis
- †Lastraea
  - †Lastraea stiriaca
- Lathrobium
- Laurus
- Leistus
- Lemmus
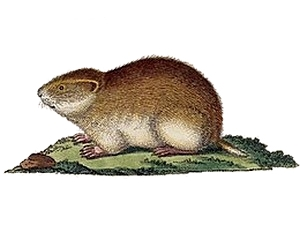
  - A living Lemmus sibiricus, or Siberian brown lemming
    †Lemmus sibiricus
- Leptothorax
- Leukoma
  - †Leukoma staylei – or unidentified comparable form
- Limatula
  - †Limatula attenuata
- Liocyma
  - †Liocyma fluctuosa
- Liomesus
  - †Liomesus nux
- Littorina
  - †Littorina sitchana
- †Lora
  - †Lora skullcliffensis
- Lucinoma
  - †Lucinoma acutilineata
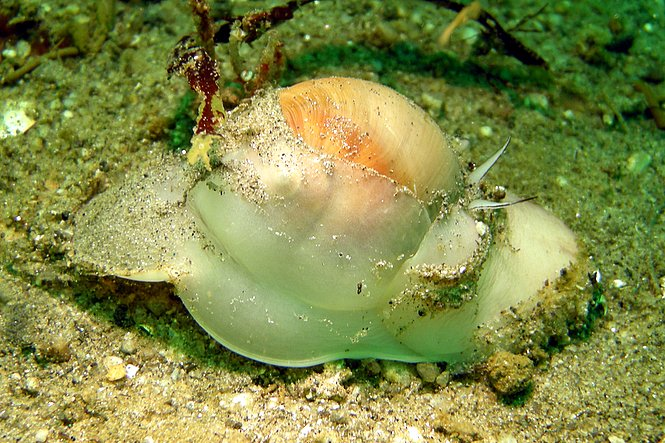
- A living Lunatia moon sea snail
  Lunatia
  - †Lunatia groenlandica – or unidentified related form
- Lyonsia
  - †Lyonsia mooreae

== M ==
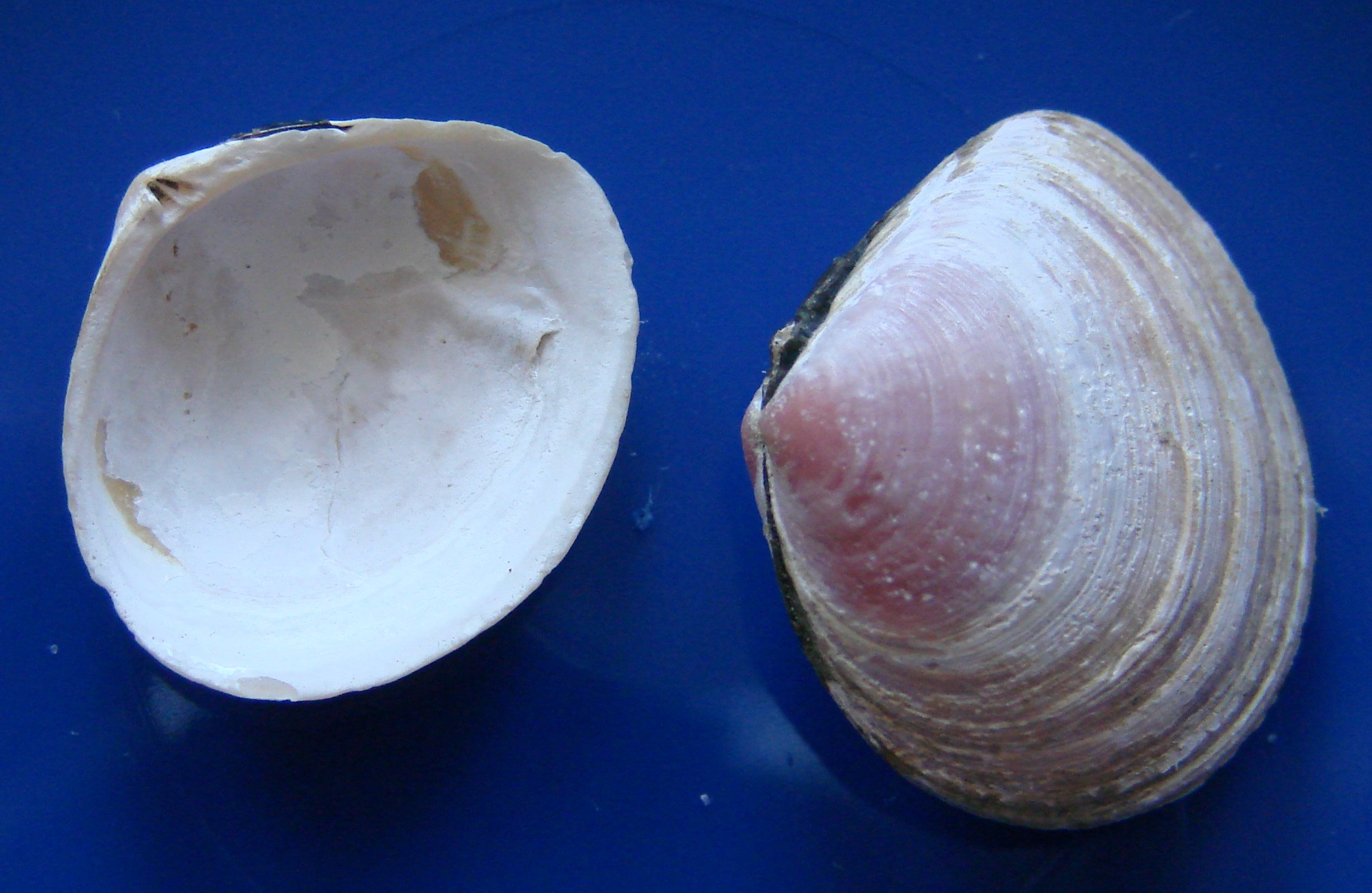
- Interior and exterior of a shell of a Macoma tellin
  Macoma
  - †Macoma albaria
  - †Macoma astori
  - †Macoma balthica – or unidentified related form
  - †Macoma brota – or unidentified related form
  - †Macoma calcarea
  - †Macoma golikovi
  - †Macoma moesta
  - †Macoma optiva
  - †Macoma twinensis
- Macrocallista – tentative report
- Mactromeris
  - †Mactromeris albaria
  - †Mactromeris brevirostrata
  - †Mactromeris polynyma
- Magnolia
  - †Magnolia inglefieldi
- †Mammut
- †Mammuthus
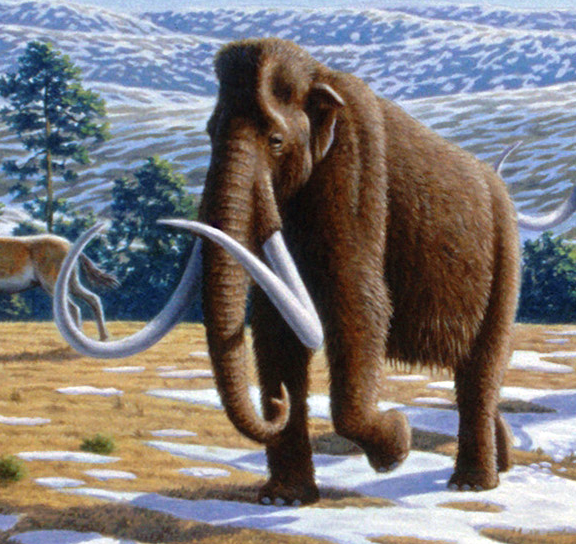
  - Restoration of a herd of Mammuthus primigenius, or wooly mammoths
    †Mammuthus primigenius
- Margarites
  - †Margarites peninsularis
- Marmota
- Martesia – tentative report
- Mathilda
  - †Mathilda amundseni – type locality for species
- Megayoldia
  - †Megayoldia montereyensis – or unidentified related form
- Messor
- †Metacarcinus
  - †Metacarcinus goederti
- Micridium
- Micropeplus
  - †Micropeplus hoogendorni – type locality for species
  - †Micropeplus hopkinsi – type locality for species
- Microtus
- Miodontiscus
  - †Miodontiscus prolongatus
- Mizuhopecten
  - †Mizuhopecten mollerensis
- Modiolus
  - †Modiolus harrimani
- †Molopophorus
  - †Molopophorus bogachielii – or unidentified comparable form
- Musculus
  - †Musculus niger
- †Mya
  - †Mya arenaria – or unidentified comparable form
  - †Mya elegans
  - †Mya grewingki
  - †Mya truncata
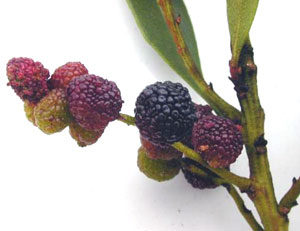
- Fruit of a living Myrica, or firetree
  Myrica
  - †Myrica arctogale
- †Mytilon – type locality for genus
  - †Mytilon theresae – type locality for species
- Mytilus
  - †Mytilus coalingensis
  - †Mytilus edulis
  - †Mytilus gratacapi
  - †Mytilus middendorffi
  - †Mytilus pholadis

== N ==
- Namunaria
- Natica
  - †Natica janthostoma
  - †Natica oregonensis
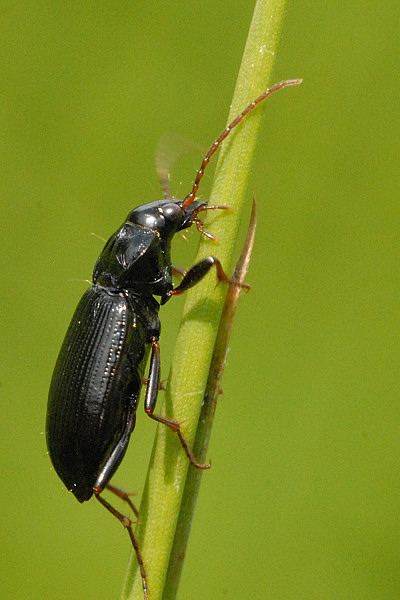
- A living Nebria ground beetle
  Nebria
- †Neilo
  - †Neilo gryci – type locality for species
- Nemocardium
  - †Nemocardium exoense
- Neoconorbina
  - †Neoconorbina tabernacularis
- Neopilumnoplax
  - †Neopilumnoplax hannibalanus
- Neptunea
  - †Neptunea elatior – or unidentified comparable form
  - †Neptunea heros
  - †Neptunea leffingwelli
  - †Neptunea lyrata
  - †Neptunea modesta – or unidentified related form
  - †Neptunea plafkeri
  - †Neptunea tabulata – or unidentified comparable form
  - †Neptunea ventricosa
- Neverita
  - †Neverita washingtonensis
- Notiophilus
  - †Notiophilus aeneus – or unidentified comparable form
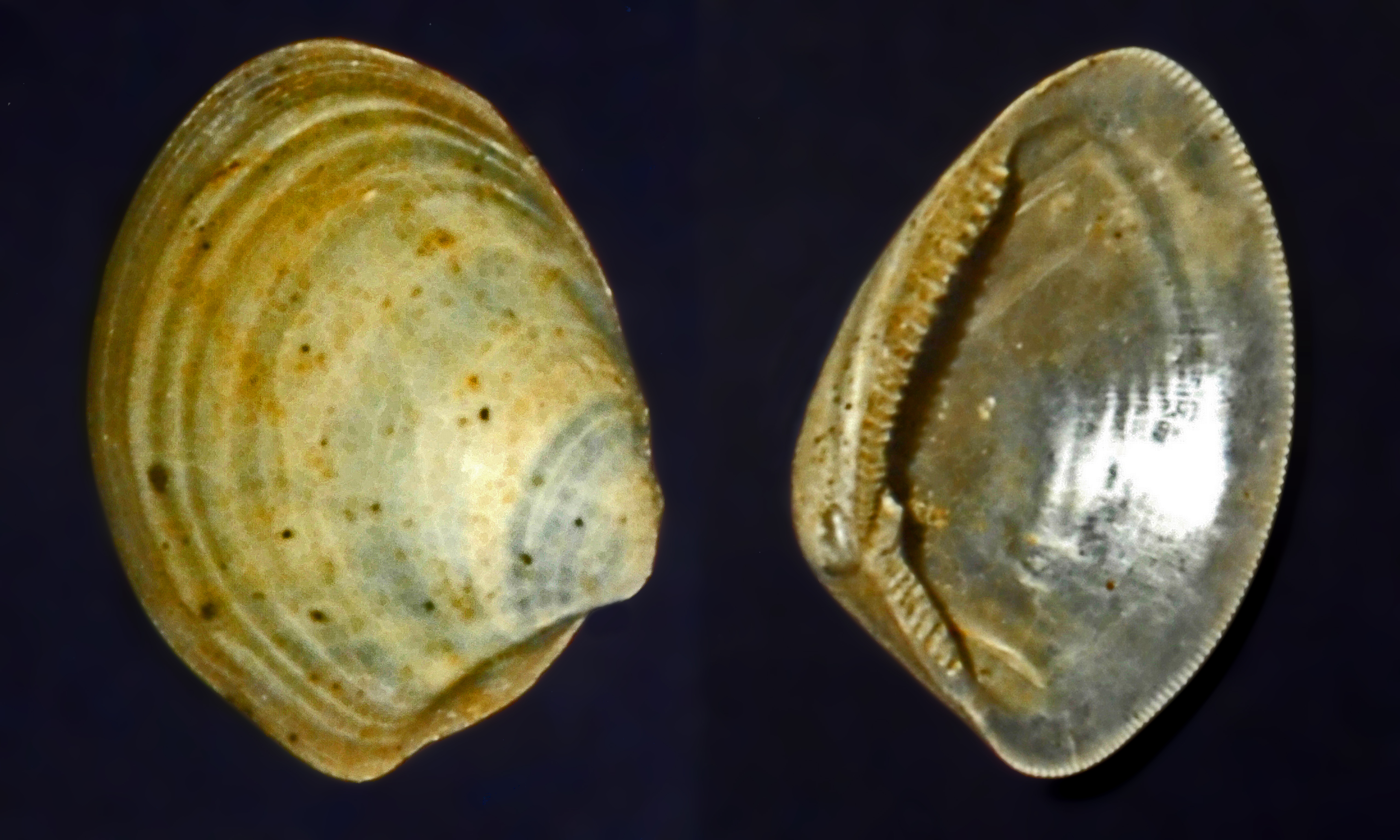
- Interior of a fossilized shell of the Early Ordovician-modern marine bivalve Nucula
  Nucula
  - †Nucula micheleae – type locality for species
- Nuculana
  - †Nuculana fossa
  - †Nuculana moriyai – type locality for species
  - †Nuculana morrisi

== O ==
- Ochotona
  - †Ochotona whartoni
- Odobenus
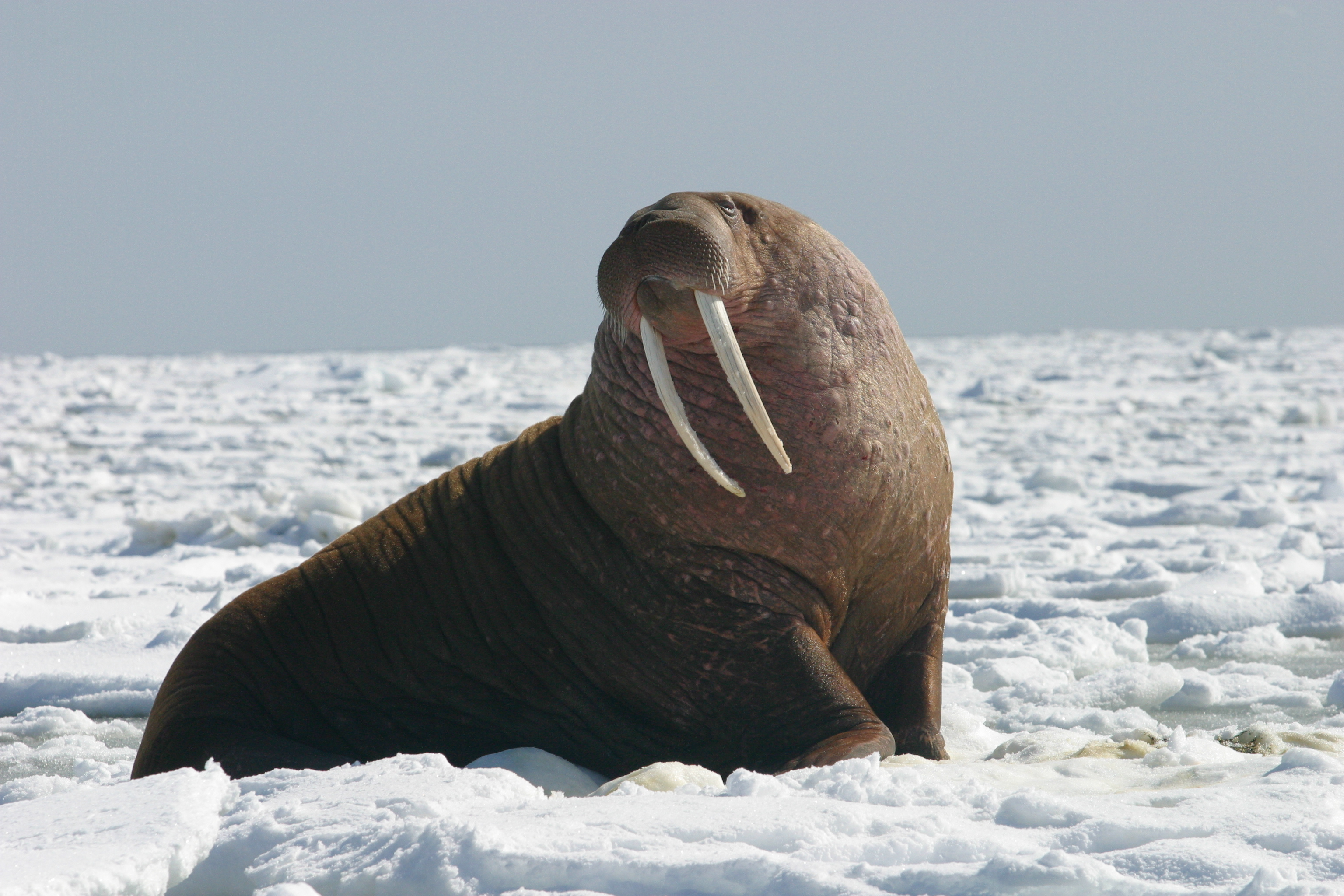
  - A living Odobenus rosmarus, or walrus
    †Odobenus rosmarus
- Oenopota
  - †Oenopota candida
  - †Oenopota laevigata
- Oolina
  - †Oolina borealis
- †Orbitoplax – type locality for genus
  - †Orbitoplax plafkeri – type locality for species
- Oribatella – tentative report
- †Orodaphne
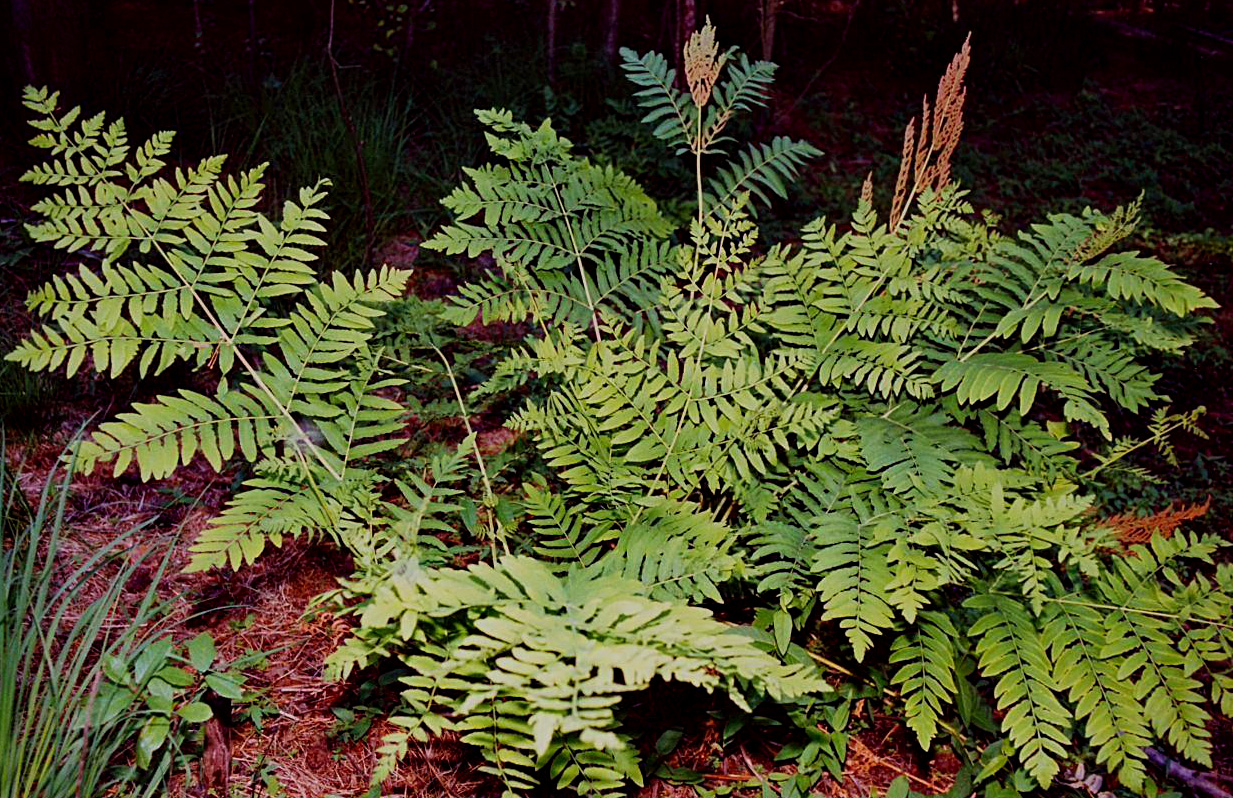
- Living Osmunda ferns
  †Osmunda
  - †Osmunda doroschkiana
- Ostrea
  - †Ostrea lincolnensis – or unidentified related form
  - †Ostrea tigiliana
  - †Ostrea trigiliana – or unidentified comparable form
- †Ounalashkastylus – type locality for genus
  - †Ounalashkastylus tomidai – type locality for species
- Ovibos
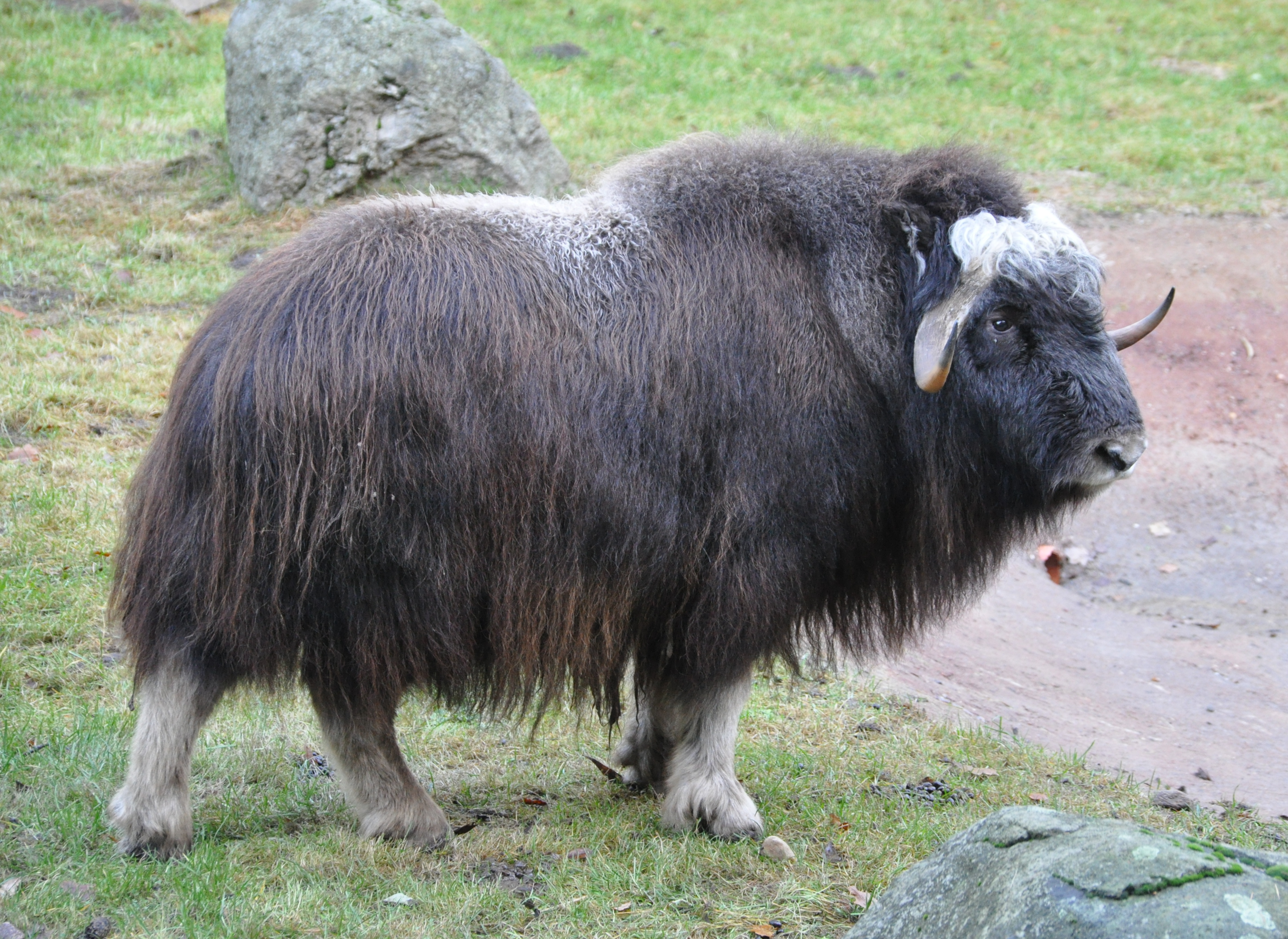
  - A living Ovibos moschatus, or muskox
    †Ovibos moschatus
- Ovis
  - †Ovis dalli – tentative report
- †Oxytoma
  - †Oxytoma hargrovei – type locality for species

== P ==
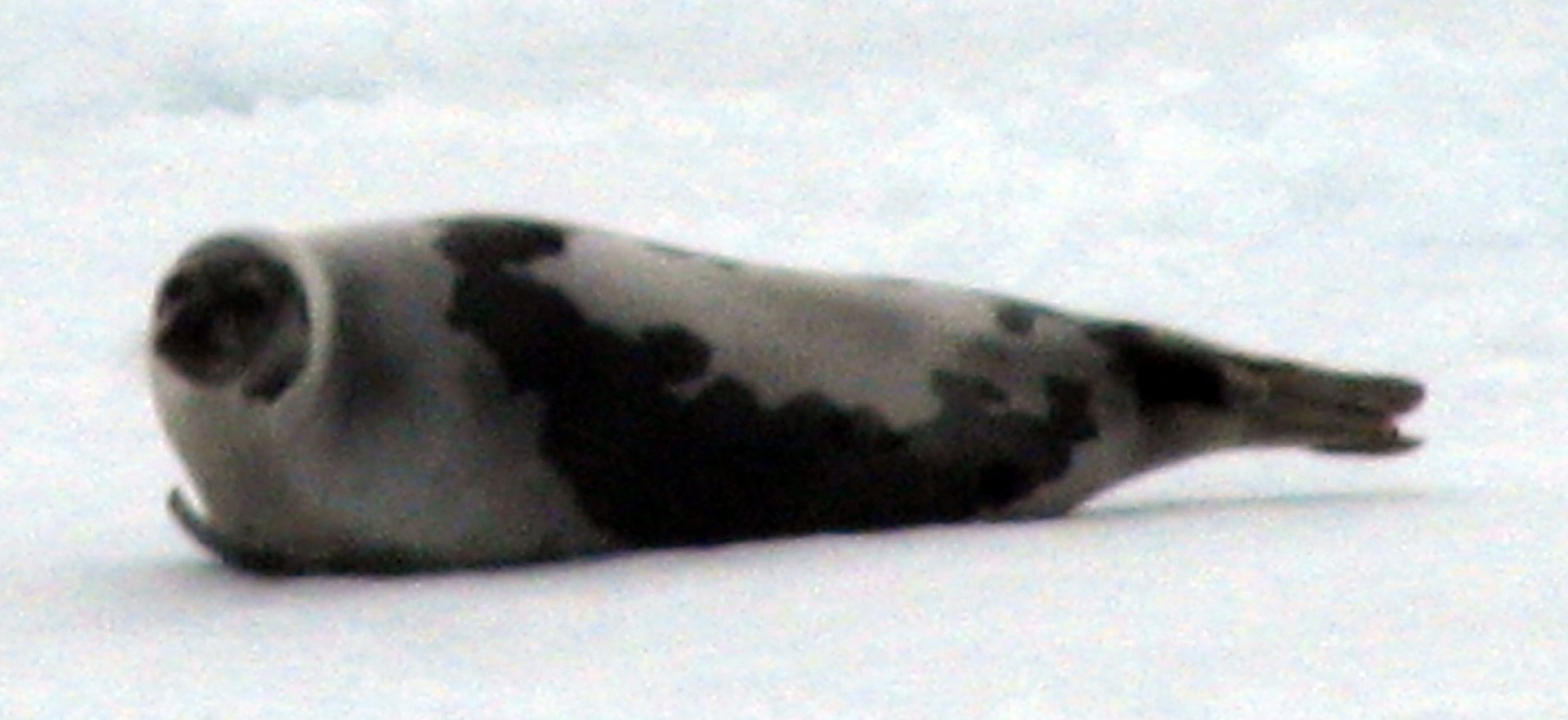
- A living Pagophilus groenlandicus, or harp seal
  Pagophilus
  - †Pagophilus groenlandica
- Palliolum
  - †Palliolum groenlandicum
- Pandora
  - †Pandora wardiana
- Panomya
  - †Panomya ampla
  - †Panomya izumo
  - †Panomya trapezoidis
- Papyridea
  - †Papyridea harrimani
- Parapholas – tentative report
  - †Parapholas california
- †Parasyrinx
- Patrobus
  - †Patrobus septentrionis – or unidentified comparable form
- Penitella
- Periploma
  - †Periploma aleutica
  - †Periploma besshoense
  - †Periploma fragilis – or unidentified related form
- †Perse
- Phenacomys
  - †Phenacomys deeringensis
- Phoca
  - †Phoca hispida
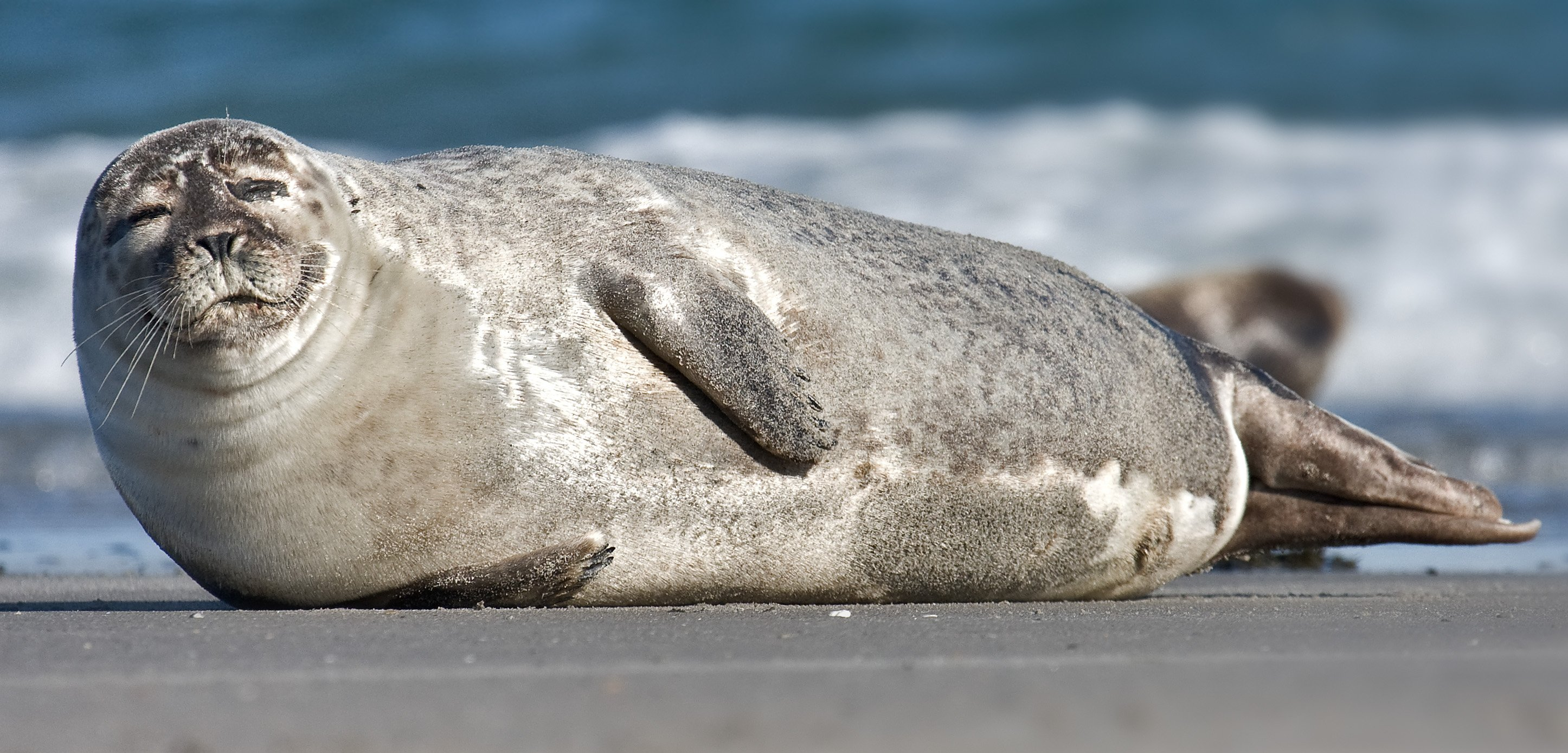
  - A living Phoca vitulina, or harbor seal
    †Phoca vitulina
- Picea
  - †Picea glauca
  - †Picea mariana
  - †Picea sitchensis – or unidentified comparable form
- Pinus
  - †Pinus monticola
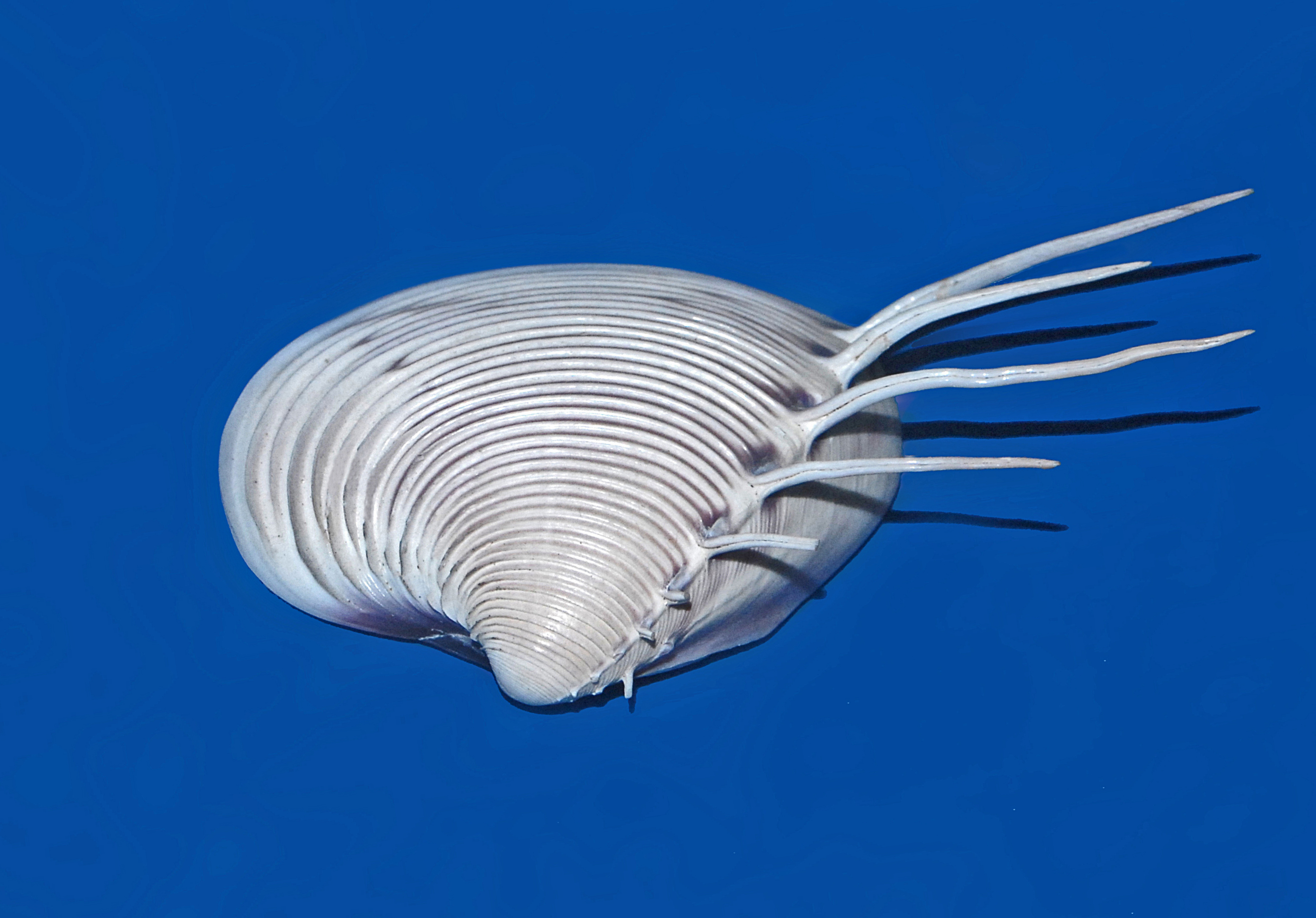
- Shell of a Pitar venus clam
  Pitar
  - †Pitar angustifrons
  - †Pitar avenalensis – or unidentified comparable form
  - †Pitar dalli – or unidentified related form
- †Placunopsis
  - †Placunopsis rothi – type locality for species
- †Planera
  - †Planera ungeri
- Planulina
  - †Planulina alaskensis
- Plicifusus
  - †Plicifusus kroyeri – or unidentified related form
- Pododesmus
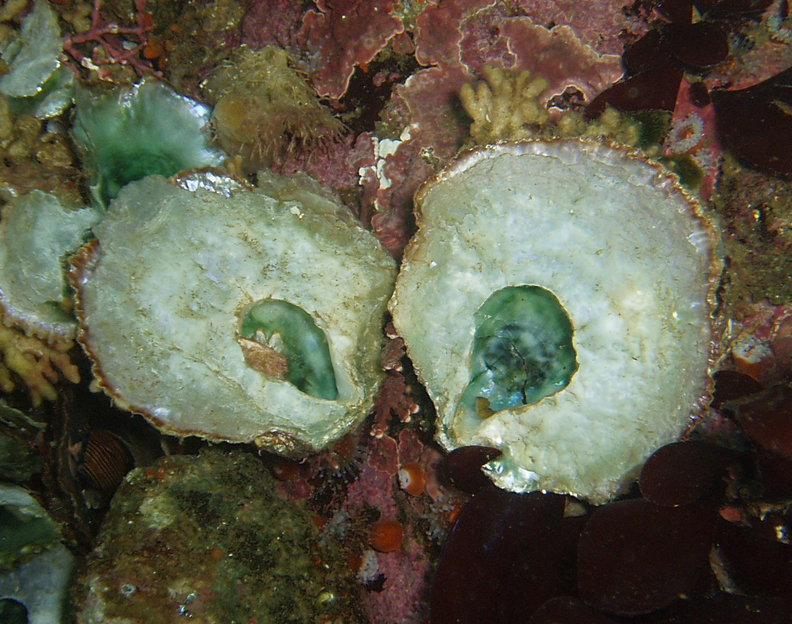
  - Two living Pododesmus macrochisma or Alaska jingles
    †Pododesmus macrochisma
- Polinices
  - †Polinices diabloensis
  - †Polinices lincolnensis – or unidentified comparable form
  - †Polinices pallidus
  - †Polinices ramonensis
  - †Polinices repenningi – type locality for species
- Polymorphina
  - †Polymorphina kincaidi
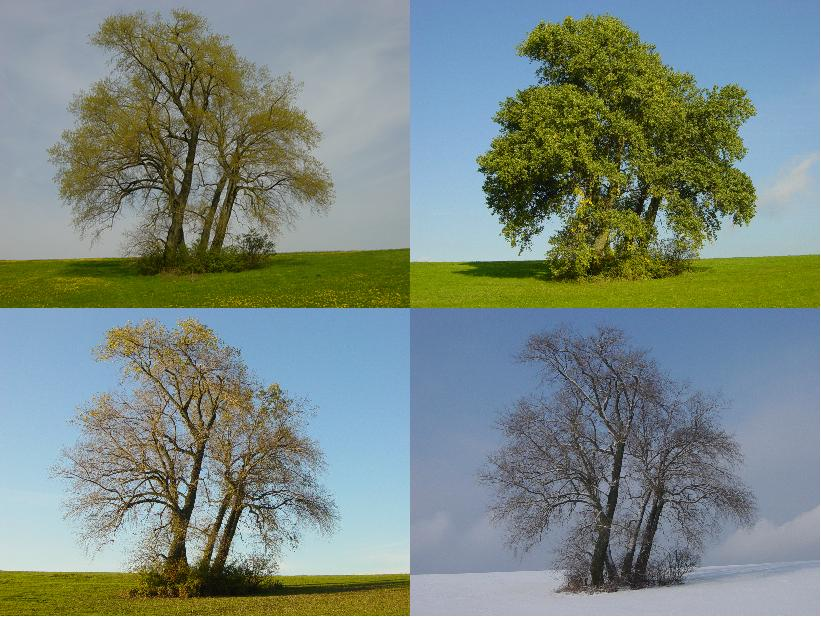
- Montage of photographs in spring (top left), summer (top right), autumn (bottom left), and winter (bottom right) of Populus, or poplar tree
  Populus
  - †Populus balsamoides
  - †Populus glandulifera
- Portlandia
  - †Portlandia ovata
  - †Portlandia watasei
- †Portunites
  - †Portunites alaskensis
- †Praeovibos
- †Predicrostonyx
  - †Predicrostonyx hopkinsi
- †Priscofusus
  - †Priscofusus clarki
  - †Priscofusus stewarti – or unidentified related form
- †Protocardia – tentative report
- †Protochelydra
  - †Protochelydra zangerli – or unidentified comparable form
- Protothaca
  - †Protothaca staleyi
- Pseudarchaster
- Pteris
  - †Pteris sitkensis
- Pterostichus
  - †Pterostichus corvinus – or unidentified comparable form
  - †Pterostichus vermiculosus – or unidentified comparable form
- Puncturella
  - †Puncturella longifissa
- Purpura
  - †Purpura crispata – or unidentified related form
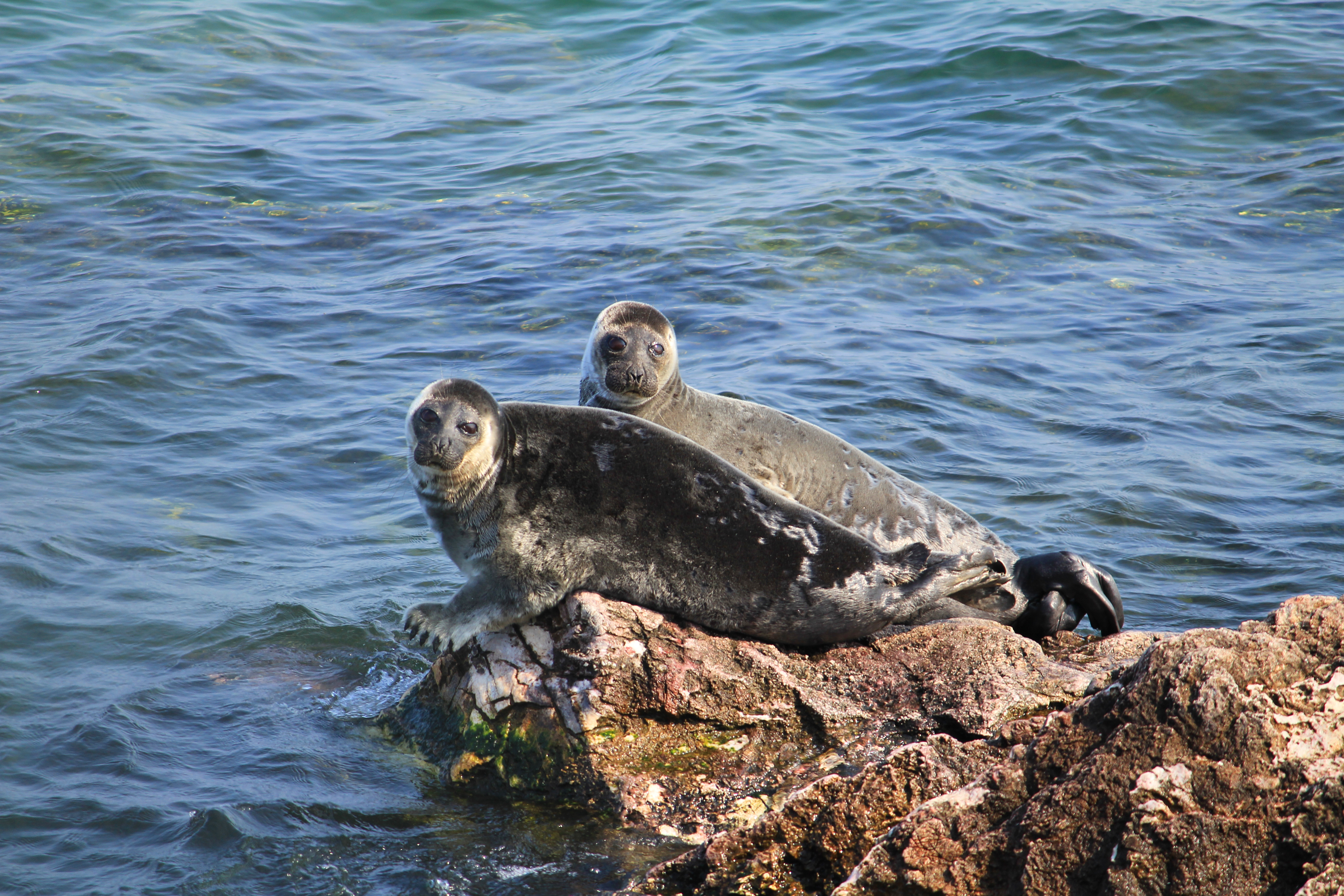
- A living Pusa earless seal
  Pusa – or unidentified related form
  - †Pusa hispida
- Pyrgo
  - †Pyrgo elongata – or unidentified comparable form
- Pyrulofusus
  - †Pyrulofusus schraderi

== Q ==
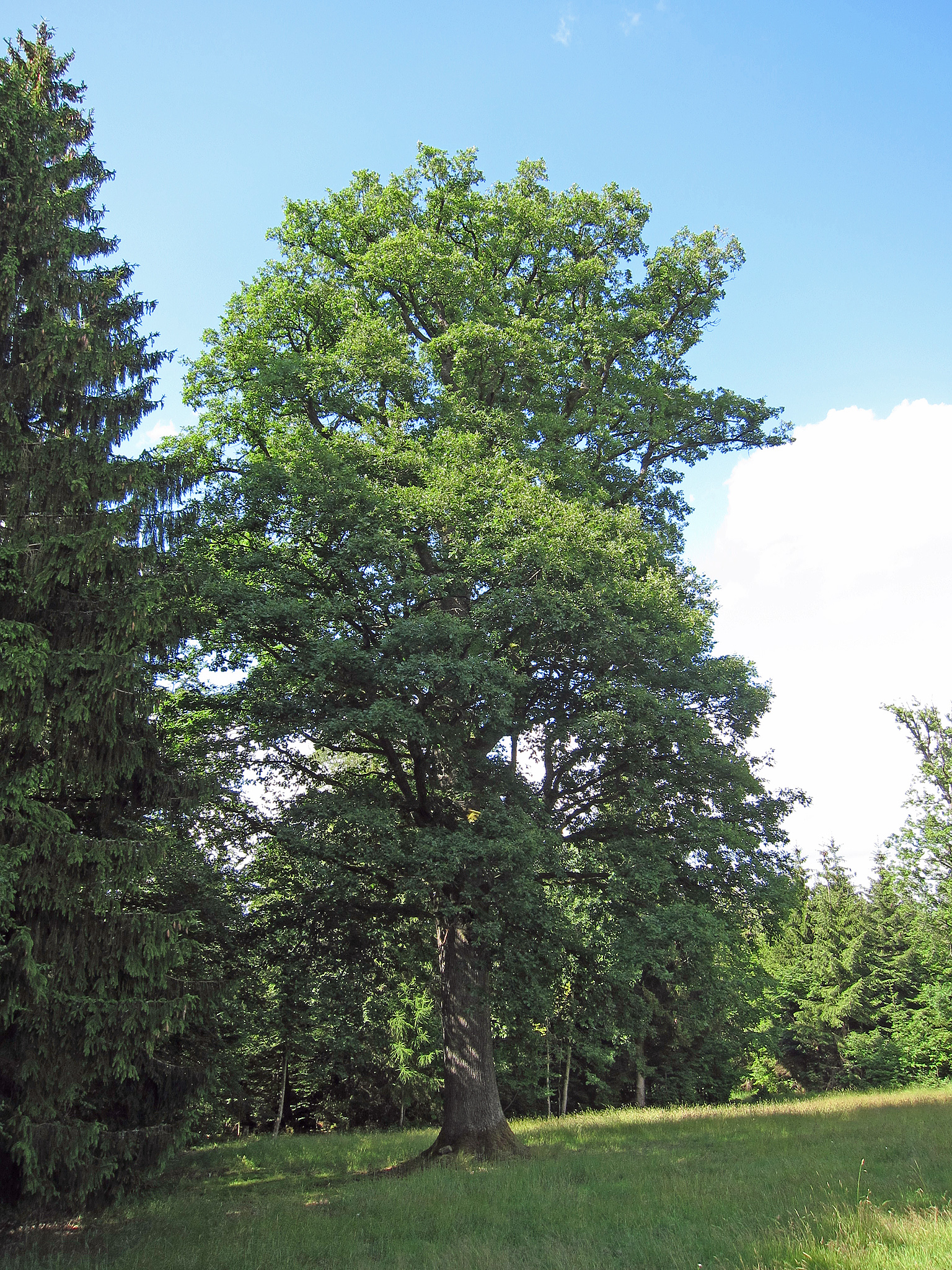
- A living Quercus, or oak tree
  Quercus
- Quinqueloculina
  - †Quinqueloculina agglutinata
  - †Quinqueloculina akneriana
  - †Quinqueloculina seminulum

== R ==
- Rangifer
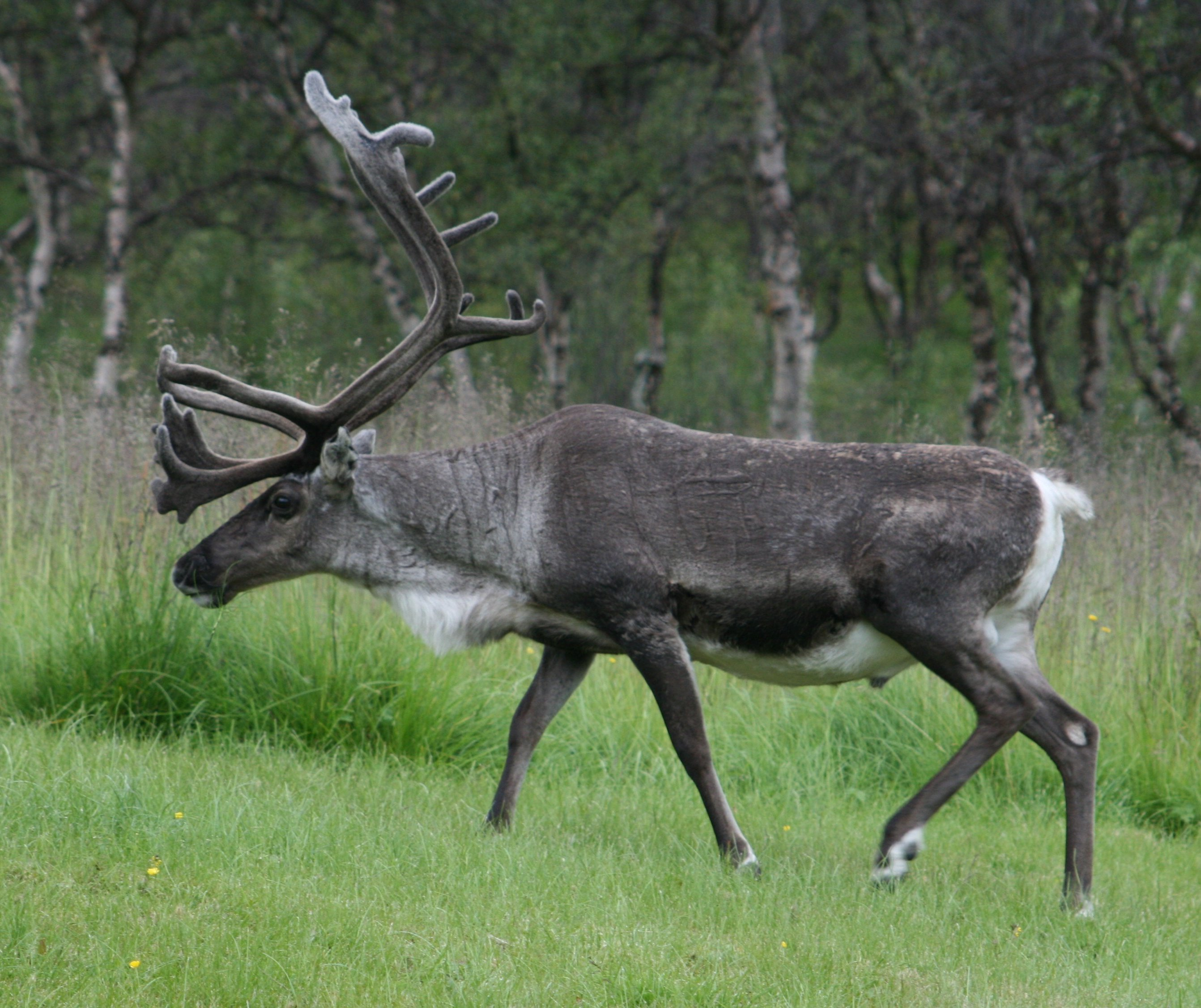
  - A living Rangifer tarandus, or reindeer
    †Rangifer tarandus
- Raninoides
  - †Raninoides vaderensis
- Rhabdus
  - †Rhabdus schencki – or unidentified comparable form
- Rosalina
  - †Rosalina wrightii
- †Rotalia
  - †Rotalia columbiensis

== S ==
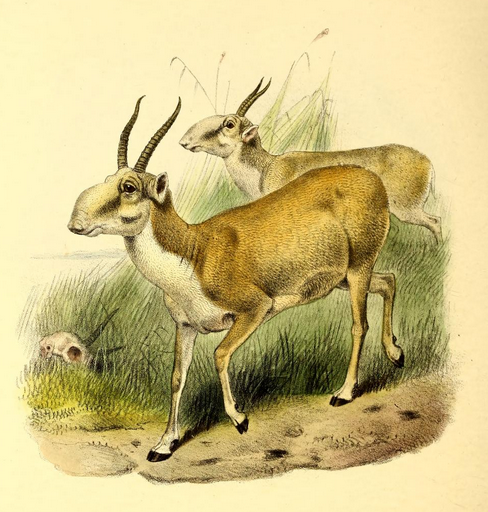
- Illustration of two Saiga tatarica antelopes
  Saiga
- Saxidomus
  - †Saxidomus callistaeformis – or unidentified comparable form
  - †Saxidomus hanzawai
- Scaphander
  - †Scaphander lignarius – or unidentified comparable form
- †Scutella
  - †Scutella gabbi
- Sequoia
  - †Sequoia couttsiae – tentative report
  - †Sequoia langsdorfii
  - †Sequoia nordenskioldi – tentative report
- Serripes
  - †Serripes groenlandicus
  - †Serripes hamiltonensis
  - †Serripes laperousii
- †Shedocardia – tentative report
- Siliqua
  - †Siliqua alta – or unidentified comparable form
- Similipecten
  - †Similipecten greenlandicus
- Simplocaria
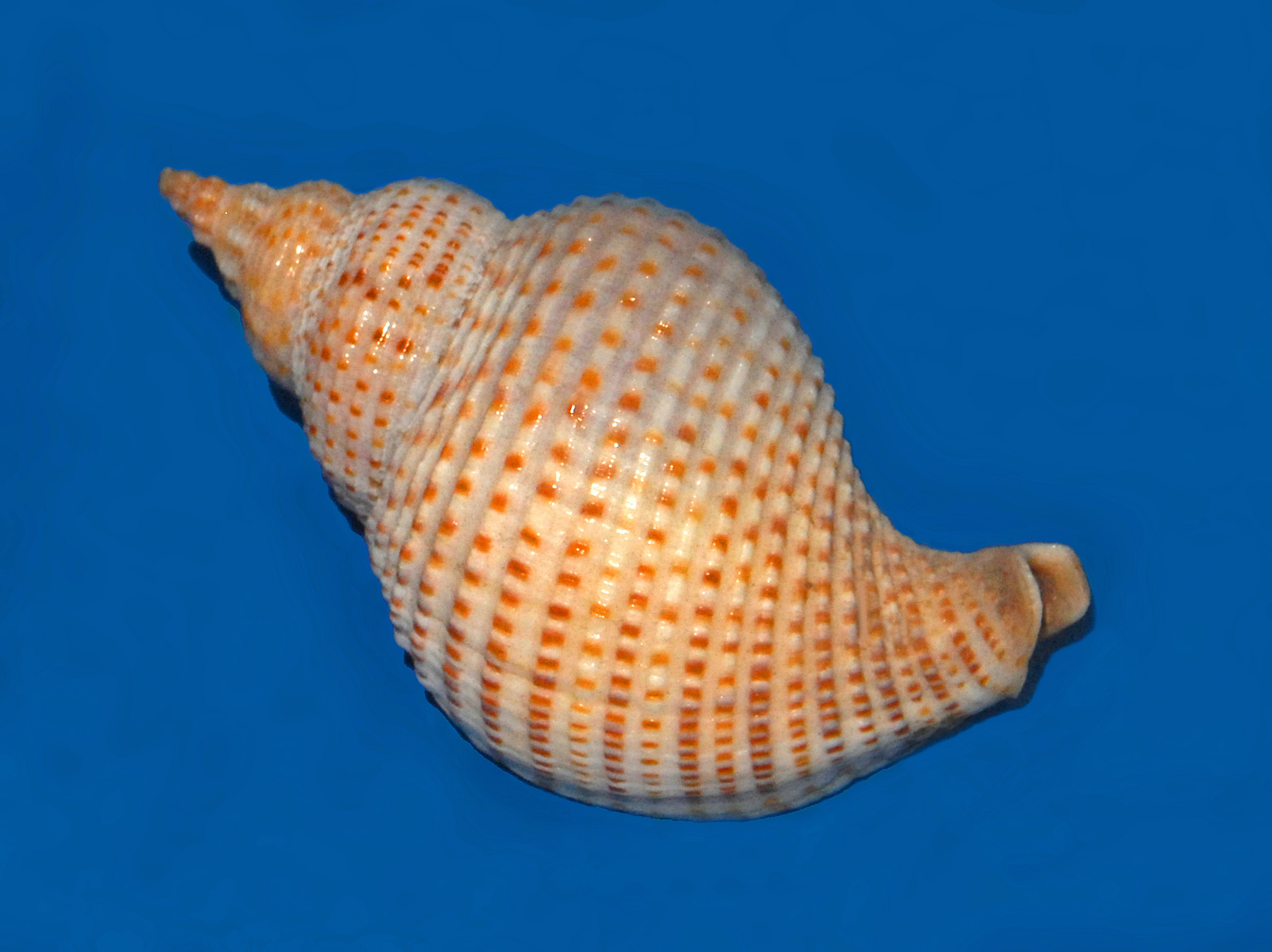
- Shell of the whelk sea snail Siphonalia
  Siphonalia
  - †Siphonalia sakakurai – or unidentified related form
- †Skeneopsis
  - †Skeneopsis alaskana
- Solamen
  - †Solamen leana
- Solena
- Sorex
- Spermophilus
  - †Spermophilus undulatus
- Spirorbis
- Spirotropis
  - †Spirotropis perversa – or unidentified comparable form
- Spisula
  - †Spisula addicotti
  - †Spisula callistaeformis
  - †Spisula eugenense – or unidentified related form
  - †Spisula hannibali – or unidentified comparable form
- Stenus
- †Streptochetus – tentative report
- Strongylocentrotus
  - †Strongylocentrotus droebachiensis
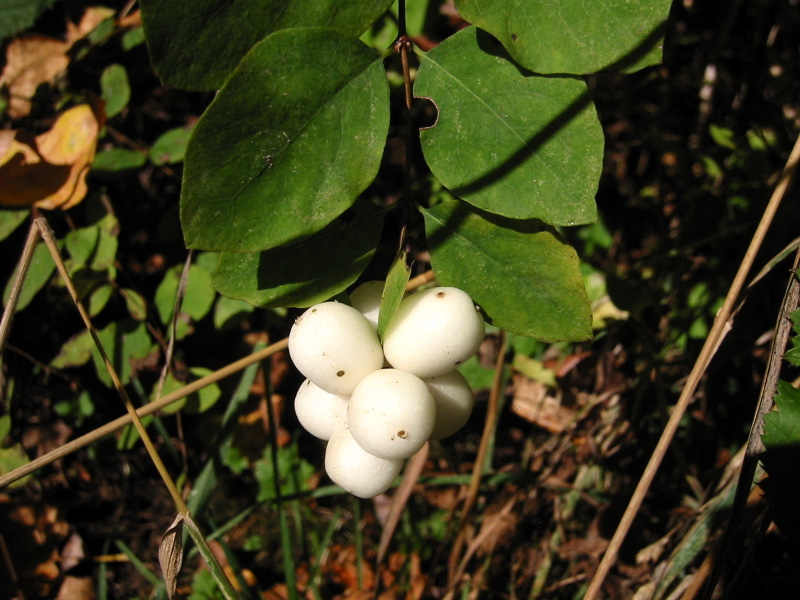
- Branch with fruit of a Symphoricarpos, or snowberry shrub
  †Symphoricarpos

== T ==
- Tachinus
  - †Tachinus apertus – or unidentified comparable form
- Tachyrhynchus
  - †Tachyrhynchus erosus
- †Tancredia
  - †Tancredia slavichi – type locality for species
- †Taxites
  - †Taxites olriki
- Taxodium
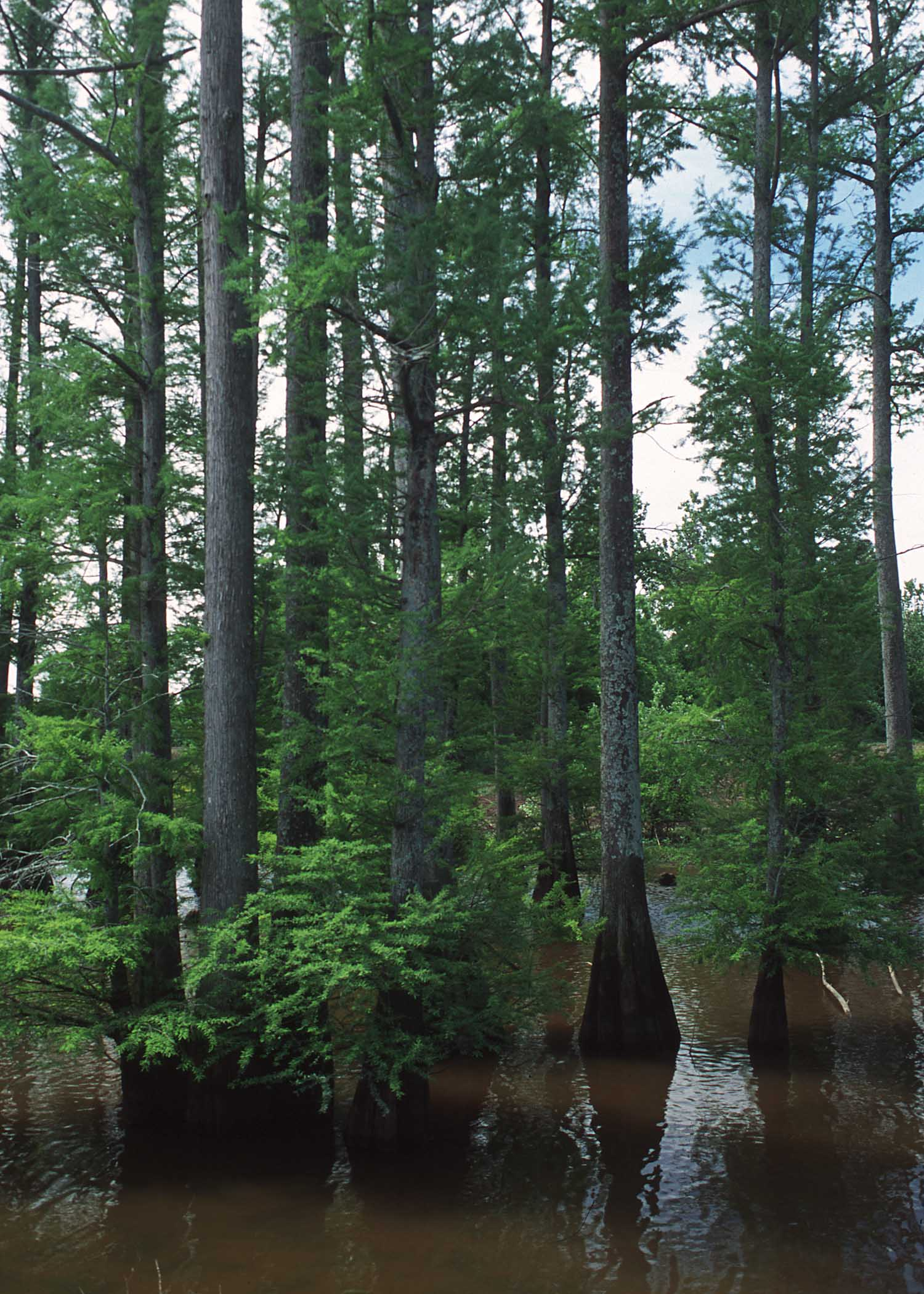
  - Living Taxodium distichum, or bald cypresses
    †Taxodium distichum
  - †Taxodium dubium
  - †Taxodium occidentale
  - †Taxodium tinajorum
- Tellina
  - †Tellina aragonia
- †Tellinimera
  - †Tellinimera kauffmani – type locality for species
- Terebratula
  - †Terebratula retusa – or unidentified related form
- Terebratulina
  - †Terebratulina retusa – or unidentified related form
- Thracia
  - †Thracia condoni
  - †Thracia septentrionalis – or unidentified related form
- Thyasira
  - †Thyasira arctica
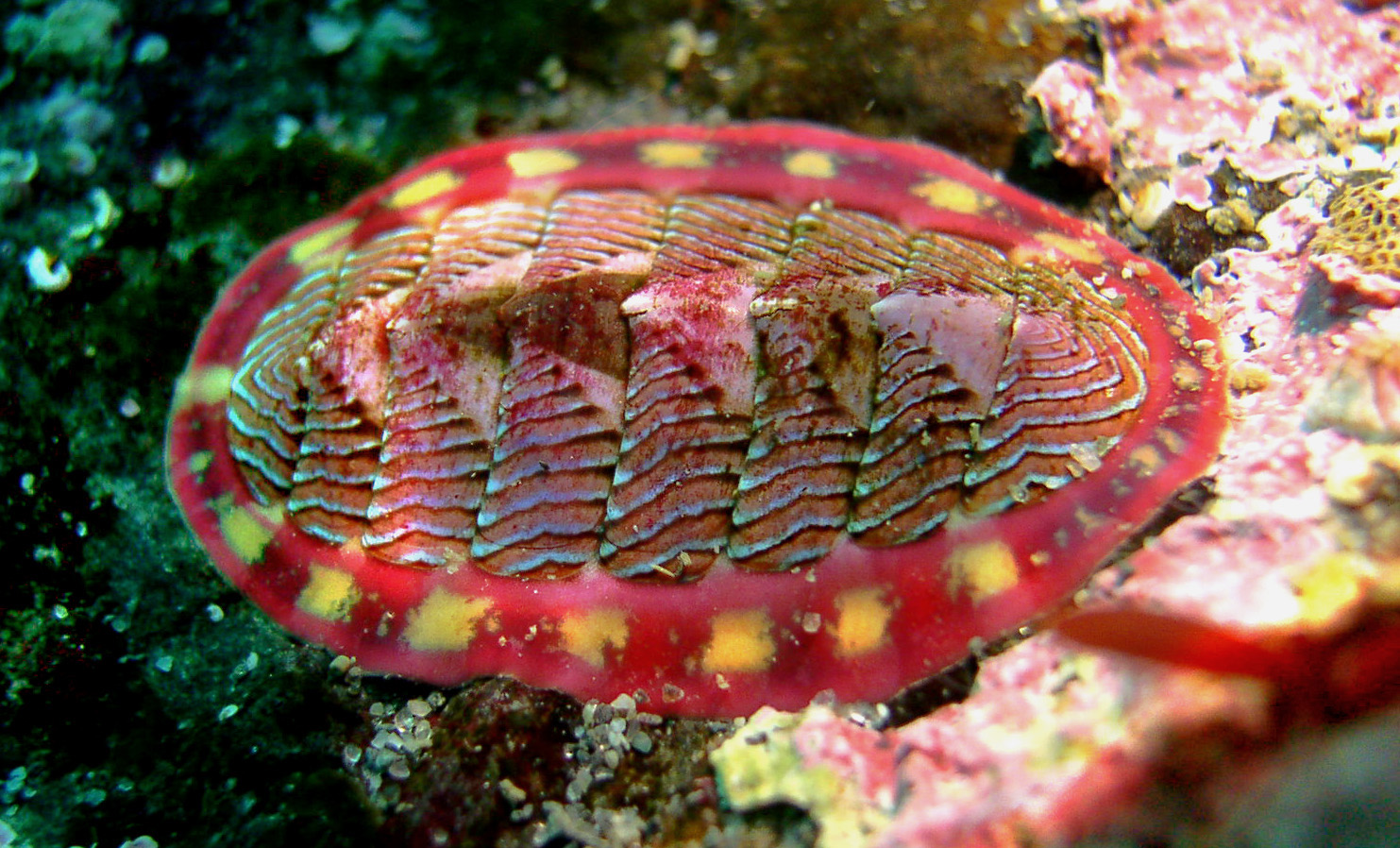
- A living Tonicella, or lined chiton
  Tonicella
  - †Tonicella marmorea
- †Trichohyalis
  - †Trichohyalis ornatissima
- Trichotropis
  - †Trichotropis bicarinata
- †Triloculine
  - †Triloculine trigonula
- †Tsuga
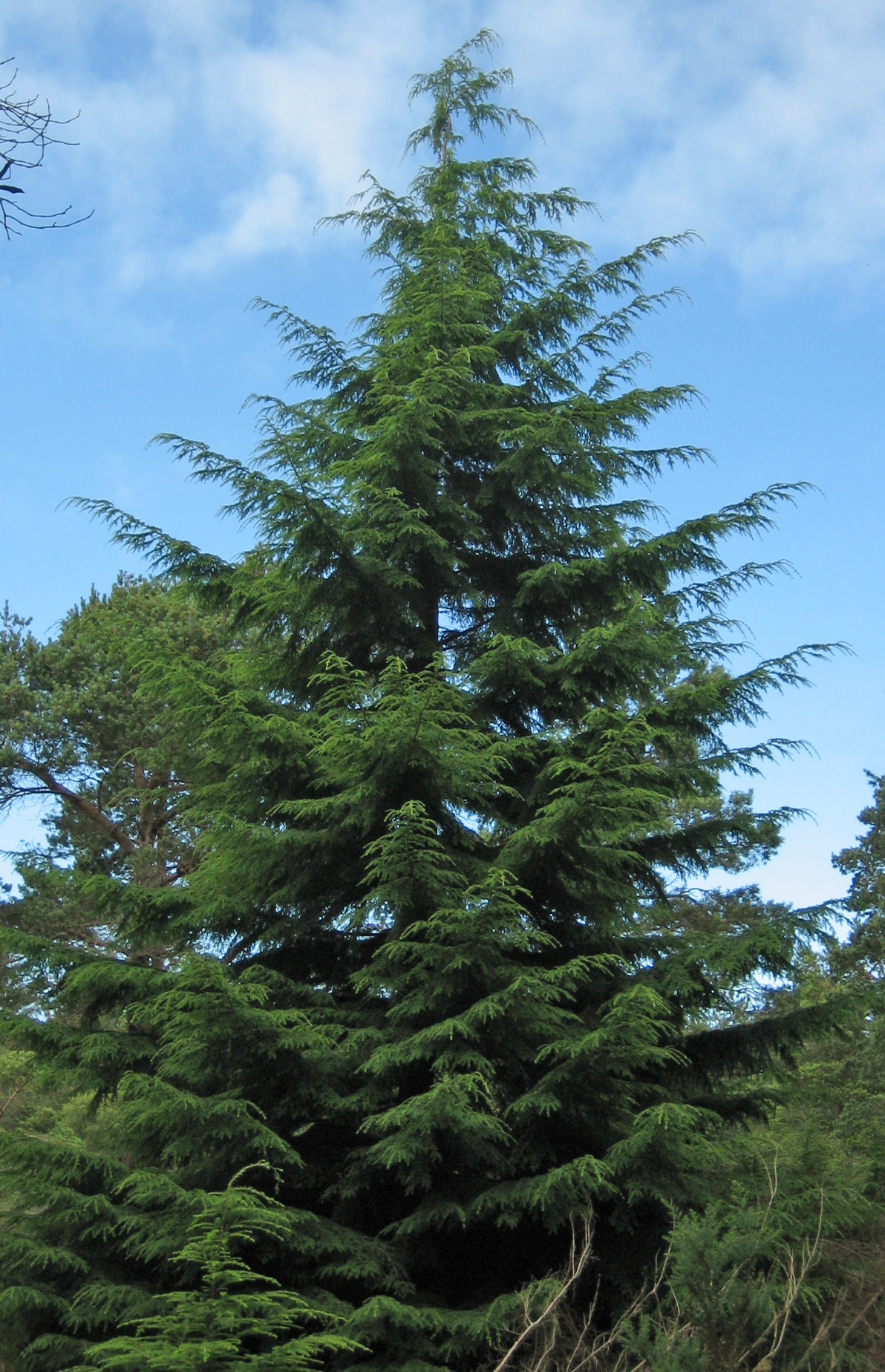
  - A living Tsuga heterophylla, or western hemlock
    †Tsuga heterophylla
- Turritella
  - †Turritella uvasana
- Turtonia
  - †Turtonia minuta
- †Tymolus
  - †Tymolus alaskensis – type locality for species
- †Tyrannoberingius
  - †Tyrannoberingius rex
- †Tyrranoberingius
  - †Tyrranoberingius rex

== U ==
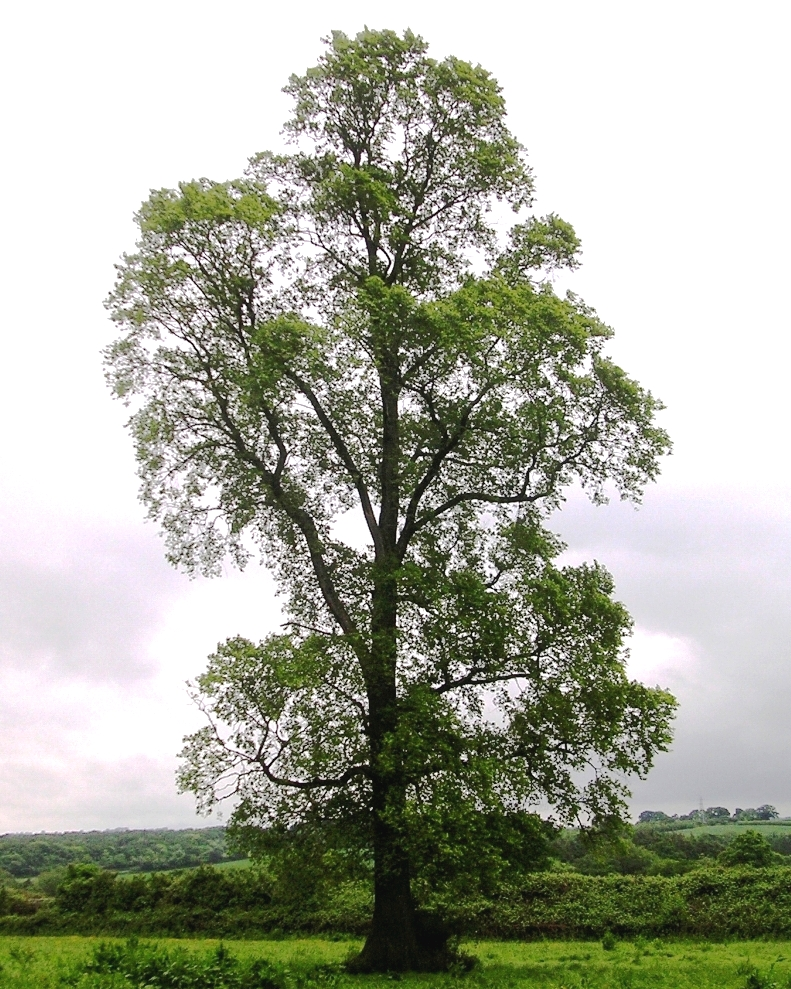
- A living Ulmus, or elm
  Ulmus
- Ursus
- †Uya
  - †Uya arenaria – or unidentified related form

== V ==
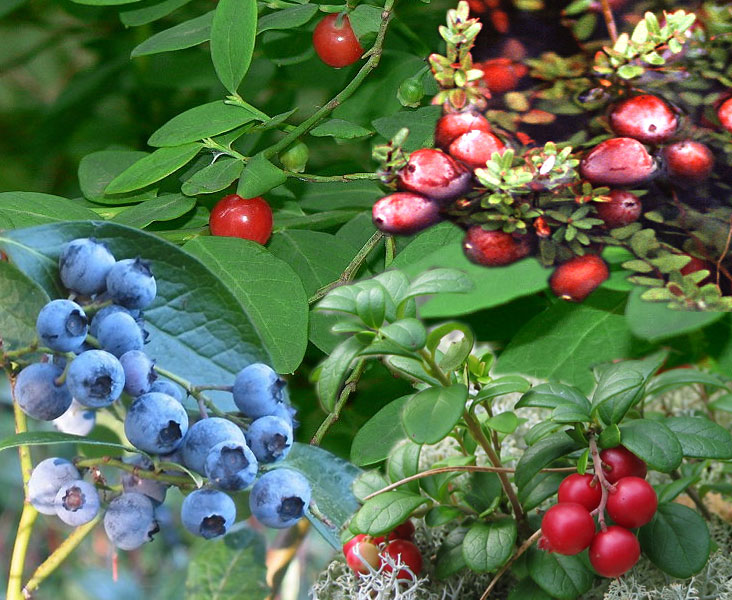
- A variety of modern Vaccinium species, clockwise from top right: cranberries, lingonberries, blueberries, and huckleberries
  †Vaccinium
- Venericardia
  - †Venericardia clarki – or unidentified related form
- Veraphis – tentative report
- †Vertipecten
- Vitavitus
  - †Vitavitus thulius – or unidentified comparable form
- Vitis
  - †Vitis olriki
- Volutopsius
  - †Volutopsius stefanssoni – or unidentified related form
- Vulpes
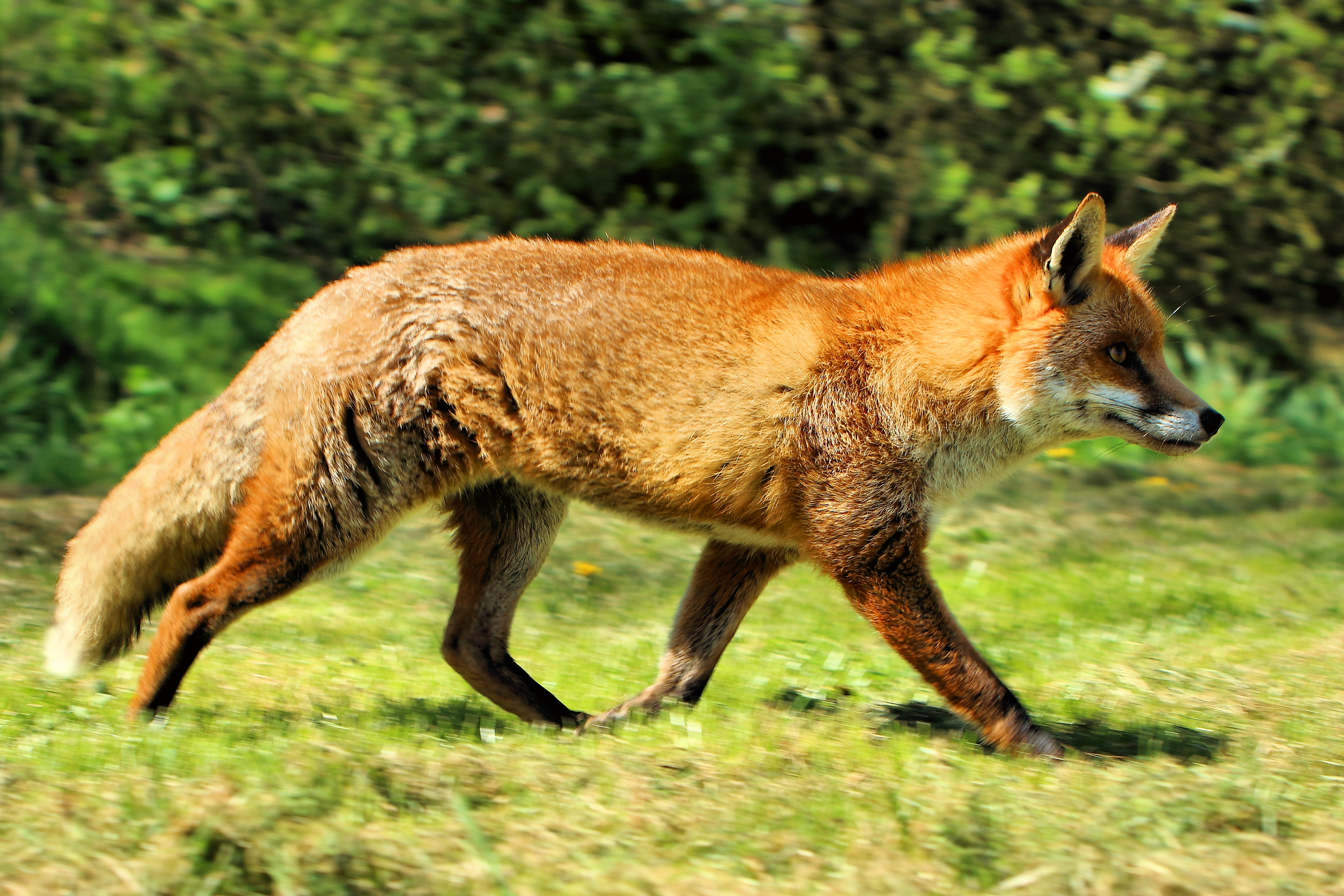
  - A living Vulpes vulpes, or red fox
    †Vulpes vulpes

== X ==
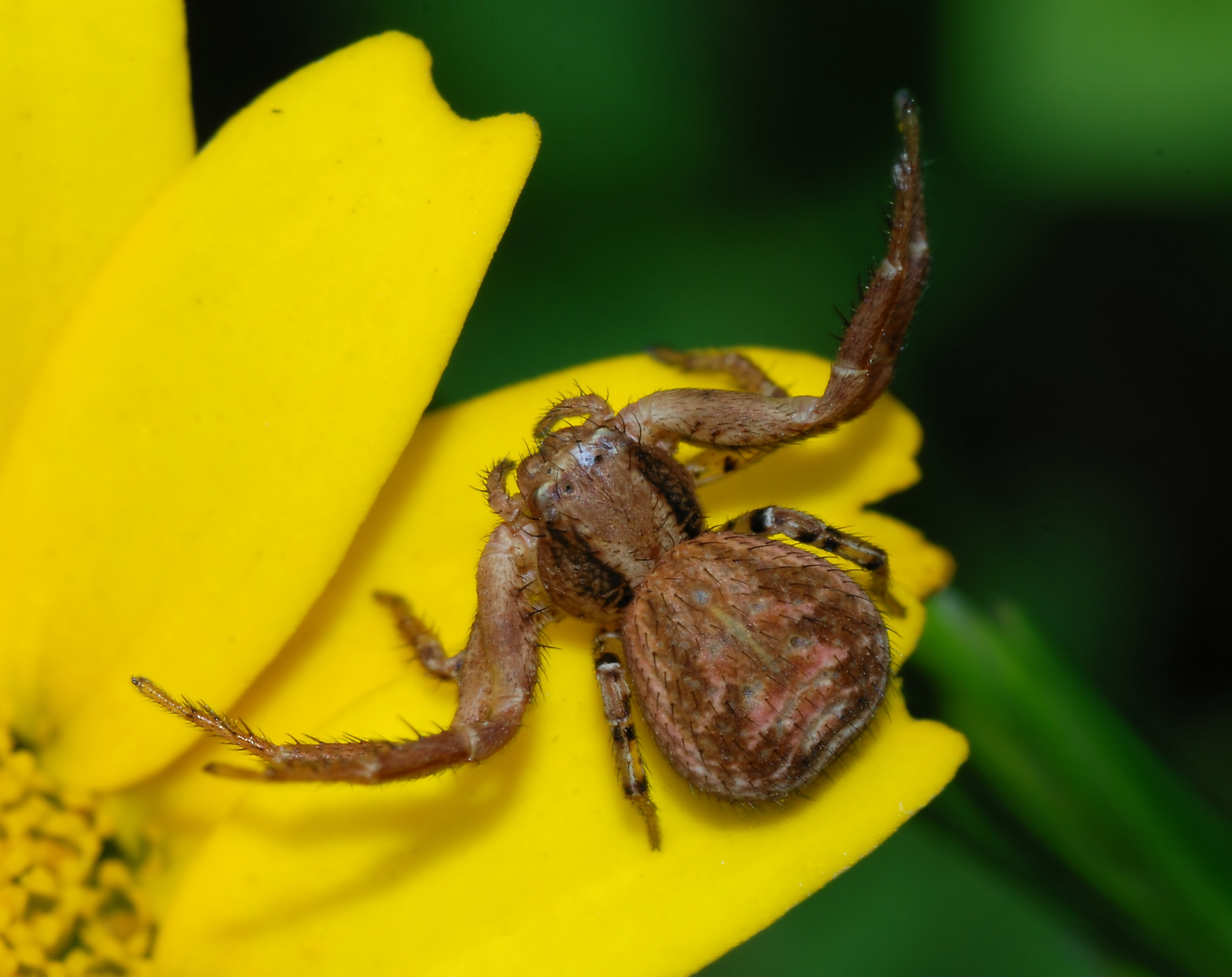
- A living Xysticus crab spider
  Xysticus
  - †Xysticus archaeopalpus – type locality for species

== Y ==
- Yoldia
  - †Yoldia breweri – or unidentified comparable form
  - †Yoldia emersoni – or unidentified comparable form
  - †Yoldia gladenkovi – type locality for species
  - †Yoldia palachei – or unidentified comparable form
  - †Yoldia scissurata
  - †Yoldia sobrina
- Yoldiella
  - †Yoldiella scissurata
