= List of the prehistoric life of Maine =

This list of the prehistoric life of Maine contains the various prehistoric life-forms whose fossilized remains have been reported from within the US state of Maine.

== Precambrian ==
The Paleobiology Database records no known occurrences of Precambrian fossils in Maine.

== Paleozoic ==
- †Amphistrophonella
  - †Amphistrophonella funiculata – or unidentified comparable form
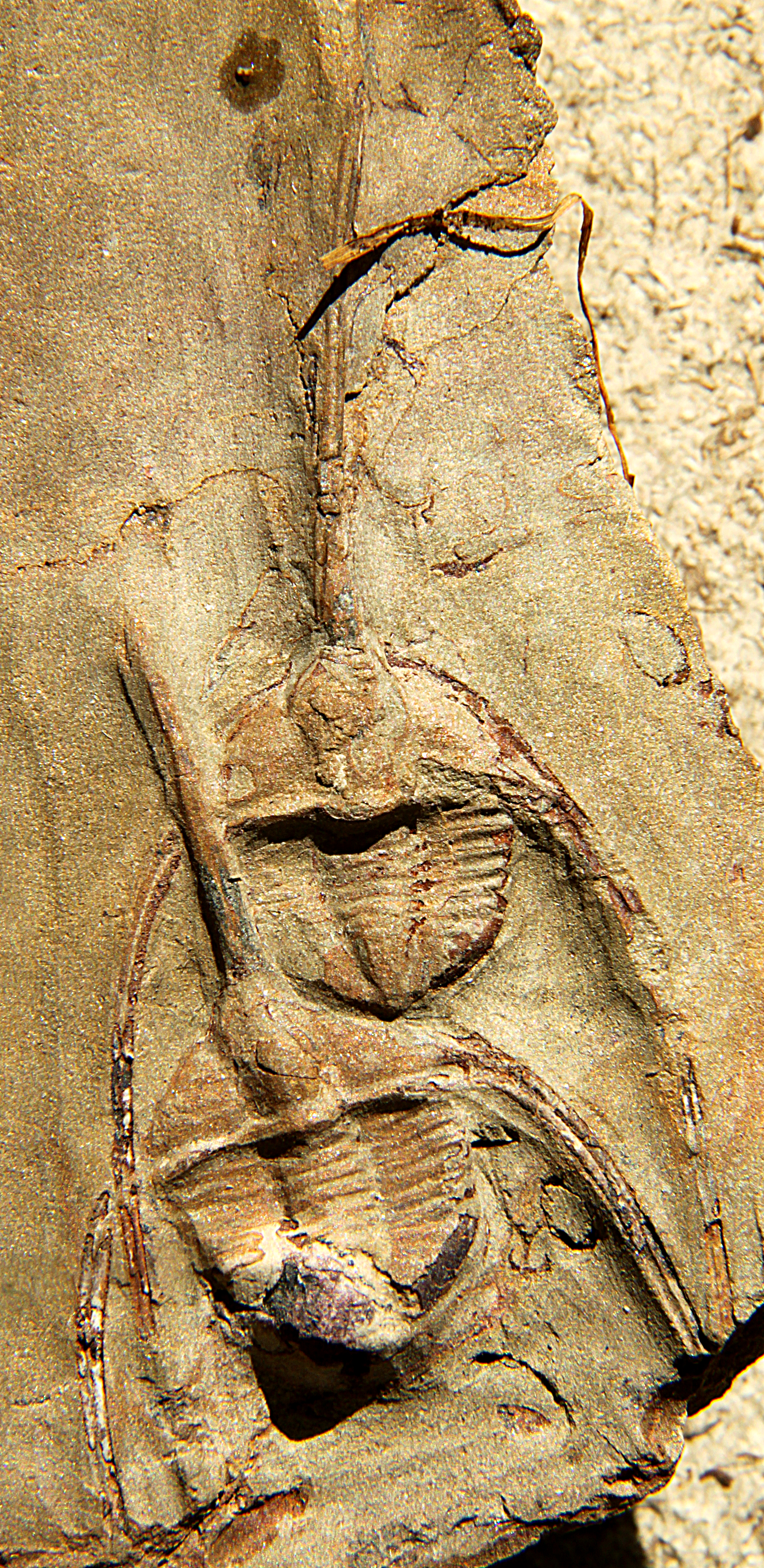
- Fossils of the Ordovician-Silurian trilobite Ampyx.
  †Ampyx
- †Annamitella – tentative report
  - †Annamitella borealis
- †Apiculiretusispora
- †Atrypa
  - †Atrypa reticularis
- †Barinophyton
  - †Barinophyton richardsoni
- †Barrandeina
  - †Barrandeina aroostookensis
- †Batostoma
- †Batostomella
- †Bucania – or unidentified comparable form
- †Cardiola
  - †Cardiola gibbosa
- †Cartericardia – tentative report
  - †Cartericardia dubia – type locality for species
- †Clivosisporites – or unidentified comparable form
  - †Clivosisporites verrucata
- †Crossoceras
  - †Crossoceras belandi
- †Cyrtia
- †Daidia
  - †Daidia wilsonae
- †Dalejina
- †Dalmanella
  - †Dalmanella testudinaria
- †Decorochilina
  - †Decorochilina beushauseni
- †Delerorthis
  - †Delerorthis flabellites
- †Delthyris
- †Deltoidospora
- †Dolerorthis
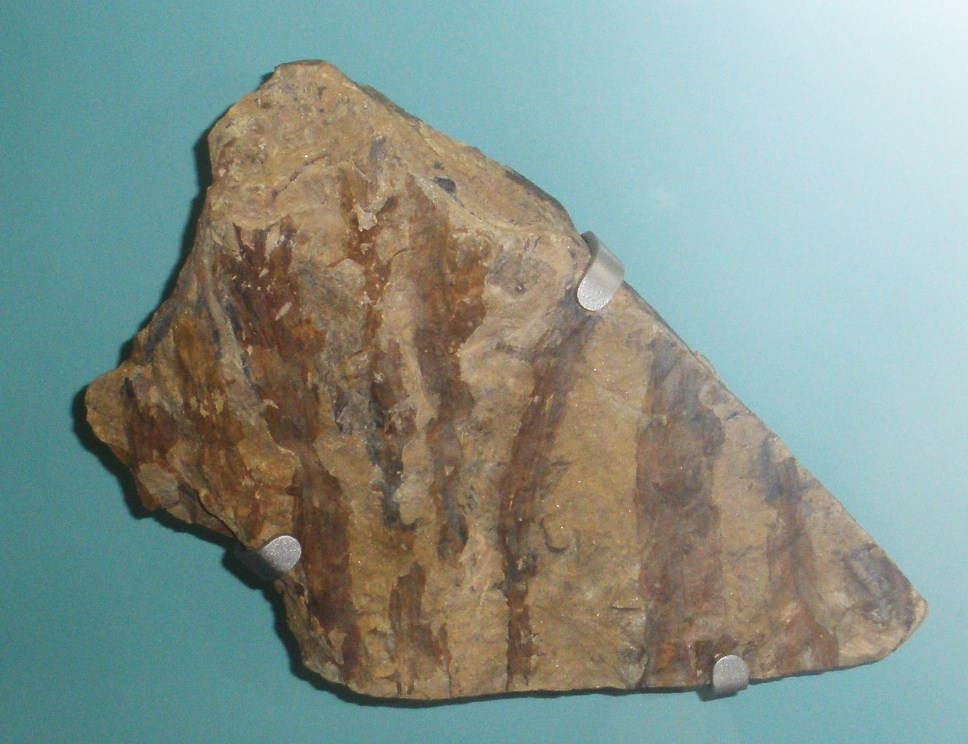
- Fossilized foliage from the Early-Late Devonian club moss relative Drepanophycus
  †Drepanophycus
- †Eccentricosta
- †Emphanisporites
  - †Emphanisporites annulatus
  - †Emphanisporites rotatus
- †Eocoelia
- †Eodinobolus
  - †Eodinobolus rotundus
- †Eohostimella – type locality for genus
  - †Eohostimella heathana – type locality for species
- †Eoplectodona – tentative report
- †Famatinorthis
  - †Famatinorthis turneri – or unidentified comparable form
- †Ferganella
- †Geragnostus
- †Goniostropha
  - †Goniostropha chapmani
- †Grandispora
- †Gypidula
- †Hibbertia – tentative report
- †Hostimella
- †Hystricoceras
  - †Hystricoceras hitchcocki
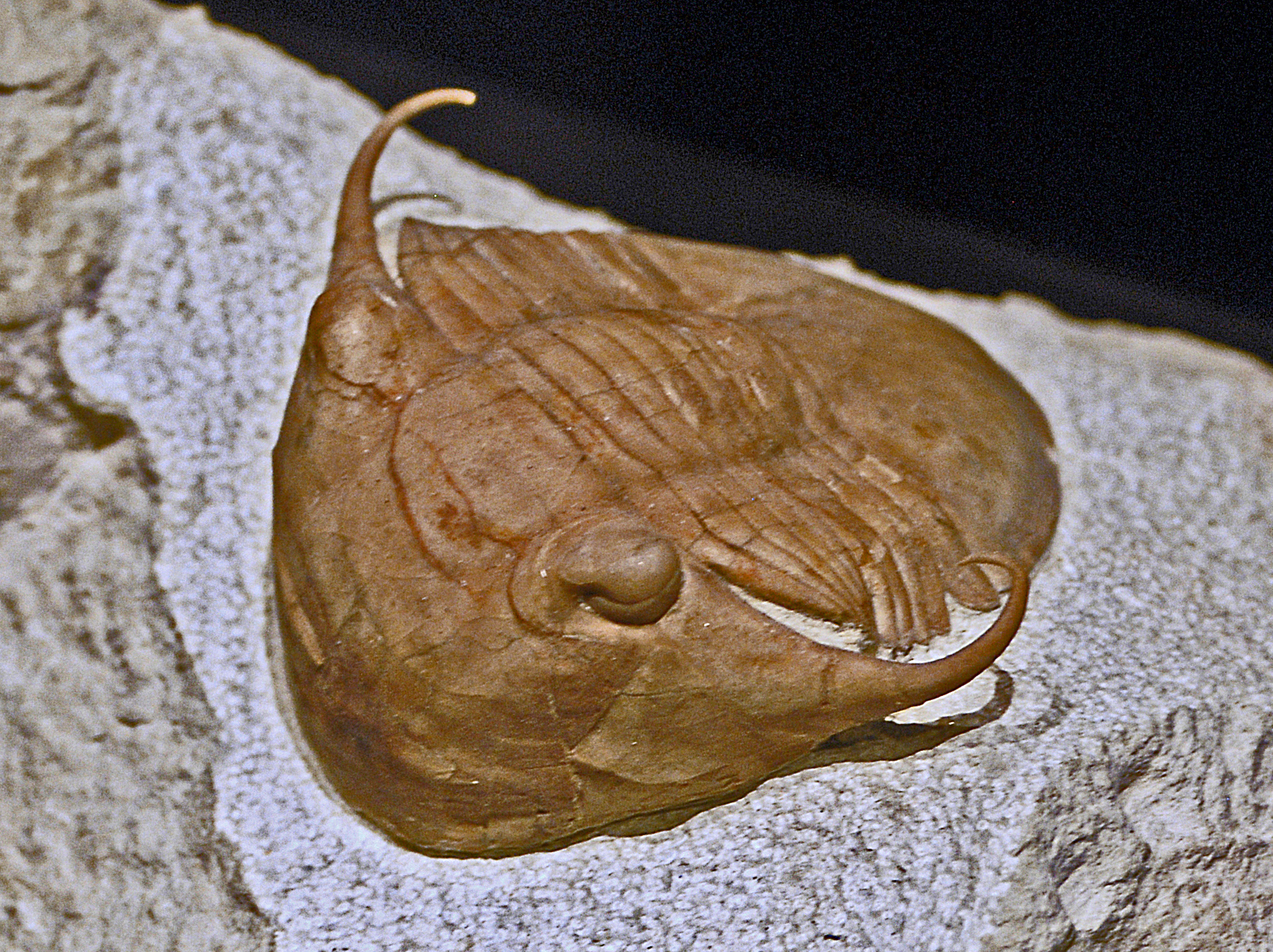
- Fossil of the Middle Ordovician trilobite Illaenus
  †Illaenus
- †Kaulangiophyton
  - †Kaulangiophyton akantha
- †Kolihadiscus
  - †Kolihadiscus somerseti – type locality for species
- †Leptaena
  - †Leptaena rhomboidalis
- †Lesueurilla – tentative report
- †Lophospira
  - †Lophospira milleri – or unidentified comparable form
- †Mesoleptostrophia
- †Michelia
  - †Michelia compacta – or unidentified comparable form
  - †Michelia planogyrata – or unidentified comparable form
  - †Michelia tenue – type locality for species
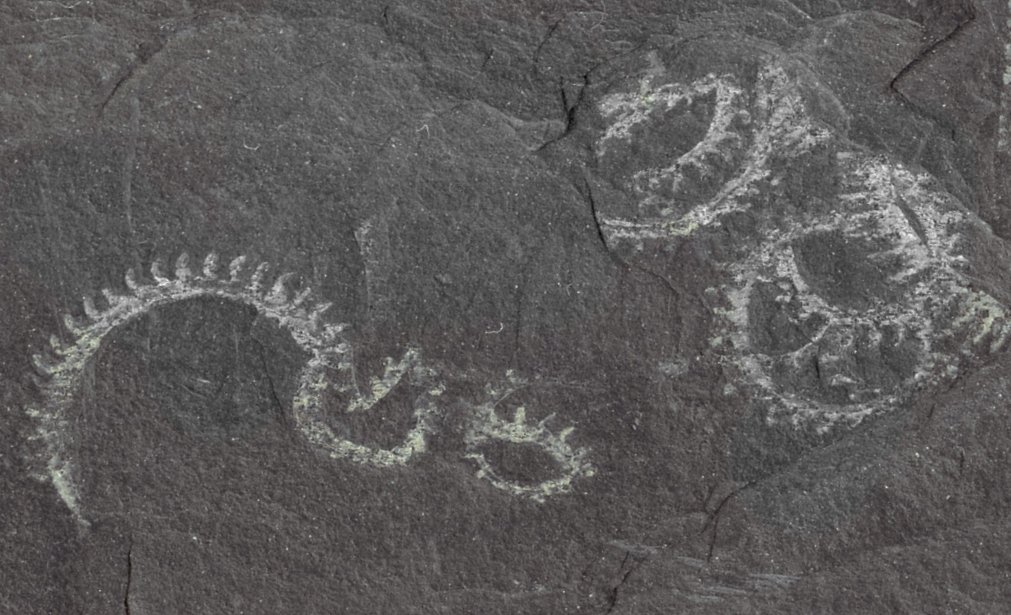
- Fossils of the Early Devonian graptolite Monograptus
  †Monograptus
  - †Monograptus bohemicus
  - †Monograptus chimaera
  - †Monograptus colonus
  - †Monograptus crinitus
  - †Monograptus dubius
  - †Monograptus forbesi
  - †Monograptus nilssoni
  - †Monograptus scanicus
  - †Monograptus tumescens
  - †Monograptus varians
  - †Monograptus vicinus – or unidentified comparable form
- †Neumanella
- †Nicholsonella
- †Nileus
- †Nucleospira
- †Nylanderina – type locality for genus
  - †Nylanderina goldringae – type locality for species
- †Orthambonites
  - †Orthambonites robusta
- †Orthonychia
  - †Orthonychia aroostooki – type locality for species
  - †Orthonychia compressa – type locality for species
- †Paleocyclus – tentative report
- †Paralenorthis
  - †Paralenorthis robustus
- †Paraliospira
  - †Paraliospira angulata – or unidentified related form
- †Patellostium
  - †Patellostium revolvens – type locality for species
- †Pentamerus – tentative report
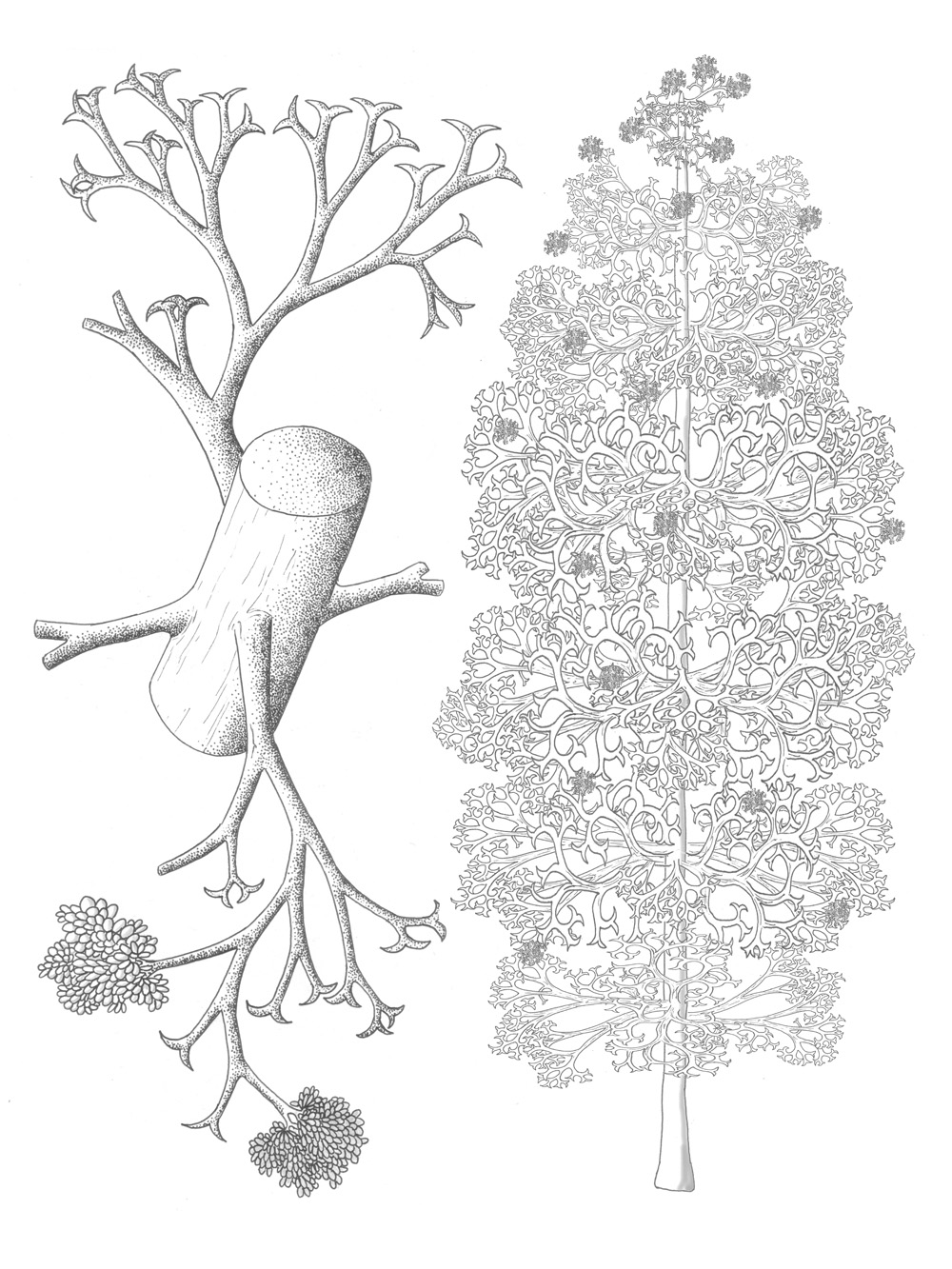
- Life restoration of Pertica.
  †Pertica – type locality for genus
  - †Pertica quadrifaria – type locality for species
- †Platyceras
  - †Platyceras chapmani – type locality for species
  - †Platyceras edmundi – type locality for species
  - †Platyceras hebes
  - †Platyceras ventricosum
- †Platystrophia
- †Platytoechia
  - †Platytoechia boucoti
- †Plectodonta
- †Plectonotus
  - †Plectonotus trilobatus
- †Polytoechia – tentative report
- †Pragozyga
  - †Pragozyga jerseyense – type locality for species
- †Productorthis
  - †Productorthis mainensis
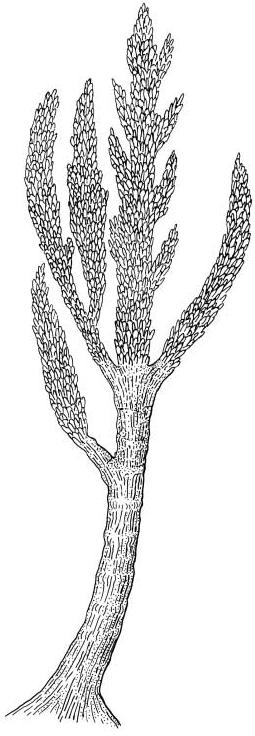
- Life restoration with a conifer-like body plan of the Silurian-Late Devonian tree-like probable fungus Prototaxites. John William Dawson (1888).
  †Prototaxites
- †Psilophyton
  - †Psilophyton dapsile – type locality for species
  - †Psilophyton forbesii – type locality for species
  - †Psilophyton microspinosum – type locality for species
  - †Psilophyton princeps
- †Raymondaspis
- †Resserella
- †Sawdonia
  - †Sawdonia ornata
- †Sphaerochitina
- †Streptotrochus – tentative report
  - †Streptotrochus deciduus – type locality for species
- †Stricklandialens
  - †Stricklandialens ultima – or unidentified comparable form
- †Strophonella
  - †Strophonella euglypha
- †Strophostylus
  - †Strophostylus globosus – or unidentified comparable form
- †Taeniocrada
- †Tholisporites
- †Thursophyton
- †Tritoechia
- †Trochonemella
  - †Trochonemella churkini – or unidentified related form
- †Tropidodiscus
  - †Tropidodiscus minimus
  - †Tropidodiscus obex

== Mesozoic ==
The Paleobiology Database records no known occurrences of Mesozoic fossils in Maine.

== Cenozoic ==
This list of the Cenozoic life of Maine contains the various prehistoric life-forms whose fossilized remains have been reported from within the US state of Maine and are from 66 million years of age to geologically recent.

- Astarte
  - †Astarte borealis
  - †Astarte castanea
  - †Astarte elliptica
  - †Astarte montagui
  - †Astarte sulcata
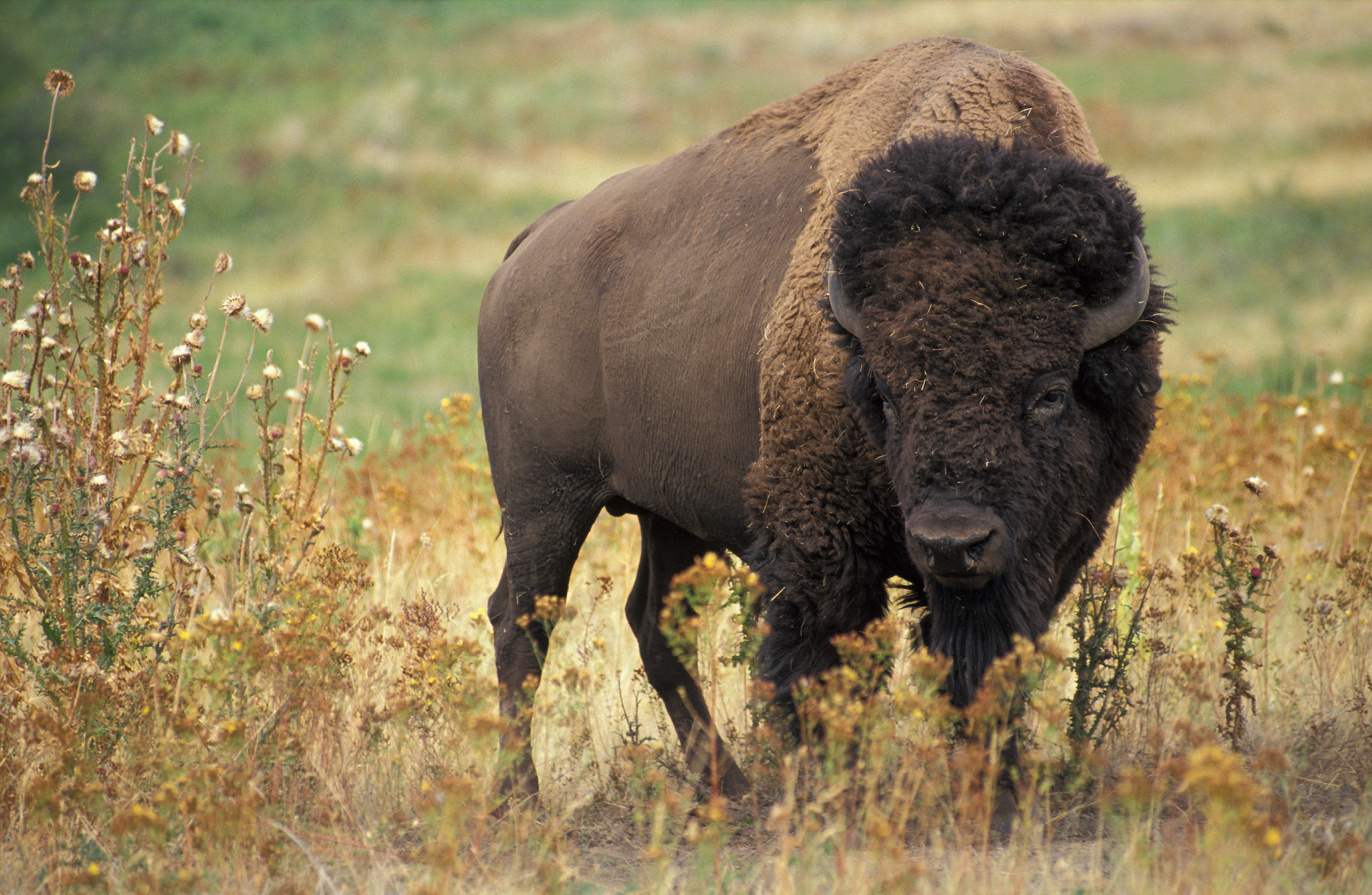
- A living Bison
  Bison
- Buccinum
  - †Buccinum cyaneum
  - †Buccinum glaciale
  - †Buccinum polare
  - †Buccinum scalariforme
  - †Buccinum undatum
- Chlamys
  - †Chlamys islandica
- Ciliatocardium
  - †Ciliatocardium ciliatum
- Colus
  - †Colus stimpsoni
- Cryptonatica
  - †Cryptonatica affinis
- Ennucula
  - †Ennucula tenuis
- Ensis
  - †Ensis directus
- Erignathus
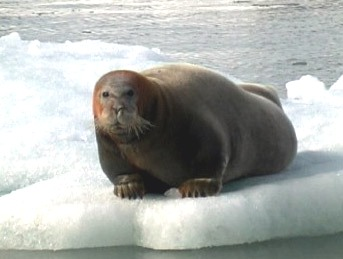
  - A living Erignathus barbatus, or bearded seal
    †Erignathus barbatus
- Euspira
  - †Euspira pallida
- Goethemia
  - †Goethemia pinnulata
- Hemimactra
  - †Hemimactra solidissima
- Hiatella
  - †Hiatella arctica
  - †Hiatella distorta
- Lyonsia
  - †Lyonsia arenosa
- Macoma
  - †Macoma balthica
  - †Macoma calcarea
  - †Macoma groenlandica
  - †Macoma subulosa
- Mactromeris
  - †Mactromeris polynyma
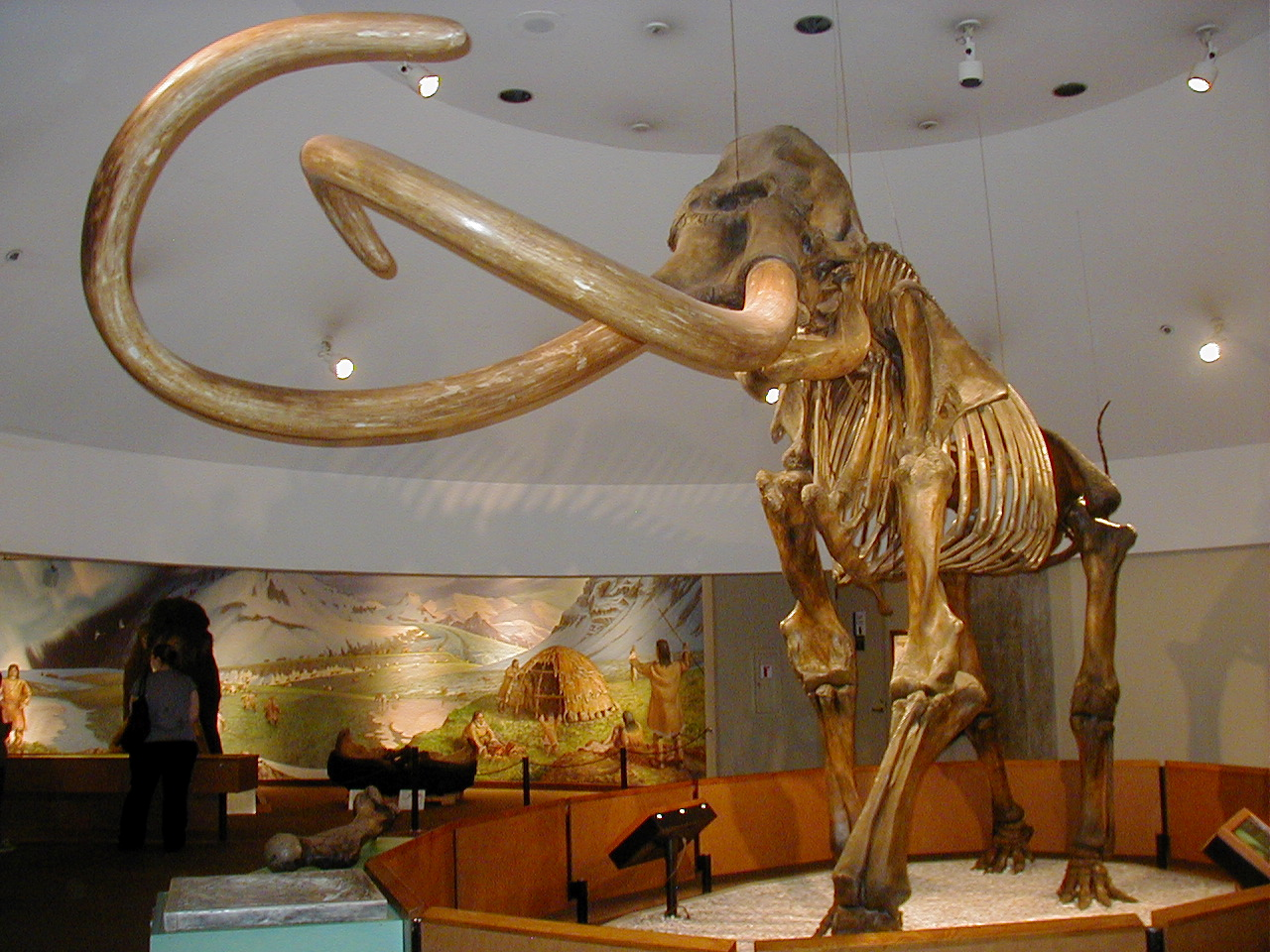
- Fossilized skeleton of the Pliocene-Holocene elephant relative Mammuthus, or mammoth
  †Mammuthus
- Margarites
  - †Margarites striatus
- Mesodesma
  - †Mesodesma arctatum
- Musculus
  - †Musculus discors
  - †Musculus glacialis
  - †Musculus niger
- †Mya
  - †Mya arenaria
  - †Mya truncata
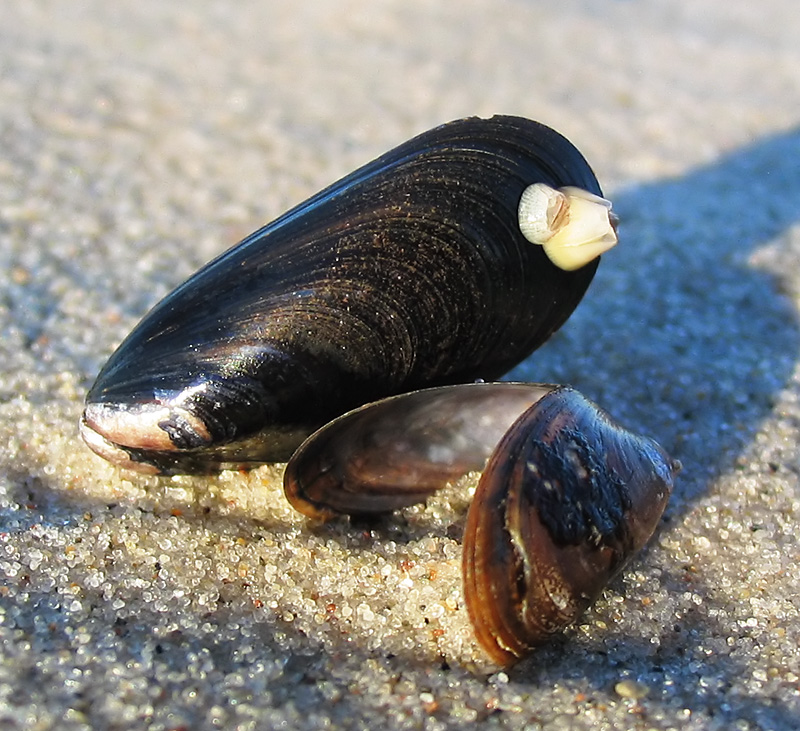
- Shells washed ashore of Mytilus mussels
  Mytilus
  - †Mytilus edulis
- Neptunea
  - †Neptunea despecta
  - †Neptunea lyrata
- Nucella
  - †Nucella lapillus
- Nucula
  - †Nucula antiqua
  - †Nucula proxima
- Nuculana
  - †Nuculana pernula
  - †Nuculana tenuisulcata
- Odobenus
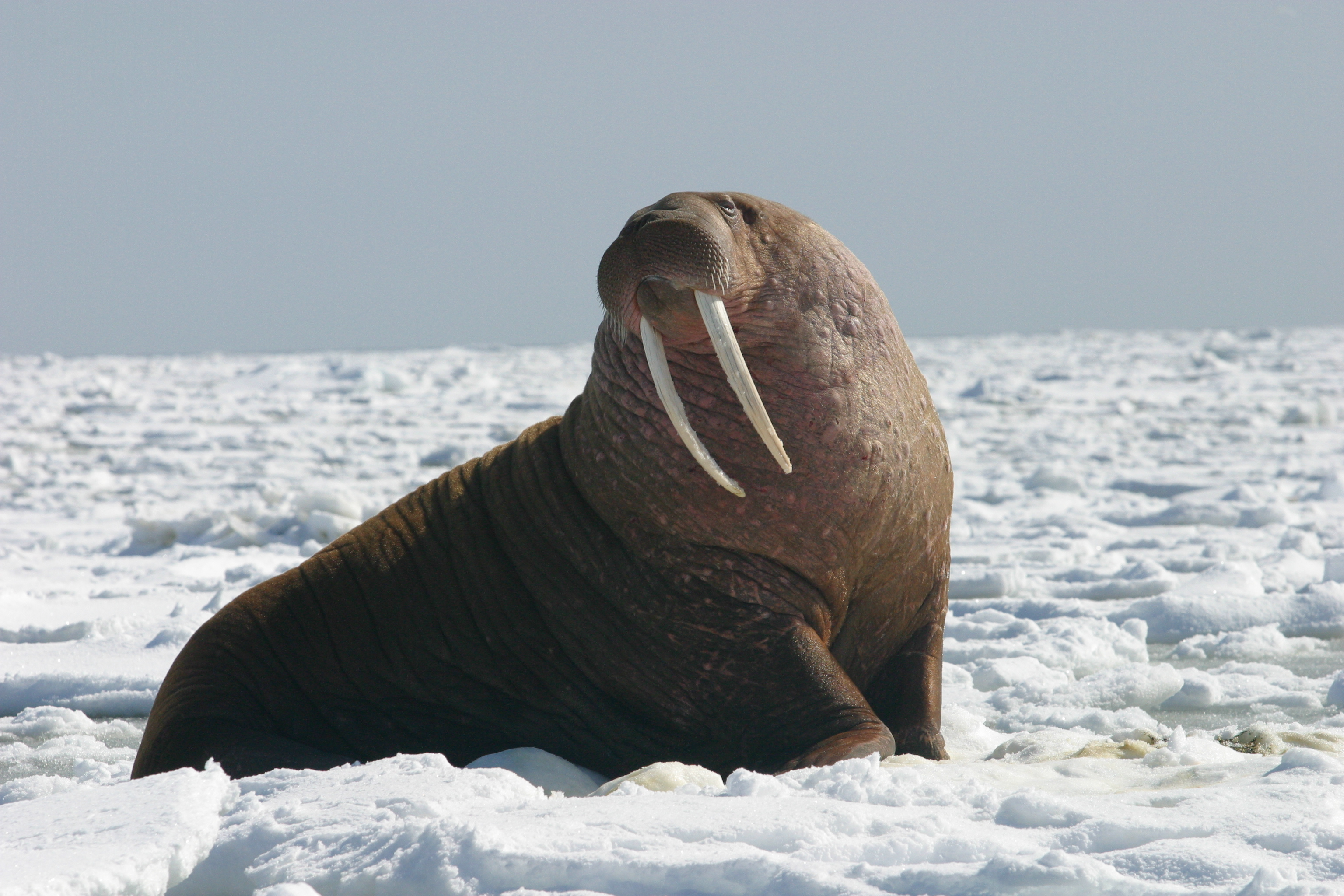
  - A living Odobenus rosmarus, or walrus
    †Odobenus rosmarus
- Pagophilus
  - †Pagophilus groenlandica
- Pandora
  - †Pandora arctica
  - †Pandora glacialis
  - †Pandora trilineata
- Placopecten
  - †Placopecten magellanicus
- Portlandia
  - †Portlandia arctica
  - †Portlandia glacialis
- Puncturella
  - †Puncturella noachina
- Saccella
  - †Saccella pernula
- Serripes
  - †Serripes groenlandicus
- Similipecten
  - †Similipecten greenlandicus
- Tectonatica
  - †Tectonatica pusilla
- Thracia
  - †Thracia conradi
  - †Thracia septentrionalis
- Thyasira
  - †Thyasira gouldii
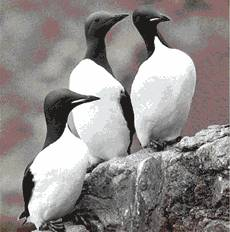
- Living Uria, also known as murres of guillemots
  Uria
  - †Uria affinis – type locality for species
- Yoldia
  - †Yoldia myalis
- Yoldiella
  - †Yoldiella lenticula
- Zirfaea
  - †Zirfaea crispata
