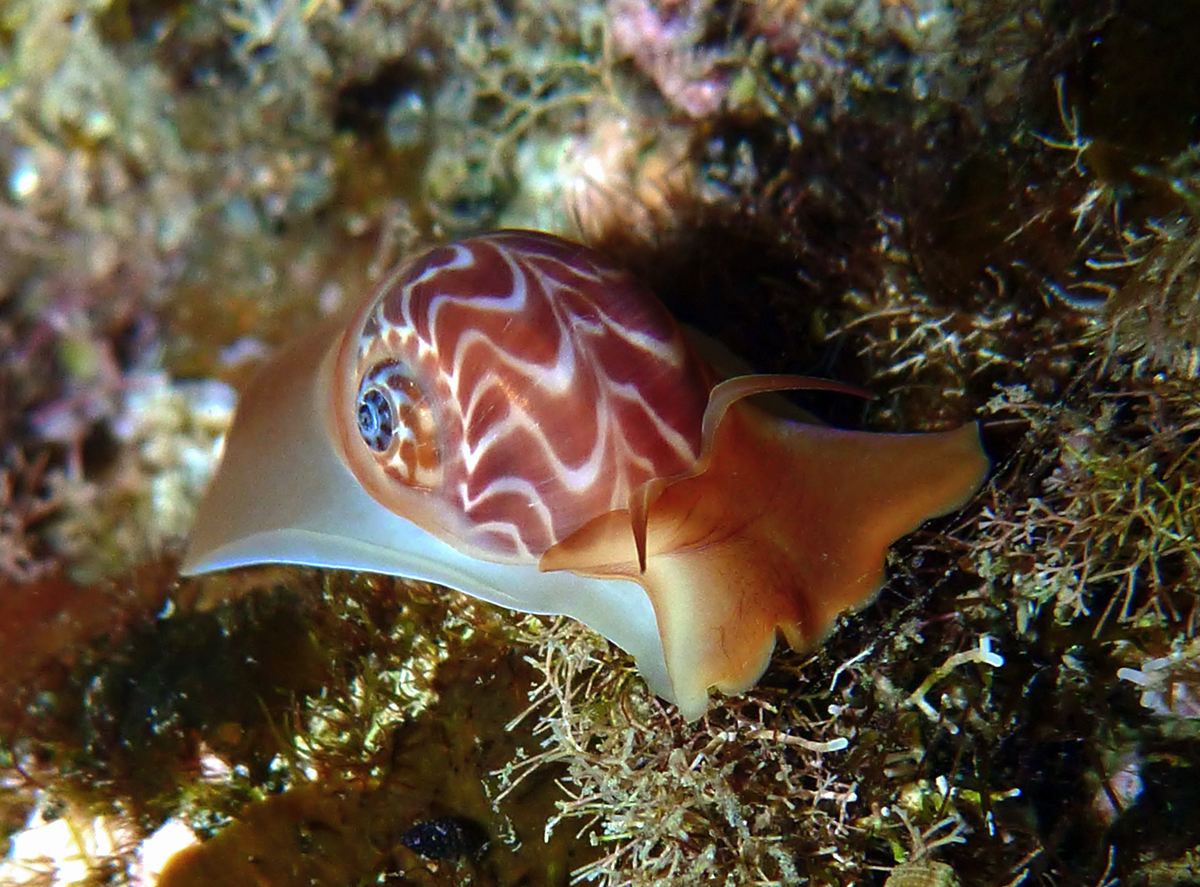
- Tectonatica violacea

Scientific classification
- Kingdom: Animalia
- Phylum: Mollusca
- Class: Gastropoda
- Subclass: Caenogastropoda
- Order: Littorinimorpha
- Superfamily: Naticoidea
- Family: Naticidae
- Subfamily: Naticinae
- Genus: Tectonatica; Sacco, 1890

Type species
- Tectonatica tectula Sacco, F., 1890

= Tectonatica =

Tectonatica Temporal range: Eocene – Present

Genus of gastropods

Tectonatica is a genus of sea snails, marine gastropod molluscs in the subfamily Naticinae of the family Naticidae, the moon snails.

== Fossil record ==
Fossils of Tectonatica are found in marine strata from the Eocene until the Quaternary (age range: from 61.7 to 0.0 million years ago.). Fossils are known from various localities in Europe, North America, South America and Japan.

== Distribution ==
This marine genus occurs in the Indo-West Pacific and off Australia (New South Wales, Northern Territory, Queensland, Tasmania, Victoria, Western Australia).

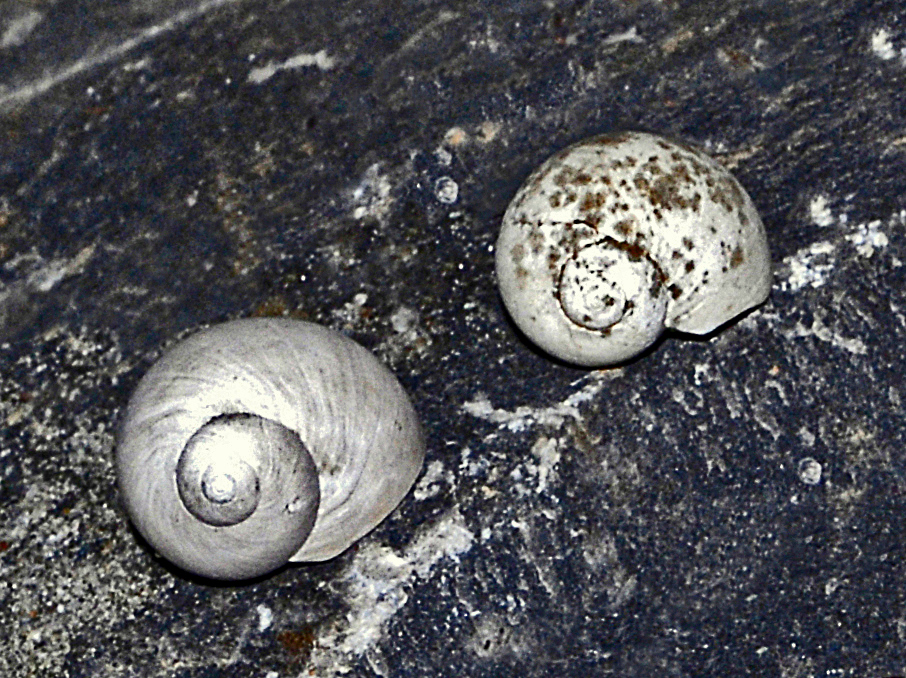
Fossils of Tectonatica astensis from Pliocene of Italy

== Species ==
Species within the genus Tectonatica include:

- Tectonatica bougei (Sowerby III, 1908)
- Tectonatica impervia (Philippi, 1845)
- Tectonatica lactinea (X.-T. Ma & S.-P. Zhang, 1993)
- Tectonatica micra (Haas, 1953)
- † Tectonatica occulta (Deshayes, 1864)
- Tectonatica prietoi (Hidalgo, 1873)
- Tectonatica pusilla (Say, 1822)
- Tectonatica rizzae (Philippi, 1844)
- Tectonatica robillardi (Sowerby, 1894)
- Tectonatica sagraiana (d'Orbigny, 1842)
- Tectonatica shorehami (Pritchard & Gatliff, 1900)
- Tectonatica suffusa (Reeve, 1855)
- Tectonatica tecta (Anton, 1838)
- † Tectonatica tectula (Sacco, 1890)
- Tectonatica violacea (G. B. Sowerby I, 1825)
- Tectonatica zonulata (Thiele, 1930)

Species brought into synonymy

- Tectonatica clausiformis Oyama, 1969: synonym of Cryptonatica affinis (Gmelin, 1791)
- Tectonatica filosa (Philippi, 1845) : synonym of Tectonatica sagraiana (d'Orbigny, 1842)
- Tectonatica flammulata (Requien, 1848): synonym of Tectonatica sagraiana (d'Orbigny, 1842)
- Tectonatica janthostomoides Kuroda & Habe, 1949: synonym of Cryptonatica janthostomoides (Kuroda & Habe, 1949)
- Tectonatica operculata (Jeffreys, 1885): synonym of Cryptonatica operculata (Jeffreys, 1885)
- Tectonatica pavimentum (Recluz, 1844): synonym of Tanea pavimentum (Recluz, 1844)
- Tectonatica rikuzenensis Tiba, 1985: synonym of Cryptonatica ranzii (Kuroda, 1961)
- Tectonatica unicolor (Ma & Zhang, 1993): synonym of Tectonatica lactinea (X.-T. Ma & S.-P. Zhang, 1993)
- Tectonatica venustula (Philippi, 1851): synonym of Notocochlis venustula (Philippi, 1851): synonym of Notocochlis gualteriana (Récluz, 1844)
