= B. gouldii =

B. gouldii may refer to:

- Breviceps gouldii, a frog species in the genus Breviceps
- Buccinum gouldii, a sea snail species

== See also ==
- Gouldii (disambiguation)
