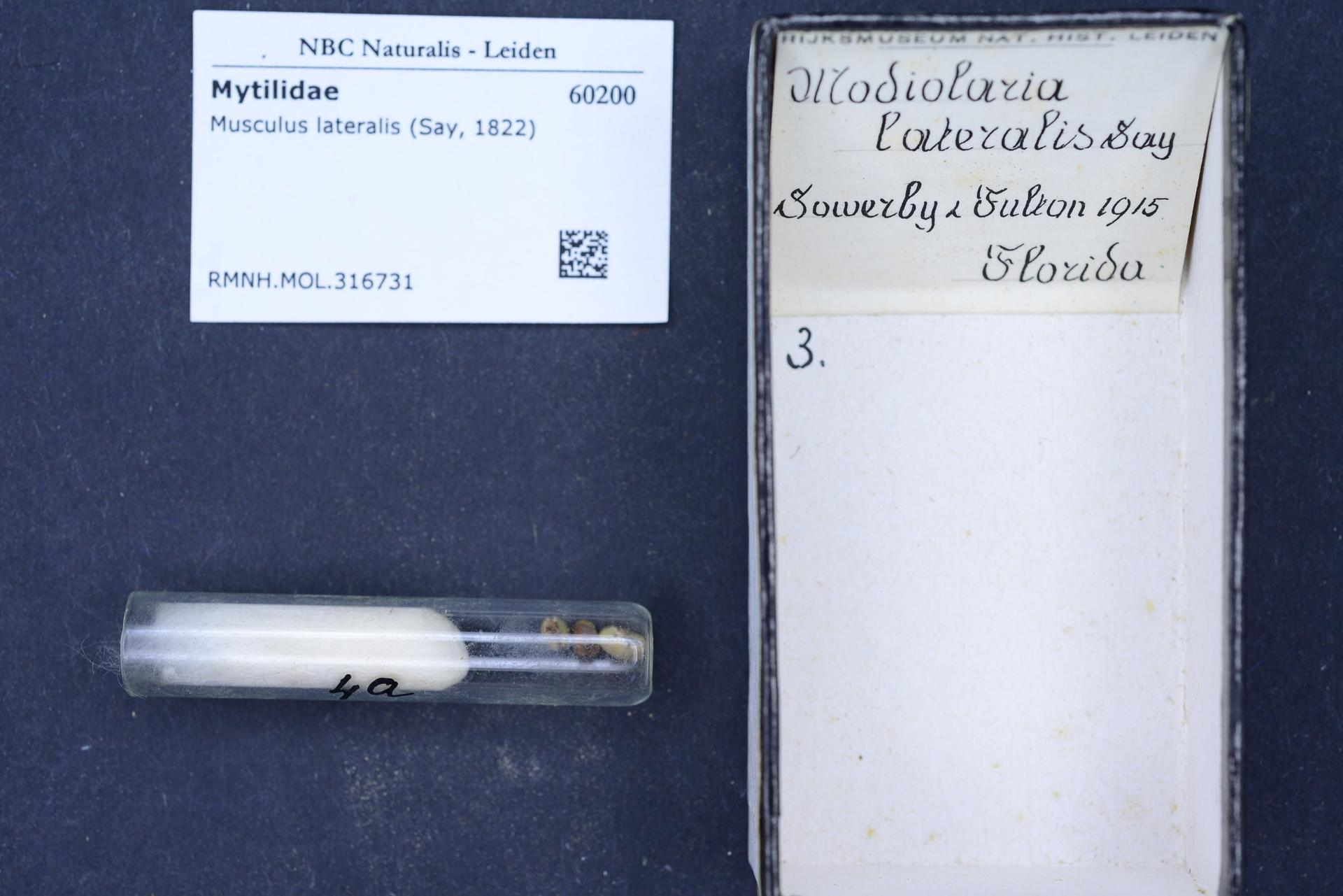

Conservation status
- Secure (NatureServe)

Scientific classification
- Kingdom: Animalia
- Phylum: Mollusca
- Class: Bivalvia
- Order: Mytilida
- Family: Mytilidae
- Genus: Musculus
- Species: M. lateralis

Binomial name
- Musculus lateralis (Say, 1822)

= Musculus lateralis =

Species of bivalve

Musculus lateralis, common name the Lateral mussel, is a small species of bivalve mollusc in the family Mytilidae. It can be found along the Atlantic coast of America, ranging from North Carolina to the West Indies and Brazil.
