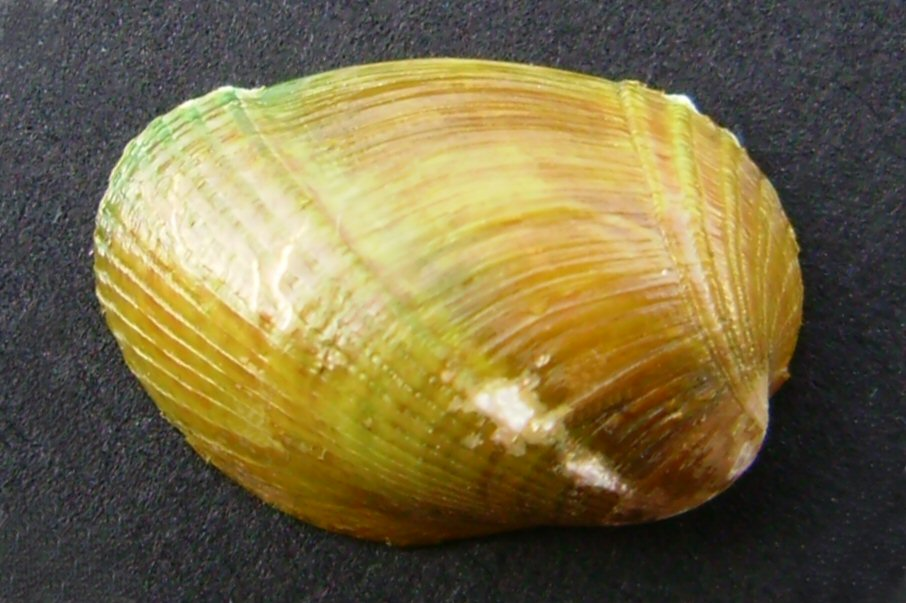

Scientific classification
- Domain: Eukaryota
- Kingdom: Animalia
- Phylum: Mollusca
- Class: Bivalvia
- Order: Mytilida
- Family: Mytilidae
- Genus: Musculus
- Species: M. impactus

Binomial name
- Musculus impactus (Hermann, 1782)

Synonyms
- Mytilus impactus Hermann, 1782 (basionym); Modiola discors Lamarck, 1819; Modiolarca impacta (Hermann, 1782); Musculus (Modiolarca) impacta (Hermann, 1782); Musculus inflatus Thiele, 1930; Musculus novaezeelandiae Röding, 1798; Mytilus (Modiola) ziczac Anton, 1838; Mytilus discors australis O. Fabricius, 1788; Mytilus ziczac Anton, 1838

= Musculus impactus =

Species of bivalve

Musculus impactus is a species of marine bivalve in the family Mytilidae, the mussels. It occurs in the waters off Australia and New Zealand.
