= Monograptus =

Monograptus Temporal range: Telychian-Homerian
- Isolated specimen of Monograptus priodon

Scientific classification
- Kingdom: Animalia
- Phylum: Hemichordata
- Class: Pterobranchia
- Subclass: Graptolithina
- Order: †Graptoloidea
- Suborder: †Axonophora
- Infraorder: †Neograptina
- Family: †Monograptidae
- Genus: †Monograptus; Geinitz, 1852

Type species
- Lomatoceras priodon Bronn, 1835

Genus of marine worm-like animals

Monograptus is a genus of graptolites in the order Graptoloidea.

== History ==
Monograptus was first named Priodon by Sven Nilsson, but this name was never published. Bronn (1935) published the first description of Priodon and mentioned that the genus name was preoccupied by Priodon Cuvier in Quoy and Gaimard, 1825 (today a synonym of the genus Naso Lacépède, 1801). Bronn proposed the replacement genus name Lomatoceras. Other replacement names included Hisinger (1937)'s Prionotus (preoccupied by Prionotus Lacépède, 1801), Barrande (1850)'s Monoprion, and Geinitz (1852)'s Monograpsus, which created taxonomic confusion. The confusion was ended by ICZN Opinion 198, which suppressed Lomatoceras and Monoprion and validated Monograptus.

Historically, Monograptus encompassed almost all monograptid genera with a single stipe (for example, Bulman (1970)'s revision of the Treatise of Invertebrate Paleontology), and this is a continuing problem. However, over 100 genera have been split from Monograptus, and the genus in its restricted form is understood to only include certain species with hooked thecae.

== Description ==
True Monograptus have straight tubaria that may be curved dorsally near the sicula. The thecae are distinctly hooked, with the thecal aperture, which may or may not bear paired lateral spines, pointing towards the sicula. The thecae generally overlap with half or more of their length, and the overlap may increase away from the sicula.

Monograptus s. l. has been historically used to encompass most monograptid genera with one stipe. It is still used as a form genus to encompass monograptid taxa whose thecae are not fully understood.
