= Yoldia cooperii =

Scientific classification
- Kingdom: Animalia
- Phylum: Mollusca
- Class: Bivalvia
- Order: Nuculanida
- Family: Yoldiidae
- Genus: Yoldia
- Species: Y. cooperii

Binomial name
- Yoldia cooperii Gabb, 1865

Species of bivalve

Yoldia cooperii, common name Cooper's yoldia, is a saltwater clam, a marine bivalve mollusk in the family Yoldiidae.
