= Cryptonatica bathybii =

Scientific classification
- Kingdom: Animalia
- Phylum: Mollusca
- Class: Gastropoda
- Subclass: Caenogastropoda
- Order: Littorinimorpha
- Family: Naticidae
- Genus: Cryptonatica
- Species: C. bathybii

Binomial name
- Cryptonatica bathybii (Friele, 1879)

Species of gastropod

Cryptonatica bathybii is a species of predatory sea snail, a marine gastropod mollusc in the family Naticidae, the moon snails.

== Description ==
The maximum recorded shell length is 16.4 mm.

== Habitat ==
Minimum recorded depth is 150 m. Maximum recorded depth is 2000 m.
