= Cryptonatica huanghaiensis =

Scientific classification
- Kingdom: Animalia
- Phylum: Mollusca
- Class: Gastropoda
- Subclass: Caenogastropoda
- Order: Littorinimorpha
- Family: Naticidae
- Genus: Cryptonatica
- Species: C. huanghaiensis

Binomial name
- Cryptonatica huanghaiensis Zhang, 2008

Species of gastropod

Cryptonatica huanghaiensis is a species of predatory sea snail, a marine gastropod mollusc in the family Naticidae, the moon snails.
