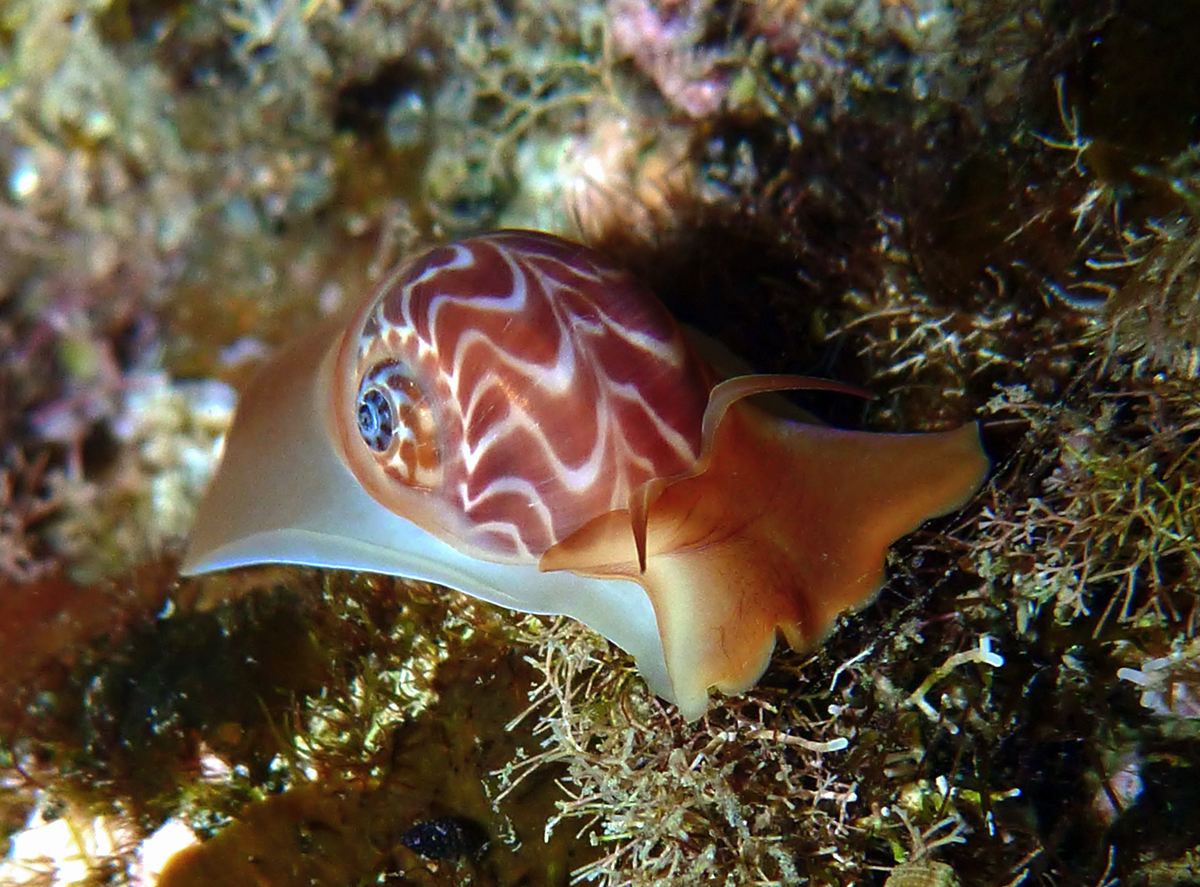

Scientific classification
- Kingdom: Animalia
- Phylum: Mollusca
- Class: Gastropoda
- Subclass: Caenogastropoda
- Order: Littorinimorpha
- Family: Naticidae
- Genus: Tectonatica
- Species: T. violacea

Binomial name
- Tectonatica violacea (G.B. Sowerby I, 1825)

Synonyms
- Natica rhodostoma Philippi, 1842; Natica violacea G.B. Sowerby I, 1825 (basionym); Nerita glabra Wood, 1828

= Tectonatica violacea =

Species of gastropod

Tectonatica violacea, is a common name the violet moon snail, is a species of predatory sea snail, a marine gastropod mollusk in the family Naticidae, the moon snails.

== Description ==
The size of this snail’s shell varies between 12-25 millimeters.

== Distribution ==
This species occurs in the Indo-West Pacific off the Mascarene Basin which is part of the coasts of Philippines and Queensland, Australia.
