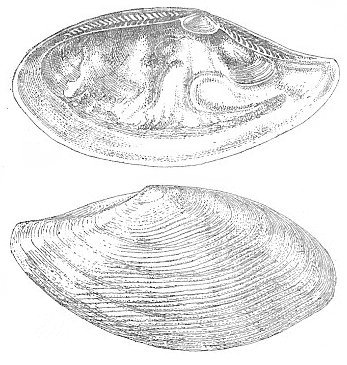
- Internal and external views of a right valve of Yoldia lanceolata

Scientific classification
- Kingdom: Animalia
- Phylum: Mollusca
- Class: Bivalvia
- Order: Nuculanida
- Superfamily: Nuculanoidea
- Family: Yoldiidae; Habe, 1977

Genera
- See text

= Yoldiidae =

Family of bivalves

Yoldiidae is a taxonomic family of small to medium-sized saltwater clams, marine bivalve molluscs in the order Nuculanida.

== Genera and species ==
Genera and species within the family Yoldiidae include:

- Megayoldia
  - Megayoldia martyria
  - Megayoldia montereyensis
  - Megayoldia thraciaeformis
- Microgloma Saunders & Allen, 1973
  - Microgloma guilonardi (D. F. Hoeksema, 1993)
  - Microgloma macaron Benaim & Absalão, 2011
  - Microgloma mirmidina (Dautzenberg & H. Fischer, 1897)
  - Microgloma nhanduti Benaim & Absalão, 2011
  - Microgloma pusilla (Jeffreys, 1879)
  - Microgloma turnerae H. L. Sanders & Allen, 1973
  - Microgloma yongei H. L. Sanders & Allen, 1973
- Portlandia
  - Portlandia aestuariorum
  - Portlandia arctica
  - Portlandia beringii
  - Portlandia dalli
  - Portlandia fraterna
  - Portlandia frigida
  - Portlandia glacialis
  - Portlandia inconspicua
  - Portlandia inflata
  - Portlandia intermedia
  - Portlandia iris
  - Portlandia jeffreysi
  - Portlandia lenticula
  - Portlandia lucida
  - Portlandia minuscula
  - Portlandia sericea
  - Portlandia subangulata
  - Portlandia tamara
- Yoldia Möller, 1842
  - Yoldia amygdalea
  - Yoldia beringiana
  - Yoldia cooperii
  - Yoldia excavata
  - Yoldia glacialis
  - Yoldia hyperborea
  - Yoldia limatula (Say, 1831)
  - Yoldia martyria
  - Yoldia micrometrica
  - Yoldia montereyensis
  - Yoldia myalis (Couthouy, 1838)
  - Yoldia regularis
  - Yoldia sapotilla (Gould, 1841)
  - Yoldia scissurata
  - Yoldia secunda
  - Yoldia seminuda
  - Yoldia solenoides
  - Yoldia thraciaeformis Storer, 1838
- Yoldiella

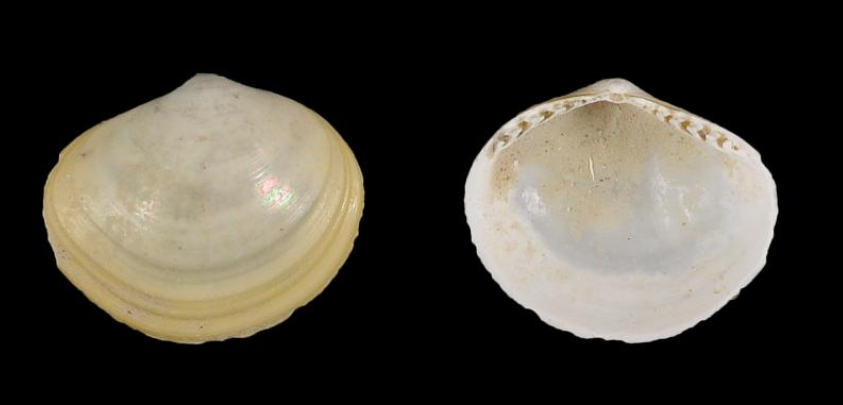
Yoldiella pachia Verrill & Bush, 1898; Mississippi delta

  - Yoldiella cecinella
  - Yoldiella curta
  - Yoldiella dicella
  - Yoldiella dissimilis
  - Yoldiella expansa
  - Yoldiella fraterna
  - Yoldiella frigida
  - Yoldiella inconspicua
  - Yoldiella inflata
  - Yoldiella insculpta
  - Yoldiella intermedia
  - Yoldiella iris
  - Yoldiella jeffreysi
  - Yoldiella lenticula
  - Yoldiella lucida
  - Yoldiella nana
  - Yoldiella oleacina
  - Yoldiella orcia
  - Yoldiella pachia Verrill & Bush, 1898
  - Yoldiella philippiana
  - Yoldiella profundorum
  - Yoldiella propinqua
  - Yoldiella pusilla
  - Yoldiella sagamiana T. Okutani & K. Fujikura, 2022
  - Yoldiella sanesia
  - Yoldiella siliqua
  - Yoldiella striolata
  - Yoldiella subaequilatera
  - Yoldiella subangulata
