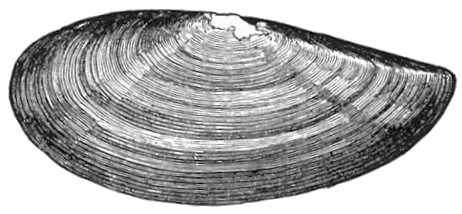

Scientific classification
- Kingdom: Animalia
- Phylum: Mollusca
- Class: Bivalvia
- Order: Nuculanida
- Family: Yoldiidae
- Genus: Yoldia
- Species: Y. limatula

Binomial name
- Yoldia limatula (Say, 1831)

= Yoldia limatula =

Species of bivalve

Yoldia limatula, commonly called the file yoldia, is a clam in the family Yoldiidae. It can be found along the Atlantic coast of North America, from the Gulf of St. Lawrence to New Jersey, as well as along the Pacific coast, from Alaska to San Diego.
