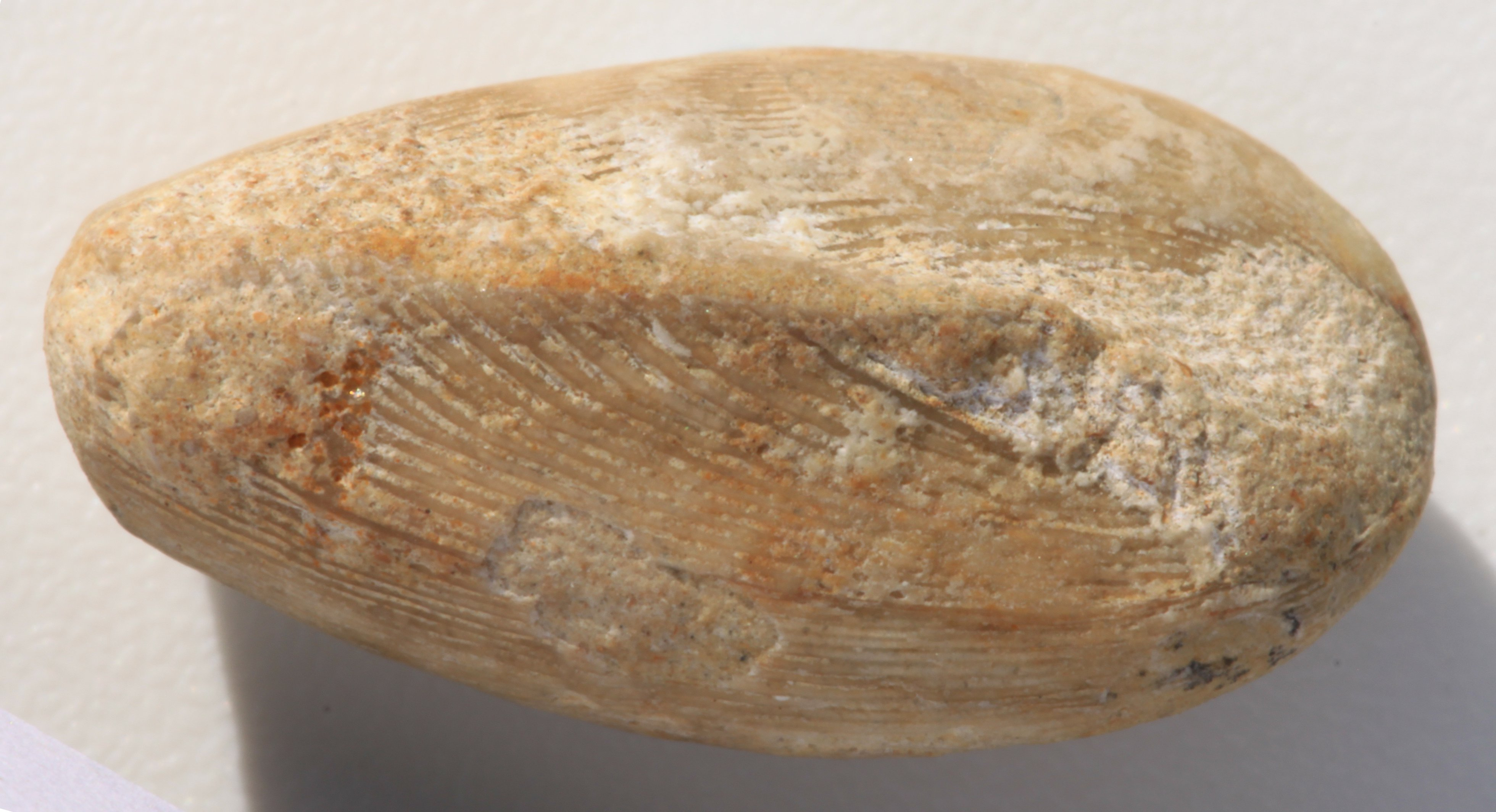
- Musculus somaliensis viewed from the side

Scientific classification
- Kingdom: Animalia
- Phylum: Mollusca
- Class: Bivalvia
- Order: Mytilida
- Family: Mytilidae
- Genus: Musculus
- Species: †M. somaliensis

Binomial name
- †Musculus somaliensis Cox, 1935

Synonyms
- Modiola aspera, M. autissiodorensis

= Musculus somaliensis =

Musculus somaliensis Temporal range: Late Jurassic

Extinct species of bivalve

Musculus somaliensis is an extinct species of small saltwater mussel, a fossil marine bivalve mollusc in the family Mytilidae, the mussels. The size, shape and sometimes color of these fossils are reminiscent of a pistachio nut.

== Distribution ==
Musculus somaliensis lived during the late Jurassic, possibly throughout the Ethiopian Faunal Province, which consisted of Ethiopia, Somalia, Jordan, Yemen, Kenya, Madagascar, Saudi Arabia, and Tunisia according to Kiessling. Fossils of M. somaliensis are known from the Upper Jurassic of Somalia (Callovian/Oxfordian in Jirba Range, Biyo Dader Tug, Bihendula), Ethiopia (Callovian in Mt. Guresu, Marda Pass; Late Oxfordian in Antalo Limestone north of Mekele) and Tunisia (Late Callovian/Oxfordian in Ghomrassen; Middle Callovian/Late Callovian in Ksar Ben Soltane, Krechem el Miit; Callovian/Early Oxfordian in Foum Tataouine Post Optique; Callovian/Oxfordian in Bir Remtha, Faljet Jdar/Ed-Dghaghra).

== Habitat ==
The fossil locations cited were tropical shallow seas, where this mussel lived as a stationary epifaunal suspension feeder.

== Description ==
Musculus somaliensis has a modioliform shape with a straight to weakly convex dorsal margin. A rounded carina runs from the umbo to the postero-ventral corner of the shell, forming an angle of c. 45° with the dorsal margin, ventrally followed by a shallow sulcus. The antero-ventral part of the shell is inflated and has a convex antero-ventral margin. Its carina is more strongly curved and in its distal part forms an angle of c. 60–70° with the dorsal margin. A sulcus is absent, the antero-ventral part is low and limited by a concave antero-ventral margin.
