= Tectonatica robillardi =

Scientific classification
- Kingdom: Animalia
- Phylum: Mollusca
- Class: Gastropoda
- Subclass: Caenogastropoda
- Order: Littorinimorpha
- Family: Naticidae
- Genus: Tectonatica
- Species: T. robillardi

Binomial name
- Tectonatica robillardi (Sowerby III, 1894)

Synonyms
- Natica ren Preston, H.B., 1914; Natica robillardi Sowerby, 1894 (basionym)

Species of gastropod

Tectonatica robillardi is a species of predatory sea snail, a marine gastropod mollusk in the family Naticidae, the moon snails.

== Description ==
The size af an adult shell varies between 6 mm and 20 mm.

== Distribution ==
This marine species is found in the Indo-West Pacific along Madagascar and Réunion.
