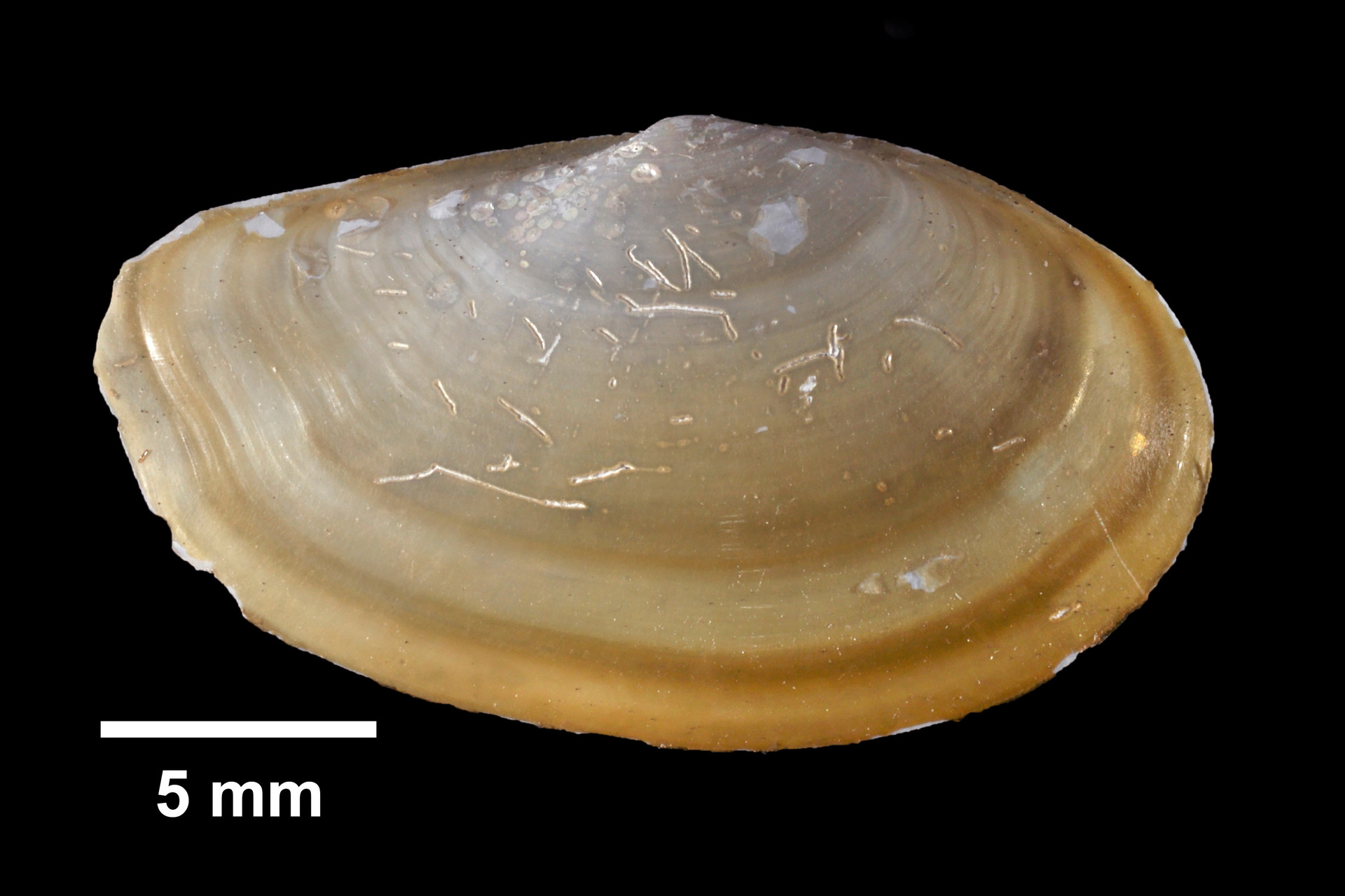

Scientific classification
- Kingdom: Animalia
- Phylum: Mollusca
- Class: Bivalvia
- Order: Nuculanida
- Family: Yoldiidae
- Genus: Yoldia
- Species: Y. sapotilla

Binomial name
- Yoldia sapotilla (Gould, 1841)

= Yoldia sapotilla =

Species of bivalve

Yoldia sapotilla, or the short yoldia, is a clam in the family Yoldiidae. It can be found along the Atlantic coast of North America, ranging from Labrador to North Carolina.
