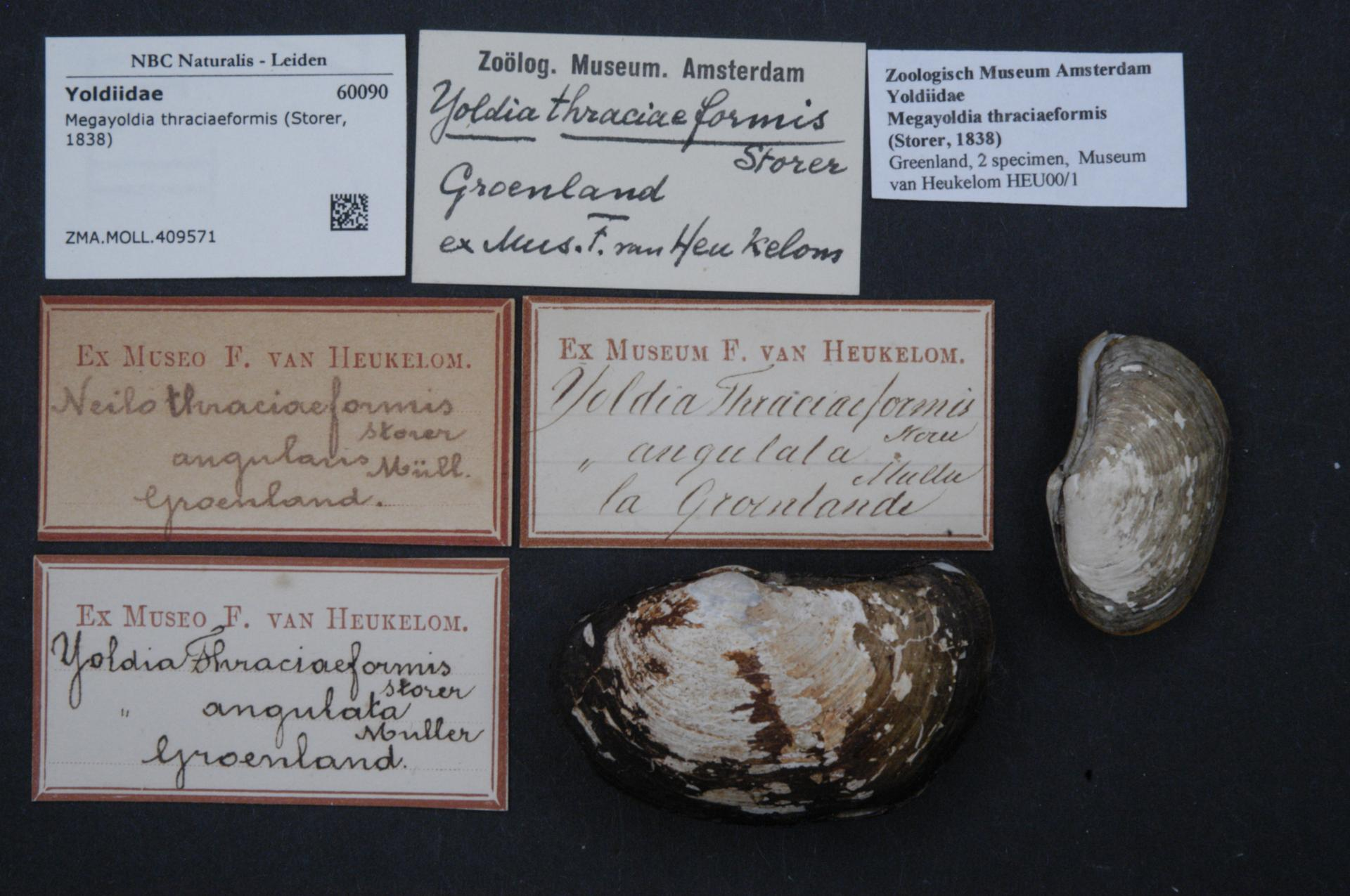

Scientific classification
- Kingdom: Animalia
- Phylum: Mollusca
- Class: Bivalvia
- Order: Nuculanida
- Family: Yoldiidae
- Genus: Yoldia
- Species: Y. thraciaeformis

Binomial name
- Yoldia thraciaeformis Storer, 1838

= Yoldia thraciaeformis =

Species of bivalve

Yoldia thraciaeformis, or the broad yoldia, is a clam in the family Yoldiidae. It can be found along the Atlantic coast of North America, from the Arctic Ocean to North Carolina, as well as along the Pacific coast, from the Arctic Ocean to Oregon.
