= Tectonatica tecta =

Scientific classification
- Kingdom: Animalia
- Phylum: Mollusca
- Class: Gastropoda
- Subclass: Caenogastropoda
- Order: Littorinimorpha
- Family: Naticidae
- Genus: Tectonatica
- Species: T. tecta

Binomial name
- Tectonatica tecta (Anton, 1838)

Synonyms
- Natica alfredensis Bartsch, 1915; Natica aureozona Tomlin, 1921; Natica genuana Reeve, 1855; Natica imperforata Gray, 1839; Natica stimpsoni Bartsch, 1915; Natica tecta Anton, 1838 (original combination)

Species of gastropod

Tectonatica tecta, common name the mottled necklace shell, is a species of predatory sea snail, a marine gastropod mollusk in the family Naticidae, the moon snails.

== Distribution ==
This marine species occurs in the Atlantic Ocean off Namibia; off the south and west coast of South Africa; in the Indian Ocean off Mozambique and Madagascar.
