= Cryptonatica operculata =

Scientific classification
- Kingdom: Animalia
- Phylum: Mollusca
- Class: Gastropoda
- Subclass: Caenogastropoda
- Order: Littorinimorpha
- Family: Naticidae
- Genus: Cryptonatica
- Species: C. operculata

Binomial name
- Cryptonatica operculata (Jeffreys, 1885)

Species of gastropod

Cryptonatica operculata is a species of predatory sea snail, a marine gastropod mollusc in the family Naticidae, the moon snails.
