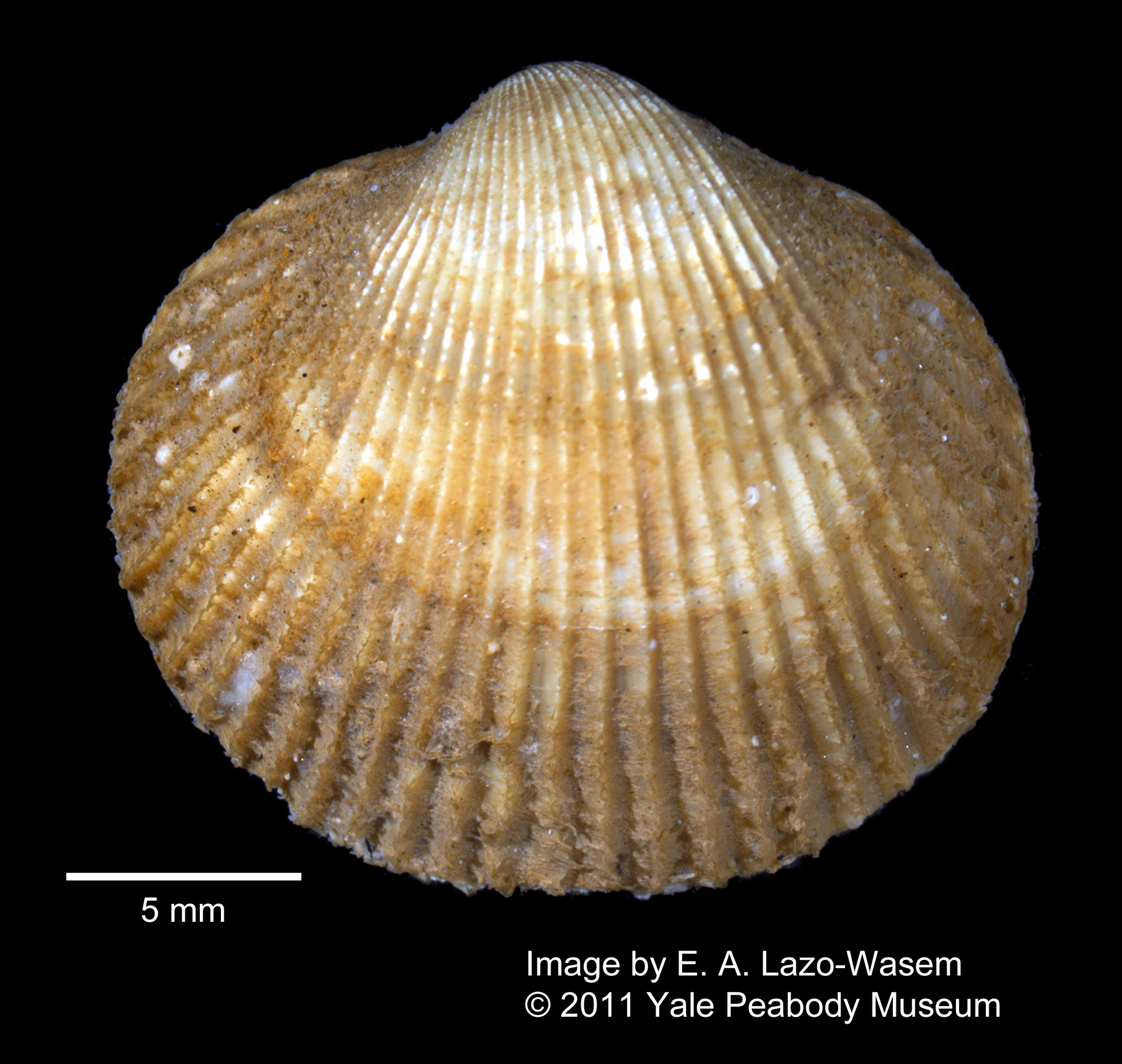

Scientific classification
- Kingdom: Animalia
- Phylum: Mollusca
- Class: Bivalvia
- Order: Cardiida
- Family: Cardiidae
- Genus: Ciliatocardium
- Species: C. ciliatum

Binomial name
- Ciliatocardium ciliatum (O. Fabricius, 1780)

Synonyms
- Clinocardium ciliatum O. Fabricius, 1780

= Ciliatocardium ciliatum =

Species of bivalve

Ciliatocardium ciliatum, also known as the Iceland cockle, is a species of bivalve mollusc in the family Cardiidae. It can be found along the Atlantic coast of North America, ranging from Greenland to Massachusetts.
