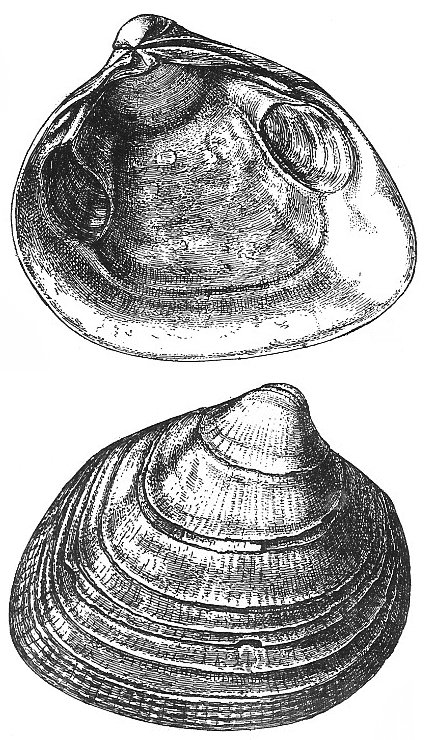

Scientific classification
- Kingdom: Animalia
- Phylum: Mollusca
- Class: Bivalvia
- Order: Cardiida
- Family: Cardiidae
- Genus: Serripes
- Species: Serripes

Binomial name
- Serripes Gould, 1841

= Serripes =

Genus of bivalves

Serripes is a genus of molluscs in the family Cardiidae.

== Species ==
- Serripes groenlandicus (Mohr, 1786) — Greenland cockle
- Serripes laperousii (Deshayes, 1839)
- Serripes notabilis (G. B. Sowerby III, 1915)
