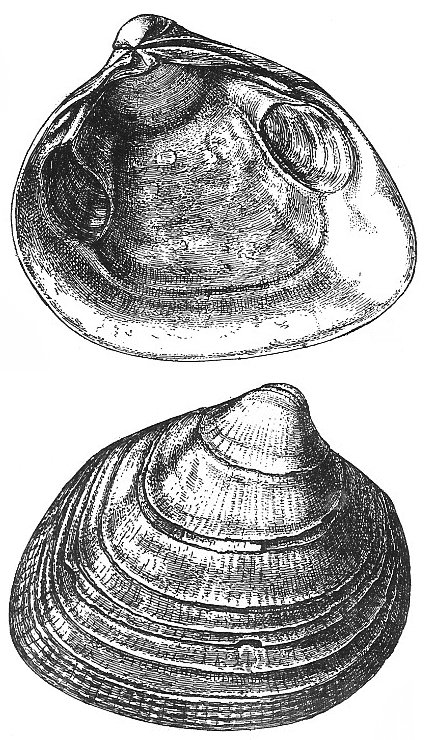

Conservation status
- Secure (NatureServe)

Scientific classification
- Kingdom: Animalia
- Phylum: Mollusca
- Class: Bivalvia
- Order: Cardiida
- Family: Cardiidae
- Genus: Serripes
- Species: S. groenlandicus

Binomial name
- Serripes groenlandicus (Mohr, 1786)

= Serripes groenlandicus =

Species of mollusc

Serripes groenlandicus, the Greenland cockle, is a species of bivalve mollusc in the family Cardiidae. It can be found along the Atlantic coast of North America, ranging from Greenland to Cape Cod, as well as along the Pacific coast, from Alaska to Washington.
