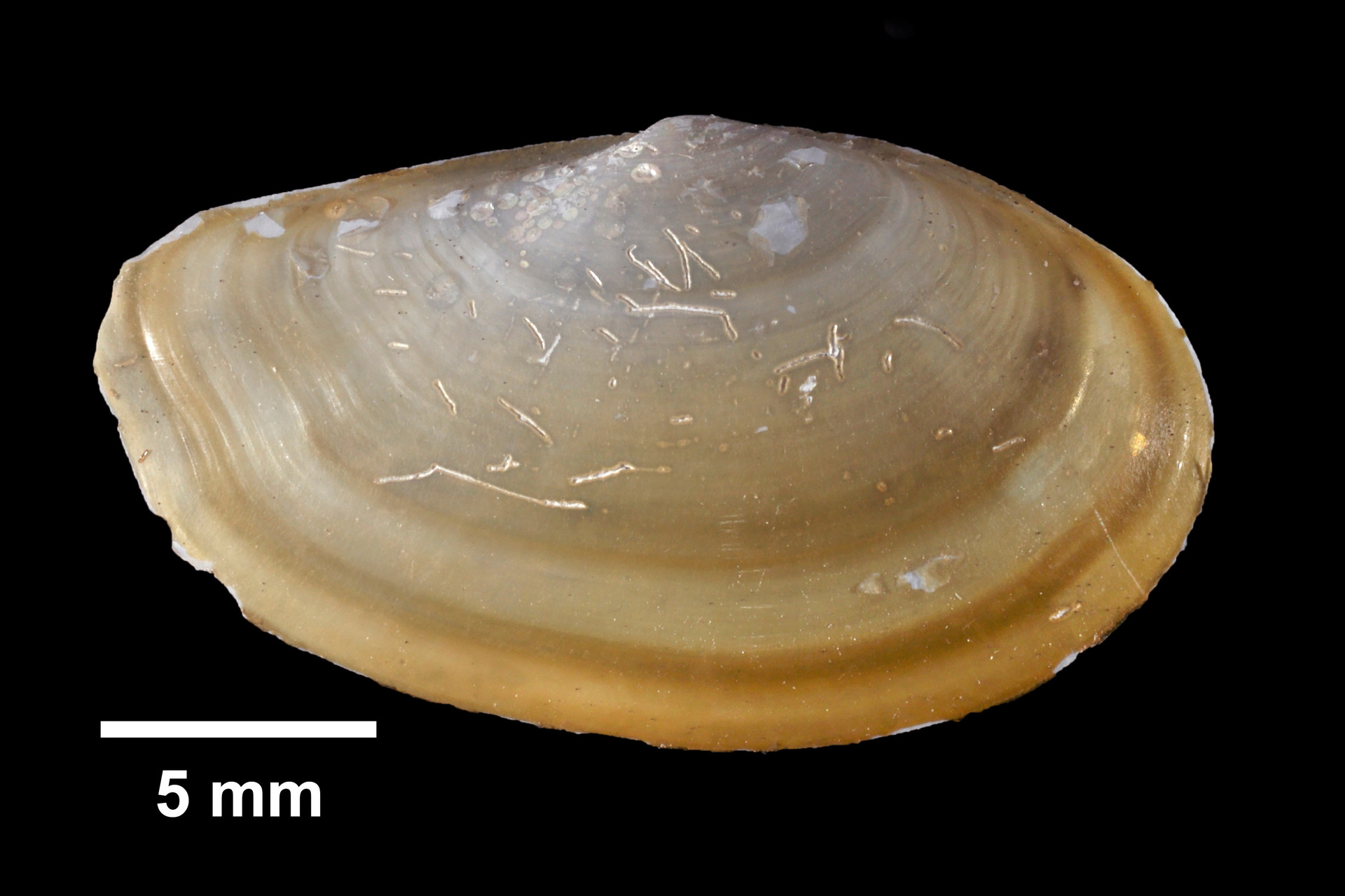
- Yoldia sapotilla

Scientific classification
- Kingdom: Animalia
- Phylum: Mollusca
- Class: Bivalvia
- Order: Nuculanida
- Family: Yoldiidae
- Genus: Yoldia; Møller, 1842

= Yoldia =

Genus of bivalves

Yoldia is a genus of marine bivalve mollusks in the family Yoldiidae. Some former members of the genus are now known as Portlandia. The genus was named after Alfonso de Aguirre y Yoldi, Conde de Yoldi (1764–1852), a Spanish nobleman in charge of the royal naturalistic collection of Denmark.

== Species ==
Species that were within the genus Yoldia include:

- Yoldia aeolica (Valenciennes, 1846)
- Yoldia amygdalea Valenciennes, 1846
- Yoldia aurata Lan & Lee, 2001
- Yoldia bartschi Scarlato, 1981
- Yoldia cooperii Gabb, 1865
- Yoldia glauca Kuroda & Habe in Habe, 1961
- Yoldia hyperborea (Gould, 1841)
- Yoldia johanni Dall, 1925
- Yoldia keppeliana G. B. Sowerby III, 1904
- Yoldia kikuchii Kuroda, 1929
- Yoldia lata (Hinds, 1843)
- Yoldia limatula (Say, 1831)
- Yoldia micrometrica Seguenza G., 1877
- Yoldia myalis (Couthouy, 1838)
- Yoldia notabilis Yokoyama, 1922
- Yoldia pygmaea (Muenster, 1835)
- Yoldia sapotilla (Gould, 1841)
- Yoldia similis Kuroda & Habe in Habe, 1961
- Yoldia thraciaeformis Storer, 1838
- Yoldia toporoki Scarlato, 1981
