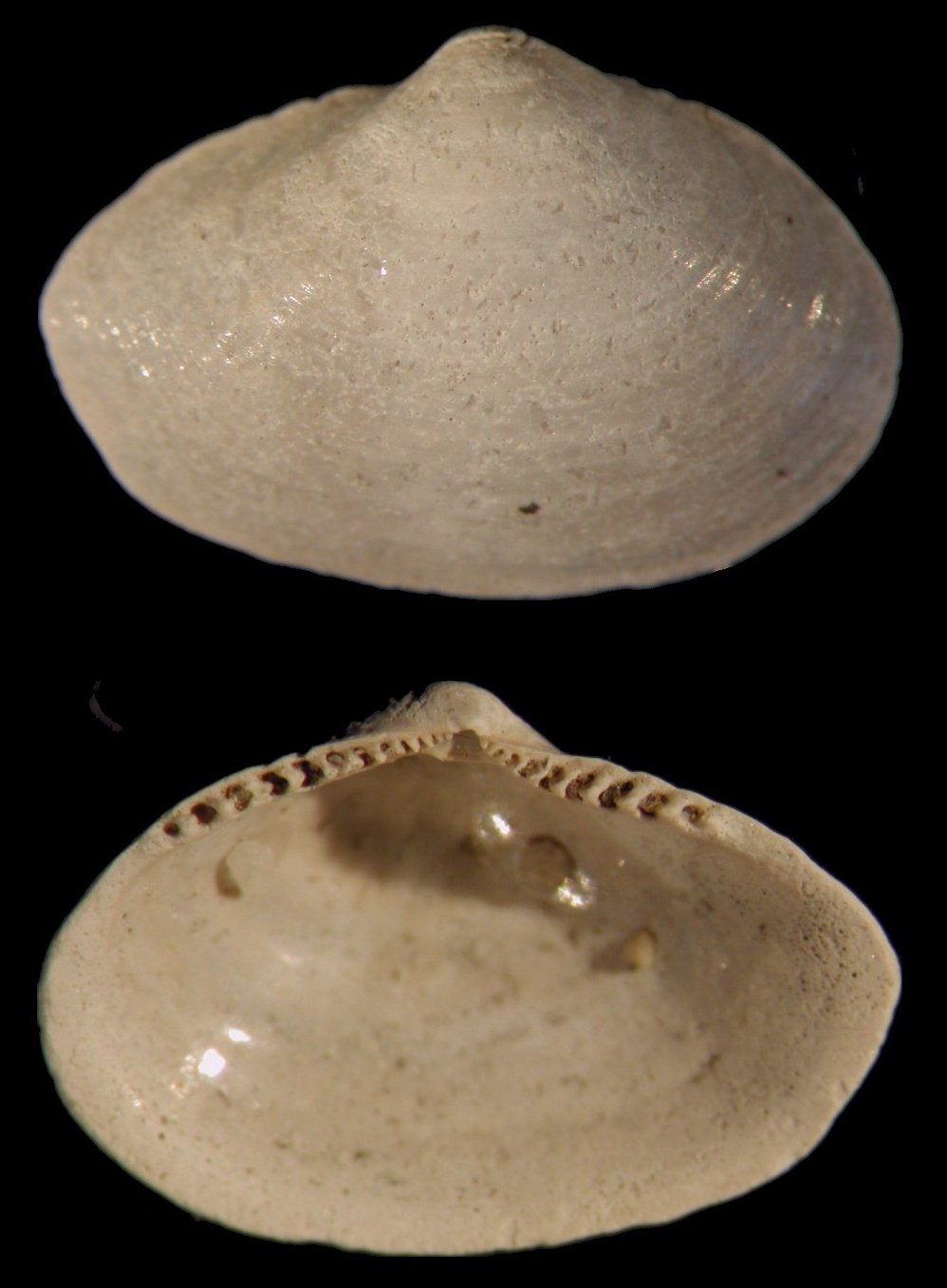
- Fossil Portlandia arctica

Scientific classification
- Kingdom: Animalia
- Phylum: Mollusca
- Class: Bivalvia
- Order: Nuculanida
- Family: Yoldiidae
- Genus: Portlandia; Mörch, 1857

Synonyms
- Nuculana (Portlandia) Mörch, 1857; Leda (Portlandia) Mörch, 1857

= Portlandia (bivalve) =

Genus of bivalves

Portlandia is a genus of marine bivalve mollusks in the family Yoldiidae. They can be found in all the oceans. The genus includes Portlandia arctica, the bivalve which gave its name – when it was still known as Yoldia arctica – to the Yoldia Sea.

== Species ==
There are six recognized species:

- Portlandia aestuariorum (Mosevich, 1928)
- Portlandia arctica (Gray, 1824)
- Portlandia glacialis (J. E. Gray, 1825)
- Portlandia isonota (Martens, 1881)
- Portlandia pachia (A. E. Verrill & Bush, 1898)
- Portlandia sulcifera (Reeve, 1855)
