= Yoldia myalis =

Scientific classification
- Kingdom: Animalia
- Phylum: Mollusca
- Class: Bivalvia
- Order: Nuculanida
- Family: Yoldiidae
- Genus: Yoldia
- Species: Y. myalis

Binomial name
- Yoldia myalis (Couthouy, 1838)

Species of bivalve

Yoldia myalis, or the comb yoldia, is a clam in the family Yoldiidae. It can be found along the Atlantic coast of North America, ranging from Labrador to Massachusetts, as well as along the Alaskan coast.
