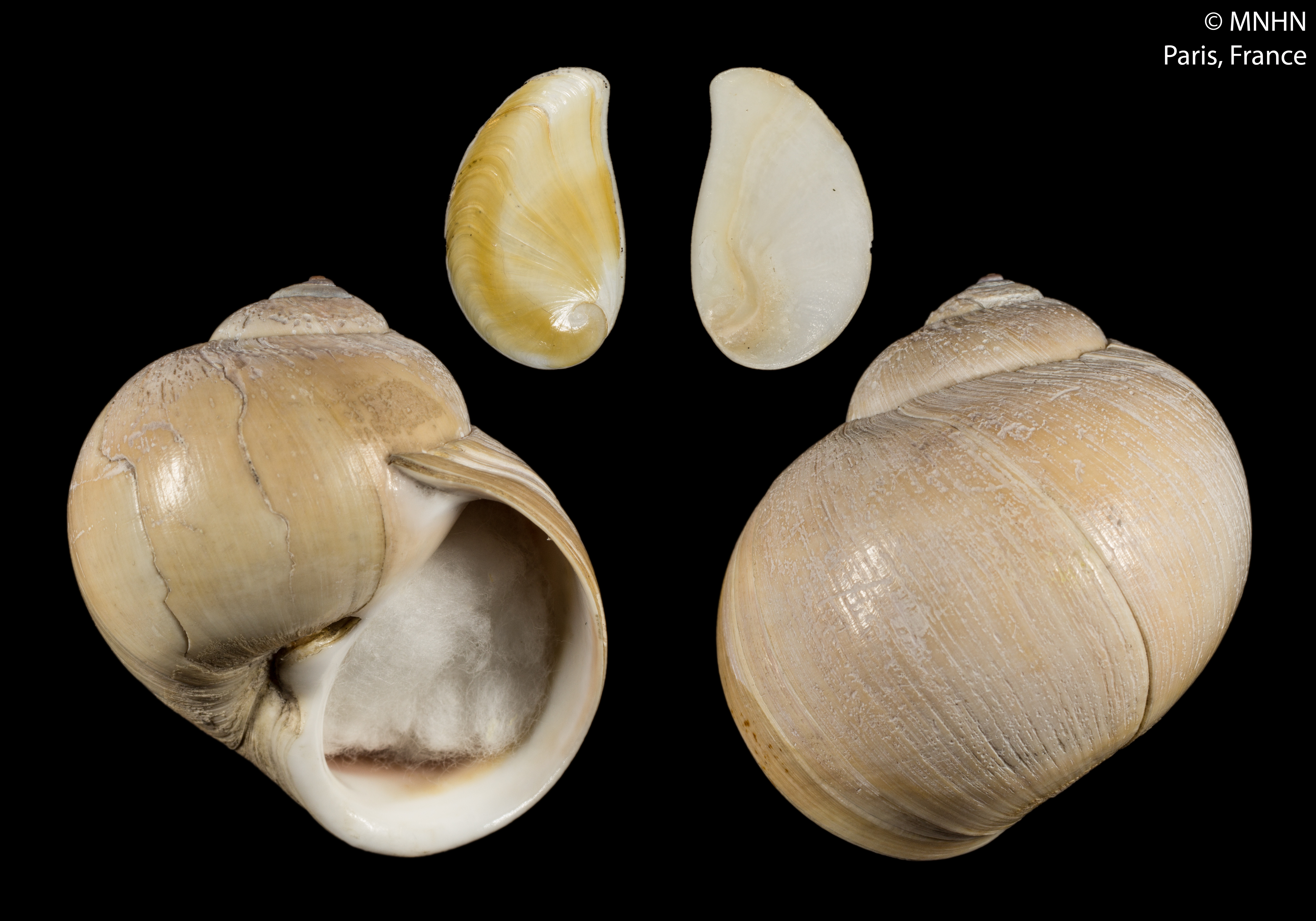
- Shell of Cryptonatica janthostoma (syntype at MNHN, Paris)

Scientific classification
- Kingdom: Animalia
- Phylum: Mollusca
- Class: Gastropoda
- Subclass: Caenogastropoda
- Order: Littorinimorpha
- Superfamily: Naticoidea
- Family: Naticidae
- Subfamily: Naticinae
- Genus: Cryptonatica; Dall, 1892

Type species
- Natica clausa Broderip & G. B. Sowerby I, 1829

Synonyms
- Boreonatica Golikov & Kussakin, 1974 (junior objective synonym of Cryptonatica); Natica (Cryptonatica) Dall, 1892 (original rank); Sulconatica Golikov & Kussakin, 1974

= Cryptonatica =

Genus of gastropods

Cryptonatica is a genus of predatory sea snails, marine gastropod mollusks in the family Naticidae, the moon snails.

== Species ==
Species within the genus Cryptonatica include:

- Cryptonatica adamsiana (Dunker, 1860)
- Cryptonatica affinis (Gmelin, 1791)
- Cryptonatica aleutica (Dall, 1919)
- Cryptonatica andoi (Nomura, 1935)
- Cryptonatica bathybii (Friele, 1879)
- Cryptonatica figurata (G. B. Sowerby III, 1914)
- Cryptonatica hirasei (Pilsbry, 1905)
- Cryptonatica huanghaiensis Zhang, 2008
- Cryptonatica janthostoma (Deshayes, 1839)
- Cryptonatica operculata (Jeffreys, 1885)
- Cryptonatica purpurfunda S.-P. Zhang & P. Wei, 2010
- Cryptonatica ranzii (Kuroda, 1961)
- Cryptonatica russa (Gould, 1859)
- Cryptonatica sphaera S.-P. Zhang & P. Wei, 2010
- Cryptonatica striatica S.-P. Zhang & P. Wei, 2010
- Cryptonatica wakkanaiensis Habe & Ito, 1976
- Cryptonatica zenryumaruae Habe & Ito, 1976

Species brought into synonymy

- Cryptonatica bathybia Golikov & Sirenko, 1988: synonym of Cryptonatica bathybii (Friele, 1879)
- Cryptonatica clausa (Broderip & G. B. Sowerby I, 1829): synonym of Cryptonatica affinis (Gmelin, 1791)
- Cryptonatica janthostomoides (Kuroda & Habe, 1949): synonym of Cryptonatica andoi (Nomura, 1935)
- Cryptonatica salimba Dall, 1919: synonym of Cryptonatica affinis (Gmelin, 1791)
- Cryptonatica septentrionalis Møller, 1842: synonym of Cryptonatica affinis (Gmelin, 1791)
