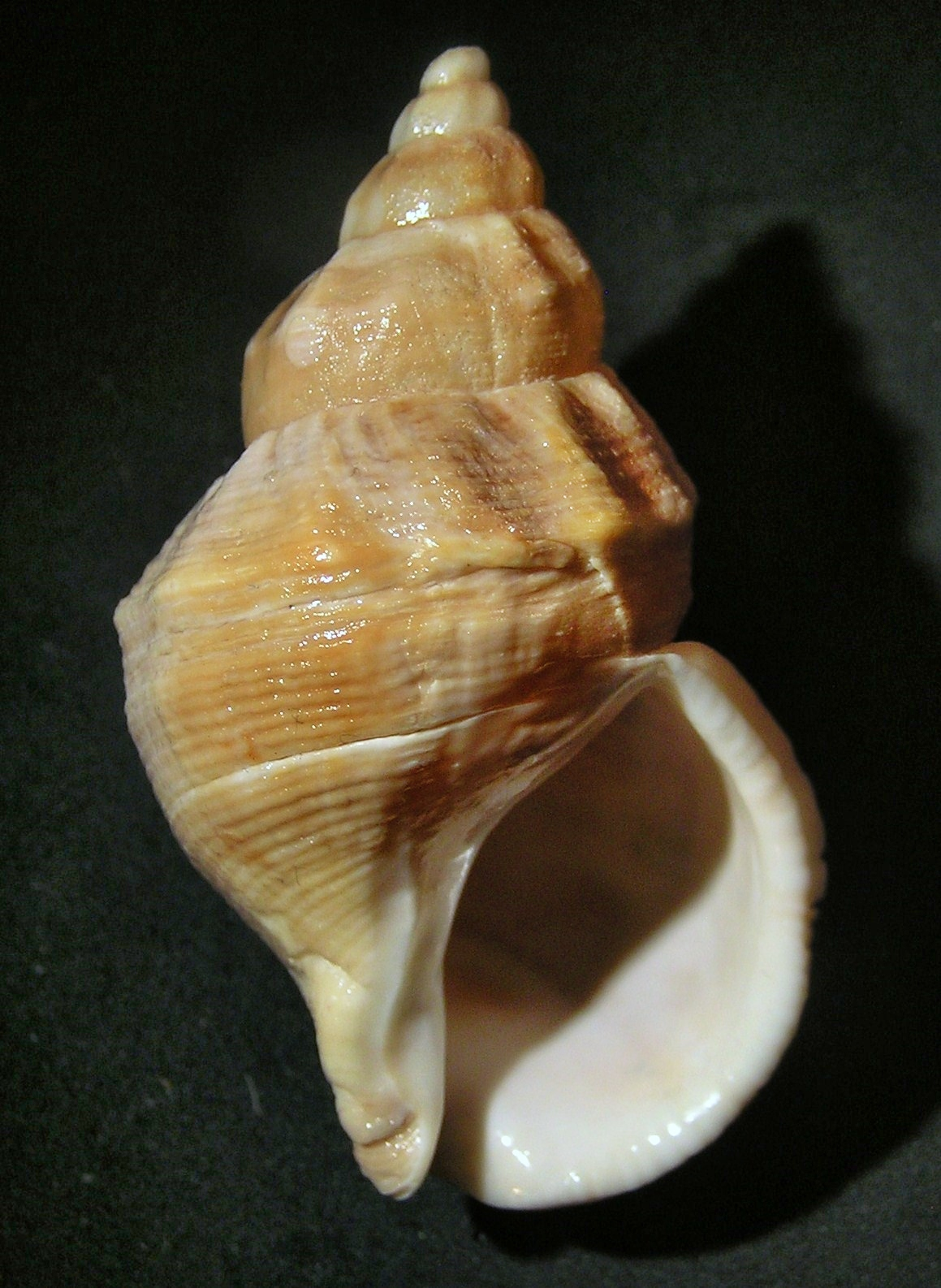

Scientific classification
- Kingdom: Animalia
- Phylum: Mollusca
- Class: Gastropoda
- Subclass: Caenogastropoda
- Order: Neogastropoda
- Family: Buccinidae
- Genus: Buccinum
- Species: B. glaciale

Binomial name
- Buccinum glaciale Linnaeus, 1761

Synonyms
- Buccinum carinatum Phipps, 1774; Buccinum donovani Gray J.E., 1839; Buccinum ekblawi Baker, 1919; Buccinum hancocki Mörch, 1857; Buccinum inclitum Pilsbry, 1904; Buccinum inclytum Pilsbry, 1907 (unjustified emendation of "inclitum"); Buccinum morchianum Dunker, 1858; Buccinum parallelum Dall, 1919; Buccinum richardi Dautzenberg & Fischer H., 1912; Buccinum tubulosum Reeve, 1845; Buccinum turritum Verkrüzen, 1878

= Buccinum glaciale =

Species of gastropod

Buccinum glaciale is a species of sea snail, a marine gastropod mollusk in the family Buccinidae, the true whelks.

== Description ==
The size of the ovate-conical shell reaches 90 mm. The shell is of a reddish fawn color or varies from mauve to brown. It is covered with transverse furrows and shows many sharp, spiral lines. The spire is composed of seven or eight whorls, traversed by thick, noduled folds, somewhat oblique, and much less apparent upon the body whorl, which is encircled by one or two very apparent convex keels, which rarely exist upon the upper whorls. The ovate, cream-colored aperture points upwards and is deeply emarginated at its base. The white, thick outer lip is flaring and turns bac. It is and slightly emarginated at its upper part . The siphonal canal is short. The columella is white and waved.

== Distribution ==
This cold-water species is circum-arctic and can be found in the intertidal zone along Japan, Alaska, the arctic zone of Canada, in European waters (Spitzbergen), in the Northwest Atlantic Ocean.
