= Lacepede =

Lacepede may refer to:

- Bernard Germain de Lacépède (1756–1825), French naturalist and politician
- Lacepede Bay, a bay in South Australia
- Lacépède, Lot-et-Garonne, a commune in France
- Lacepede Islands, a group of four islands off the NW coast of Western Australia
- Kingston District Council, formerly Lacepede District Council, a local government area of South Australia
