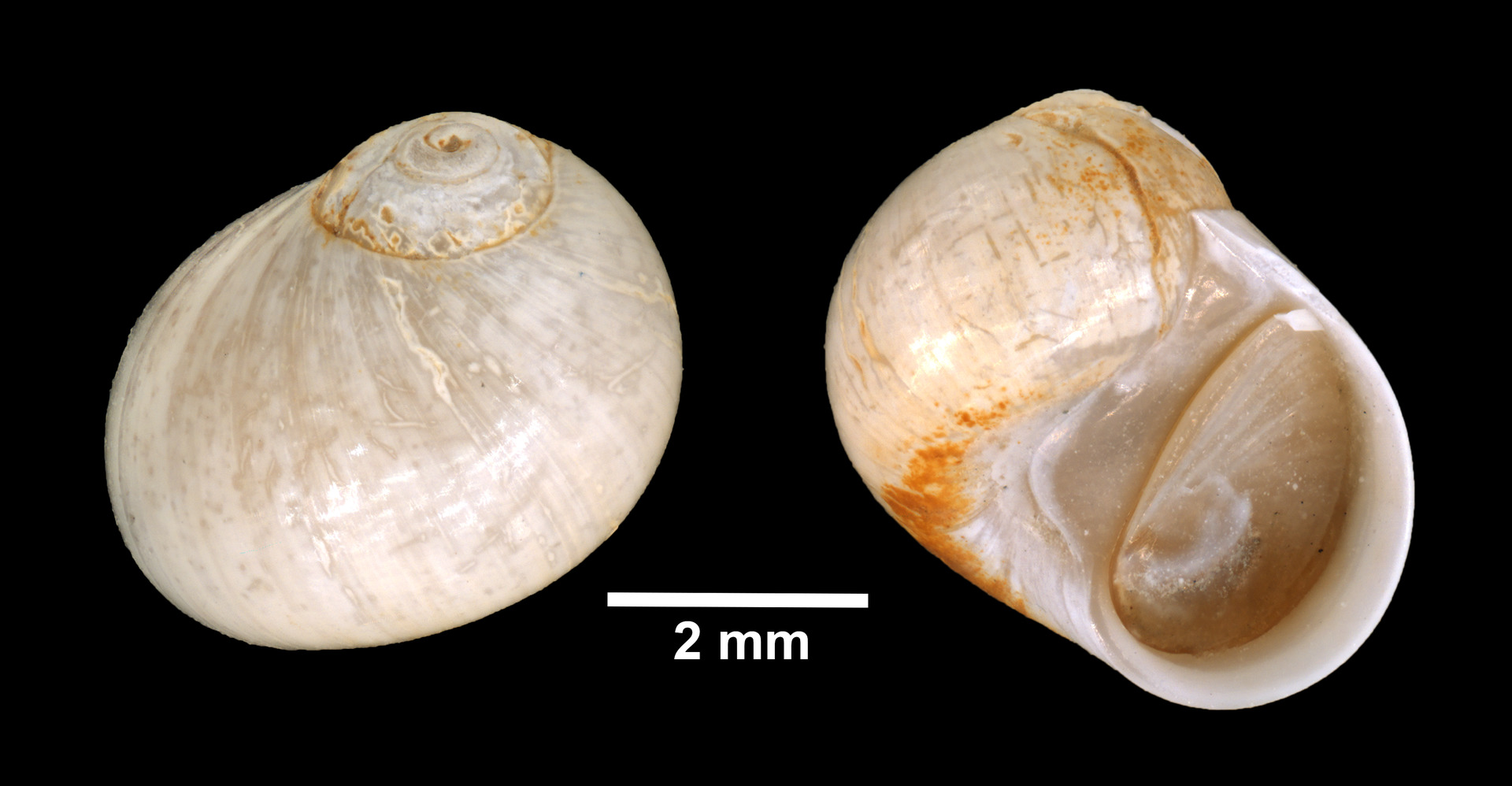

Scientific classification
- Kingdom: Animalia
- Phylum: Mollusca
- Class: Gastropoda
- Subclass: Caenogastropoda
- Order: Littorinimorpha
- Family: Naticidae
- Genus: Tectonatica
- Species: T. pusilla

Binomial name
- Tectonatica pusilla (Say, 1822)

= Tectonatica pusilla =

Species of gastropod

Tectonatica pusilla is a species of predatory sea snail, a marine gastropod mollusk in the family Naticidae, the moon snails.

== Description ==
The maximum recorded shell length is 8 mm.

== Habitat ==
Minimum recorded depth is 0 m. Maximum recorded depth is 130 m.
