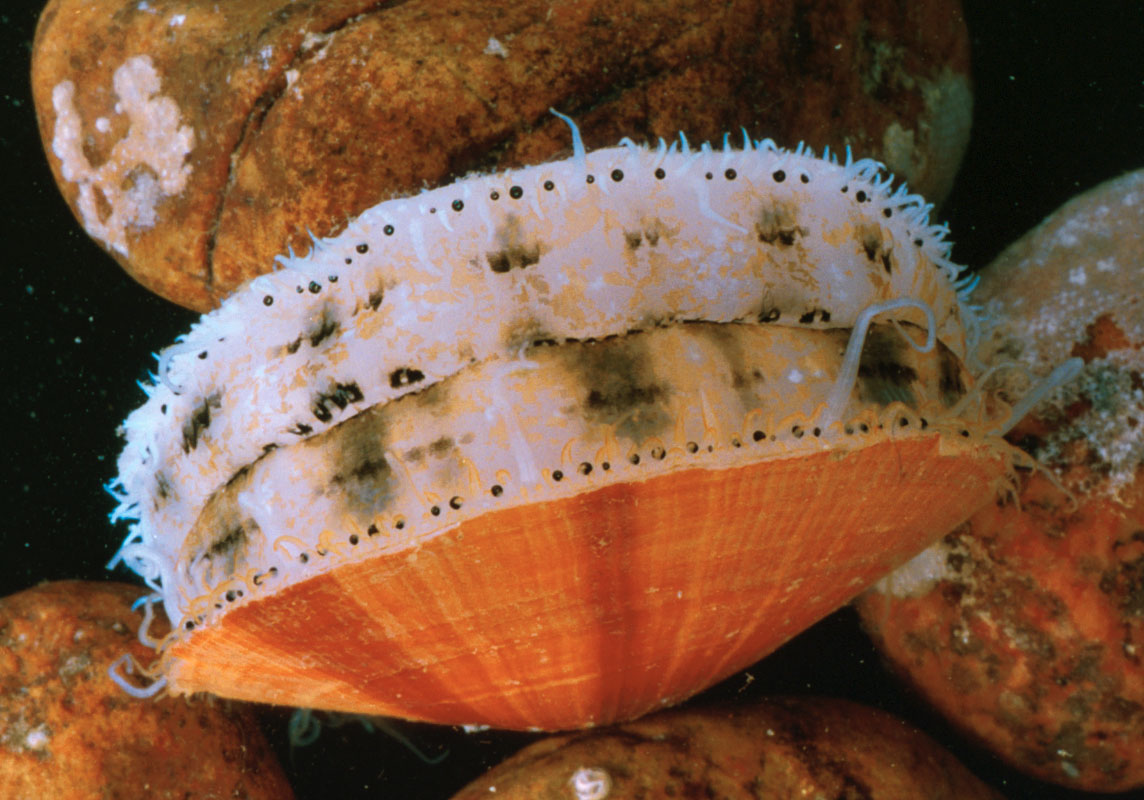
- Placopecten magellanicus

Scientific classification
- Domain: Eukaryota
- Kingdom: Animalia
- Phylum: Mollusca
- Class: Bivalvia
- Order: Pectinida
- Family: Pectinidae
- Genus: Placopecten; Verrill, 1897

= Placopecten =

Genus of bivalves

Placopecten is a genus of scallops, marine bivalve molluscs in the family Pectinidae, the scallops.

== Species ==
Species within the genus Placopecten include:

- Placopecten magellanicus (Gmelin, 1791) — Atlantic deep-sea scallop
