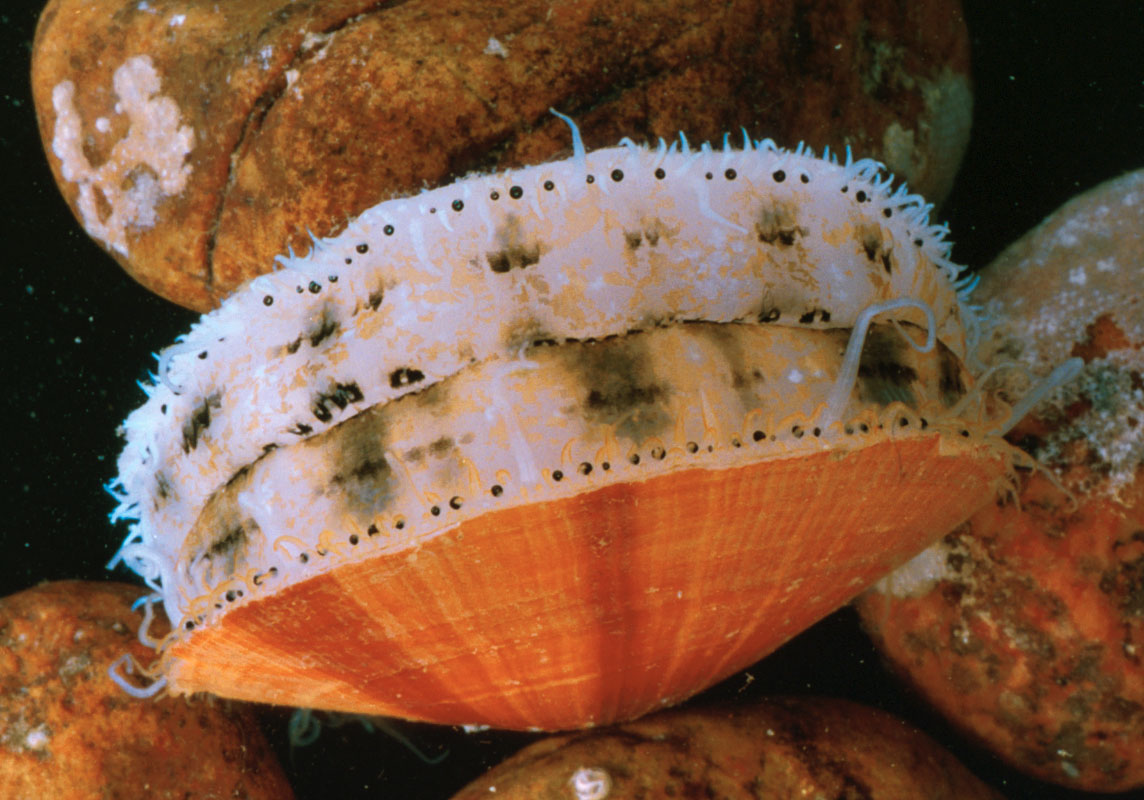

Scientific classification
- Kingdom: Animalia
- Phylum: Mollusca
- Class: Bivalvia
- Order: Pectinida
- Family: Pectinidae
- Genus: Placopecten
- Species: P. magellanicus

Binomial name
- Placopecten magellanicus (Gmelin, 1791)

= Placopecten magellanicus =

Species of bivalve

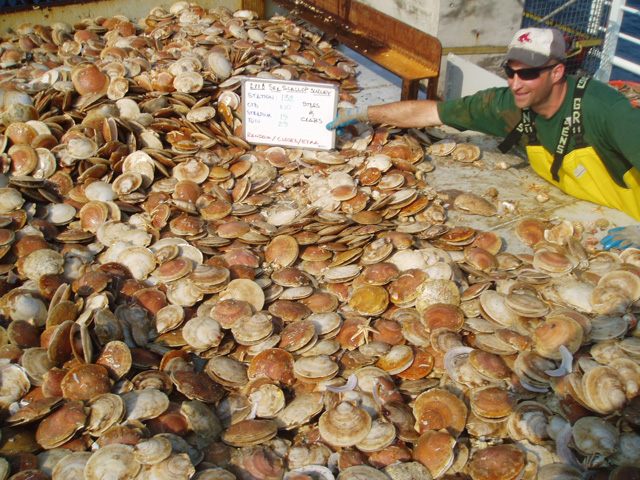
Scallop dredge catch

Placopecten magellanicus, previously listed as Pecten tenuicostatus and Pecten grandis, once referred to as the "giant scallop", and commonly known as the Atlantic deep-sea scallop, deep sea scallop, North Atlantic sea scallop, American sea scallop, Atlantic sea scallop, or sea scallop, is a commercially important pectinid bivalve mollusk native to the northwest Atlantic Ocean.

== Description ==
Neural map

The shell has a classic form, with smooth shell and edges, unlike Pecten maximus (common name the "great scallop" or "king scallop") which has flutes and scalloped edges; size is around 80 millimetres (3 1/4 in), with individuals up to 170 millimetres (6 3/4 in) in diameter. The shell is generally pinkish-red in color, with striped variegation to darker shades appearing in many individuals. The adductor muscle itself is large, often 30–40 millimetres (1 1/4–1 1/2 in) in diameter. Like all scallops, P. magellanicus has photoreceptive eyes along the edge of the pinkish mantle.

== Range and habitat ==
Placopecten magellanicus is found on the continental shelf of the northwest Atlantic from the north shore of the Gulf of St. Lawrence south to Cape Hatteras, North Carolina.

Sea scallops typically occur at depths ranging from 18–110 m, but may also occur in waters as shallow as 2 m in estuaries and embayments along the Maine coast and in Canada. In southern areas, scallops are primarily found at depths between 45 and 75 m, and are less common in shallower water (25–45 m) due to high temperature. Although sea scallops are not common at depths greater than about 110 m, some populations have been found as deep as 384 m, and deep-water populations at 170–180 m have been reported in the Gulf of Maine. Sea scallops often occur in aggregations called beds. Beds may be sporadic (perhaps lasting for a few years) or essentially permanent (e.g., commercial beds supporting the Georges Bank fishery). The highest concentration of many permanent beds appears to correspond to areas of suitable temperatures, food availability, substrate, and where physical oceanographic features such as fronts and gyres may keep larval stages in the vicinity of the spawning population.

Adult sea scallops are generally found on firm sand, gravel, shells, and rock. Other invertebrates associated with scallop beds include sponges, hydroids, anemones, bryozoans, polychaetes, mussels, moon snails, whelks, amphipods, crabs, lobsters, sea stars, sea cucumbers, and tunicates.

== Fishery ==
Global capture production of American sea scallop (Placopecten magellanicus) in thousand tonnes from 1950 to 2022, as reported by the FAO

According to NOAA, the Atlantic sea scallop fishery is healthy, and is harvested at sustainable levels. The federal fishery is managed by NOAA Fisheries and the New England Fishery Management Council. The U.S. Atlantic sea scallop fishery is the largest wild scallop fishery in the world. In 2008, 53.5 million pounds of sea scallop meats worth $370 million were harvested in the United States, with Massachusetts and New Jersey responsible for the majority. In 2018, 58.2 million pounds of sea scallop meats worth $532.9 million were harvested in the United States with Massachusetts responsible for the majority.

Between the 1960s and the mid-1990s, the U.S. federal Atlantic sea scallop fishery declined steadily. In 1994 a new set of management guidelines were implemented including a moratorium on permits, limited days at sea, gear and crew restrictions, and areas closed to fishing. Between 1994 and 2005, the biomass of the U.S. sea scallop population increased by 18-fold on Georges Bank and by 8-fold in the Mid-Atlantic Bight region.

The state of Maine has an inshore (within 3 miles) winter (December - April) scallop fishery that is managed by the Maine Department of Marine Resources. Scallops in Maine inshore waters are harvested by mechanical draggers or by SCUBA divers ("dive caught"). In 2009 low harvest numbers caused the Department of Marine Resources to cut the season short and proposed a series of management measures. Entry to the fishery became limited, the season was reduced to 70 days, and the minimum ring size was increased to four inches. Additionally, 13 conservation closures (~20% of coastal Maine waters) were created for the following three fishing seasons. In 2012, the Department of Marine Resources proposed developing a rotational closure system for the fishery, based on a 10-year schedule. This rotational closure system was adopted only in the Zone 2 region of the state fishery. All three zones have different management tools that include limited access areas and in-season targeted closures. Since 2009, both dollar value and landings have gone up for the sea scallop fishery in the state of Maine.

The Monterey Bay Aquarium Seafood Watch lists sea scallops as a "Good Alternative," its second best rating. Greenpeace red listed the Atlantic sea scallop, stating that scallop stocks are being overfished and that the fishing methods used are destroying corals and sponges. According to Greenpeace the fishery of scallops kills nearly 1,000 loggerhead sea turtles every year. Since 2015, chain mats and Turtle Deflector Dredges (TDDs) have been added to offshore equipment to reduce sea turtle deaths. This has caused a significant reduction in sea turtles getting caught in harvesting gear.
