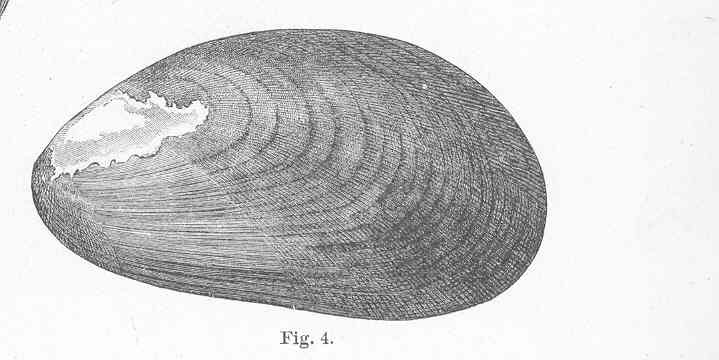
- Musculus niger – little black mussel

Scientific classification
- Domain: Eukaryota
- Kingdom: Animalia
- Phylum: Mollusca
- Class: Bivalvia
- Order: Mytilida
- Family: Mytilidae
- Genus: Musculus; Röding, 1798

Synonyms
- Lanistes Swainson, 1840; Lanistina Gray, 1847; Modiolarca J. E. Gray, 1842; Modiolaria Lovén, 1846; Ryenella C. A. Fleming, 1959

= Musculus (bivalve) =

Musculus Temporal range: Middle Jurassic–present, 170.3–0 Ma

Genus of bivalves

Musculus is a genus of mussels in the family Mytilidae.

== Species ==
There are 30 extant species:

- Musculus alganus Laseron, 1956
- Musculus aviarius Dall, Bartsch & Rehder, 1938
- Musculus calceatus (Melvill & Standen, 1907)
- Musculus coenobitus (Vaillant, 1865)
- Musculus concinnus (Dunker, 1857)
- Musculus costulatus (Risso, 1826)
- Musculus cumingianus (Reeve, 1857)
- Musculus cupreus (A. Gould, 1861)
- Musculus discors (Linnaeus, 1767) – discord mussel
- Musculus glacialis (Leche, 1883)
- Musculus impactus (Hermann, 1782)
- Musculus imus (Bartsch, 1915)
- Musculus koreanus Ockelmann, 1983
- Musculus lateralis (Say, 1822) – lateral mussel
- Musculus minutus Scarlato, 1960
- Musculus nana (Dunker, 1857)
- Musculus nanulus Thiele, 1930
- Musculus niger (J. E. Gray, 1824) – little black mussel
- Musculus nipponicus Okutani, 2005
- Musculus panhai Moolenbeek, 2009
- Musculus phenax Dall, 1915
- Musculus pusio (A. Adams, 1862)
- Musculus pygmaeus Glynn, 1964
- Musculus semiradiatus (Verco, 1908)
- Musculus strigatus (Hanley, 1843)
- Musculus subpictus (Cantraine, 1835)
- Musculus taylori (Dall, 1897)
- Musculus varicosus (A. Gould, 1861)
- Musculus viator (A. d'Orbigny, 1842)
- Musculus viridulus (H. Adams, 1871)

There are also a large number of species only know from the fossil record, including the following:

- †Musculus somaliensis Cox, 1935

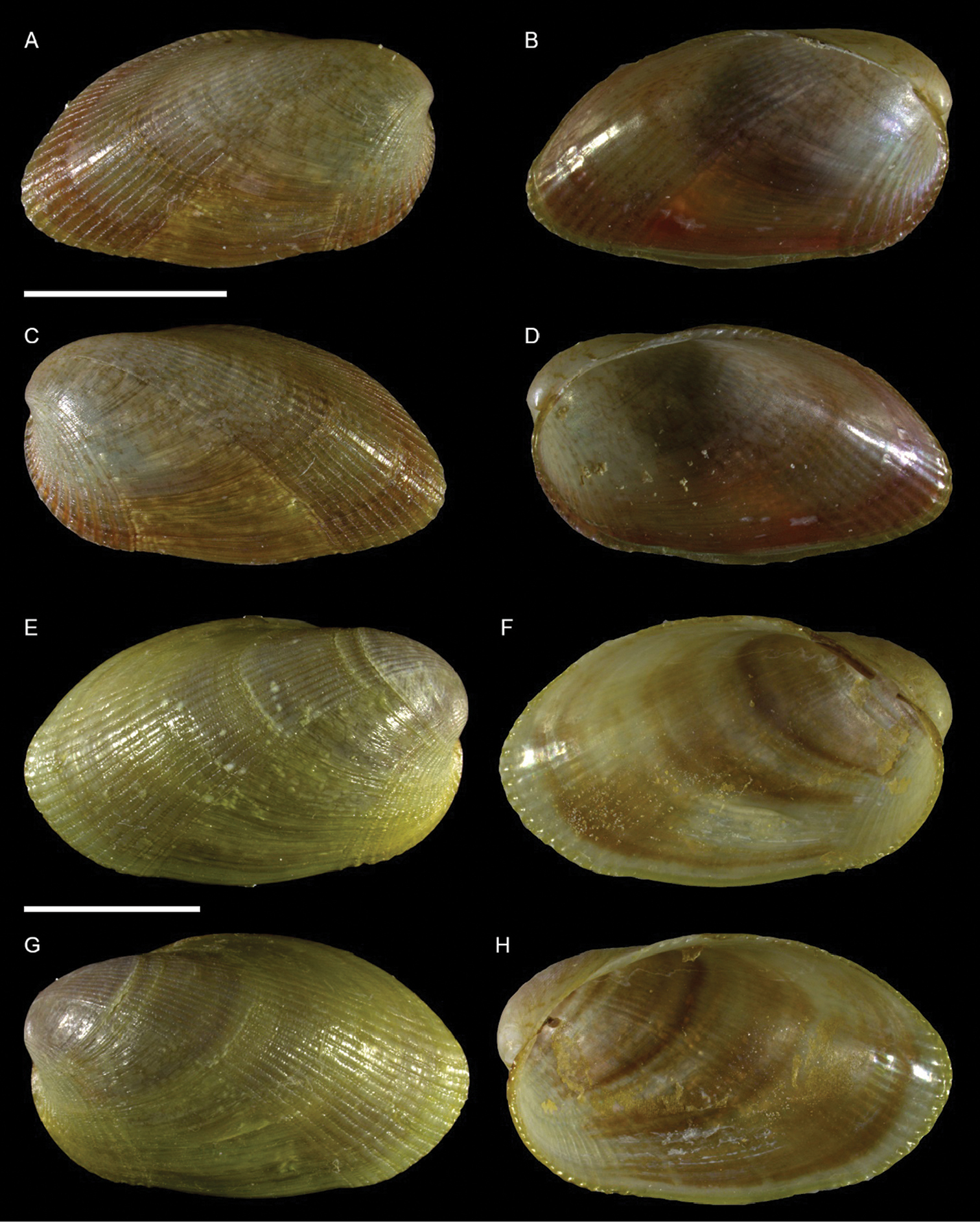
Musculus subpictus
