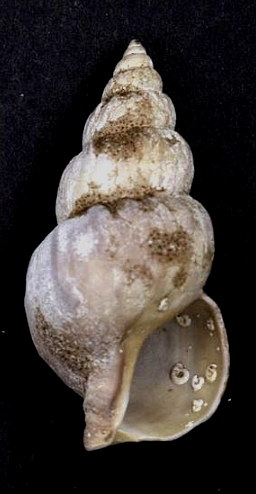
- Apertural view of a shell of Buccinum scalariforme (museum specimen at Naturalis Biodiversity Center)

Scientific classification
- Kingdom: Animalia
- Phylum: Mollusca
- Class: Gastropoda
- Subclass: Caenogastropoda
- Order: Neogastropoda
- Family: Buccinidae
- Genus: Buccinum
- Species: B. scalariforme

Binomial name
- Buccinum scalariforme Møller, 1842

Synonyms
- Buccinum elatior (Middendorff, 1849); Buccinum tenue Gray, 1839 (invalid: junior homonym of Buccinum tenue Schröter, 1805); Buccinum tenue f. elatior (Middendorff, 1849); Buccinum tenue var. lyperum Dall, 1919; Buccinum tenue var. rhodium Dall, 1919; Tritonium (Buccinum) tenue (Gray J.E., 1839); Tritonium (Buccinum) tenue f. elatior Middendorff, 1849; Tritonium (Buccinum) tenue f. normalis Middendorf, 1849 (infrasubspecific)

= Buccinum scalariforme =

Species of gastropod

Buccinum scalariforme, common name the silky buccinum, is a species of sea snail, a marine gastropod mollusk in the family Buccinidae, the true whelks.

== Nomenclature ==
The name Buccinum scalariforme Møller, 1842, is a junior homonym of Buccinum scalariforme Kiener, 1834. However, the latter has not been used as the valid name of a valid species after 1899, whereas Buccinum scalariforme Møller, 1842, can be declared a nomen protectum under Art. 23.9 of the Code. WoRMS maintains this prevailing usage until such nomenclatural act is published.

== Description ==
The ovate shell is elongated, slightly turreted and pointed at the summit. The spire is composed of seven very convex rounded whorls, united by a shallow suture. Upon the whorls are regularly disposed longitudinal ribs or folds, crossed by numerous, fine, approximate striae, which, by their mutual intersection, cover the surface of the shell. The white aperture is slightly rounded. The thin outer lip is striated internally. The columella is arcuated and is covered by the inner lip. The coloring is whitish, sometimes ornamented with transverse bands.

== Distribution ==
This species occurs in the North Atlantic Ocean; off Canada; in circum-arctic waters.
