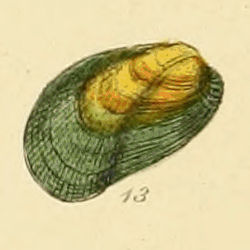

Scientific classification
- Kingdom: Animalia
- Phylum: Mollusca
- Class: Bivalvia
- Order: Mytilida
- Family: Mytilidae
- Genus: Musculus
- Species: M. discors

Binomial name
- Musculus discors (Linnaeus, 1767)

= Musculus discors =

Species of bivalve

Musculus discors, or the discord mussel, is a species of bivalve mollusc in the family Mytilidae. It can be found along the Atlantic coast. In North America it ranges from Labrador to Long Island Sound, around Alaska and in northern European waters, including around most of the coast of Britain. It is a global IUCN Red List species, and of national conservation importance within Great Britain.
