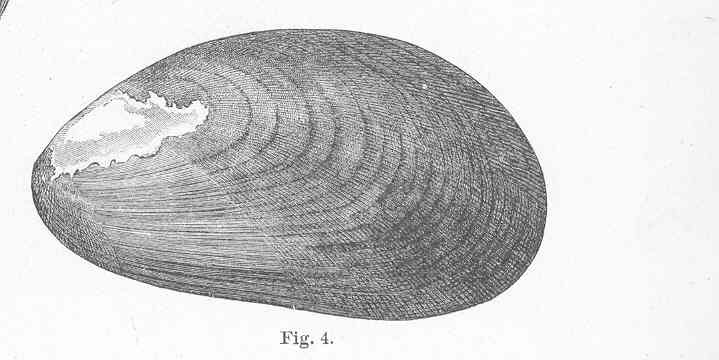

Scientific classification
- Kingdom: Animalia
- Phylum: Mollusca
- Class: Bivalvia
- Order: Mytilida
- Family: Mytilidae
- Genus: Musculus
- Species: M. niger

Binomial name
- Musculus niger (Gray, 1824)

= Musculus niger =

Species of bivalve

Musculus niger, or the black mussel, is a species of bivalve mollusc in the family Mytilidae. It can be found in the Atlantic Ocean, eastern Pacific Ocean, and the Arctic Ocean. Along the Atlantic coast of North America, it ranges from the Arctic Ocean to North Carolina.
