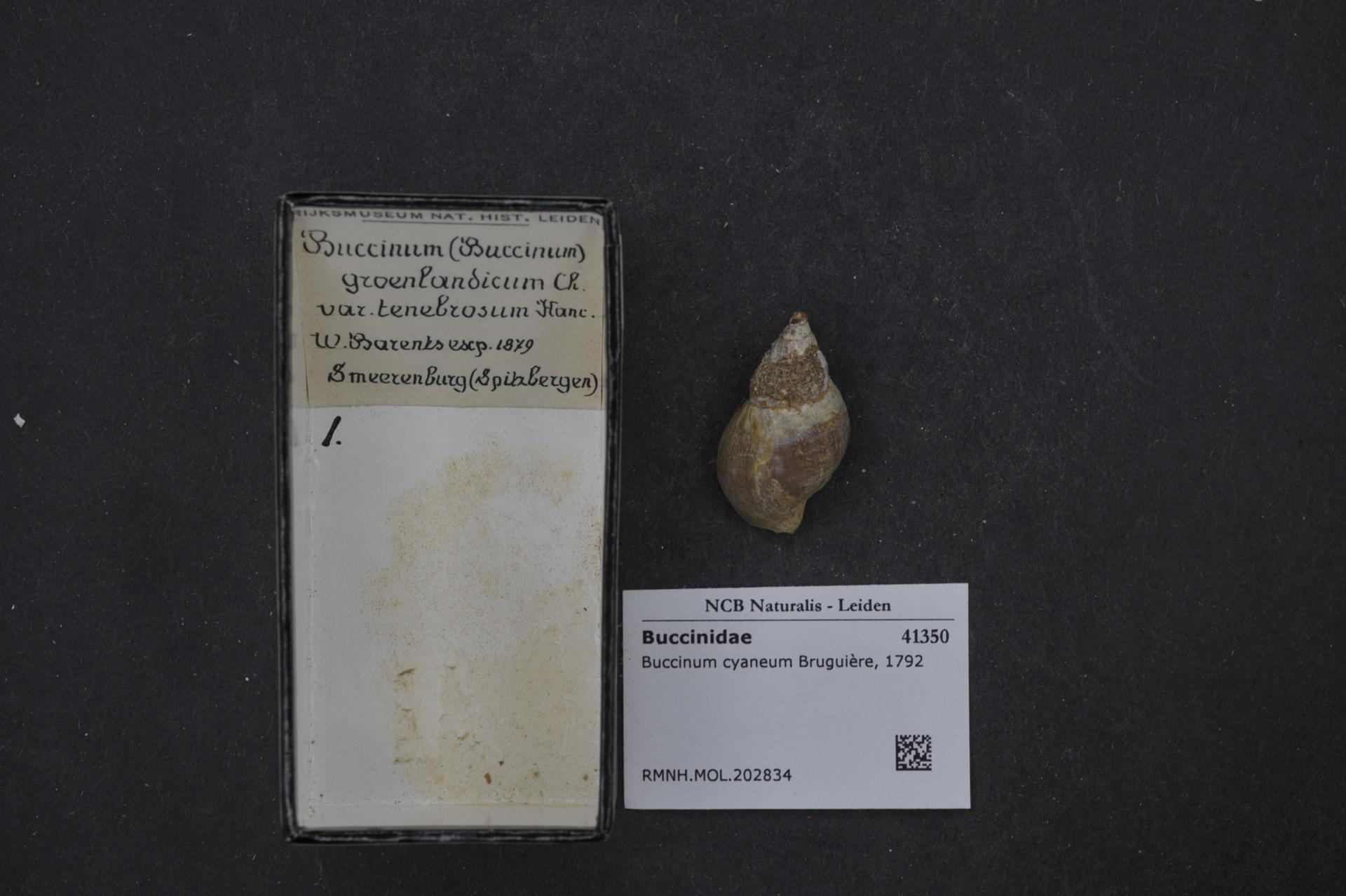

Scientific classification
- Kingdom: Animalia
- Phylum: Mollusca
- Class: Gastropoda
- Subclass: Caenogastropoda
- Order: Neogastropoda
- Family: Buccinidae
- Genus: Buccinum
- Species: B. cyaneum

Binomial name
- Buccinum cyaneum Bruguière, 1792

Synonyms
- Buccinum cyaneum cyaneum Bruguière, 1792; Buccinum cyaneum patulum G. O. Sars, 1878; Buccinum gouldii A. E. Verrill, 1882; Buccinum tenebrosum Hancock, 1846

= Buccinum cyaneum =

Species of gastropod

Buccinum cyaneum is a species of sea snail, a marine gastropod mollusk in the family Buccinidae, the true whelks.
