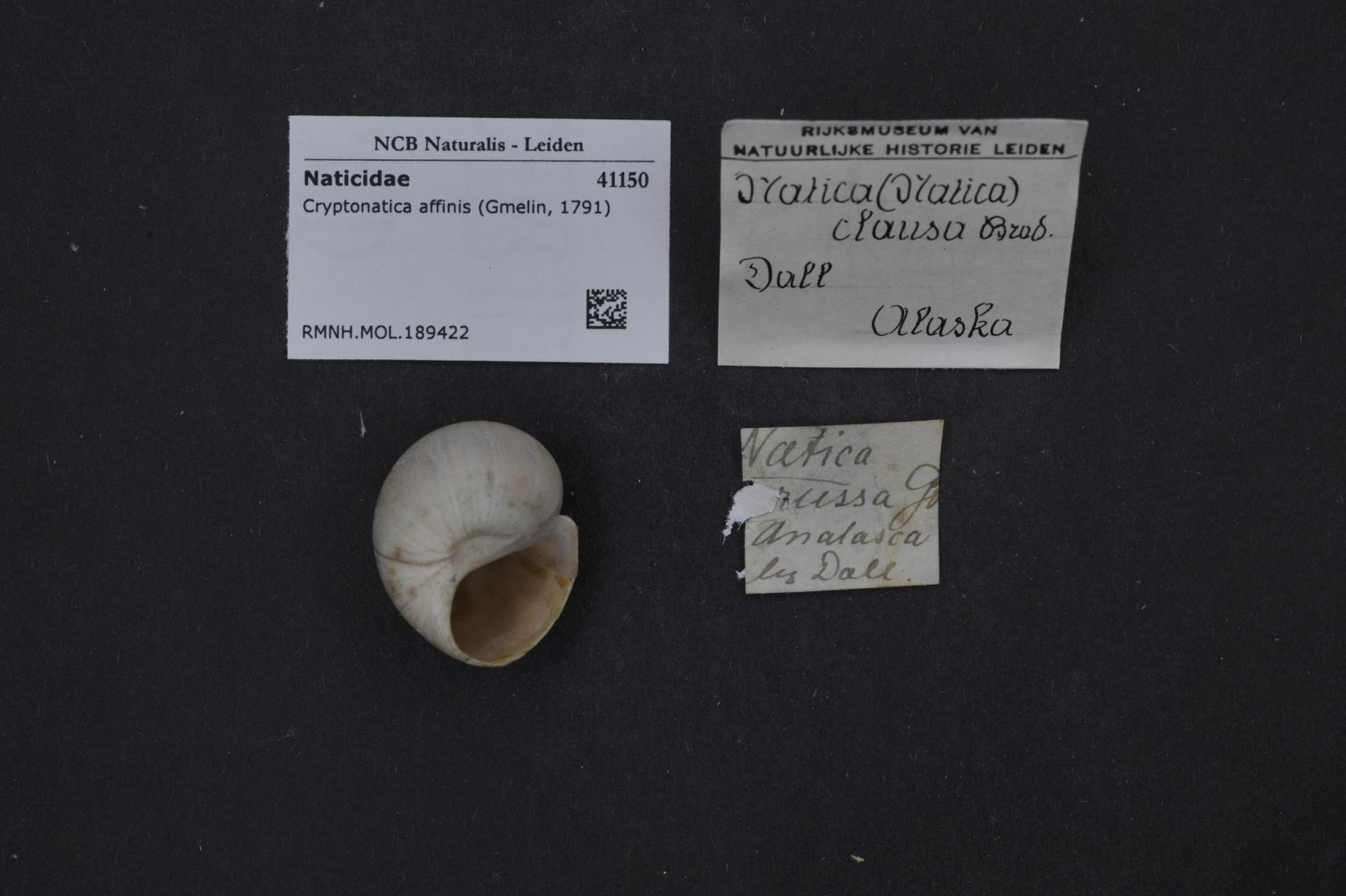

Scientific classification
- Kingdom: Animalia
- Phylum: Mollusca
- Class: Gastropoda
- Subclass: Caenogastropoda
- Order: Littorinimorpha
- Family: Naticidae
- Genus: Cryptonatica
- Species: C. affinis

Binomial name
- Cryptonatica affinis (Gmelin, 1791)

Synonyms
- Cryptonatica clausa; Cryptonatica septentrionalis; Natica clausa Broderip & G. B. Sowerby I, 1829; Natica russa Gould, 1859

= Cryptonatica affinis =

Species of gastropod

Cryptonatica affinis, common name the Arctic moonsnail, is a species of predatory sea snail, a marine gastropod mollusc in the family Naticidae, the moon snails.

== Description ==
The maximum recorded shell length is 37 mm.

== Habitat ==
Minimum recorded depth is 0 m. Maximum recorded depth is 2811 m.
