= Nucula atacellana =

Scientific classification
- Kingdom: Animalia
- Phylum: Mollusca
- Class: Bivalvia
- Order: Nuculida
- Family: Nuculidae
- Genus: Nucula
- Species: N. atacellana

Binomial name
- Nucula atacellana Schenck, 1939

Species of bivalve

Nucula atacellana, or the cancellate nut shell clam, is a marine bivalve mollusc in the family Nuculidae. It can be found along the Atlantic coast of North America, ranging from Cape Cod to Virginia.
