= Nucula nitidulaformis =

Scientific classification
- Kingdom: Animalia
- Phylum: Mollusca
- Class: Bivalvia
- Order: Nuculida
- Family: Nuculidae
- Genus: Nucula
- Species: N. nitidulaformis

Binomial name
- Nucula nitidulaformis Powell, 1971

Species of bivalve

Nucula nitidulaformis is a saltwater nut clam, a marine bivalve mollusc in the family Nuculidae.
