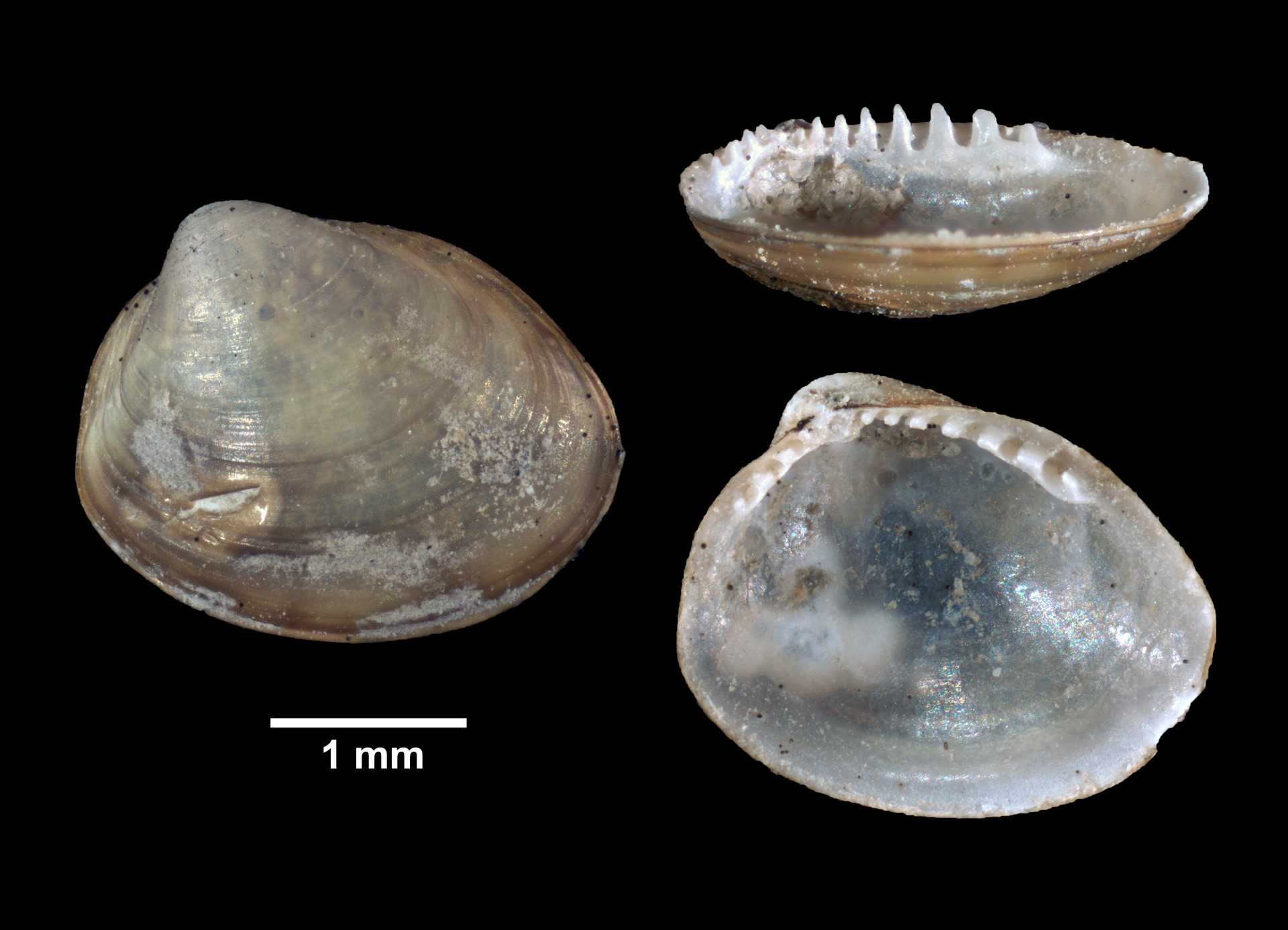

Scientific classification
- Kingdom: Animalia
- Phylum: Mollusca
- Class: Bivalvia
- Order: Nuculida
- Family: Nuculidae
- Genus: Nucula
- Species: N. delphinodonta

Binomial name
- Nucula delphinodonta Mighels & Adams, 1842

= Nucula delphinodonta =

Species of bivalve

Nucula delphinodonta, or the dolphin-tooth nut shell clam, is a marine bivalve mollusc in the family Nuculidae described by J.W. Mighels and C.B Adams in 1842. It can be found along the Atlantic coast of North America, ranging from Labrador to Maryland.
