= Nucula tenuis =

Scientific classification
- Kingdom: Animalia
- Phylum: Mollusca
- Class: Bivalvia
- Order: Nuculida
- Family: Nuculidae
- Genus: Nucula
- Species: N. tenuis

Binomial name
- Nucula tenuis Montagu, 1808

Species of bivalve

Nucula tenuis, or the smooth nut clam, is a marine bivalve mollusc in the family Nuculidae. It can be found along the Atlantic coast of North America, ranging from Labrador to Maryland.
