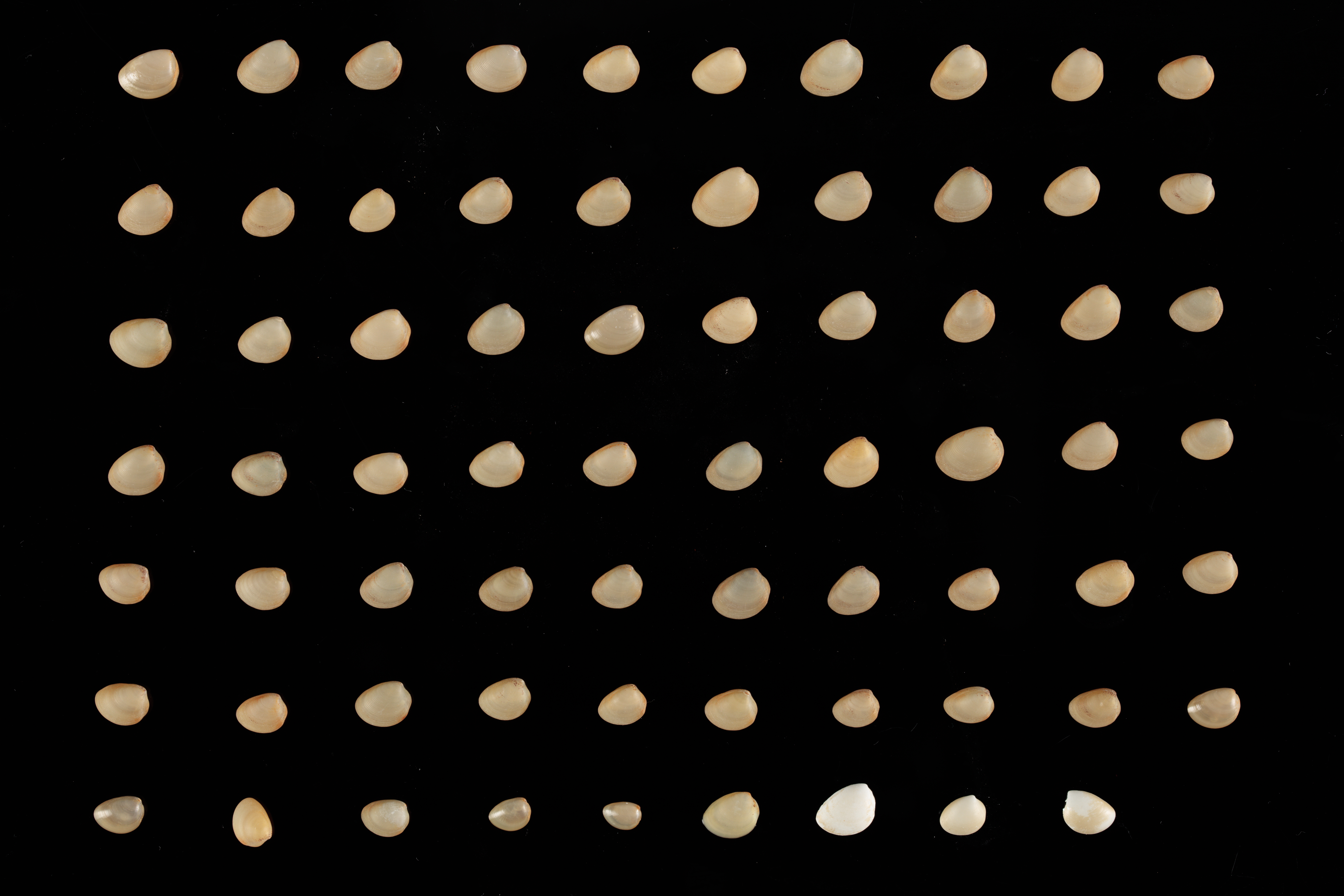
- Nucula nitidula

Scientific classification
- Kingdom: Animalia
- Phylum: Mollusca
- Class: Bivalvia
- Order: Nuculida
- Family: Nuculidae
- Genus: Nucula
- Species: N. nitidula

Binomial name
- Nucula nitidula A. Adams, 1856

Synonyms
- Nucula castanea A. Adams, 1856

= Nucula nitidula =

Species of bivalve

Nucula nitidula is a saltwater nut clam, a marine bivalve mollusc in the family Nuculidae.
