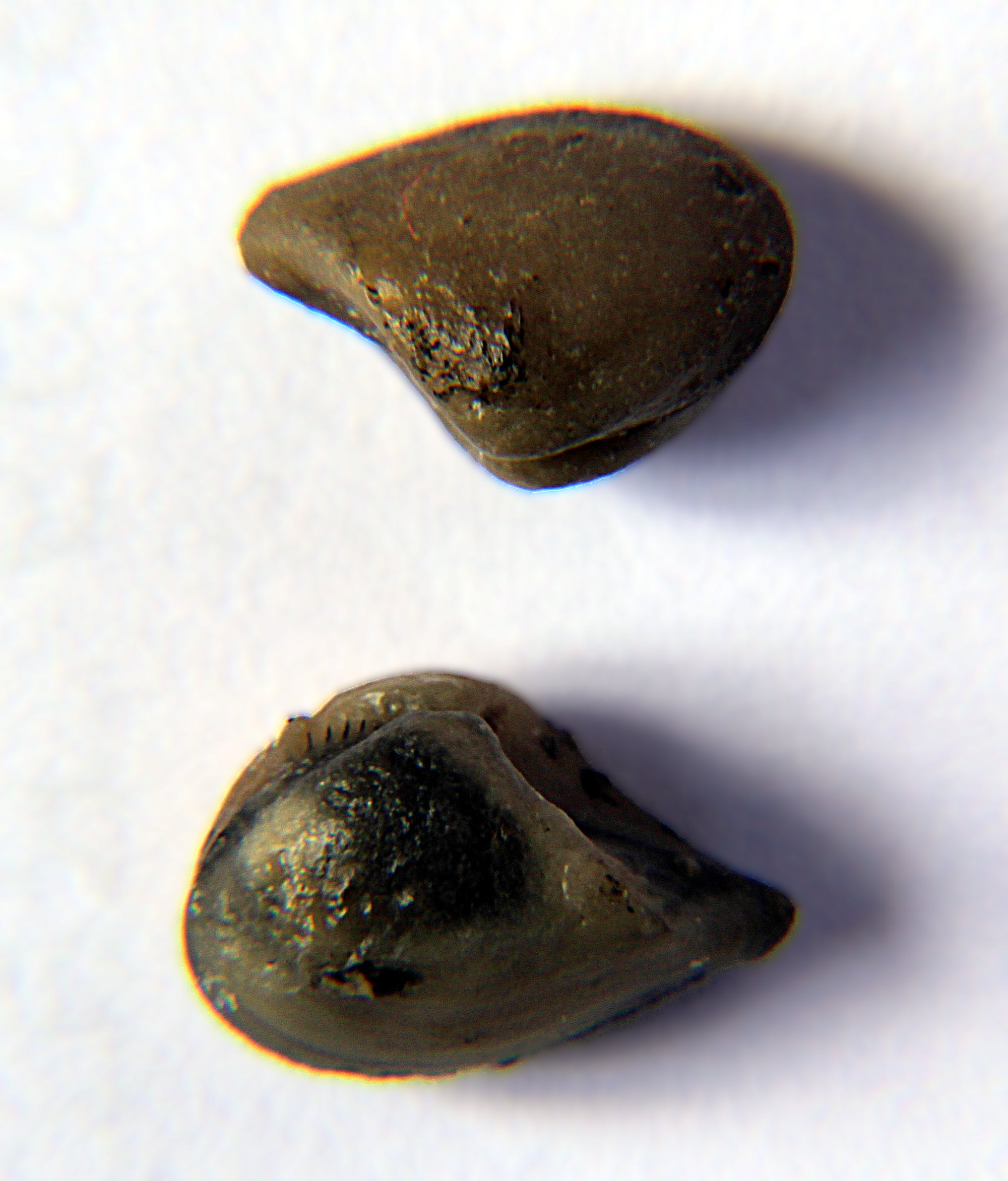
- Two entire shells of Dacryomya lacryma

Scientific classification
- Kingdom: Animalia
- Phylum: Mollusca
- Class: Bivalvia
- Order: Nuculida
- Family: Nuculidae
- Genus: †Dacryomya; Agassiz, 1840

Species
- †Dacryomya diana (A. d'Orbigny, 1850); †Dacryomya gaveyi (L. R. Cox, 1960); †Dacryomya lacryma (J. De C. Sowerby, 1824)

Synonyms
- †Nuculana (Dacryomya) Agassiz, 1840 superseded rank

= Dacryomya =

Dacryomya Temporal range: Lower/Middle Jurassic

Extinct genus of bivalves

Dacryomya, or the pointed nutclam is an extinct genus of small-sized (approximately 1 centimetre (0.39 in) long) saltwater clams, marine bivalve molluscs in the nutclam family Nuculanidae. The size and shape of the shells of species in this genus are reminiscent of broad apple pips.

== Distribution ==
Dacryomya lived during the Lower and Middle Jurassic, possibly throughout the Tethys Faunal Province. Fossils of D. lacryma are known from the very late Lower Jurassic (Toarcian) of France (Causes, 44.3° N, 3.3° E); the early middle Middle Jurassic (Bajocian) of Germany (Sengenthal); and the very late Middle Jurassic (Callovian) of India (the Gadhada Sandstone Member and the Chari Formation, 23.5° N, 70.5° E).

== Habitat ==
The fossil locations cited were open shallow subtidal areas, where this mollusc lived as a facultatively mobile infaunal deposit feeder-suspension feeder.

== Other views ==
These additional views of the two shells of Dacromya lacryma give more information about the overall shape of the shell in that species:

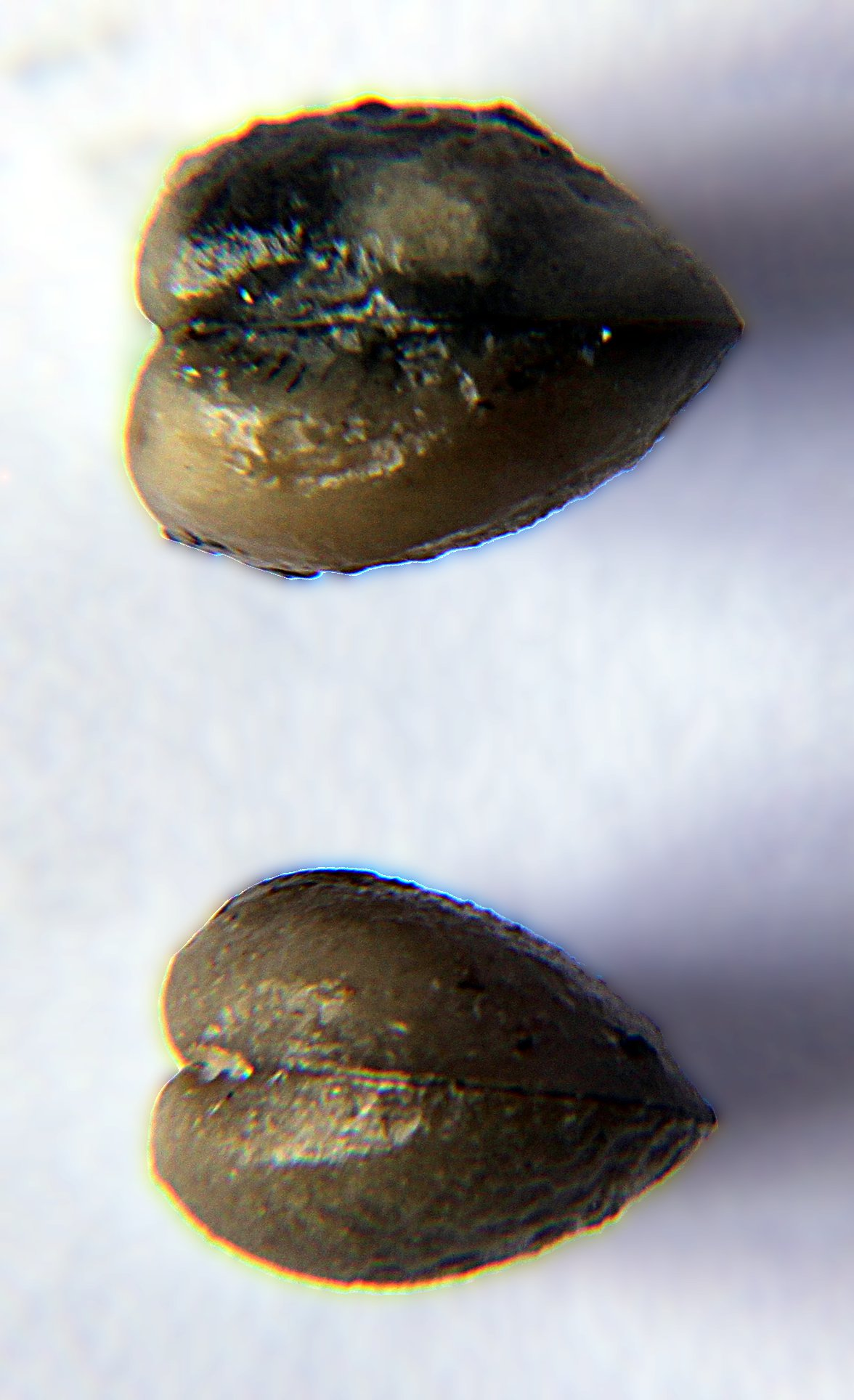

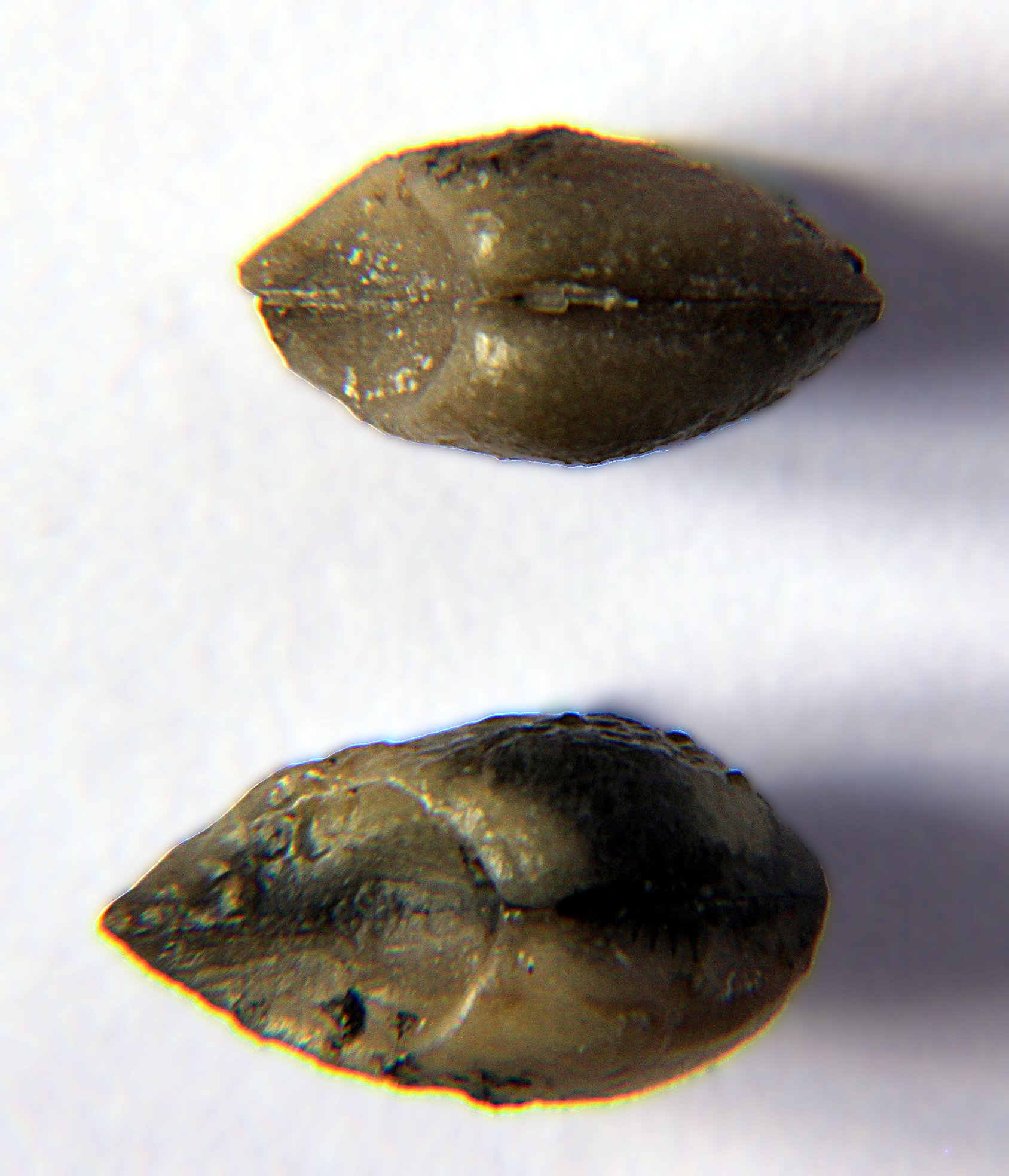

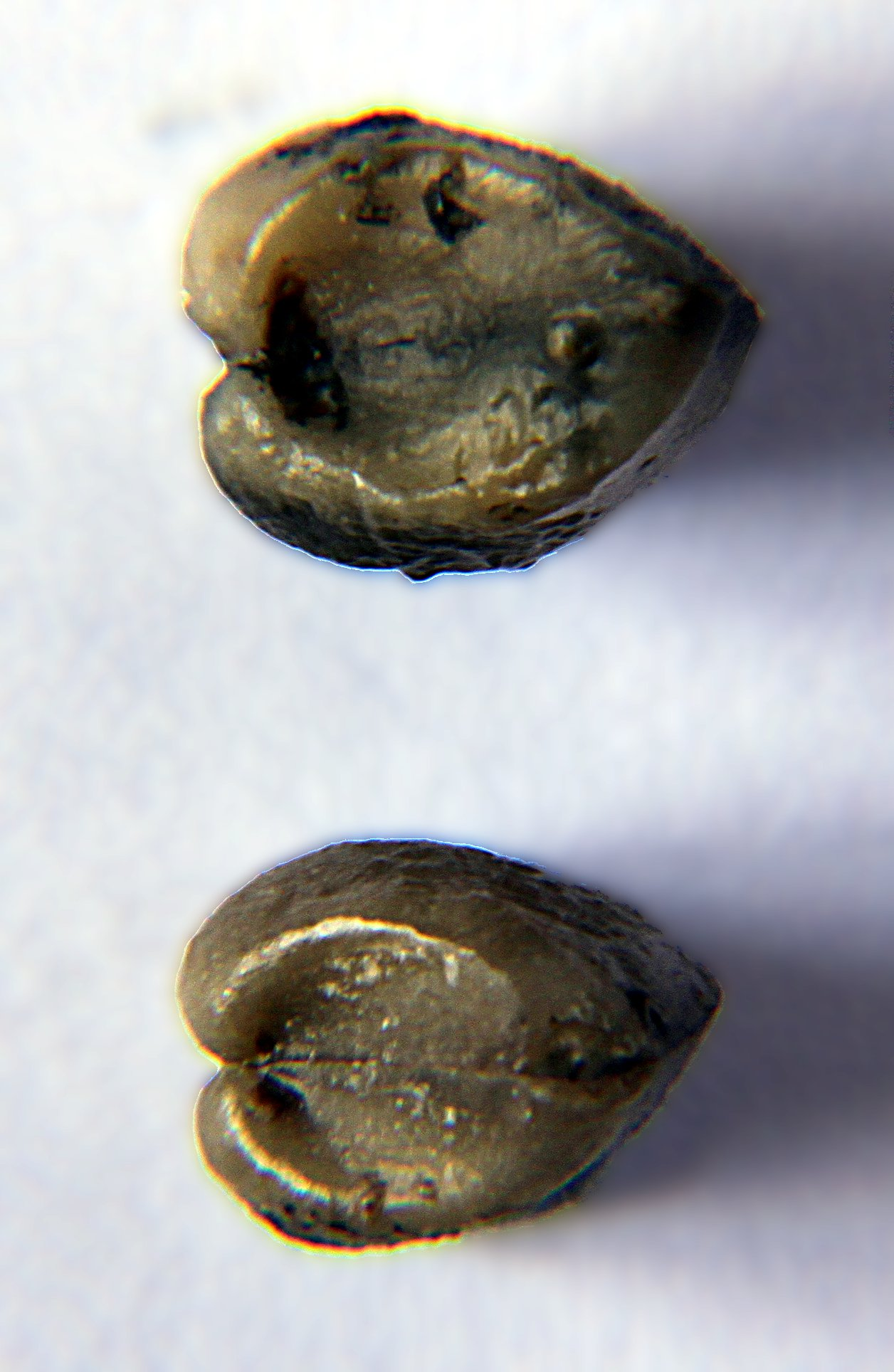
