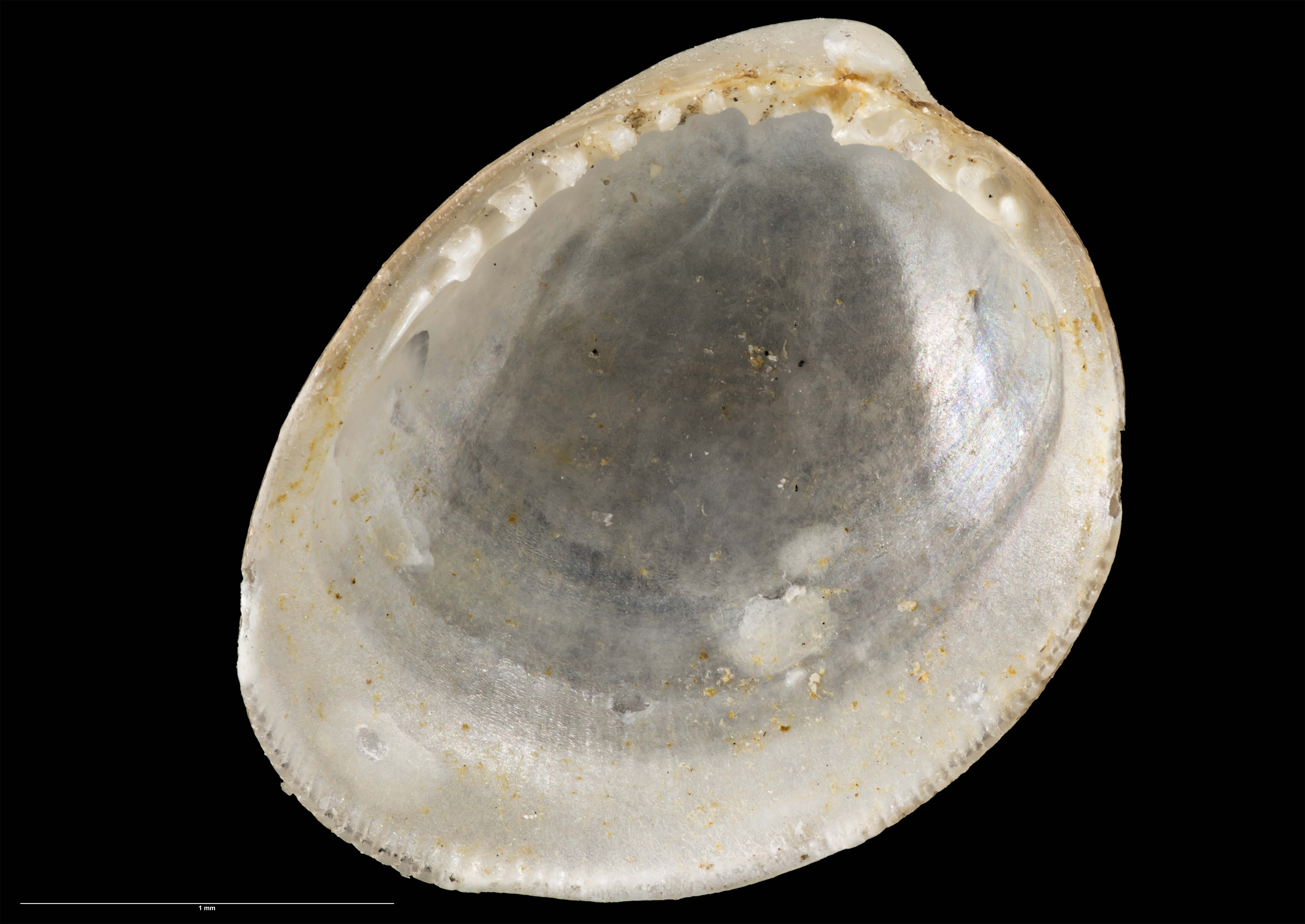

Scientific classification
- Kingdom: Animalia
- Phylum: Mollusca
- Class: Bivalvia
- Order: Nuculida
- Family: Nuculidae
- Genus: Nucula
- Species: N. rossiana

Binomial name
- Nucula rossiana Finlay, 1930

= Nucula rossiana =

Species of bivalve

Nucula rossiana is a saltwater nut clam, a marine bivalve mollusc in the family Nuculidae.
