= Nucula recens =

Scientific classification
- Kingdom: Animalia
- Phylum: Mollusca
- Class: Bivalvia
- Order: Nuculida
- Family: Nuculidae
- Genus: Nucula
- Species: N. recens

Binomial name
- Nucula recens Dell, 1956

Synonyms
- Linucula recens Dell, 1956

Species of bivalve

Nucula recens is a saltwater nut clam, a marine bivalve mollusc in the family Nuculidae.
