= Condylonucula maya =

Scientific classification
- Kingdom: Animalia
- Phylum: Mollusca
- Class: Bivalvia
- Order: Nuculida
- Family: Nuculidae
- Genus: Condylonucula
- Species: C. maya

Binomial name
- Condylonucula maya D.R. Moore, 1977

Species of bivalve

Condylonucula maya is a tiny species of saltwater clam, a marine bivalve mollusk or micromollusk in the family Nuculidae, the nut clams. This species grows to a length of about 500 μm (0.020 in) and is believed to be the smallest living bivalve. It is found in shallow waters in the Caribbean Sea off the coast of Mexico. It is categorized as a detritus feeder, and the outer appearance is extremely small in diameter, with a solid structure and exoskeleton.

== See also ==
- Smallest organisms
