= Ennucula aegeensis =

Ennucula aegeensis Temporal range: 1.7–0 Ma

Scientific classification
- Domain: Eukaryota
- Kingdom: Animalia
- Phylum: Mollusca
- Class: Bivalvia
- Order: Nuculida
- Family: Nuculidae
- Genus: Ennucula
- Species: E. aegeensis

Binomial name
- Ennucula aegeensis (Forbes, 1844)

Synonyms
- Nucula aegeensis; Nucula convexa; Nucula macandrewi; Nucula mandraei; Nucula m'andrewii

Species of mollusc

Ennucula aegeensis, commonly known as the Aegean nut clam, is a nut clam present in the Atlantic Ocean, Gulf of Mexico, and the Mediterranean.

== Distribution ==
Ennucula aegeensis is present of the coast of Florida, North Carolina, West Indies, Gulf of Mexico, and the Mediterranean (Marmara, Aegean, and Levantine Sea). E. aegeensis in the Mediterranean is typically found 80–500 m under the sea, its lower limit is around 1000 m. However, under 500–600 m it is usual replaced by E. corbuloides. E. aegeensis occupies muddy sandy-bottoms. E. aegeensis fossils have been found near the islet of Sokastro dating back to the early Calabrian (1.7-1.6 Ma).

== Description ==
Ennucula aegeensis has an obliquely oval, white, shell. That has fine conmarginal striae on the exterior, the interior as radially ribbed structures that appear as fine radial striations. The interior margins are minutely denticulate. They are typically 3 mm in length. They are endobenthic (living within seafloor sediment) and are deposit feeders who consume refractory material.
