= Nucula gallinacea =

Scientific classification
- Kingdom: Animalia
- Phylum: Mollusca
- Class: Bivalvia
- Order: Nuculida
- Family: Nuculidae
- Genus: Nucula
- Species: N. gallinacea

Binomial name
- Nucula gallinacea Finlay, 1930

Species of bivalve

Nucula gallinacea is a saltwater nut clam, a marine bivalve mollusc in the family Nuculidae.
