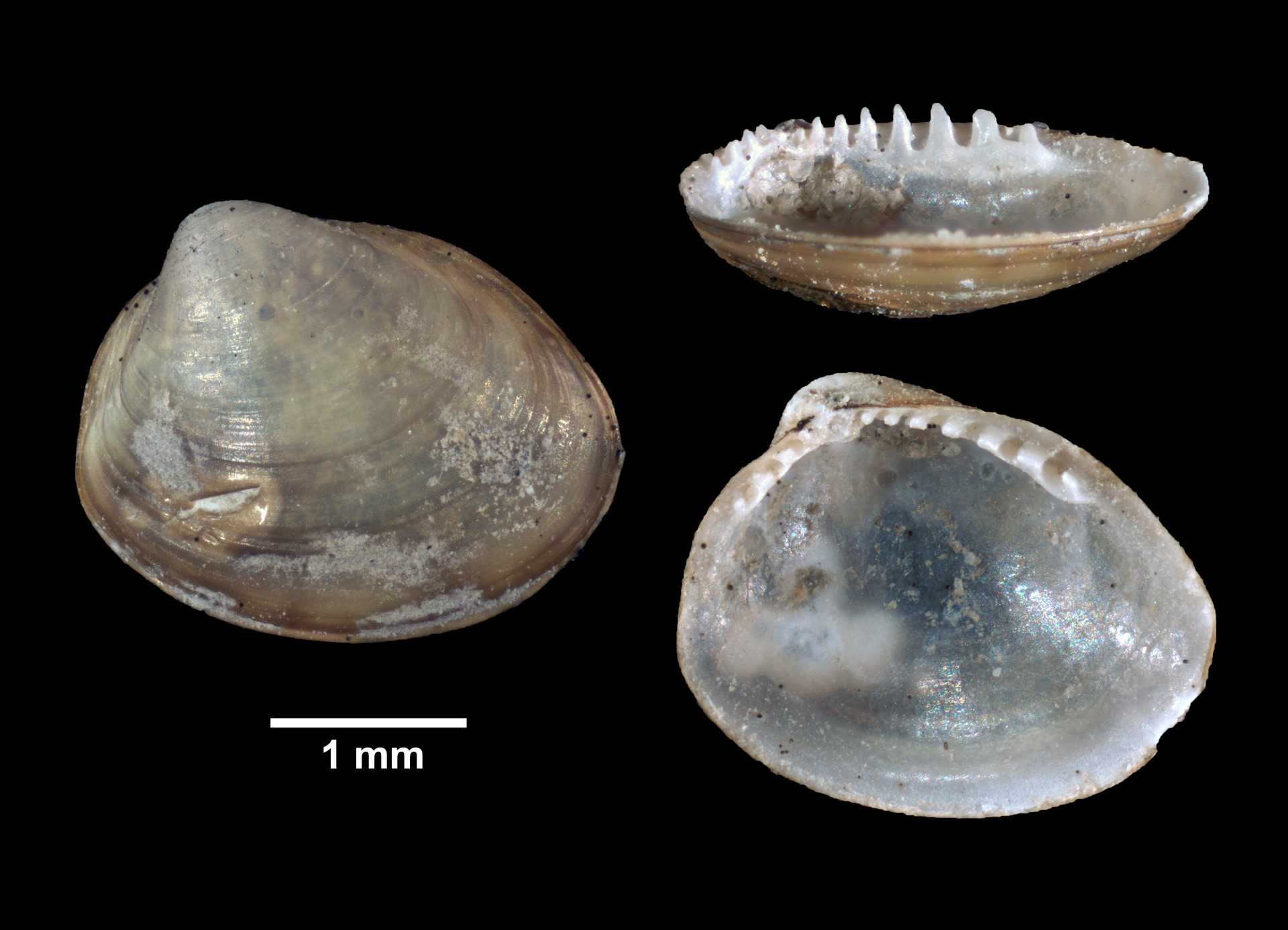
- Shell of Nucula delphinodonta

Scientific classification
- Kingdom: Animalia
- Phylum: Mollusca
- Class: Bivalvia
- Order: Nuculida
- Family: Nuculidae
- Genus: Nucula; Lamarck, 1799

Synonyms
- Arca nucleus Linnaeus, 1758

= Nucula =

Nucula Temporal range: Arenig - Recent

Genus of bivalves

Nucula is a genus of very small saltwater clams. They are part of the family Nuculidae.

== Fossil records ==
This genus is very ancient. Fossils are known from the Arenig to the Quaternary (age range: from 478.6 to 0.0 million years ago). Fossils are found in the marine strata all over the world.

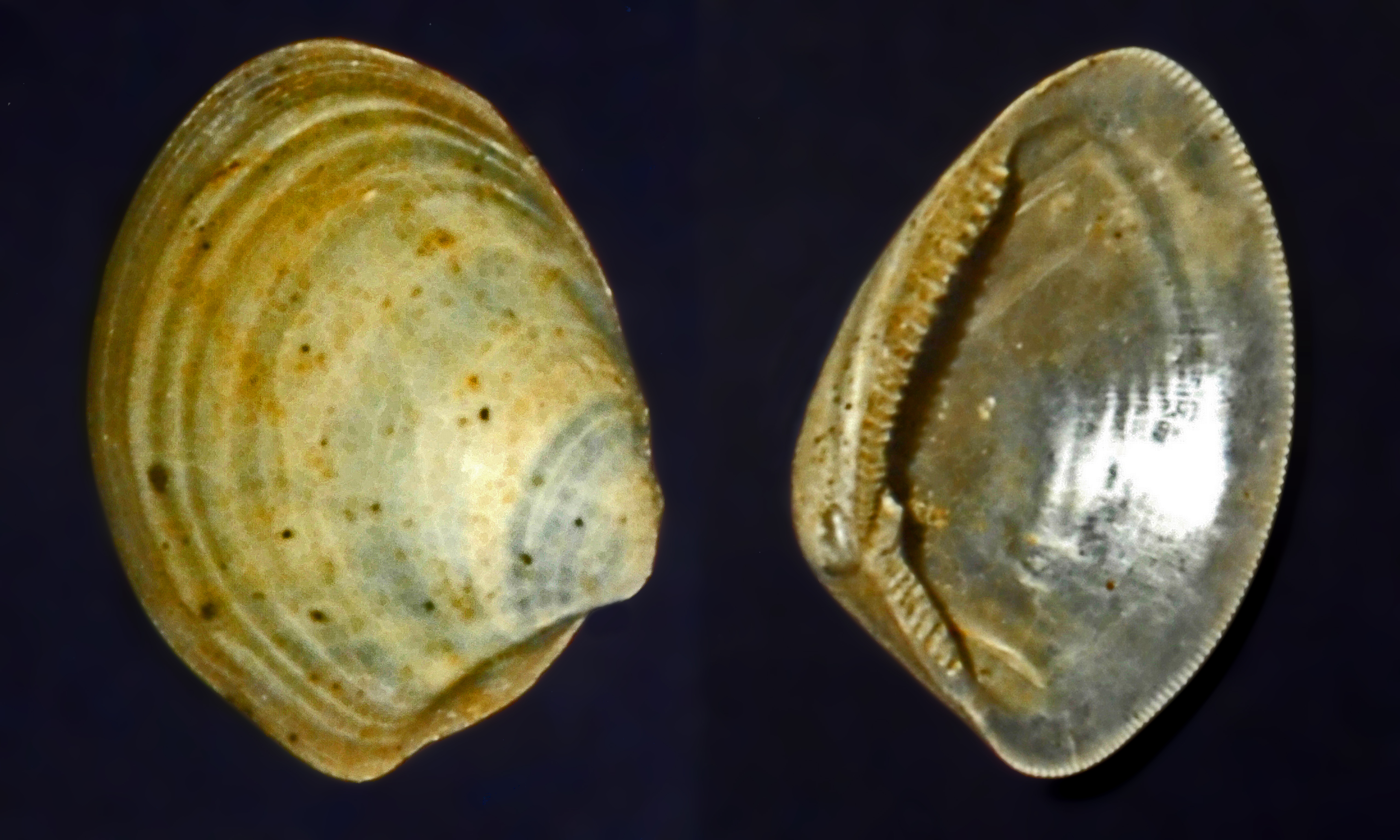
Fossil valves of Nucula piacentina from Pliocene of Italy

== Description ==
Shells of species within this genus can reach a size of about 30 millimetres (1.2 in). They are equivalve, symmetrical, approximately triangular. The surface has fine concentric growth lines. These clams live in the muddy sand close to the sediment surface at a depth of 20 to 200 meters.

== Species ==
Nowadays there are still many species of this genus, which have had virtually no change in the course of time. Species within the genus Nucula include:

- Nucula annulata Hampson, 1971
- Nucula atacellana Schenck, 1939 - cancellate nutclam
- Nucula austrobenthalis Dell, 1990
- Nucula beachportensis Verco, 1907
- Nucula benguelana (A. H. Clarke, 1961)
- Nucula brasiliana Esteves, 1984
- Nucula calcicola Moore, 1977 - reef nutclam
- Nucula callicredemna Dall, 1890
- Nucula cancellata Meek & Hayden, 1856
- Nucula cardara Dall, 1916
- Nucula carlottensis Dall, 1897 - Charlotte nutclam
- Nucula certisinus Finlay, 1930
- Nucula chrysocome
- Nucula consentanea Melvill & Standen, 1907
- Nucula covra Bergmans, 1978
- Nucula crassicostata E. A. Smith, 1872
- Nucula crassidens Nicklès, 1955
- Nucula crenulata A. Adams, 1856 - crenulate nutclam
- Nucula crystallina Poppe, Tagaro & Stahlschmidt, 2015
- Nucula culebrensis E. A. Smith, 1885
- Nucula cymella Dall, 1886
- Nucula darella Dall, 1916
- Nucula declivis Hinds, 1843
- Nucula delphinodonta Mighels & C. B. Adams, 1842 - dolphintooth nutclam
- Nucula distincta Turton, 1932
- Nucula donaciformis E. A. Smith, 1895
- Nucula dorsocrenata (Habe, 1977)
- Nucula dunedinensis Finlay, 1928
- Nucula exigua G. B. Sowerby I, 1833 - iridescent nutclam, short nutclam
- Nucula exodonta Prashad, 1932
- Nucula faba Xu, 1999
- Nucula falklandica Preston, 1912
- Nucula fernandensis Villarroel, 1971
- Nucula fernandinae Dall, 1927
- Nucula gallinacea Finlay, 1930
- Nucula granulosa Verrill, 1884
- Nucula groenlandica Posselt, 1898 - Greenland nutclam
- Nucula hanleyi Winckworth, 1931
- Nucula hartvigiana Dohrn, 1864
- Nucula hawaiensis Pilsbry, 1921
- Nucula inconspicua H. Adams, 1871
- Nucula insignis (Hayami & Kase, 1993)
- Nucula interflucta Marincovich, 1973
- Nucula iphigenia Dall, 1896
- Nucula irregularis G. B. Sowerby III, 1904
- Nucula izushotoensis (Okutani, 1966)
- Nucula kanaka Bergmans, 1991
- Nucula kerguelensis Thiele, 1912
- Nucula libera Bergmans, 1991
- Nucula malabarica Hanley, 1860
- Nucula mariae Nolf, 2005
- Nucula marmorea Hinds, 1843
- Nucula marshalli Schenck, 1939
- Nucula mayi (Iredale, 1930)
- Nucula mesembrina (Hedley, 1916)
- Nucula mitralis Hinds, 1843
- Nucula multidentata Prashad, 1933
- Nucula nicklesi Cosel, 1995
- Nucula nitidosa Winckworth, 1930 (unaccepted name: Nucula turgida Leckenby & Marshall, 1875)
- Nucula nitidula A. Adams, 1856
- Nucula nitidulaformis Powell, 1971
- Nucula notobenthalis Thiele, 1912
- Nucula nucleus (Linnaeus, 1758)
- Nucula oppressa Bergmans, 1991
- Nucula papillifera Thiele & Jaeckel, 1931
- Nucula paulula A. Adams, 1856
- Nucula percrassa (Conrad, 1858 )
- Nucula pisum G. B. Sowerby I, 1833
- Nucula planiculmen Kilburn, 1999
- Nucula praetenta Iredale, 1924
- Nucula profundorum E. A. Smith, 1885
- Nucula proxima Say, 1822 - Atlantic nutclam
- Nucula pseudoexigua Villarroel & Stuardo, 1998
- Nucula pusilla Angas, 1877
- Nucula recens Dell, 1956
- Nucula revei Bergmans, 1978
- Nucula rhytidopleura Kilburn, 1999
- Nucula rossiana Finlay, 1930
- Nucula rugulosa G. B. Sowerby I, 1833
- Nucula saltator (Iredale, 1939)
- Nucula schencki Hertlein & Strong, 1940
- Nucula sculpturata G. B. Sowerby III, 1904
- Nucula semen Thiele & Jaeckel, 1931
- Nucula semiornata d'Orbigny, 1842
- Nucula sericea Thiele & Jaeckel, 1931
- Nucula striolata A. Adams, 1856
- Nucula suahelica (Thiele & Jaeckel, 1931)
- Nucula subluxa Kilburn, 1999
- Nucula subovata Verrill & Bush, 1898
- Nucula sulcata Bronn, 1831
- Nucula sultana Thiele & Jaeckel, 1931
- Nucula surinamensis Van Regteren Altena, 1968
- Nucula tamatavica Odhner, 1943
- Nucula tenuis (Montagu, 1808)
- Nucula tersior Marwick, 1929 †
- Nucula thielei Schenck, 1939
- Nucula tokyoensis Yokoyama, 1920
- Nucula torresi E. A. Smith, 1885
- Nucula trigonica Lan & Lee, 2001
- Nucula tumidula (Malm, 1860)
- Nucula venezuelana Weisbord, 1964
- Nucula vincentiana (Cotton & Godfrey, 1938)
- Nucula zophos A. H. Clark, 1960

== Extinct species ==
Extinct species within the genus Nucula include:

- N. alcocki † Noetling 1895
- N. andersoni † Clark & Durham 1946
- N. assiniboiensis † Russell & Landes 1937
- N. athabaskensis † McLearn 1931
- N. brewsterensis † Hassan 1953
- N. cancellata † Meek & Hayden 1857
- N. cancellata † Vredenburg 1928
- N. catalina † Olsson 1930
- N. chrysocoma † Dall 1908
- N. cilleborgensis † Ravn 1907
- N. concinna † Sowerby 1836
- N. cossmanni † Vincent 1892
- N. costaeimbricatus † Newton 1922
- N. crepida † Marwick 1931
- N. cunifrons † Conrad 1860
- N. domandaensis † Eames 1951
- N. gabbiana † Dickerson 1916
- N. greppina † Deshayes 1858
- N. major † Richards 1944
- N. mancorensis † Olsson 1931
- N. martini † Finlay 1927
- N. micheleae † Marincovich jr. 1993
- N. morundiana † Tate 1886
- N. narica † Vredenburg 1928
- N. nejdensis † Abbass 1972
- N. njalindugensis † Martin 1919
- N. observatoria † Ihering 1907
- N. orbicella † Olsson 1922
- N. paboensis † Olsson 1931
- N. paytensis † Adams 1856
- N. piacentina † Lamarck
- N. pilkeyi † Ward & Blackwelder 1987
- N. planimarginata † Meek & Hayden 1857
- N. praemissa † Semper 1861
- N. prunicola † Dall 1898
- N. rembangensis † Martin 1919
- N. reticularis † Ortmann 1900
- N. sedanensis † Haanstra & Spiker 1932
- N. semistriata † Tate 1886
- N. shaleri † Dall 1894
- N. sinaria † Dall 1898
- N. stantoni † Stephenson 1923
- N. studeri † d'Archiac 1850
- N. subrotundata † Morningstar 1922
- N. subtransversa † Nyst 1844
- N. suprastriata † Arnold 1903
- N. tallahalaensis † Dockery 1982
- N. taphria † Dall 1898
- N. tatriana † King 1850
- N. tersior † Marwick 1929
- N. tumida † Tenison Woods 1877
- N. turgens † Wood 1879
- N. venezuelana † Weisbord 1964
- N. ventricosa † Hall 1868
- N. vestigia † Marwick 1929
- N. vicksburgensis † Conrad 1848
- N. waikuraensis † Marwick 1931
- N. washingtonensis † Weaver 1916
