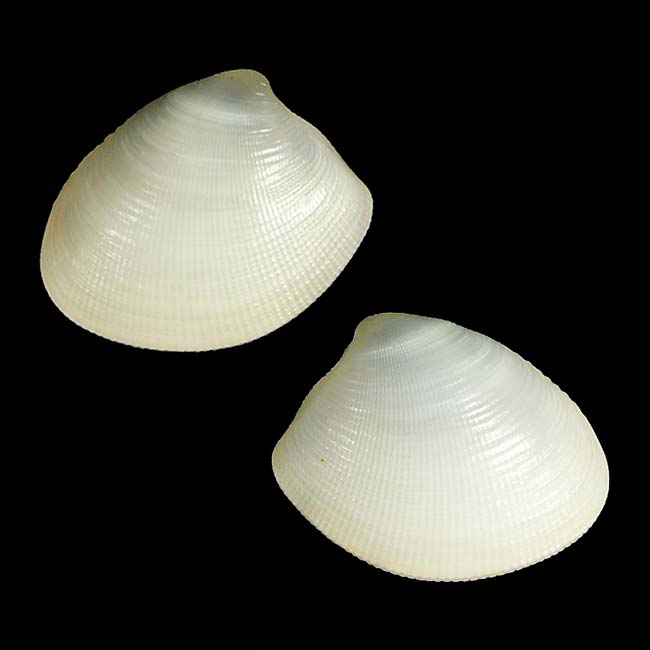

Scientific classification
- Kingdom: Animalia
- Phylum: Mollusca
- Class: Bivalvia
- Order: Nuculida
- Family: Nuculidae
- Genus: Nucula
- Species: N. crystallina

Binomial name
- Nucula crystallina Poppe, Tagaro & Stahlschmidt, 2015

= Nucula crystallina =

Species of bivalve

Nucula crystallina is a species of marine bivalvia mollusk in the family Nuculidae.

== Original description ==
- Poppe G.T., Tagaro S.P. & Stahlschmidt P. (2015). New shelled molluscan species from the central Philippines I. Visaya. 4(3): 15–59.

page(s): 35, pl. 14 figs 1–3.
