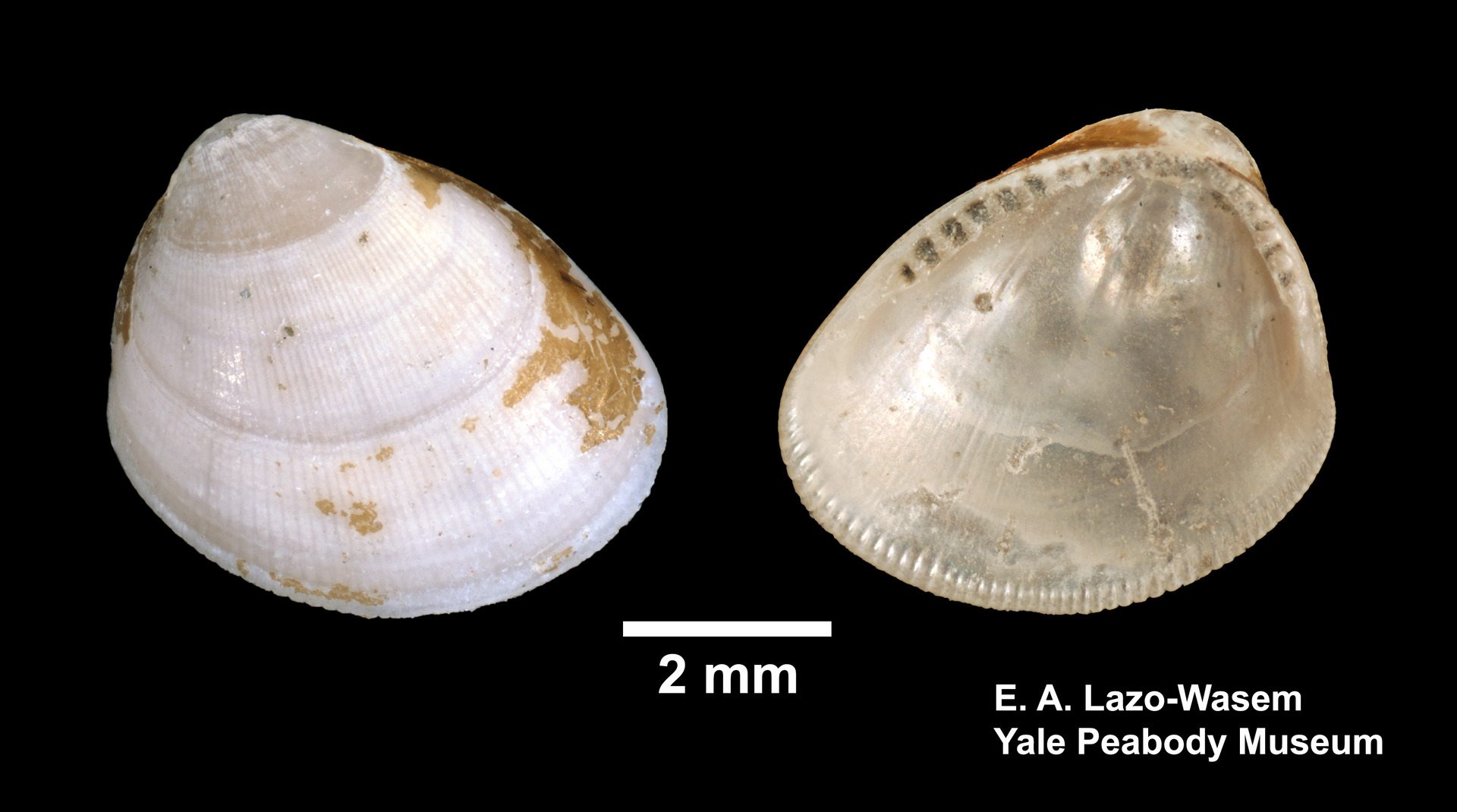

Scientific classification
- Kingdom: Animalia
- Phylum: Mollusca
- Class: Bivalvia
- Order: Nuculida
- Family: Nuculidae
- Genus: Nucula
- Species: N. proxima

Binomial name
- Nucula proxima Say, 1822

= Nucula proxima =

Species of bivalve

Nucula proxima, commonly known as the Atlantic nut clam, is a marine bivalve mollusc in the family Nuculidae. It can be found along the Atlantic coast of North America, ranging from Nova Scotia to Texas, including Bermuda.

== Description ==
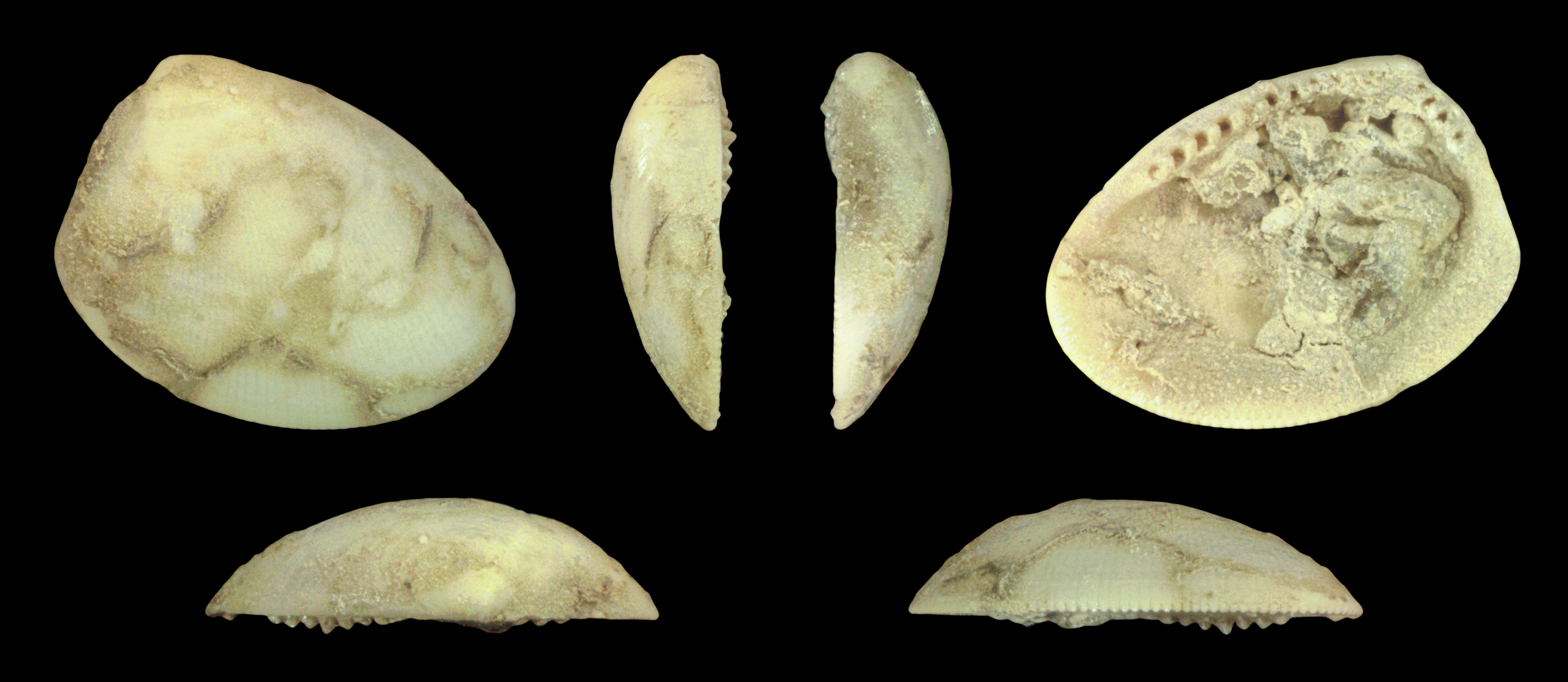
Fossil, Pliocene, Florida

Nucula proxima has a obliquely oval, off-white to gray, shell. The exterior is glossy smooth with brownish conmarginal growth lines. The interior is a nacreous white color with fine radial striations. The length ranges from 3 mm to 10 mm. Size, shape, and color vary based on where the species is environmentally, this has led to multiple named forms.

== Ecology ==
Nucula proxima typically lives on muddy-sand bottoms. Unlike most bivalves which are filter-feeders, N. proxima is a deposit-feeder. Thus it consumes decomposing organic matter film and bacteria that accumulates on the sea floor. They do this by using their labial palp, a proboscis likes structure that has a ciliated groove, to feed.
