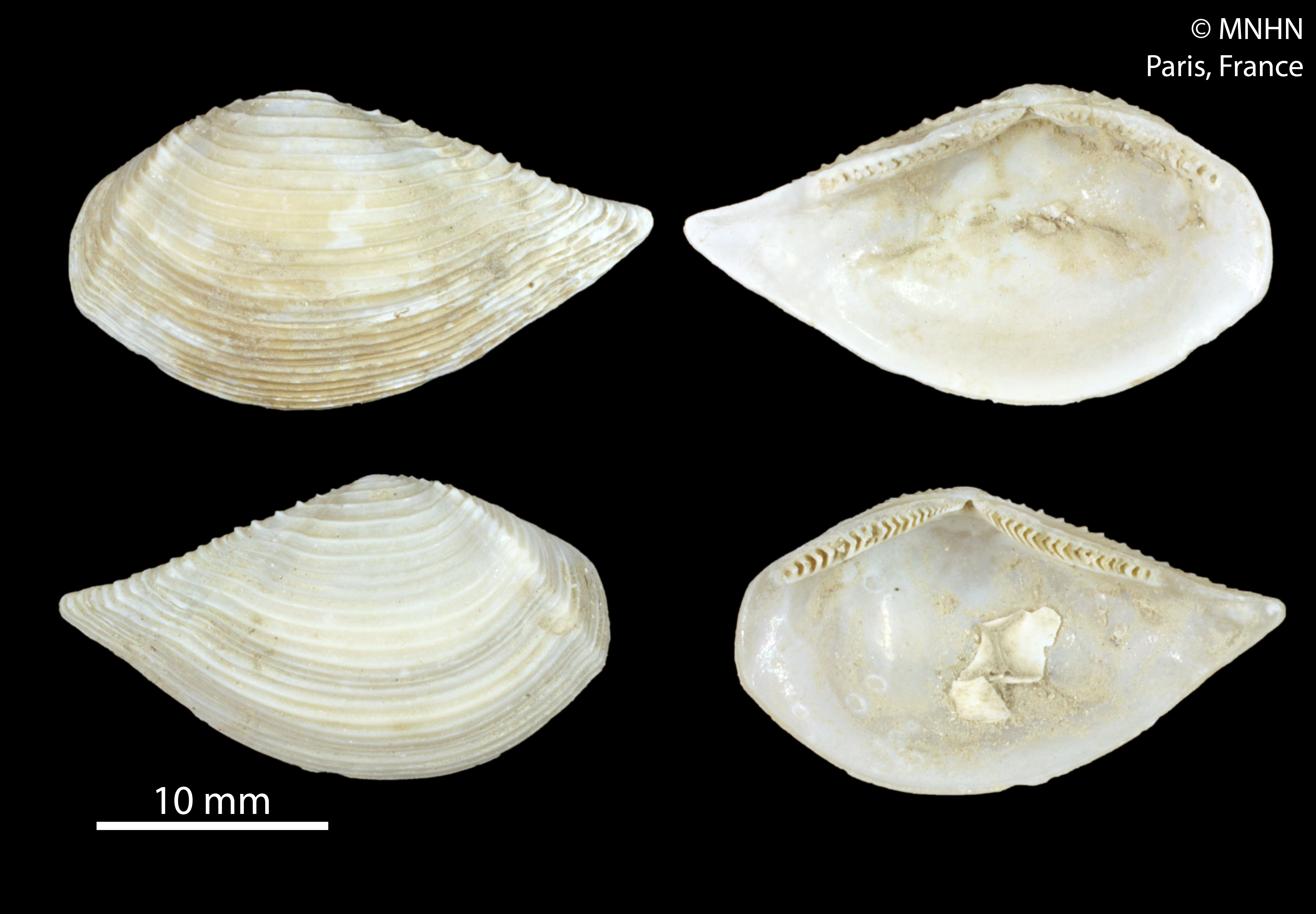
- Shell of Saccella illirica (paratype at MNHN, Paris)

Scientific classification
- Domain: Eukaryota
- Kingdom: Animalia
- Phylum: Mollusca
- Class: Bivalvia
- Order: Nuculanida
- Superfamily: Nuculanoidea
- Family: Nuculanidae
- Genus: Saccella; Woodring, 1925

Type species
- Arca fragilis Deshayes, 1858

Synonyms
- Jupiteria (Saccella) Woodring, 1925; Leda (Ledina) Sacco, 1898 (invalid: junior homonym of Ledina...); Leda (Saccella) Woodring, 1925; Nuculana (Saccella) Woodring, 1925 · unaccepted; Nuculana (Scaeoleda) Iredale, 1929 (junior synonym); Scaeoleda Iredale, 1929

= Saccella =

Genus of bivalves

Saccella is a genus of bivalves belonging to the family Nuculanidae.

== Species ==
- Saccella acapulcensis (Pilsbry & H. N. Lowe, 1932)
- † Saccella acinaciformis (Tate, 1886)
- Saccella acrita (Dall, 1908)
- † Saccella andrewi (Marwick, 1931)
- Saccella approximans (Prashad, 1932)
- † Saccella arowhana (Marwick, 1931)
- Saccella bathybia (Prashad, 1932)
- Saccella bellula (A. Adams, 1856)
- Saccella brookei (Hanley, 1860)
- Saccella caloundra (Iredale, 1929)
- Saccella cellulita (Dall, 1896)
- Saccella comita (Cotton & Godfrey, 1938)
- Saccella commutata (Philippi, 1844)
- Saccella confusa (Hanley, 1860)
- Saccella corbuloides (E. A. Smith, 1885)
- † Saccella costulata (Deshayes, 1858)
- Saccella crassa (Hinds, 1843)
- Saccella cuneata (G. B. Sowerby I, 1833)
- Saccella cygnea (Thiele, 1931)
- Saccella darwini (E. A. Smith, 1884)
- Saccella discrepans (Prashad, 1932)
- † Saccella duplicarina (Laws, 1939)
- Saccella eburnea (G. B. Sowerby I, 1833)
- Saccella electilis (Hedley, 1915)
- Saccella elenensis (G. B. Sowerby I, 1833)
- † Saccella expansa (Staadt, 1913)
- † Saccella falcigera Marwick, 1965
- Saccella fastigata (Keen, 1958)
- † Saccella galeottiana (Nyst, 1845)
- Saccella gordonis (Yokoyama, 1920)
- Saccella hedleyi (Fleming, 1951)
- Saccella hindsii (Hanley, 1860)
- Saccella illirica (Carrozza, 1987)
- Saccella impar (Pilsbry & H. N. Lowe, 1932)
- Saccella irradiata (G. B. Sowerby II, 1870)
- Saccella laeviradius (Pilsbry & H. N. Lowe, 1932)
- Saccella larranagai (Klappenbach & Scarabino, 1969)
- Saccella mauritiana (G. B. Sowerby I, 1833)
- Saccella maxwelli Beu, 2006
- Saccella micans (Hanley, 1860)
- † Saccella motutaraensis (Powell, 1935)
- Saccella novaeguineensis (E. A. Smith, 1885)
- † Saccella onairoensis (Marwick, 1926)
- † Saccella pahiensis (C. A. Fleming, 1950)
- Saccella penderi (Dall & Bartsch, 1910)
- † Saccella probellula (Marwick, 1929)
- † Saccella redunca (Dell, 1950)
- Saccella robsoni (Prashad, 1932)
- † Saccella ruellensis (Glibert & van de Poel, 1965)
- Saccella sematensis (Suzuki & Ishizuka, 1943)
- † Saccella semiteres (Hutton, 1877)
- Saccella sibogai (Prashad, 1932)
- † Saccella striata (Lamarck, 1805)
- Saccella takaoensis (Otsuka, 1936)
- Saccella taphria (Dall, 1897)
- Saccella tashiensis (T. C. Lan & Y.-C. Lee, 2001)
- † Saccella tenellula (Bartrum & Powell, 1928)
- † Saccella tumidula (Cossmann, 1886)
- Saccella ventricosa (Hinds, 1843)
- Saccella verconis (Tate, 1891)
- Saccella verrilliana (Dall, 1886)
- Saccella vitrea (d'Orbigny, 1853)
- Saccella vulgaris (A. P. Brown & Pilsbry, 1913)
- † Saccella waihiana (Powell, 1931)
- † Saccella waikohuensis (Marwick, 1931)
- Saccella watsoni (E. A. Smith, 1885)
- † Saccella webbi Marwick, 1965

Synonyms

- Saccella acuta (Conrad, 1831): synonym of Nuculana acuta (Conrad, 1831)
- Saccella agapea (Dall, 1908): synonym of Jupiteria agapea (Dall, 1908)
- Saccella concentrica (Say, 1824): synonym of Nuculana concentrica (Say, 1824)
- Saccella dohrni (Hanley, 1861): synonym of Nuculana dohrni (Hanley, 1861)
- Saccella pontonia (Dall, 1890): synonym of Jupiteria pontonia (Dall, 1890)
- Saccella soyoae Habe, 1958: synonym of Nuculana husamaru Nomura, 1940
