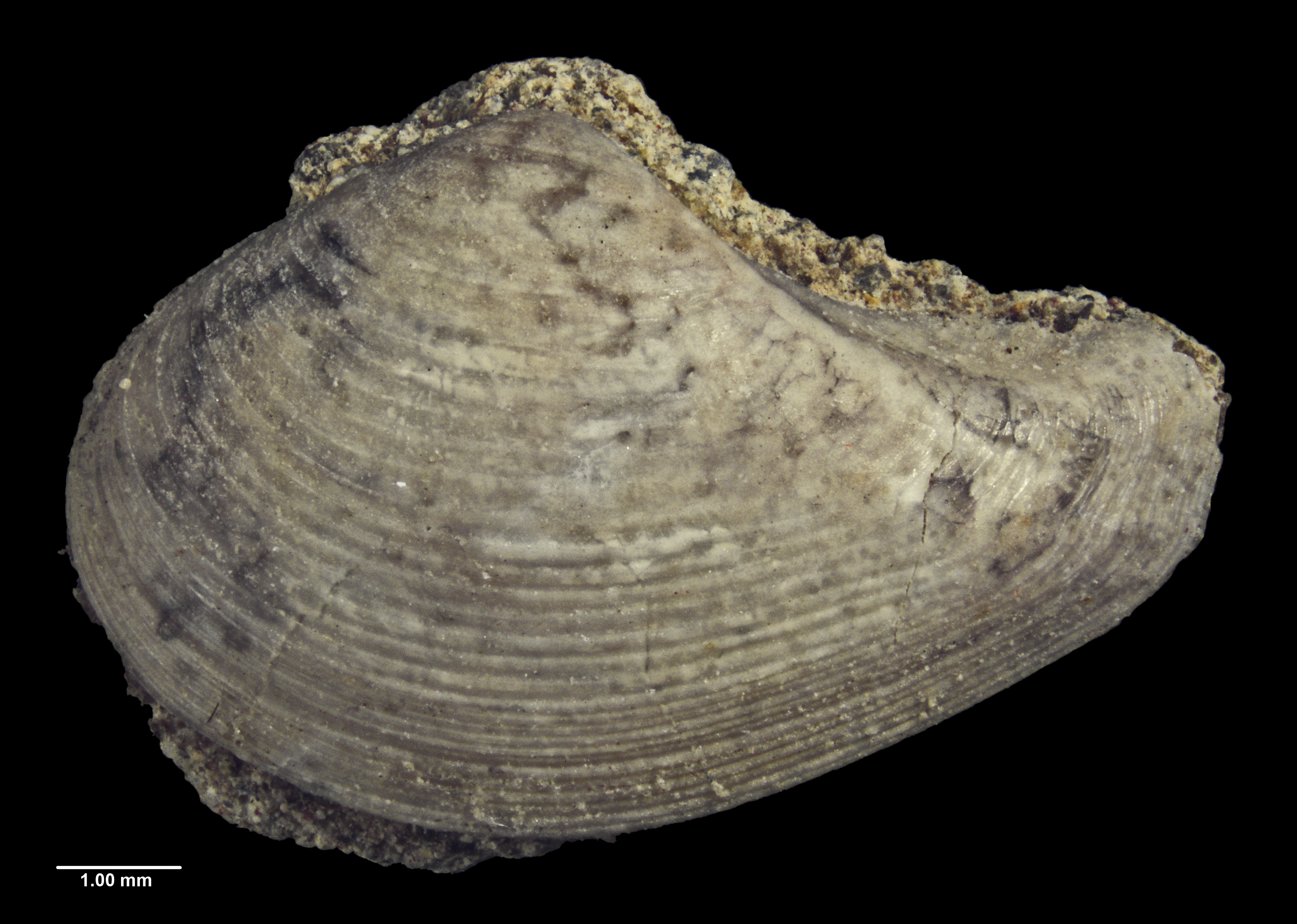
- Holotype from Auckland War Memorial Museum

Scientific classification
- Kingdom: Animalia
- Phylum: Mollusca
- Class: Bivalvia
- Order: Nuculanida
- Family: Nuculanidae
- Genus: Saccella
- Species: †S. motutaraensis

Binomial name
- †Saccella motutaraensis (A. W. B. Powell, 1935)

Synonyms
- Nuculana (Saccella) motutaraensis A. W. B. Powell, 1935; Nuculana motutaraensis A. W. B. Powell, 1935

= Saccella motutaraensis =

Saccella motutaraensis Temporal range: early Miocene

Extinct species of gastropod

Saccella motutaraensis is an extinct species of bivalve, a marine mollusc in the family Nuculanidae. Fossils of the species date to early Miocene strata of the west coast of the Auckland Region, New Zealand.

== Description ==
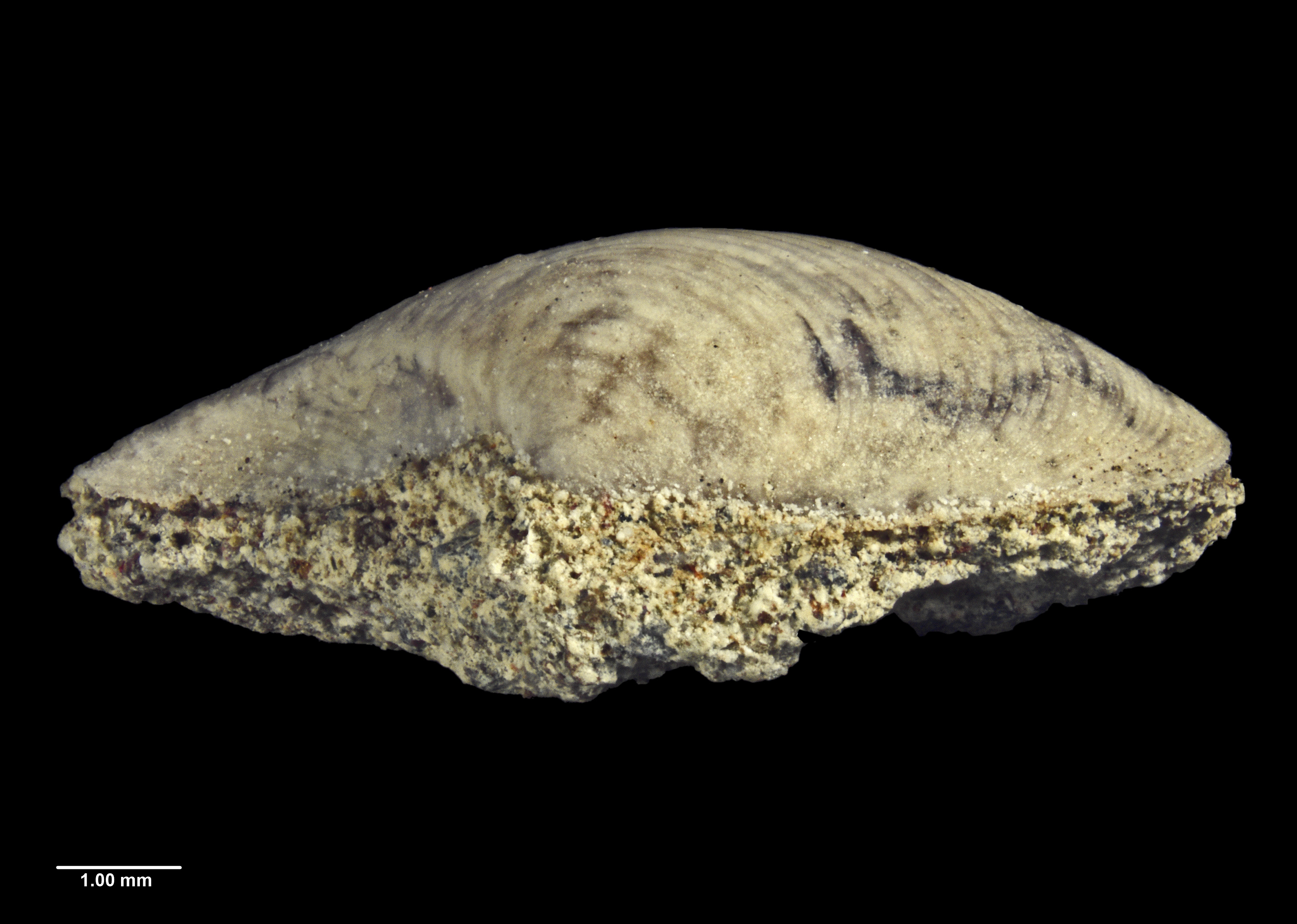
Reverse view of holotype

In the original description, Powell described the species as follows:

Shell of moderate size, elongate-oval, narrowed posteriorly to a blunt upturned rostrum, beaks prominent, broadly rounded, situated a little in front of the middle. Anterior end broadly and regularly rounded. Posterior end concave along the dorsal margin, and gently upcurved basally to a blunt rounded rostrum which is tilted upwards slightly at the tip. Posterior area broad, concave, bounded by a slight ridge which bifurcates; the stronger arm running from the beak to the upper extremity of the rostrum and the weaker to a slight angulation between the lower extremity of the rostrum and the basal margin. Sculpture of strong, regular, well-spaced, concentric ridges, five per millimetre. The concentric ridges become obsolete over the posterior area proper, the lower ridge of the rostrum being crossed by the normal sculpture.

The holotype of the species measures 6 mm (0.24 in) in height and 9.5 mm (0.37 in) in diameter. The species can be identified due to its distinctive outline and sculpture.

== Taxonomy ==
The species was first described by A. W. B. Powell in 1935 as Nuculana (Saccella) motutaraensis. Its current accepted name is Saccella motutaraensis. The holotype was collected at an unknown date prior to 1935 from fallen rocks at the southern end of Maukatia Bay, south of Muriwai, Auckland Region (then more commonly known as Motutara), and is held in the collections of Auckland War Memorial Museum.

== Distribution ==
This extinct marine species occurs in early Miocene strata of the Nihotupu Formation of New Zealand, on the west coast of the Waitākere Ranges of the Auckland Region, New Zealand. The Powell Bay site deposits of the Nihotupu Formation in the western Waitākere Ranges are mid-bathyal 800–2,000 m (2,600–6,600 ft).
