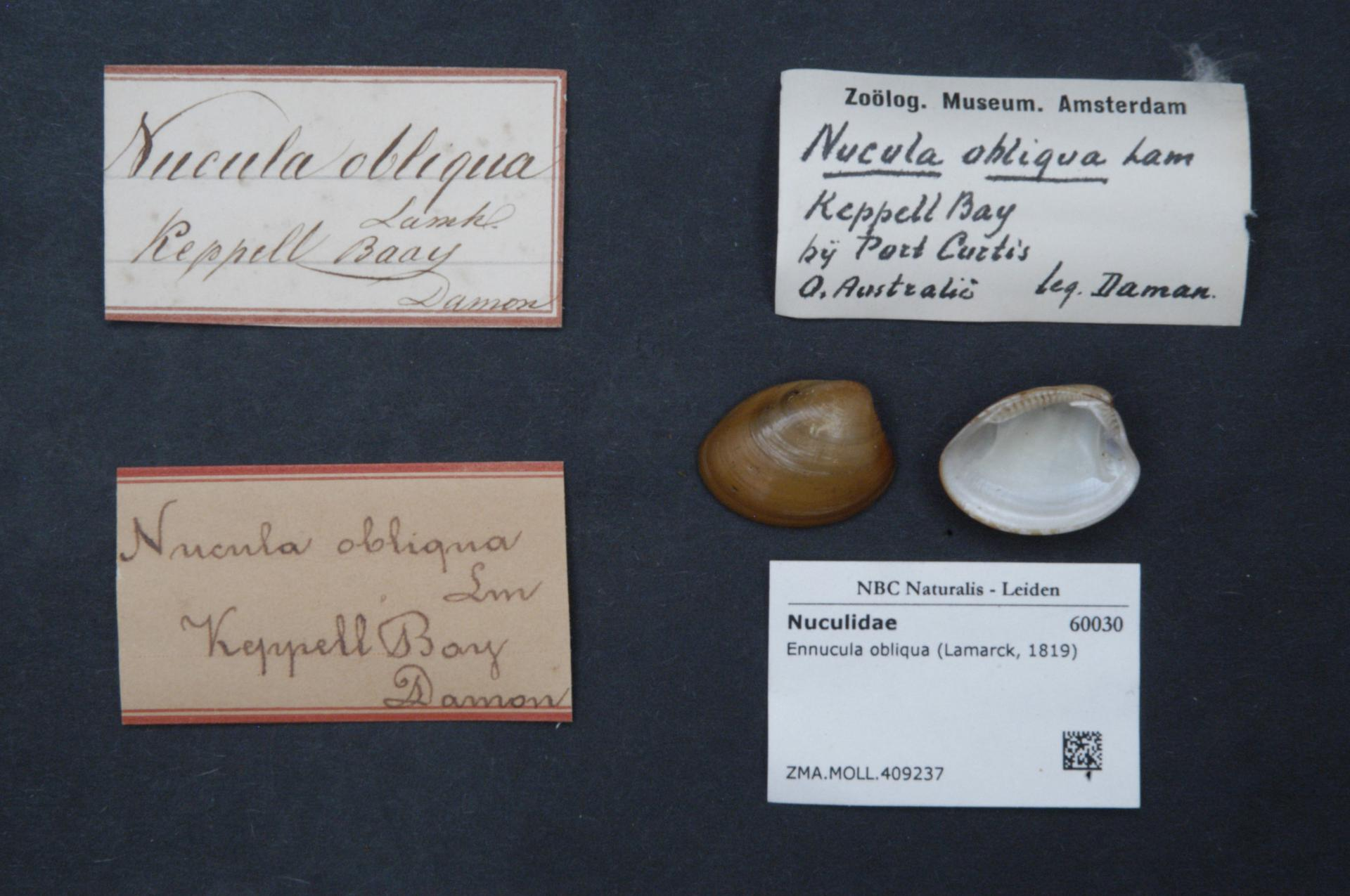
- E. obliqua

Scientific classification
- Kingdom: Animalia
- Phylum: Mollusca
- Class: Bivalvia
- Order: Nuculida
- Family: Nuculidae
- Genus: Ennucula; Iredale, 1931

Type species
- Ennucula obliqua Lamarck, 1819

Species
- See text

= Ennucula =

Ennucula Temporal range: Miocene-Present, 15.6–0 Ma

Genus of molluscs

Ennucula is a genus of marine bivalves that inhabit all the world's oceans. They are placed in the family Nuculidae. Ennucula fossils have been in strata deposited 15.6-15.4 million years ago.

== Species ==
- Ennucula aegeensis Forbes, 1844
- Ennucula agujana Dall, 1908
- Ennucula astricta Iredale, 1931
- Ennucula bathybia Prashad, 1932
- Ennucula bengalensis E. A. Smith, 1895
- Ennucula cardara Dall, 1916
- Ennucula colombiana Dall, 1908
- Ennucula convexa G. B. Sowerby I, 1833
- Ennucula corbuloides Seguenza, 1877
- Ennucula corticata Møller, 1842
- Ennucula cumingii Hinds, 1843
- Ennucula dalmasi Dautzenberg, 1900
- Ennucula dautzenbergi Prashad, 1932
- Ennucula decipiens Philippi, 1844
- Ennucula definita Iredale, 1939
- Ennucula delphinodonta Mighels & C. B. Adams, 1842
- Ennucula dilecta E. A. Smith, 1891
- Ennucula elongata Rhind & Allen, 1992
- Ennucula eltanini Dell, 1990
- Ennucula faba F.-S. Xu, 1999
- Ennucula georgiana Dell, 1964
- Ennucula granulosa Verrill, 1884
- Ennucula grayi d'Orbigny, 1846
- Ennucula interflucta Marincovich, 1973
- Ennucula jaeckeli M. Huber, 2010
- Ennucula layardii A. Adams, 1856
- Ennucula linki Dall, 1916
- Ennucula mareana Weisbord, 1964
- Ennucula mirifica Dall, 1907
- Ennucula niponica E. A. Smith, 1885
- Ennucula obliqua Lamarck, 1819
- Ennucula oliva Kilburn, 1999
- Ennucula orekta Iredale, 1939
- Ennucula pachydonta Prashad, 1932
- Ennucula panamina Dall, 1908
- Ennucula perforata Rhind & Allen, 1992
- Ennucula pernambucensis E. A. Smith, 1885
- Ennucula privigna Iredale, 1939
- Ennucula puelcha d'Orbigny, 1842
- Ennucula romboides Scarlato, 1981
- Ennucula sansibarensis Thiele, 1931
- Ennucula siberutensis Thiele, 1931
- Ennucula similis Rhind & Allen, 1992
- Ennucula strangei A. Adams, 1856
- Ennucula strangeiformis Dell, 1956
- Ennucula superba Hedley, 1902
- Ennucula taeniolata Dall, 1908
- Ennucula tenuis Montagu, 1808
