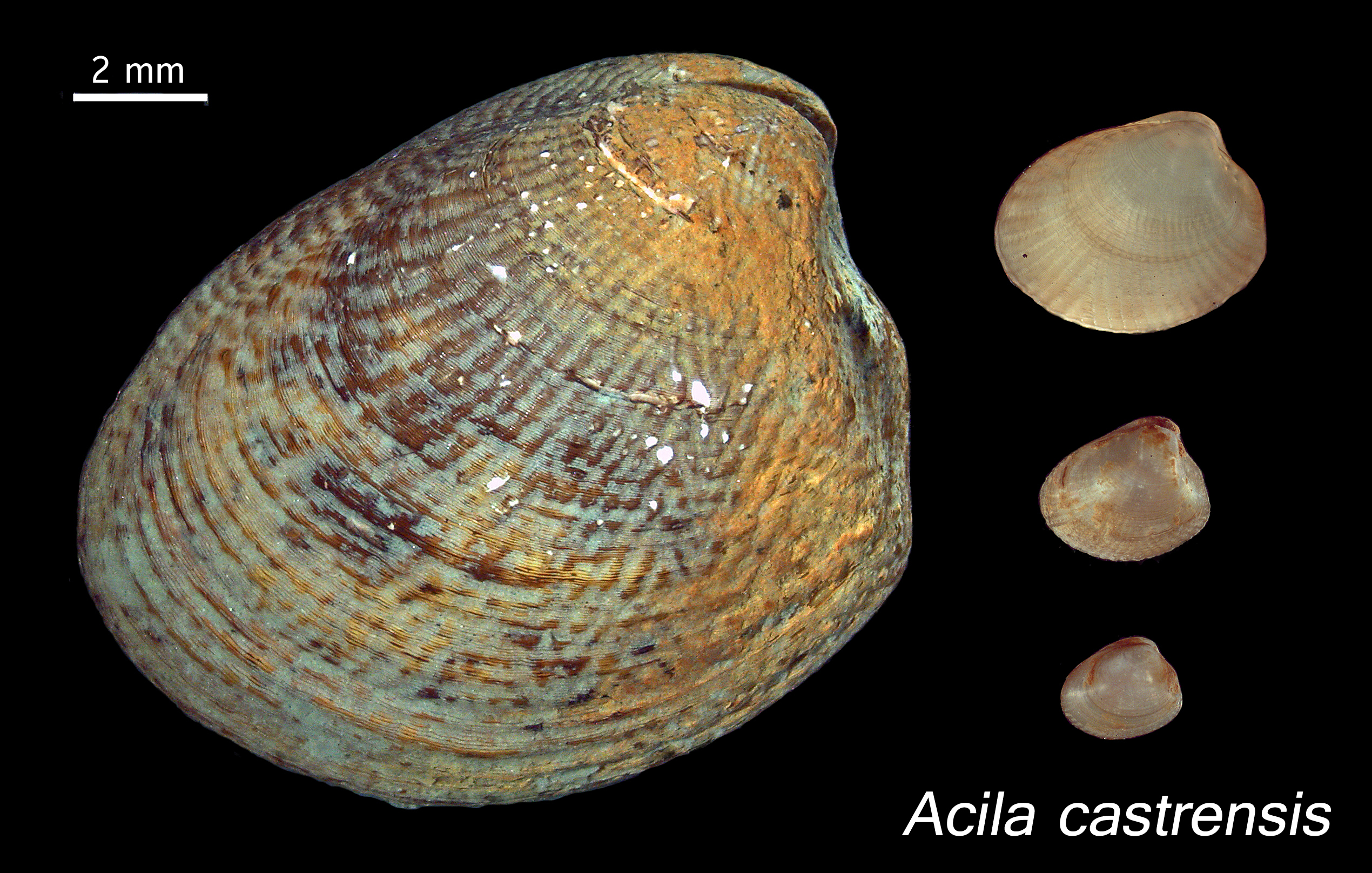
- Acila castrensis

Scientific classification
- Kingdom: Animalia
- Phylum: Mollusca
- Class: Bivalvia
- Order: Nuculida
- Family: Nuculidae
- Genus: Acila; H. Adams & A. Adams, 1858

= Acila =

Acila Temporal range: Albian-Holocene, 113.0–0 Ma

Genus of bivalves

Acila is a genus of marine bivalves in the family Nuculidae. Acila fossils have been found dating back to 113.0 Ma ago.

== Species ==
As of March, 2021, the genus contains these species:

- Acila castrensis Hinds, 1843
- Acila divaricata Hinds, 1843
- Acila fultoni E. A. Smith, 1892
- Acila granulata E. A. Smith, 1906
- Acila insignis Gould, 1861
- Acila jucunda Thiele, 1931
- Acila minutoides Kuroda & Habe in Habe, 1958
- Acila mirabilis A. Adams & Reeve, 1850
- Acila vigilia Schenck, 1936
