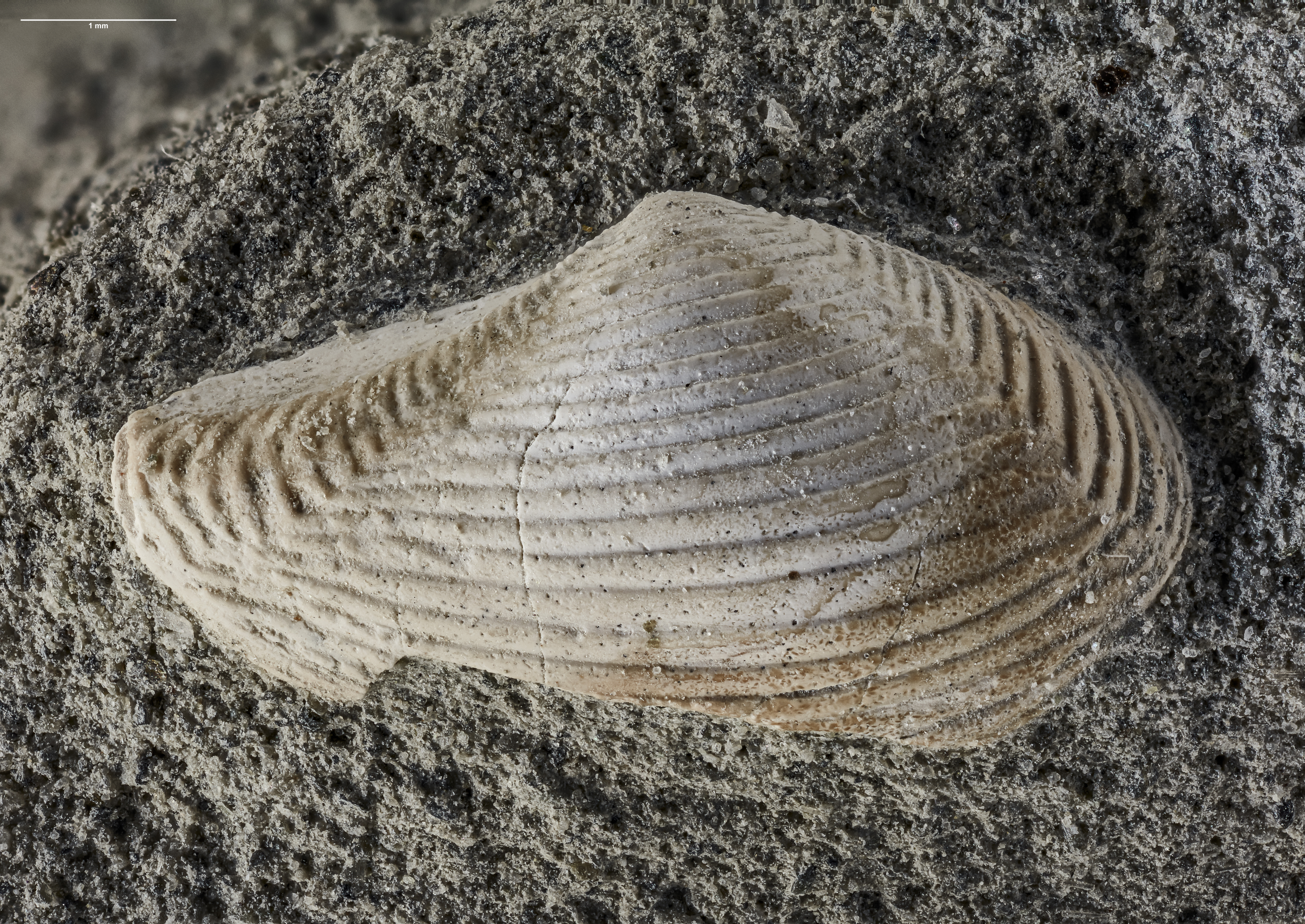
- Holotype from Auckland War Memorial Museum

Scientific classification
- Kingdom: Animalia
- Phylum: Mollusca
- Class: Bivalvia
- Order: Nuculanida
- Family: Nuculanidae
- Genus: Saccella
- Species: S. waihiana

Binomial name
- Saccella waihiana (A. W. B. Powell, 1931)

Synonyms
- Nuculana (Saccella) waihiana A. W. B. Powell, 1931

= Saccella waihiana =

Saccella waihiana Temporal range: late Pliocene

Extinct species of gastropod

Saccella waihiana is an extinct species of bivalve, a marine mollusc in the family Nuculanidae. Fossils of the species date to late Pliocene strata of the Tangahoe Formation in New Zealand.

== Description ==
In the original description, Powell described the species as follows:

Shell somewhat similar in shape to the Lower Pliocene N. tenellula Bartrum and Powell from Kaawa Creek, but differing in the ribbing, which is a trifle coarser and of a distinctly flexuous pattern, and in the shape of the rostrum, which is not strongly uptilted. The usual concentric ridges, which are about three or four per millimetre at the middle of the shell, become suddenly decurrent towards the sides and then abruptly upcurved to the dorsal margin, almost at right angles. The posterior line of deflection occurs at a short distance below the strong ridge which runs from the umbo to the rostrum. On the anterior end, the line of deflection occurs at about a corresponding position. Posterior area broad, concave, free from sculpture, and bounded below by the strong ridge already referred to.

The holotype of the species has a height of 4 mm (0.16 in), length of 7.5 mm (0.30 in), and thickness of 2.0 mm (0.079 in) for a single valve.

== Taxonomy ==
The species was first described by A. W. B. Powell in 1931, who used the name Nuculana (Saccella) waihiana. The current accepted name is Saccella waihiana. The holotype was collected in January 1931 from near the mouth of Waihi Stream near Hāwera, Taranaki, and is held in the collections of Auckland War Memorial Museum.

== Distribution ==
This extinct marine species occurs in late Pliocene (Waipipian) strata of the Tangahoe Formation, primarily associated with the Taranaki and Manawatū–Whanganui regions of New Zealand. Fossils of the species have been found near Hāwera, South Taranaki.
