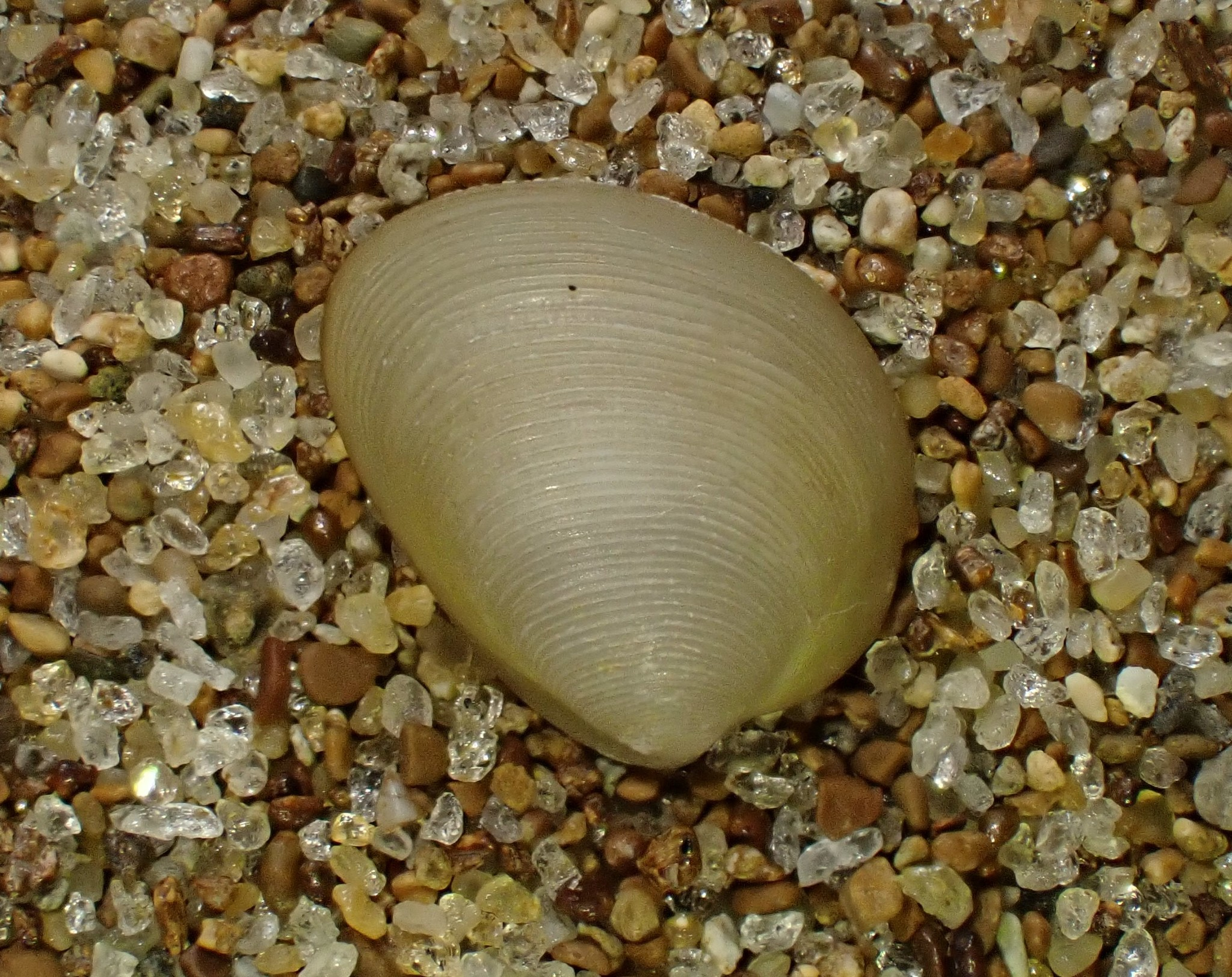

Scientific classification
- Kingdom: Animalia
- Phylum: Mollusca
- Class: Bivalvia
- Order: Nuculida
- Family: Nuculidae
- Genus: Linucula
- Species: L. hartvigiana

Binomial name
- Linucula hartvigiana (Dohrn, 1864)

Synonyms
- Nucula hartvigiana Dohrn, 1864

= Linucula hartvigiana =

Species of bivalve

Linucula hartvigiana, commonly known as clam nut or nut shell, is a bivalve mollusc. Linucula hartvigiana has a brown oval shell and grows up to 6-8mm in width. Linucula hartvigiana is found in unpolluted subtidal and intertidal muddy-sand habitats throughout New Zealand.
