= Phestia =

Phestia Temporal range: Devonian-Permian ~412–252 Ma

Scientific classification
- Domain: Eukaryota
- Kingdom: Animalia
- Phylum: Mollusca
- Class: Bivalvia
- Order: Nuculanida
- Family: Nuculanidae
- Genus: †Phestia; Chernyshev, 1951

Species
- See text

Extinct genus of clam

Phestia is an extinct genus of clam belonging to order Nuculanida and family Nuculanidae.

Specimens have been found on all seven continents.

== Species ==
- P. basedowi Etheridge Jr., 1907
- P. corrugata Hoare et al., 1989
- P. darwini de Koninck, 1877
- P. guizhouensis Xu, 1980
- P. hunanensis Ku and Chen, 1963
- P. inflata Morningstar, 1922
- P. inflatiformis Chernyshev, 1989
- P. jamesi Biakov, 2002
- P. lusabaensis Dickins, 1999
- P. nova Waterhouse, 1983
- P. obtusa Hoare et al. 1989
- P. pandoraeformis Stevens, 1858
- P. perumbonata White, 1880
- P. sabbatinae Pagani, 2004
- P. sinuata Dembskaja, 1972
- P. speluncaria Geinitz, 1848
- P. subucuta Waagen, 1881
- P. thompsoni Reed, 1932
- P. undosa Muromtseva, 1984
- P. wortheni Hoare et al. 1989
- P. zhejiangensis Liu, 1976
