= Condylonucula =

Scientific classification
- Domain: Eukaryota
- Kingdom: Animalia
- Phylum: Mollusca
- Class: Bivalvia
- Order: Nuculida
- Family: Nuculidae
- Genus: Condylonucula; Moore, 1977

Genus of bivalves

Condylonucula is a genus of bivalves belonging to the family Nuculidae.

The species of this genus are found in Central America and Northwestern Africa.

Species:

- Condylonucula bicornis (Gofas & Salas, 1996)
- Condylonucula cynthiae Moore, 1977
- Condylonucula maya Moore, 1977
