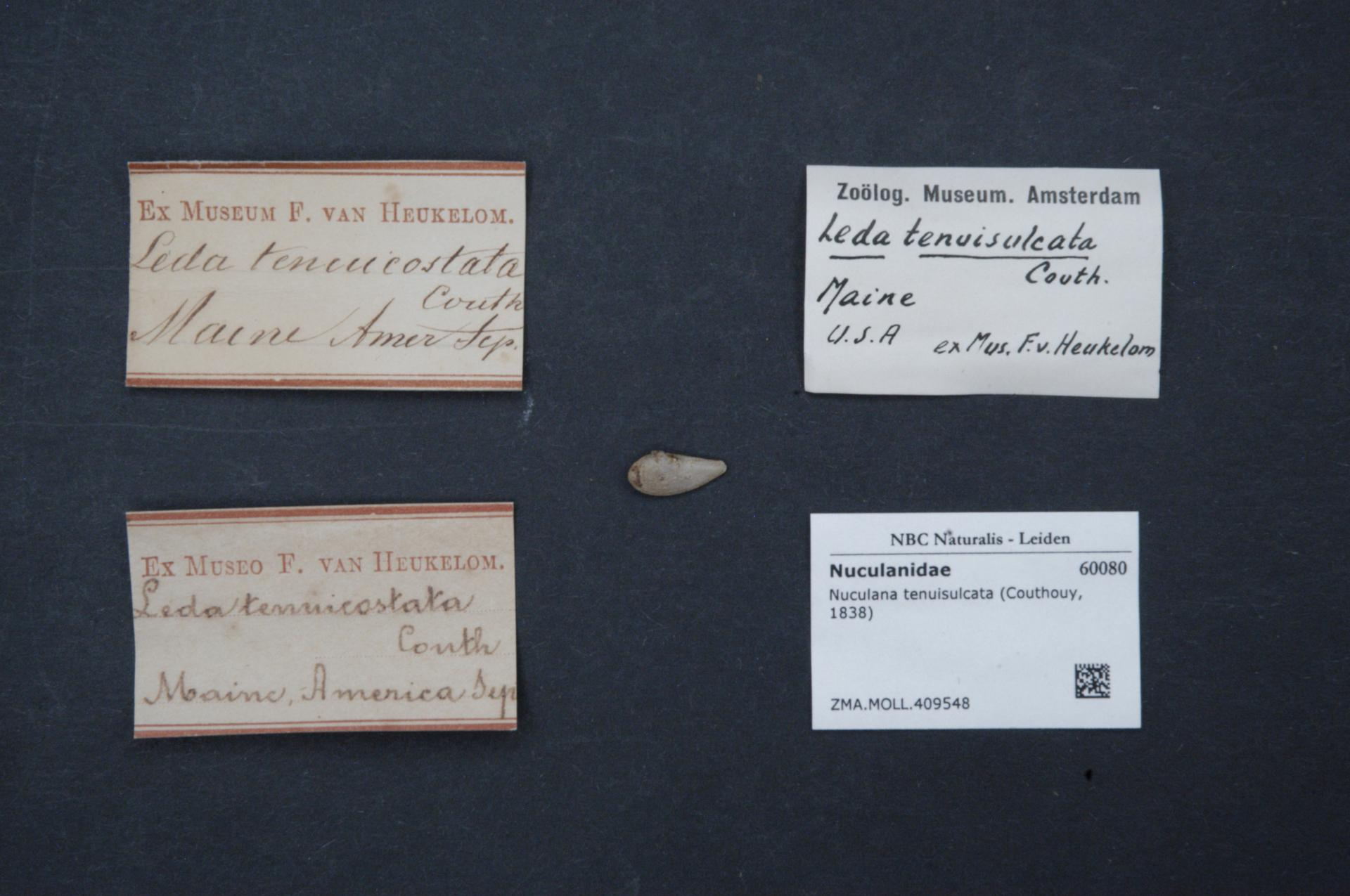

Scientific classification
- Kingdom: Animalia
- Phylum: Mollusca
- Class: Bivalvia
- Order: Nuculanida
- Family: Nuculanidae
- Genus: Nuculana
- Species: N. tenuisulcata

Binomial name
- Nuculana tenuisulcata (Couthouy, 1838)

= Nuculana tenuisulcata =

Species of bivalve

Nuculana tenuisulcata, or the Sulcate nut clam, is a marine bivalve mollusc in the family Nuculanidae. It can be found along the Atlantic coast of North America, ranging from the Gulf of St. Lawrence to Rhode Island.
