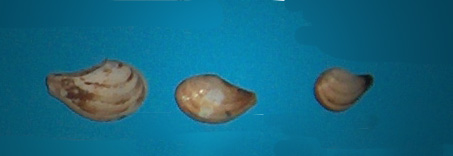

Scientific classification
- Kingdom: Animalia
- Phylum: Mollusca
- Class: Bivalvia
- Order: Nuculanida
- Family: Nuculanidae
- Genus: Nuculana
- Species: N. minuta

Binomial name
- Nuculana minuta (Fabricius, 1776)

= Nuculana minuta =

Species of bivalve

Nuculana minuta, or the Minute nut clam, is a marine bivalve mollusc in the family Nuculanidae.

Its distribution is circum-boreal. It lives in northern parts of the Atlantic both in Europe and North America, as well as in the Northeast Pacific and in subarctic-arctic regions including the White Sea. Along the Atlantic coast of North America, it is found from Labrador to Maine.
