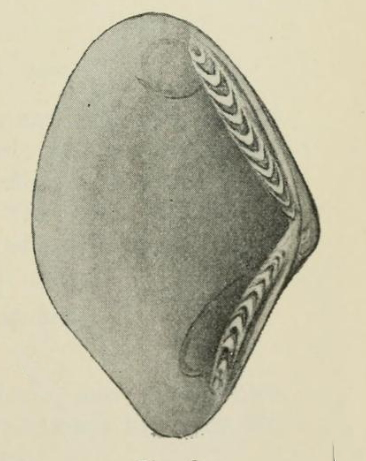
- Shell of Ledella rhomboidea (holotype)

Scientific classification
- Kingdom: Animalia
- Phylum: Mollusca
- Class: Bivalvia
- Order: Nuculanida
- Superfamily: Nuculanoidea
- Family: Nuculanidae
- Genus: Ledella
- Species: †L. rhomboidea

Binomial name
- †Ledella rhomboidea (May, 1922)

Synonyms
- † Nuculana rhomboidea May, 1922

= Ledella rhomboidea =

Extinct species of gastropod

Ledella rhomboidea is an extinct species of marine bivalve mollusk in the family Nuculanidae.

== Description ==
The length of the shell attains 2 mm, its diameter 1.3 mm.

(Original description) The shell is minute, smooth, white and shining. It is rhomboidal, rounded in front, narrowly produced behind into a short beak. The hinge line is arcuate, bearing arrow-shaped teeth, strong on the anterior slope, but less so posteriorly.

== Distribution ==
This extinct marine species is endemic to Tasmania and were found in Tertiary strata.
