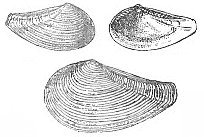
- Nuculana pernula

Scientific classification
- Kingdom: Animalia
- Phylum: Mollusca
- Class: Bivalvia
- Order: Nuculanida
- Family: Nuculanidae
- Genus: Nuculana; Meek, 1864

= Nuculana =

Genus of molluscs

Nuculana is a genus of bivalves in the family Nuculanidae. It includes the following species:

== Species ==
- Nuculana acapulcensis (Pilsbry & Lowe, 1932)
- Nuculana acinacea Habe, 1958
- Nuculana acuta (Conrad, 1832)
- Nuculana aikawai Habe, 1958
- Nuculana amiata
- Nuculana anakena Raines & Huber, 2012
- Nuculana approximans Prashad, 1932
- Nuculana arai Habe, 1958
- Nuculana aspecta
- Nuculana bathybia Prashad, 1932
- Nuculana belcheri (Hinds, 1843)
- Nuculana bellula (A. Adams, 1856)
- Nuculana bicuspidata (Gould, 1845)
- Nuculana bipennis (Dall, 1927)
- Nuculana brookei (Hanley, 1860)
- Nuculana bushiana (A. E. Verrill, 1884)
- Nuculana caloundra Iredale, 1929
- Nuculana caudata (Donovan, 1801)
- Nuculana cellulita (Dall, 1896)
- Nuculana cestrota
- Nuculana comita (Cotton & Godfrey, 1938)
- Nuculana concentrica (Say, 1824)
- Nuculana conceptionis (Dall, 1896)
- Nuculana confusa (Hanley, 1860)
- Nuculana corbuloides (E. A. Smith, 1885)
- Nuculana cordyla (Dall, 1908)
- Nuculana cornidei Altimira, 1974
- Nuculana costellata (G. B. Sowerby I, 1833)
- Nuculana crassa (Hinds, 1843)
- Nuculana crenulata
- Nuculana cuneata (G. B. Sowerby I, 1833)
- Nuculana cygnea (Thiele & Jaeckel, 1931)
- Nuculana dalli
- Nuculana darwini (E. A. Smith, 1884)
- Nuculana dasea (Hedley, 1915)
- Nuculana decora (A. Adams, 1856)
- Nuculana dohrni (Hanley, 1861)
- Nuculana egregia (Guppy, 1882)
- Nuculana elaborata Prashad, 1932
- Nuculana electilis (Hedley, 1915)
- Nuculana ensiformis Scarlato, 1981
- Nuculana extenuata
- Nuculana fastidiosa (A. Adams, 1856)
- Nuculana forticostata Xu, 1991
- Nuculana fortis (Hedley, 1907)
- Nuculana fulgida (A. Adams, 1856)
- Nuculana fumosa E. A. Smith, 1895
- Nuculana gemmulata G. B. Sowerby III, 1904
- Nuculana gomphoidea
- Nuculana gordonis (Yokoyama, 1920)
- Nuculana grasslei
- Nuculana gruveli (Nicklès, 1952)
- Nuculana hamata (Carpenter, 1864)
- Nuculana hebes (E. A. Smith, 1885)
- Nuculana husamaru Nomura, 1940
- Nuculana ikebei Suzuki & Kanehara, 1936
- Nuculana investigator (Dell, 1952)
- Nuculana irradiata (G. B. Sowerby II, 1870)
- Nuculana isikela (Kilburn, 1994)
- Nuculana jamaicensis (d'Orbigny, 1853)
- Nuculana jovis (Thiele & Jaeckel, 1931)
- Nuculana karlmartini Weisbord, 1964
- Nuculana kiiensis Tsuchida & Okutani, 1985
- Nuculana lamellata G. B. Sowerby III, 1904
- Nuculana lanceta (Boshoff, 1968)
- Nuculana larranagai Klappenbach & Scarabino, 1969
- Nuculana leonina (Dall, 1896)
- Nuculana liogona
- Nuculana loshka (Dall, 1908)
- Nuculana mabillei (Dautzenberg & H. Fischer, 1897)
- Nuculana manawatawhia Powell, 1937
- Nuculana marella Hertlein, Hanna & Strong, 1940
- Nuculana mauritiana (G. B. Sowerby I, 1833)
- Nuculana messanensis
- Nuculana micans (Hanley, 1860)
- Nuculana minuta (O. F. Müller, 1776)
- Nuculana modica Prashad, 1932
- Nuculana montagui (Gray, 1825)
- Nuculana navisa (Dall, 1916)
- Nuculana neaeriformis (E. A. Smith, 1885)
- Nuculana neimanae Scarlato, 1981
- Nuculana novaeguineensis (E. A. Smith, 1885)
- Nuculana oculata Iredale, 1925
- Nuculana orixa
- Nuculana ornata
- Nuculana oxia
- Nuculana ovum† (J. De C. Sowerby, 1824)
- Nuculana parsimonia Barnard, 1963
- Nuculana pella (Linnaeus, 1767)
- Nuculana penderi
- Nuculana pernula (O. F. Müller, 1779)
- Nuculana platessa
- Nuculana prostrata (Thiele & Jaeckel, 1931)
- Nuculana puellata (Hinds, 1843)
- Nuculana radiata
- Nuculana ramsayi (E. A. Smith, 1885)
- Nuculana reticulata (Hinds, 1843)
- Nuculana rhytida (Dall, 1908)
- Nuculana robai (Kuroda, 1929)
- Nuculana robsoni Prashad, 1932
- Nuculana sachalinica Scarlato, 1981
- Nuculana scalata Prashad, 1932
- Nuculana sculpta (Issel, 1869)
- Nuculana sematensis Suzuki & Ishizuka, 1943
- Nuculana semen (E. A. Smith, 1885)
- Nuculana sibogai Prashad, 1932
- Nuculana silicula (Thiele & Jaeckel, 1931)
- Nuculana sinensis Xu, 1984
- Nuculana solida (Dall, 1881)
- Nuculana soyoae Habe, 1958
- Nuculana spargana
- Nuculana subaequilatera
- Nuculana sufficientia Poppe & Tagaro, 2016
- Nuculana taiwanica Okutani & Lan, 1998
- Nuculana takaoensis Otsuka, 1936
- Nuculana tamara
- Nuculana tanseimaruae Tsuchida & Okutani, 1985
- Nuculana tashiensis Lan & Lee, 2001
- Nuculana tenuisulcata (Couthouy, 1838)
- Nuculana tuberculata (E. A. Smith, 1872)
- Nuculana ultima (E. A. Smith, 1885)
- Nuculana ventricosa (Hinds, 1843)
- Nuculana verconis (Tate, 1891)
- Nuculana verrilliana (Dall, 1886)
- Nuculana vestita (Locard, 1898)
- Nuculana vitrea (d'Orbigny, 1853)
- Nuculana vulgaris (Brown & Pilsbry, 1913)
- Nuculana watsoni (E. A. Smith, 1885)
- Nuculana whitensis Farinati, 1978
- Nuculana wolffi (Nicklès, 1955)
- Nuculana yokoyamai Kuroda, 1934

The Jurassic species, Nuculana ovum, is notable because 19th century miners working in the alum industry in North Yorkshire used the presence of that bivalve to identify the strata suitable for making alum.
