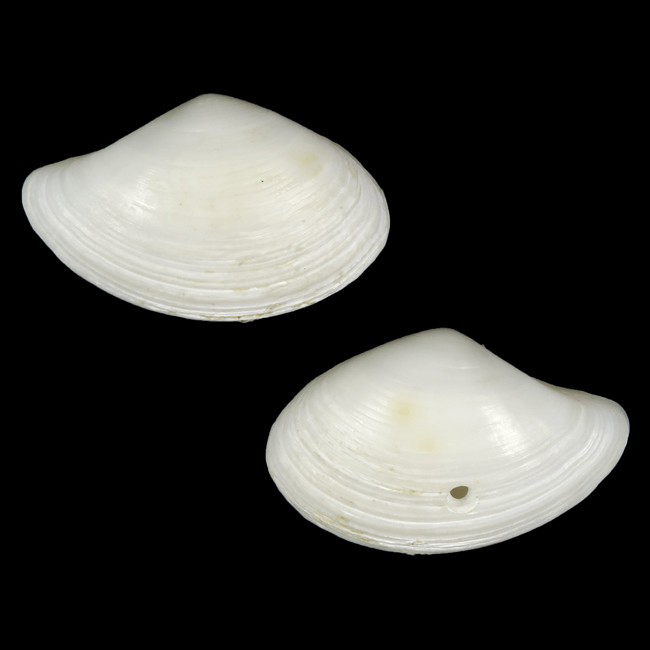
- Shell of Nuculana sufficientia

Scientific classification
- Kingdom: Animalia
- Phylum: Mollusca
- Class: Bivalvia
- Order: Nuculanida
- Superfamily: Nuculanoidea
- Family: Nuculanidae
- Genus: Nuculana
- Species: N. sufficientia

Binomial name
- Nuculana sufficientia Poppe & Tagaro, 2016

= Nuculana sufficientia =

Species of bivalve

Nuculana sufficientia is a species of marine bivalvia mollusc in the family Nuculanidae.

== Distribution ==
This marine species occurs off the Philippines.
