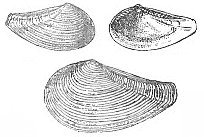

Scientific classification
- Kingdom: Animalia
- Phylum: Mollusca
- Class: Bivalvia
- Order: Nuculanida
- Family: Nuculanidae
- Genus: Nuculana
- Species: N. pernula

Binomial name
- Nuculana pernula (Müller, 1771)

= Nuculana pernula =

Species of bivalve

Nuculana pernula, or Müller's nut clam, is a marine bivalve mollusc in the family Nuculanidae. It can be found along the Atlantic coast of North America, ranging from Massachusetts to Greenland.
