= Nuculana concentrica =

Scientific classification
- Kingdom: Animalia
- Phylum: Mollusca
- Class: Bivalvia
- Order: Nuculanida
- Family: Nuculanidae
- Genus: Nuculana
- Species: N. concentrica

Binomial name
- Nuculana concentrica (Say, 1824)

Species of bivalve

Nuculana concentrica, or the Concentric nut clam, is a marine bivalve mollusc in the family Nuculanidae. It can be found in the waters of the Gulf of Mexico, ranging from Texas to Florida.
