= Nuculana acuta =

Scientific classification
- Kingdom: Animalia
- Phylum: Mollusca
- Class: Bivalvia
- Order: Nuculanida
- Family: Nuculanidae
- Genus: Nuculana
- Species: N. acuta

Binomial name
- Nuculana acuta (Conrad, 1831)

Species of bivalve

Nuculana acuta, or the pointed nut clam, is a marine bivalve mollusc in the family Nuculanidae. It can be found along the Atlantic coast of North America, ranging from Massachusetts to Texas, including the West Indies.
