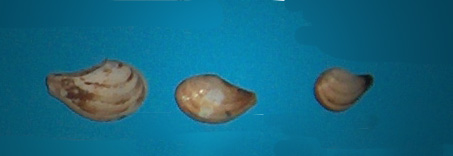
- Three shells of Nuculana minuta

Scientific classification
- Kingdom: Animalia
- Phylum: Mollusca
- Class: Bivalvia
- Order: Nuculanida
- Superfamily: Nuculanoidea
- Family: Nuculanidae; H. Adams & A. Adams, 1858

Genera
- See text

= Nuculanidae =

Nuculanidae Temporal range: Permian to Present

Family of bivalves

Nuculanidae is a family of small saltwater clams, marine bivalve molluscs in the order Nuculanida. Species in this family are found in all seas, from shallow to deep water.

== Genera and species ==
Genera and species within the family Nuculanidae include:

- Acutispinula
  - Acutispinula hilleri (Allen & Sanders, 1982)
  - Acutispinula scheltemai (Allen & Sanders, 1982)
- Adrana H. Adams & A. Adams, 1858
- Jupiteria
  - Jupiteria manawatawhia Powell, 1937)
  - Jupiteria wolffi Dell, 1956
  - Jupiteria zealedaformis Dell, 1953
- Ledella
  - Ledella aberrata Allen & Sanders, 1996
  - Ledella finlayi Powell, 1935
  - Ledella herdmani Dell, 1953
  - Ledella jamesi Allen & Hannah, 1989
  - Ledella librata Dell, 1952
  - Ledella pustulosa Allen & Hannah, 1989
  - † Ledella rhomboidea (May, 1922)
  - Ledella sublevis A. E. Verrill & Bush, 1898
  - Ledella ultima (E. A. Smith, 1885)
- Lembulus Link, 1807
  - Lembulus pellus (Linnaeus, 1767)
- Nuculana
  - Nuculana acuta (Conrad, 1832)
  - Nuculana aspecta (Dall, 1927)
  - Nuculana bipennis (Dall, 1927)
  - Nuculana bushiana (A. E. Verrill, 1884)
  - Nuculana caudata (Donovan, 1801)
  - Nuculana cestrota (Dall, 1890)
  - Nuculana concentrica (Say, 1824)
  - Nuculana eborea Conrad, 1848
  - Nuculana fortiana Esteves, 1984
  - Nuculana hebes (E. A. Smith, 1885)
  - Nuculana inaequisculpta Lamy, 1906
  - Nuculana jamaicensis (d’Orbigny in Sagra, 1853)
  - Nuculana kalmartini Weisbord, 1964
  - Nuculana larranagai Klappenbach & Scarabino, 1969
  - Nuculana marella Weisbord, 1964
  - Nuculana minuta (O. F. Müller, 1776)
  - Nuculana orixa (Dall, 1927)
  - Nuculana parva (G. B. Sowerby I, 1833)
  - Nuculana pernula (Müller, 1779)
  - Nuculana platessa (Dall, 1890)
  - Nuculana pusio (Philippi, 1844)
  - Nuculana rhytida Dall, 1908
  - Nuculana semen (E. A. Smith, 1885)
  - Nuculana solidifacta (Dall, 1886)
  - Nuculana solidula (E. A. Smith, 1885)
  - Nuculana sufficientia Poppe & Tagaro, 2016
  - Nuculana taphria (Dall, 1898)
  - Nuculana tenuisulcata (Couthouy, 1838)
  - Nuculana verrilliana (Dall, 1886)
  - Nuculana vitrea (d'Orbigny in Sagra, 1853)
  - Nuculana vulgaris Pilsbry & Brown, 1913
  - Nuculana whitensis Farinati, 1978
- Poroleda
  - Poroleda lanceolata (Hutton, 1885)
- Saccella
- Scissuladrana
  - Scissuladrana ludmillae Petuch, 1987
- Thestyleda
  - Thestyleda investigator Dell, 1952)
  - Thestyleda louiseae (Clarke, 1962)
- Tindariopsis
  - Tindariopsis sulculata (‘Couthouy’ Gould, 1852)

Fossil taxa:

- Dacromya
