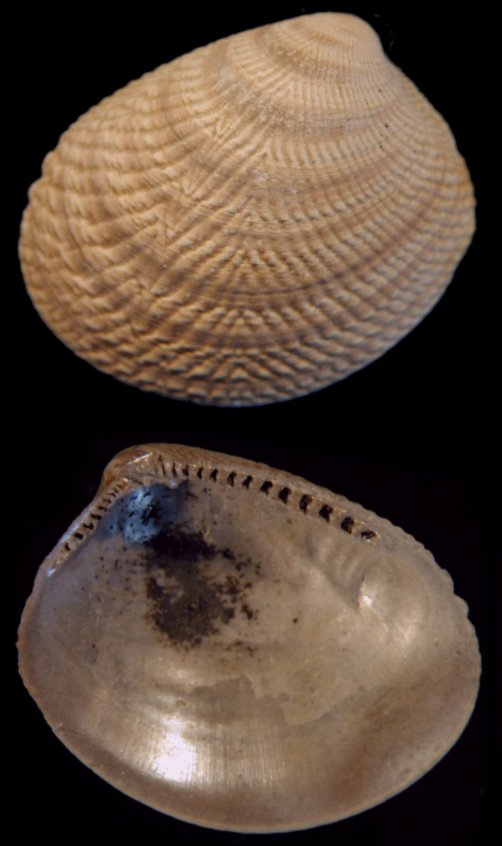
- Two views of a left valve of Acila cobboldiae from the early Pleistocene of the Netherlands

Scientific classification
- Kingdom: Animalia
- Phylum: Mollusca
- Class: Bivalvia
- Order: Nuculida
- Superfamily: Nuculoidea
- Family: Nuculidae; Gray, 1824

Genera
- See text

= Nuculidae =

Nuculidae Temporal range: Paleozoic to Present

Family of bivalves

Nuculidae is a family of small saltwater clams in the order Nuculida. Species in this family are commonly known as nut clams.

The nomenclature of the Western European species in this family is still uncertain. Their systematics have been based mainly on their feces.

== Genera ==
- Acila H. Adams and A. Adams, 1858
- Adrana Adams and Adams, 1858
- Austronucula Powell, 1939
- Brevinucula Thiele, 1934
- Condylonucula D.R. Moore, 1977
- Ennucula Iredale, 1931
- Lamellinucula Schenck, 1944
- Leionucula Quenstedt, 1930 †
- Linucula Marwick, 1931
- Neonucula Lan & Lee, 2001
- Nucula Lamarck, 1799
- Pronucula Hedley, 1902
- Sinonucula Xu, 1985

Genera brought into synonymy

- Lionucula Thiele, 1934 synonym of Ennucula Iredale, 1931
- Nuculoma Cossmann, 1907 : synonym of Ennucula Iredale, 1931
- Polyodonta Megerle von Mühlfeld, 1811 : synonym of Nucula Lamarck, 1799
