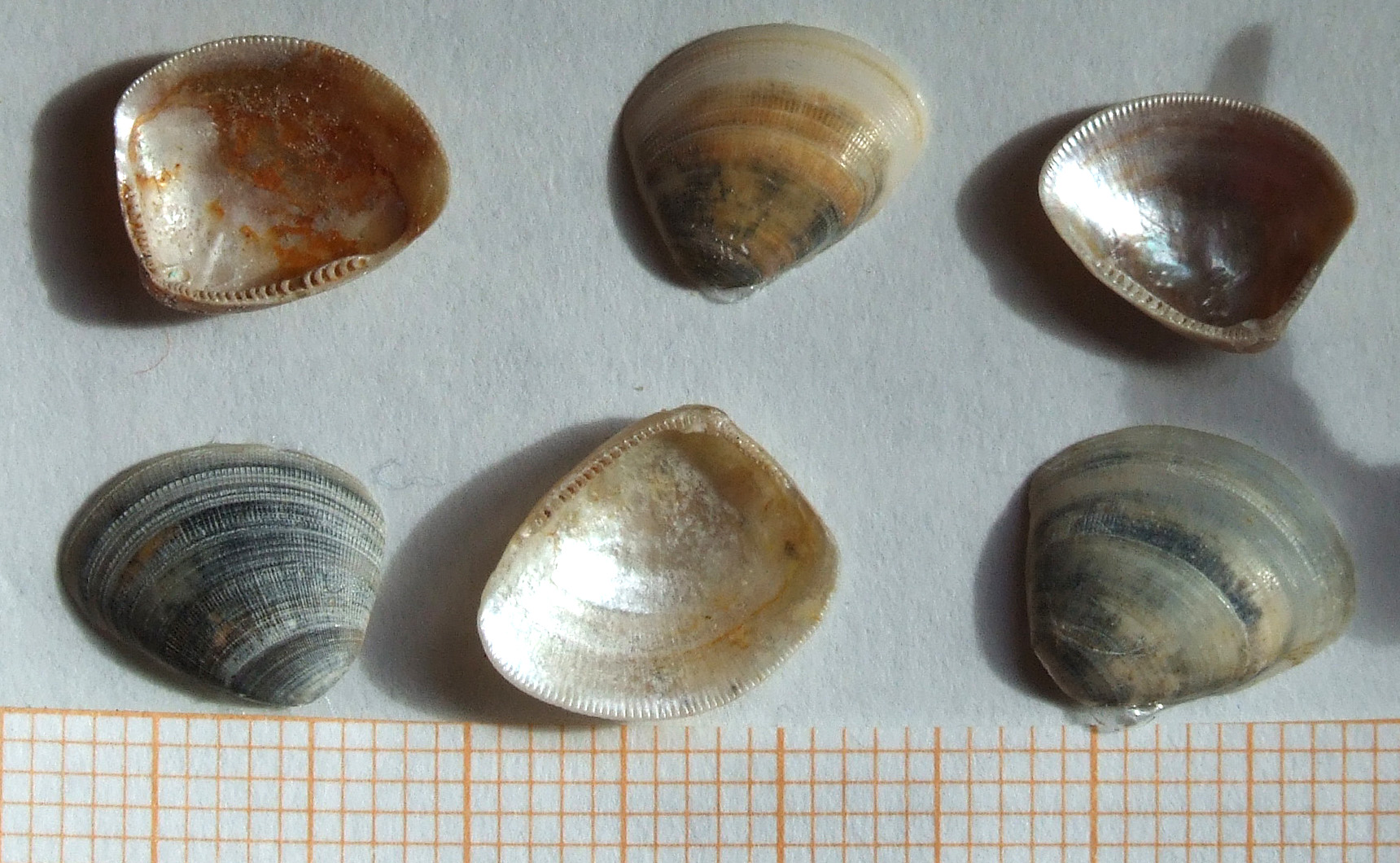
- Nucula nucleus

Scientific classification
- Kingdom: Animalia
- Phylum: Mollusca
- Class: Bivalvia
- Order: Nuculida; Dall, 1889
- Superfamily: Nuculoidea; Gray, 1824

Families
- Nuculidae; †Praenuculidae

Synonyms
- Palaeotaxodonta; Nuculoida

= Nuculida =

Order of bivalves

Nuculida is an order of small saltwater clams, marine bivalve mollusks, within the subclass Protobranchia. "Nuculida" is sometimes spelled "Nuculoida". This order contains a single superfamily, Nuculoidea, which encompasses two families, the extant Nuculidae and the extinct Praenuculidae. Clams in the family Nuculidae are commonly known as nut clams.
