= Falsilunatia falklandica =

Scientific classification
- Kingdom: Animalia
- Phylum: Mollusca
- Class: Gastropoda
- Subclass: Caenogastropoda
- Order: Littorinimorpha
- Family: Naticidae
- Genus: Falsilunatia
- Species: F. falklandica

Binomial name
- Falsilunatia falklandica (Preston, 1913)

Species of gastropod

Falsilunatia falklandica is a species of predatory sea snail, a marine gastropod mollusc in the family Naticidae, the moon snails.
