= Friginatica conjuncta =

Scientific classification
- Kingdom: Animalia
- Phylum: Mollusca
- Class: Gastropoda
- Subclass: Caenogastropoda
- Order: Littorinimorpha
- Family: Naticidae
- Genus: Friginatica
- Species: F. conjuncta

Binomial name
- Friginatica conjuncta Dell, 1953

Species of gastropod

Friginatica conjuncta is a species of small deepwater sea snail, a marine gastropod mollusc in the family Naticidae.
