= Sigatica semisulcata =

Scientific classification
- Kingdom: Animalia
- Phylum: Mollusca
- Class: Gastropoda
- Subclass: Caenogastropoda
- Order: Littorinimorpha
- Family: Naticidae
- Genus: Sigatica
- Species: S. semisulcata

Binomial name
- Sigatica semisulcata (Gray, 1839)

Species of gastropod

Sigatica semisulcata is a species of predatory sea snail, a marine gastropod mollusk in the family Naticidae, the moon snails.

== Description ==
The maximum recorded shell length is 15 mm.

== Habitat ==
Minimum recorded depth is 0 m. Maximum recorded depth is 60 m.
