= Falsilunatia notorcadensis =

Scientific classification
- Kingdom: Animalia
- Phylum: Mollusca
- Class: Gastropoda
- Subclass: Caenogastropoda
- Order: Littorinimorpha
- Family: Naticidae
- Genus: Falsilunatia
- Species: F. notorcadensis

Binomial name
- Falsilunatia notorcadensis Dell, 1990

Species of gastropod

Falsilunatia notorcadensis is a species of predatory sea snail, a marine gastropod mollusc in the family Naticidae, the moon snails.

== Description ==
The maximum recorded shell length is 29 mm.

== Habitat ==
Minimum recorded depth is 302 m. Maximum recorded depth is 604 m.
