= Falsilunatia eltanini =

Scientific classification
- Kingdom: Animalia
- Phylum: Mollusca
- Class: Gastropoda
- Subclass: Caenogastropoda
- Order: Littorinimorpha
- Family: Naticidae
- Genus: Falsilunatia
- Species: F. eltanini

Binomial name
- Falsilunatia eltanini Dell, 1990

Species of gastropod

Falsilunatia eltanini is a species of predatory sea snail, a marine gastropod mollusc in the family Naticidae, the moon snails.

== Description ==
The maximum recorded shell length is 18.5 mm.

== Habitat ==
Minimum recorded depth is 2452 m. Maximum recorded depth is 2818 m.
