= Payraudeautia nubila =

Scientific classification
- Kingdom: Animalia
- Phylum: Mollusca
- Class: Gastropoda
- Subclass: Caenogastropoda
- Order: Littorinimorpha
- Family: Naticidae
- Genus: Payraudeautia
- Species: P. nubaus

Binomial name
- Payraudeautia nubaus (Dall, 1889)

Synonyms
- Natica nubila Dall, 1889 (basionym); Polinices nubilus (Dall, 1889)

Species of gastropod

Payraudeautia nubila is a species of predatory sea snail, a marine gastropod mollusk in the family Naticidae, the moon snails.

== Distribution ==
This species occurs in the Caribbean Sea, the Gulf of Mexico and off Puerto Rico.

== Description ==
The maximum recorded shell length is 13 mm.

== Habitat ==
Minimum recorded depth is 40 m. Maximum recorded depth is 347 m.
