= Eunaticina africana =

Scientific classification
- Kingdom: Animalia
- Phylum: Mollusca
- Class: Gastropoda
- Subclass: Caenogastropoda
- Order: Littorinimorpha
- Family: Naticidae
- Genus: Eunaticina
- Species: E. africana

Binomial name
- Eunaticina africana Fernandes & Burnay, 1984

Species of gastropod

Eunaticina africana is a species of predatory sea snail, a marine gastropod mollusc in the family Naticidae, the moon snails.
