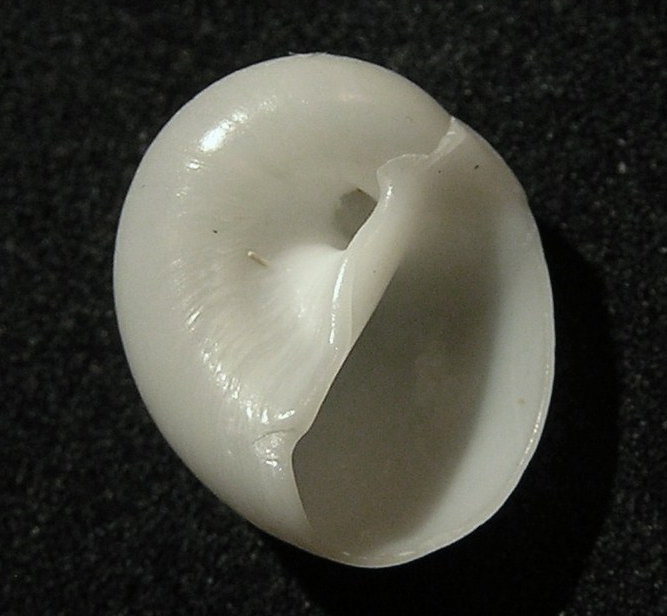
- Shell of Eunaticina albosutura

Scientific classification
- Kingdom: Animalia
- Phylum: Mollusca
- Class: Gastropoda
- Subclass: Caenogastropoda
- Order: Littorinimorpha
- Superfamily: Naticoidea
- Family: Naticidae
- Genus: Eunaticina; Fischer, 1885

Type species
- Nerita papilla Gmelin, 1791

Synonyms
- Eunaticina (Eunaticina) P. Fischer, 1885 · accepted, alternate representation; Heliconatica Dall, 1924; Natica (Eunaticina) P. Fischer, 1885; Naticina Gray, 1847 (Invalid: junior homonym of Naticina Guilding, 1834; Eunaticina P. Fischer, 1885 is a replacement name); Pervisinum Iredale, 1931; Propesinum Iredale, 1924; Sigaretus (Eunaticina) P. Fischer, 1885; Sigaretus (Naticina) Gray, 1847; Sinum (Eunaticina) P. Fischer, 1885

= Eunaticina =

Genus of gastropods

Eunaticina is a genus of predatory sea snails, marine gastropod mollusks in the subfamily Sininae of the family Naticidae, the moon snails.

== Species ==
Species within the genus Eunaticina include:

- Eunaticina africana Fernandes & Burnay
- Eunaticina albosutura Verco, 1909
- † Eunaticina auriformis (Marwick, 1924)
- Eunaticina emmeles (Melvill, 1910)
- † Eunaticina fornicata (Suter, 1917)
- Eunaticina heimi Jordan & Hertlein, 1934
- Eunaticina inflata (Tesch, 1920)
- Eunaticina kraussi (E. A. Smith, 1902)
- Eunaticina linnaeana (Récluz, 1843)
- Eunaticina margaritaeformis Dall, 1924
- Eunaticina mienisi Kilburn, 1988
- Eunaticina oblonga Reeve, 1864
- Eunaticina papilla (Gmelin, 1791)
- Eunaticina umbilicata (Quoy & Gaimard, 1833)

Species brought into synonymy

- † Eunaticina abyssalis Simone, 2014: synonym of † Janthina typica (Bronn, 1861)
- Eunaticina cincta (Hutton, 1885): synonym of Eunaticina papilla (Gmelin, 1791)
- Eunaticina coarctata (Reeve, 1864): synonym of Eunaticina papilla (Gmelin, 1791)
- Eunaticina intercisum (Iredale, 1931): synonym of Gennaeosinum intercisum Iredale, 1931
- Eunaticina lamarckiana (Récluz, 1843): synonym of Eunaticina papilla lamarckiana (Récluz, 1843)
- Eunaticina mienisi Kilburn, 1988: synonym of Sigatica mienisi (Kilburn, 1988) (original combination)
- Eunaticina parvula Bozzetti, 2019: synonym of Vanikoro parvula (Bozzetti, 2019) (original combination)
- Eunaticina peleum (Iredale, 1929): synonym of Gennaeosinum peleum Iredale, 1929
- Eunaticina perobliqua (Dautzenberg and Fischer, 1906): synonym of Gennaeosinum perobliquum (Dautzenberg & Fischer, 1906)
- Eunaticina pomatiella Melvill, 1892: synonym of Sigatica pomatiella (Melvill, 1893)
