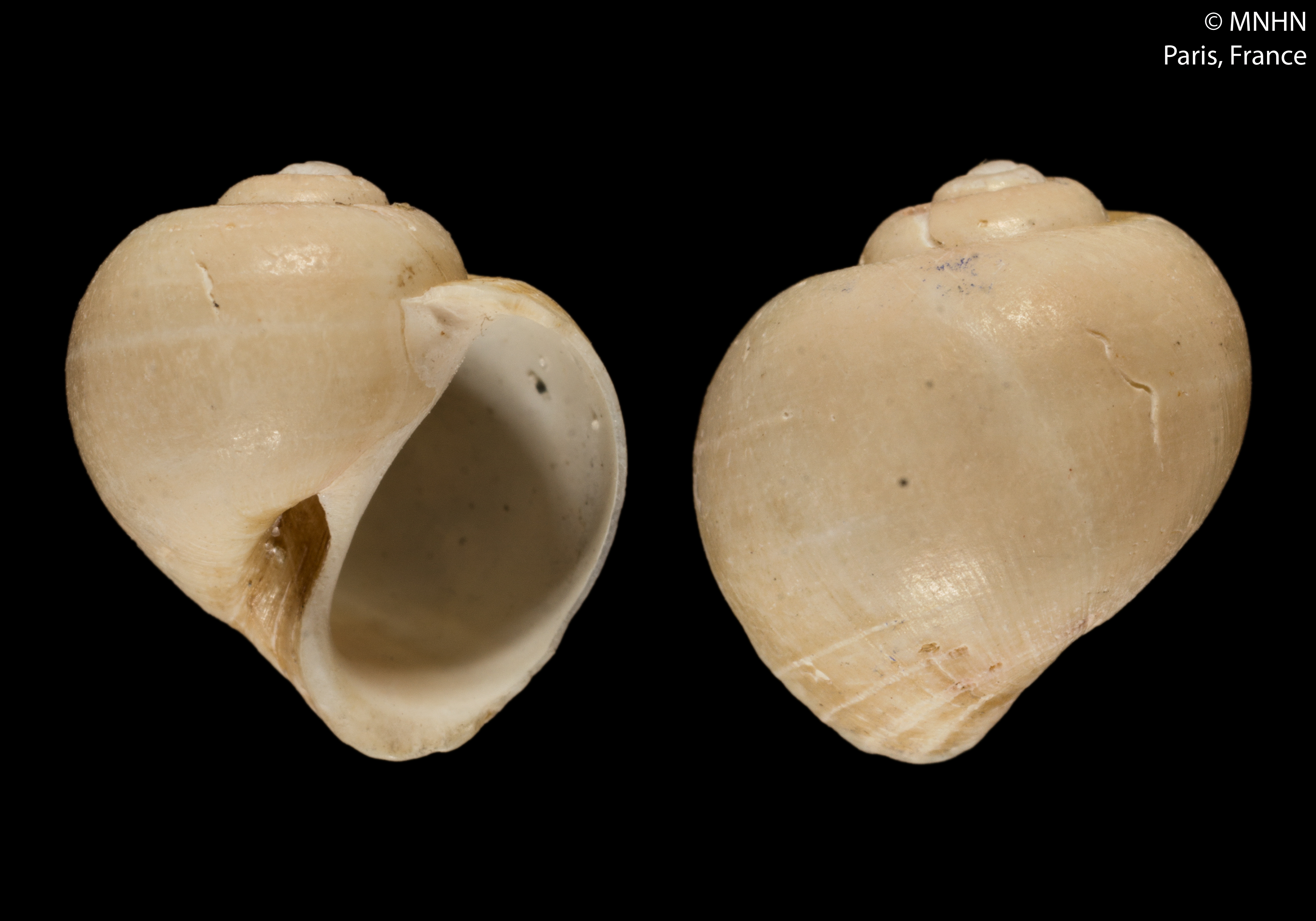
- Falsilunatia patagonica

Scientific classification
- Kingdom: Animalia
- Phylum: Mollusca
- Class: Gastropoda
- Subclass: Caenogastropoda
- Order: Littorinimorpha
- Superfamily: Naticoidea
- Family: Naticidae
- Genus: Falsilunatia; Powell, 1951

Type species
- Natica soluta Gould, 1848

= Falsilunatia =

Genus of gastropods

Falsilunatia is a genus of sea snails, marine gastropod molluscs in the subfamily Globisininae of the family Naticidae, which are known as moon snails or moon shells.

== Species ==
Species within the genus Falsilunatia include:

- Falsilunatia ambigua (Suter)
- Falsilunatia amphiala (R. B. Watson, 1881)
- Falsilunatia benthicola (Dell, 1990)
- Falsilunatia carcellesi (Dell, 1990)
- Falsilunatia eltanini Dell, 1990
- Falsilunatia falklandica (Preston, 1913)
- Falsilunatia fartilis (Watson, 1881)
- Falsilunatia joubini (Lamy, 1911)
- Falsilunatia nigromaculata (Lamy, 1911)
- Falsilunatia notorcadensis Dell, 1990
- Falsilunatia patagonica (Philippi, 1845)
- Falsilunatia pisum (Hedley, 1916)
- Falsilunatia pseudopsila Barnard, 1963
- Falsilunatia scotiana (Dell, 1990)
- Falsilunatia xantha (Watson, 1881)

Species brought into synonymy

- Falsilunatia delicatula Dell, 1990: synonym of Kerguelenatica delicatula (E. A. Smith, 1902)
- Falsilunatia powelli Dell, 1956: synonym of Falsilunatia ambigua (Suter, 1913)
- Falsilunatia soluta (Gould, 1848): synonym of Falsilunatia patagonica (Philippi, 1845)
- Falsilunatia subperforata Dell, 1956: synonym of Amauropsis subperforata (Dell, 1956)
