= Sigatica mienisi =

Scientific classification
- Kingdom: Animalia
- Phylum: Mollusca
- Class: Gastropoda
- Subclass: Caenogastropoda
- Order: Littorinimorpha
- Family: Naticidae
- Genus: Sigatica
- Species: S. mienisi

Binomial name
- Sigatica mienisi (Kilburn, 1988)

Synonyms
- Eunaticina (Gennaeosinum) mienisi Kilburn, 1988; Eunaticina mienisi Kilburn, 1988

Species of gastropod

Sigatica mienisi is a species of predatory sea snail, a marine gastropod mollusk in the family Naticidae, the moon snails.
