= Payraudeautia intricata =

Scientific classification
- Kingdom: Animalia
- Phylum: Mollusca
- Class: Gastropoda
- Subclass: Caenogastropoda
- Order: Littorinimorpha
- Family: Naticidae
- Genus: Payraudeautia
- Species: P. intricata

Binomial name
- Payraudeautia intricata (Donovan, 1804)

Species of gastropod

Payraudeautia intricata is a species of predatory sea snail, a marine gastropod mollusk in the family Naticidae, the moon snails.
