= Sinuber sculptum =

Scientific classification
- Kingdom: Animalia
- Phylum: Mollusca
- Class: Gastropoda
- Subclass: Caenogastropoda
- Order: Littorinimorpha
- Family: Naticidae
- Genus: Sinuber
- Species: S. sculptum

Binomial name
- Sinuber sculptum (Martens, 1878)

Species of gastropod

Sinuber sculptum is a species of predatory sea snail, a marine gastropod mollusc in the family Naticidae, the moon snails.

== Description ==
The maximum recorded shell length is 9.5 mm.

== Habitat ==
Minimum recorded depth is 94 m. Maximum recorded depth is 855 m.
