= Falsilunatia subperforata =

Scientific classification
- Kingdom: Animalia
- Phylum: Mollusca
- Class: Gastropoda
- Subclass: Caenogastropoda
- Order: Littorinimorpha
- Family: Naticidae
- Genus: Falsilunatia
- Species: F. subperforata

Binomial name
- Falsilunatia subperforata Dell, 1956

Synonyms
- Amauropsis subperforata (Dell, 1956)

Species of gastropod

Falsilunatia subperforata is a deepwater species of sea snail, a marine gastropod mollusc in the family Naticidae.
