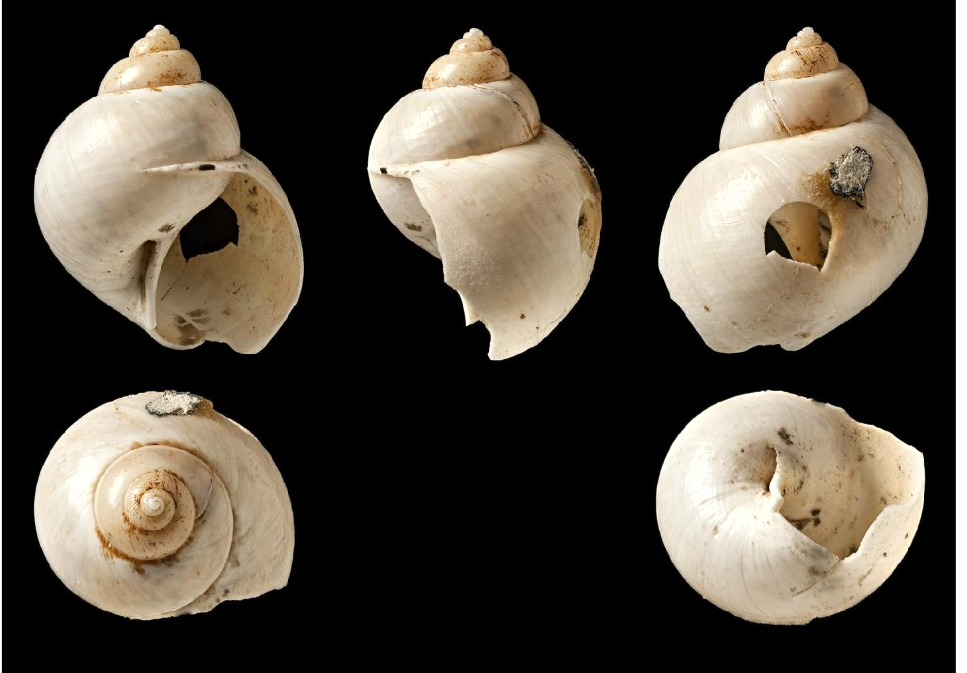
- Shell of Laguncula pulchella (holotype at the Natural History Museum, London)

Scientific classification
- Kingdom: Animalia
- Phylum: Mollusca
- Class: Gastropoda
- Subclass: Caenogastropoda
- Order: Littorinimorpha
- Family: Naticidae
- Genus: Laguncula
- Species: L. pulchella

Binomial name
- Laguncula pulchella Benson, 1842

Synonyms
- Euspira fortunei (Reeve, 1855); Lunatia gilva (Philippi, 1851); Natica fortunei Reeve, 1855; Natica gilva Philippi, 1851; Natica tenuis Philippi, 1852

= Laguncula pulchella =

Species of gastropod

Laguncula pulchella is a species of predatory sea snail, a marine gastropod mollusk in the family Naticidae.

== Description ==
(Original description in Latin) The shell is whitish-glaucous (pale greenish-blue) and ovate-globose (ovoid and somewhat spherical). It is furnished with convex whorls. The surface shows a decussate (cross-hatched) sculpture, which consists of slightly elevated longitudinal lines and oblique lines. The sutures are impressed. The aperture is decorated internally with a broad, pale chestnut band. The columella is of the same color internally.

== Distribution ==
This marine species occurs off Korea and Japan.
