= Friginatica =

Scientific classification
- Kingdom: Animalia
- Phylum: Mollusca
- Class: Gastropoda
- Subclass: Caenogastropoda
- Order: Littorinimorpha
- Family: Naticidae
- Genus: Friginatica; Hedley, 1916

Species
- See text.

Genus of gastropods

Friginatica is a genus of sea snails, marine gastropod molluscs in the family Naticidae, the moon shells.

== Species ==
Species within the genus Friginatica include:

- Friginatica aldingensis (Tate 1893)
- Friginatica amphiala (Watson, 1881)
- Friginatica beddomei (Johnston, 1885)
- Friginatica conjuncta Dell, 1953
- Friginatica wintlei
