= Falsilunatia scotiana =

Scientific classification
- Kingdom: Animalia
- Phylum: Mollusca
- Class: Gastropoda
- Subclass: Caenogastropoda
- Order: Littorinimorpha
- Family: Naticidae
- Genus: Falsilunatia
- Species: F. scotiana

Binomial name
- Falsilunatia scotiana (Dell, 1990)

Synonyms
- Bulbus scotianus Dell, 1990 (basionym)

Species of gastropod

Falsilunatia scotiana is a species of predatory sea snail, a marine gastropod mollusc in the family Naticidae, the moon snails.

== Description ==
The snail's maximum recorded shell length is 27.6 millimetres (1.1 in).

== Habitat ==
Falsilunatia scotianus has been found at a minimum recorded sea depth of 73 metres (240 ft), and a maximum recorded depth of 298 metres (978 ft).
