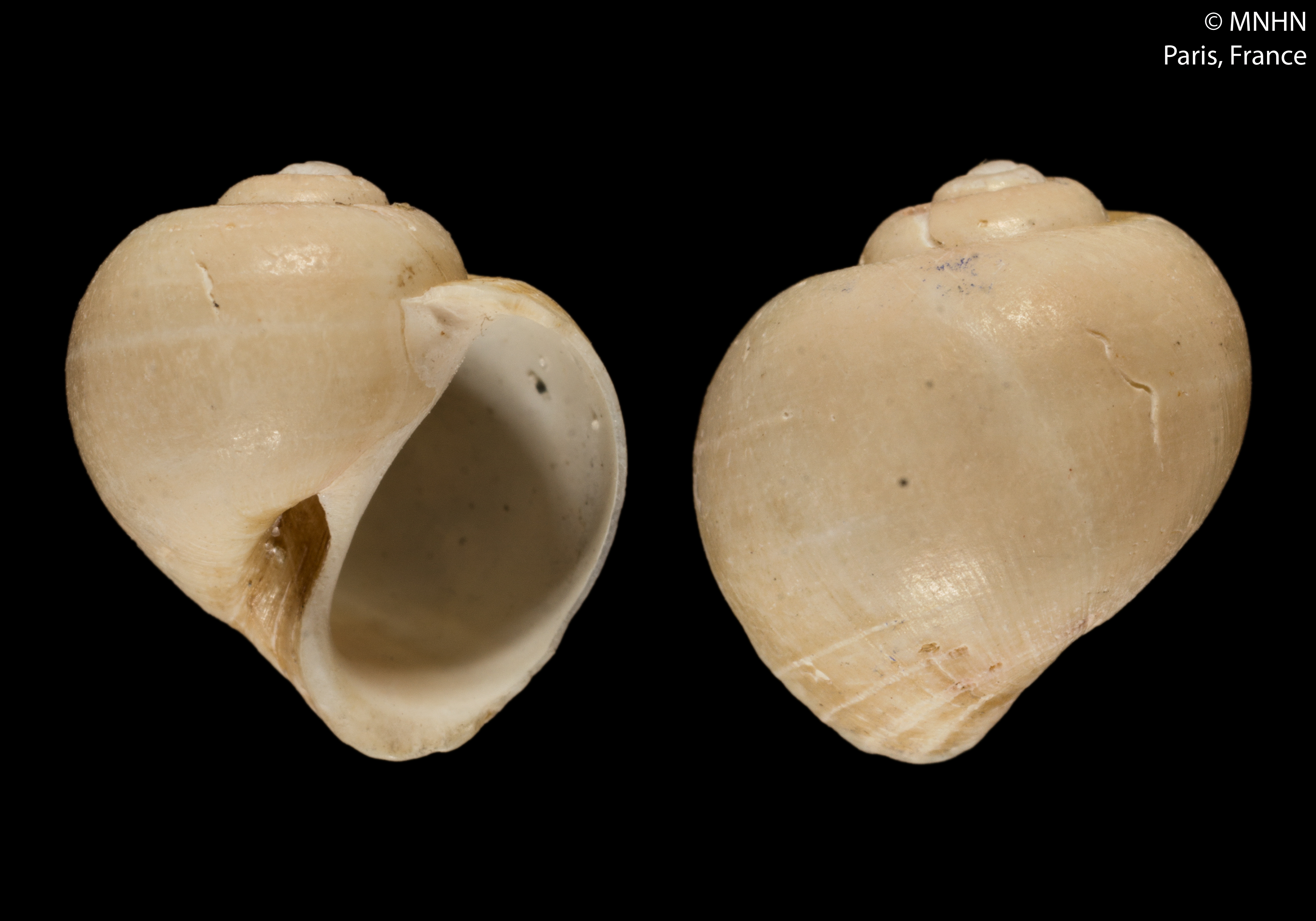

Scientific classification
- Kingdom: Animalia
- Phylum: Mollusca
- Class: Gastropoda
- Subclass: Caenogastropoda
- Order: Littorinimorpha
- Family: Naticidae
- Genus: Falsilunatia
- Species: F. patagonica

Binomial name
- Falsilunatia patagonica (Philippi, 1845)

Synonyms
- Falsilunatia soluta (Gould, 1848); Natica patagonica Philippi, 1845 (basionym); Natica recognita Rochebrune & Mabille, 1889

= Falsilunatia patagonica =

Species of gastropod

Falsilunatia patagonica is a species of predatory sea snail, a marine gastropod mollusc in the family Naticidae, the moon snails.

== Distribution ==
This marine species occurs off the Falklands, Argentina, Tierra del Fuego, the Strait of Magellan, Chile and South Georgia .

== Description ==
The size of an adult shell varies between 12 mm and 30 mm.

== Habitat ==
Minimum recorded depth is 18 m. Maximum recorded depth is 1886 m.
