= Falsilunatia benthicola =

Scientific classification
- Kingdom: Animalia
- Phylum: Mollusca
- Class: Gastropoda
- Subclass: Caenogastropoda
- Order: Littorinimorpha
- Family: Naticidae
- Genus: Falsilunatia
- Species: F. benthicola

Binomial name
- Falsilunatia benthicola (Dell, 1990)

Synonyms
- Bulbus benthicolus Dell, 1990 (basionym)

Species of gastropod

Falsilunatia benthicola is a species of predatory sea snail, a marine gastropod mollusc in the family Naticidae, the moon snails.

== Description ==
The maximum recorded shell length is 23 mm.

== Habitat ==
Minimum recorded depth is 3510 m. Maximum recorded depth is 3980 m.
