= Sigatica cubana =

Scientific classification
- Kingdom: Animalia
- Phylum: Mollusca
- Class: Gastropoda
- Subclass: Caenogastropoda
- Order: Littorinimorpha
- Family: Naticidae
- Genus: Sigatica
- Species: S. cubana

Binomial name
- Sigatica cubana Espinosa, Ortea & Fernadez-Garcés, 2007

Species of gastropod

Sigatica cubana is a species of predatory sea snail, a marine gastropod mollusk in the family Naticidae, the moon snails.
