= Payraudeautia =

Scientific classification
- Kingdom: Animalia
- Phylum: Mollusca
- Class: Gastropoda
- Subclass: Caenogastropoda
- Order: Littorinimorpha
- Family: Naticidae
- Genus: Payraudeautia; Bucquoy, Dautzenberg & Dollfus, 1883

Genus of gastropods

Payraudeautia is a genus of predatory sea snails, marine gastropod mollusks in the family Naticidae, the moon snails. Some sources treat this as a synonym of Euspira, and the World Register of Marine Species considers it a taxon inquirendum.

== Species ==
Species accepted the genus Payraudeautia include:

- Payraudeautia intricata (Donovan, 1804)
- Payraudeautia nubila (Dall, 1889)

Species brought into synonymy:

- Payraudeautia alleryana Sulliotti, 1889, accepted as Payraudeautia intricata (Donovan, 1804)
- Payraudeautia esterias P. Bernard, 1983, accepted as Natica gruveli Dautzenberg, 1910
- Payraudeautia gruveli (Dautzenberg, 1910), accepted as Natica gruveli Dautzenberg, 1910
- Payraudeautia peloritana Sulliotti, 1889, accepted as Payraudeautia intricata (Donovan, 1804)
- Payraudeautia similis Monterosato, 1884, accepted as Payraudeautia intricata (Donovan, 1804)
