= Spironema =

Spironema may refer to:

Animals:

- Spironema (gastropod), Spironema Meek, 1864 – a genus of Cretaceous sea snails

Plants:

- Spironema Raf. [1838] – sometimes considered a synonym of Cassytha L. (Lauraceae)
- Spironema Lindl. [1840] nom. illeg. hom. – a synonym of Callisia Loefl. (Commelinaceae)
- Spironema Hochst. [1842] nom. illeg. hom. – a synonym of Clerodendrum L. (Lamiaceae)

Protists:

- Spironema (flagellate), Spironema Klebs, 1893 nom. illeg. hom. – a synonym of Spironematella P. C. Silva, a genus of flagellate protists in the family Spironemidae.

Spirochaetes:

- Spironema Vuillemin, 1905 – a synonym of Treponema Schaudinn, 1905

Microsporidia:

- Spironema Léger & Hesse, 1924 – a synonym of Toxoglugea Léger & Hesse, 1924
