= Pseudopolinices nanus =

Scientific classification
- Kingdom: Animalia
- Phylum: Mollusca
- Class: Gastropoda
- Subclass: Caenogastropoda
- Order: Littorinimorpha
- Family: Naticidae
- Genus: Pseudopolinices
- Species: P. nanus

Binomial name
- Pseudopolinices nanus (Møller, 1842)

Synonyms
- Euspira nana (Møller, 1842); Natica nana Møller, 1842 (basionym); Neverita nana (Møller, 1842)

Species of gastropod

Pseudopolinices nanus is a species of predatory sea snail, a marine gastropod mollusk in the family Naticidae, the moon snails.

== Distribution ==
This species occurs in European waters and in the Northwest Atlantic Ocean.
