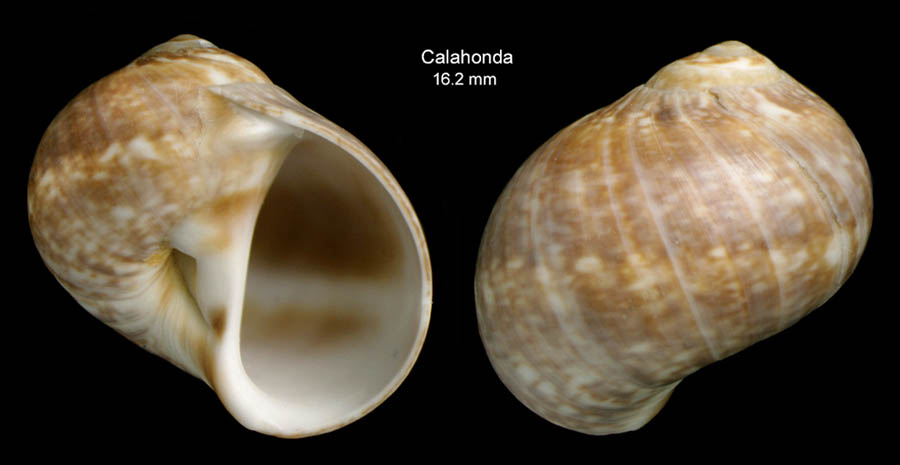
- Shell of Natica prietoi

Scientific classification
- Kingdom: Animalia
- Phylum: Mollusca
- Class: Gastropoda
- Subclass: Caenogastropoda
- Order: Littorinimorpha
- Family: Naticidae
- Genus: Natica
- Species: N. prietoi

Binomial name
- Natica prietoi (Hidalgo, 1873)

= Natica prietoi =

Species of gastropod

Natica prietoi is a species of predatory sea snail, a marine gastropod mollusc in the family Naticidae.
