= Falsilunatia pisum =

Scientific classification
- Kingdom: Animalia
- Phylum: Mollusca
- Class: Gastropoda
- Subclass: Caenogastropoda
- Order: Littorinimorpha
- Family: Naticidae
- Genus: Falsilunatia
- Species: F. pisum

Binomial name
- Falsilunatia pisum (Hedley, 1916)

Species of gastropod

Falsilunatia pisum is a species of small deepwater sea snail, a marine gastropod mollusc in the family Naticidae, the moon snails.
