= Sigatica carolinensis =

Scientific classification
- Kingdom: Animalia
- Phylum: Mollusca
- Class: Gastropoda
- Subclass: Caenogastropoda
- Order: Littorinimorpha
- Family: Naticidae
- Genus: Sigatica
- Species: S. carolinensis

Binomial name
- Sigatica carolinensis (Dall, 1889)

Species of gastropod

Sigatica carolinensis is a species of predatory sea snail, a marine gastropod mollusc in the family Naticidae, the moon snails.

== Description ==
The maximum recorded shell length is 11 mm.

== Habitat ==
Minimum recorded depth is 11 m. Maximum recorded depth is 227 m.
