= Falsilunatia ambigua =

Scientific classification
- Kingdom: Animalia
- Phylum: Mollusca
- Class: Gastropoda
- Subclass: Caenogastropoda
- Order: Littorinimorpha
- Family: Naticidae
- Genus: Falsilunatia
- Species: F. ambigua

Binomial name
- Falsilunatia ambigua (Suter, 1913)

Synonyms
- Falsilunatia powelli Dell, 1956; † Polinices ambiguus Suter, 1913

Species of gastropod

Falsilunatia ambigua is a species of deepwater sea snail, a marine gastropod mollusc in the family Naticidae, the moon snails.
