= Falsilunatia carcellesi =

Scientific classification
- Kingdom: Animalia
- Phylum: Mollusca
- Class: Gastropoda
- Subclass: Caenogastropoda
- Order: Littorinimorpha
- Family: Naticidae
- Genus: Falsilunatia
- Species: F. carcellesi

Binomial name
- Falsilunatia carcellesi (Dell, 1990)

Synonyms
- Bulbus carcellesi Dell, 1990 (basionym)

Species of gastropod

Falsilunatia carcellesi is a species of predatory sea snail, a marine gastropod mollusc in the family Naticidae, the moon snails.

== Description ==
The maximum recorded shell length is 31.3 mm.

== Habitat ==
Minimum recorded depth is 18 m. Maximum recorded depth is 771 m.
