= Kerguelenatica delicatula =

Scientific classification
- Kingdom: Animalia
- Phylum: Mollusca
- Class: Gastropoda
- Subclass: Caenogastropoda
- Order: Littorinimorpha
- Family: Naticidae
- Genus: Kerguelenatica
- Species: K. delicatula

Binomial name
- Kerguelenatica delicatula (E. A. Smith, 1902)

Synonyms
- Amauropsis (Kerguelenatica) grisea (Martens, 1878); Falsilunatia delicatula (E. A. Smith, 1902); Kerguelenatica bioperculata Dell, 1990; Natica delicatula E. A. Smith, 1902 (original combination); Natica grisea Martens, 1878 (Invalid: junior homonym of Natica grisea Requien, 1848; Kerguelenatica bioperculata is a replacement name)

Species of sea snail

Kerguelenatica delicatula is a species of predatory sea snail, a marine gastropod mollusk in the family Naticidae, the moon snails.

== Description ==
The maximum recorded shell length is 17 mm.

== Habitat ==
Minimum recorded depth is 45 m. Maximum recorded depth is 548 m.
