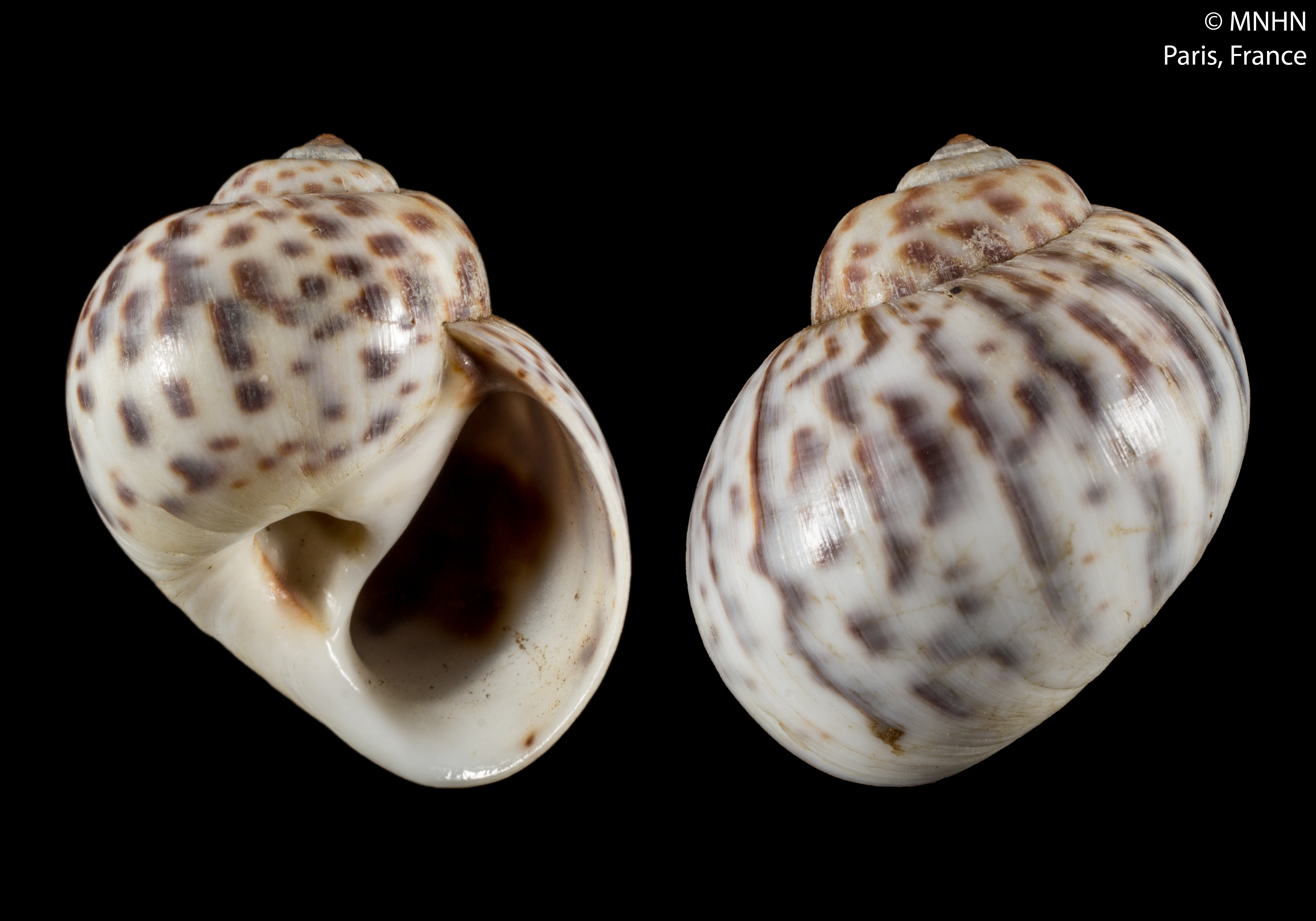
- Shell of Natica gruveli (holotype at MNHN, Paris)

Scientific classification
- Kingdom: Animalia
- Phylum: Mollusca
- Class: Gastropoda
- Subclass: Caenogastropoda
- Order: Littorinimorpha
- Family: Naticidae
- Genus: Natica
- Species: N. gruveli

Binomial name
- Natica gruveli Dautzenberg, 1910

Synonyms
- Natica gruveli var. paucipunctata Dautzenberg, 1910; Payraudeautia esterias P. Bernard, 1983; Payraudeautia gruveli (Dautzenberg, 1910)

= Natica gruveli =

Species of gastropod

Natica gruveli is a species of predatory sea snail, a marine gastropod mollusk in the family Naticidae, the moon snails.

== Description ==
The length of the shell attains 21 mm.

== Distribution ==
This marine species occurs off Gabon.
