= Falsilunatia amphiala =

Scientific classification
- Kingdom: Animalia
- Phylum: Mollusca
- Class: Gastropoda
- Subclass: Caenogastropoda
- Order: Littorinimorpha
- Family: Naticidae
- Genus: Falsilunatia
- Species: F. amphiala

Binomial name
- Falsilunatia amphiala (Watson, 1881)

Synonyms
- List: Friginatica amphiala (Watson, 1881); Natica amphiala Watson, 1881; Polinices amphialus Suter, 1913

Species of gastropod

Falsilunatia amphiala is a species of small deepwater sea snail, a marine gastropod mollusc in the family Naticidae.
