= Pseudopolinices =

Scientific classification
- Kingdom: Animalia
- Phylum: Mollusca
- Class: Gastropoda
- Subclass: Caenogastropoda
- Order: Littorinimorpha
- Family: Naticidae
- Genus: Pseudopolinices; Golikov & Sirenko, 1983

Genus of gastropods

Pseudopolinices is a genus of predatory sea snails, marine gastropod mollusks in the family Naticidae, the moon snails.

== Species ==
Species within the genus Pseudopolinices include:

- Pseudopolinices nanus (Møller, 1842)
