= Kerguelenatica =

Scientific classification
- Kingdom: Animalia
- Phylum: Mollusca
- Class: Gastropoda
- Subclass: Caenogastropoda
- Order: Littorinimorpha
- Family: Naticidae
- Genus: Kerguelenatica; Powell, 1951

Type species
- Natica grisea Martens, 1878

Synonyms
- Amauropsis (Kerguelenatica) Powell, 1951

Genus of gastropods

Kerguelenatica is a genus of predatory sea snails, marine gastropod mollusks in the family Naticidae, the moon snails.

== Species ==
Species within the genus Kerguelenatica include:

- Kerguelenatica delicatula (E. A. Smith, 1902)

Species brought into synonymy

- Kerguelenatica bioperculata (Martens, 1878): synonym of Kerguelenatica delicatula (E. A. Smith, 1902)
