= Sinuber =

Scientific classification
- Kingdom: Animalia
- Phylum: Mollusca
- Class: Gastropoda
- Subclass: Caenogastropoda
- Order: Littorinimorpha
- Family: Naticidae
- Subfamily: Polinicinae
- Genus: Sinuber; Powell, 1951

Genus of gastropods

Sinuber is a genus of predatory sea snails, marine gastropod molluscs in the family Naticidae, the moon snails.

== Species ==
Species within the genus Sinuber include:

- Sinuber microstriatum Dell, 1990
- Sinuber sculptum (Martens, 1878)
