= Globisinum =

Scientific classification
- Kingdom: Animalia
- Phylum: Mollusca
- Class: Gastropoda
- Subclass: Caenogastropoda
- Order: Littorinimorpha
- Family: Naticidae
- Genus: Globisinum; Marwick, 1924

Type species
- Sigaretus drewi Murdoch, 1899

Genus of gastropods

Globisinum is a genus of predatory sea snails, marine gastropod mollusks in the family Naticidae, the moon snails.

== Species ==
Species within the genus Globisinum include:

- † Globisinum crassiliratum Finlay, 1926
- Globisinum drewi (Murdoch, 1899)
- † Globisinum limatum (Tate, 1893)
- † Globisinum miocaenicum (Suter, 1917)
- † Globisinum perspectivum (Tate, 1893)
- † Globisinum pritchardi (Cossmann, 1907)
- † Globisinum spirale (P. Marshall, 1917)

Species brought into synonymy

- † Globisinum flemingi A. W. B. Powell, 1931; synonym of † Globisinum drewi (Murdoch, 1899) (junior subjective synonym)
- † Globisinum mucronatum Marwick, 1928: synonym of † Globisinum drewi (Murdoch, 1899) (junior subjective synonym)
- † Globisinum powelli Stilwell & Zinsmeister, 1992: synonym of † Sinuber powelli (Stilwell & Zinsmeister, 1992)
- Globisinum venustum (Suter, 1907): synonym of Globisinum drewi (Murdoch, 1899)
- Globisinum wollastoni Finlay, 1927: synonym of Globisinum drewi (Murdoch, 1899)
