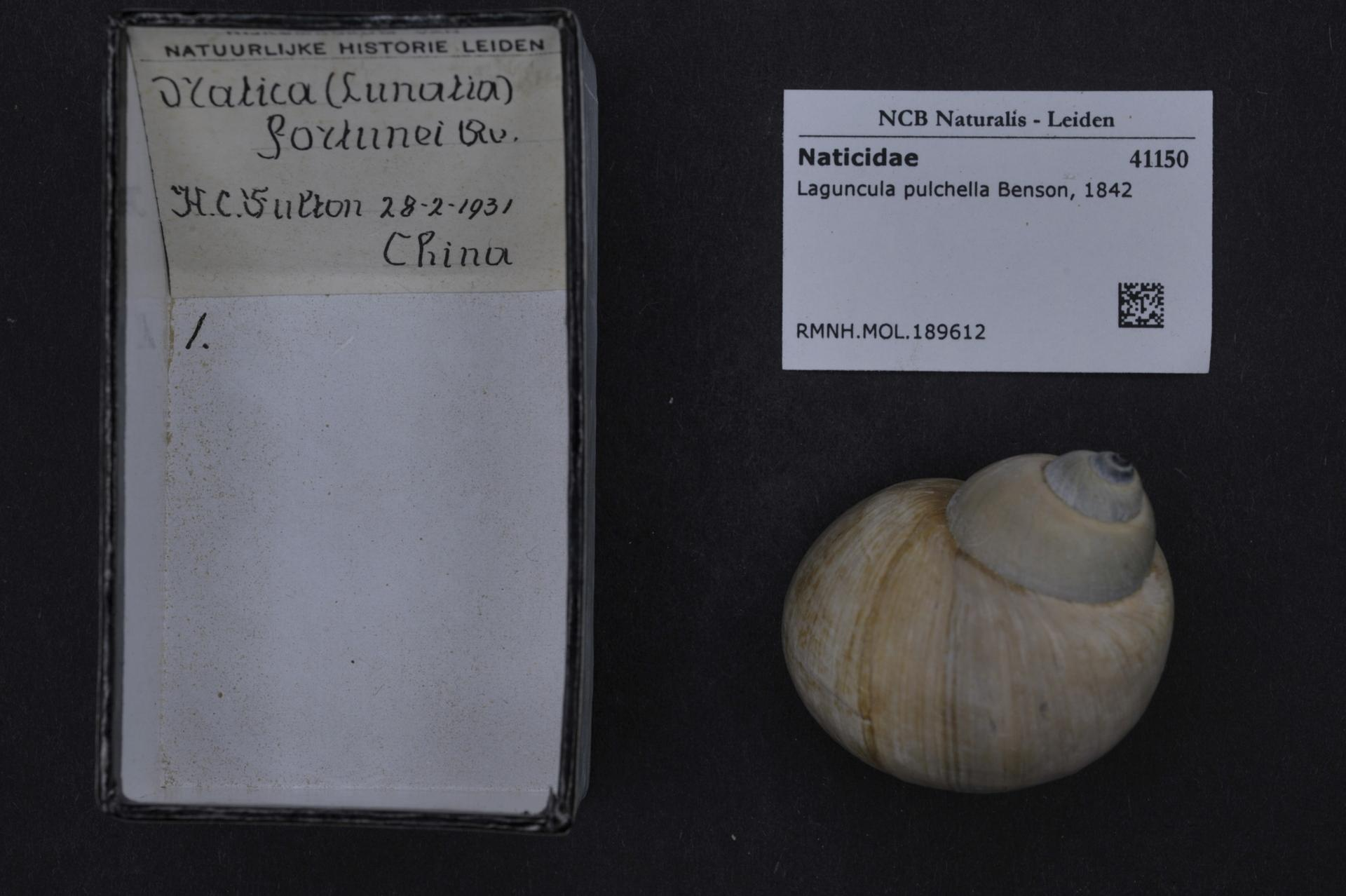
- Laguncula pulchella shell

Scientific classification
- Kingdom: Animalia
- Phylum: Mollusca
- Class: Gastropoda
- Subclass: Caenogastropoda
- Order: Littorinimorpha
- Family: Naticidae
- Genus: Laguncula; Benson, 1842

Type species
- Laguncula pulchella Benson, 1842

Synonyms
- Bensonia Gray, 1847; Scarlatia Schileyko, 1977

= Laguncula =

Genus of gastropods

Laguncula is a genus of sea snails, marine gastropod molluscs in the family Naticidae.

== General characteristics ==
(Original description in Latin) The shell is turbinate (top-shaped) and subglobose (somewhat spherical). It has a large, entire, oblong aperture. The peristome (aperture margin) is interrupted. The lip is somewhat reflected (turned back). The umbilicus is deep and tortuous.

== Species ==
Species within the genus Laguncula include:

- Laguncula pulchella Benson, 1842

== Bibliography ==
- Torigoe K. & Inaba A. (2011) Revision on the classification of Recent Naticidae. Bulletin of the Nishinomiya Shell Museum 7: 133 + 15 pp., 4 pls.
