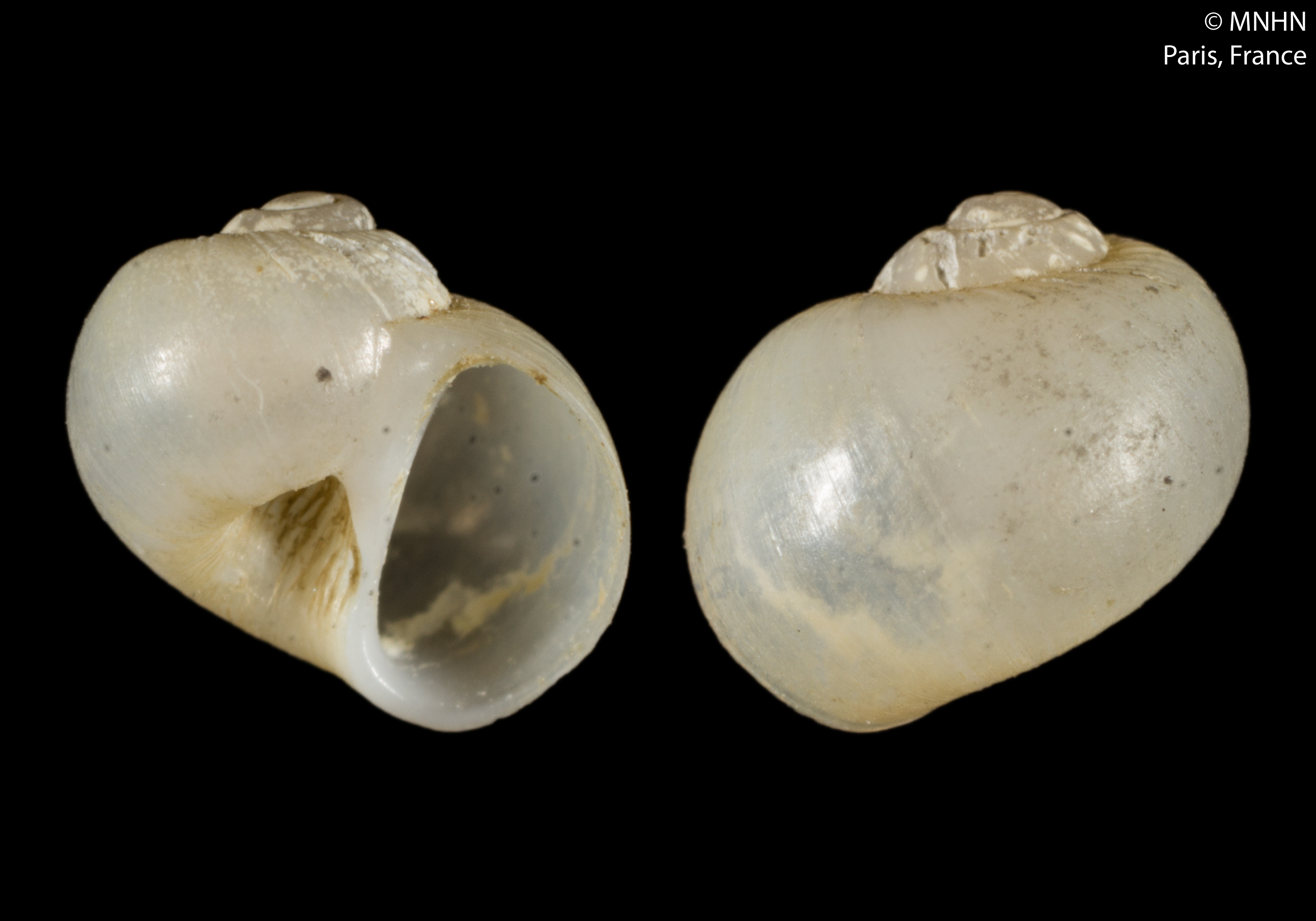
- Shell of Microlinices latiusculus (holotype at MNHN, Paris)

Scientific classification
- Kingdom: Animalia
- Phylum: Mollusca
- Class: Gastropoda
- Subclass: Caenogastropoda
- Order: Littorinimorpha
- Superfamily: Naticoidea
- Family: Naticidae
- Genus: Microlinices; Simone, 2014

Type species
- Microlinices latiusculusSimone, 2014

= Microlinices =

Genus of gastropods

Microlinices is a genus of predatory sea snails, marine gastropod mollusks in the subfamily [unassigned] Naticidae of the family Naticidae, the moon snails.

== Species ==
Species within the genus Microlinices include:

- Microlinices apiculus Simone, 2014
- Microlinices benthovus Simone, 2014
- Microlinices gaiophanis Simone, 2014
- Microlinices ibitingus Simone, 2014
- Microlinices latiusculus Simone, 2014
- Microlinices ombratus Simone, 2014
