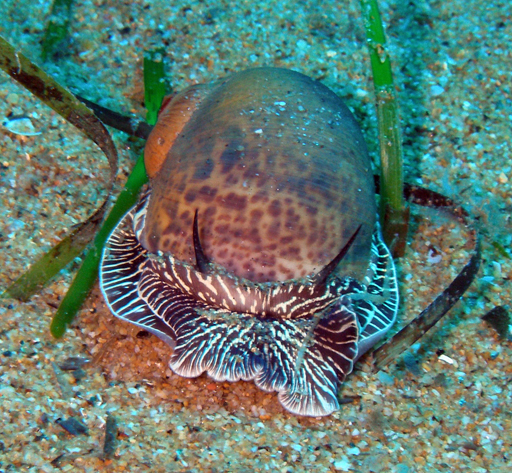
- Live individual in situ

Scientific classification
- Domain: Eukaryota
- Kingdom: Animalia
- Phylum: Mollusca
- Class: Gastropoda
- Subclass: Caenogastropoda
- Order: Littorinimorpha
- Family: Naticidae
- Genus: Naticarius
- Species: N. hebraeus

Binomial name
- Naticarius hebraeus Martyn, 1784

Synonyms
- Cochlis fanel Röding, 1798; Nacca maxima Risso, 1826; Natica adspersa Menke, 1830; Natica fanel (Röding, 1798); Natica hebraea (Martyn, 1786); Natica hebraea var. rarimaculata Bucquoy, Dautzenberg & Dollfus, 1883; Natica maculata von Salis, 1793; Natica maculata Deshayes, 1838; Naticarius cruentatus (Gmelin, 1791) sensu Poppe & Goto, 1991 (misidentification); Naticarius fanel (Röding, 1798); Nerita hebraea Martyn, 1786 (original combination); Nerita maculata Salis Marschlins, 1793

= Naticarius hebraeus =

Species of gastropod

Naticarius hebraeus is a species of predatory sea snail, a marine gastropod mollusk in the family Naticidae, the moon snails.

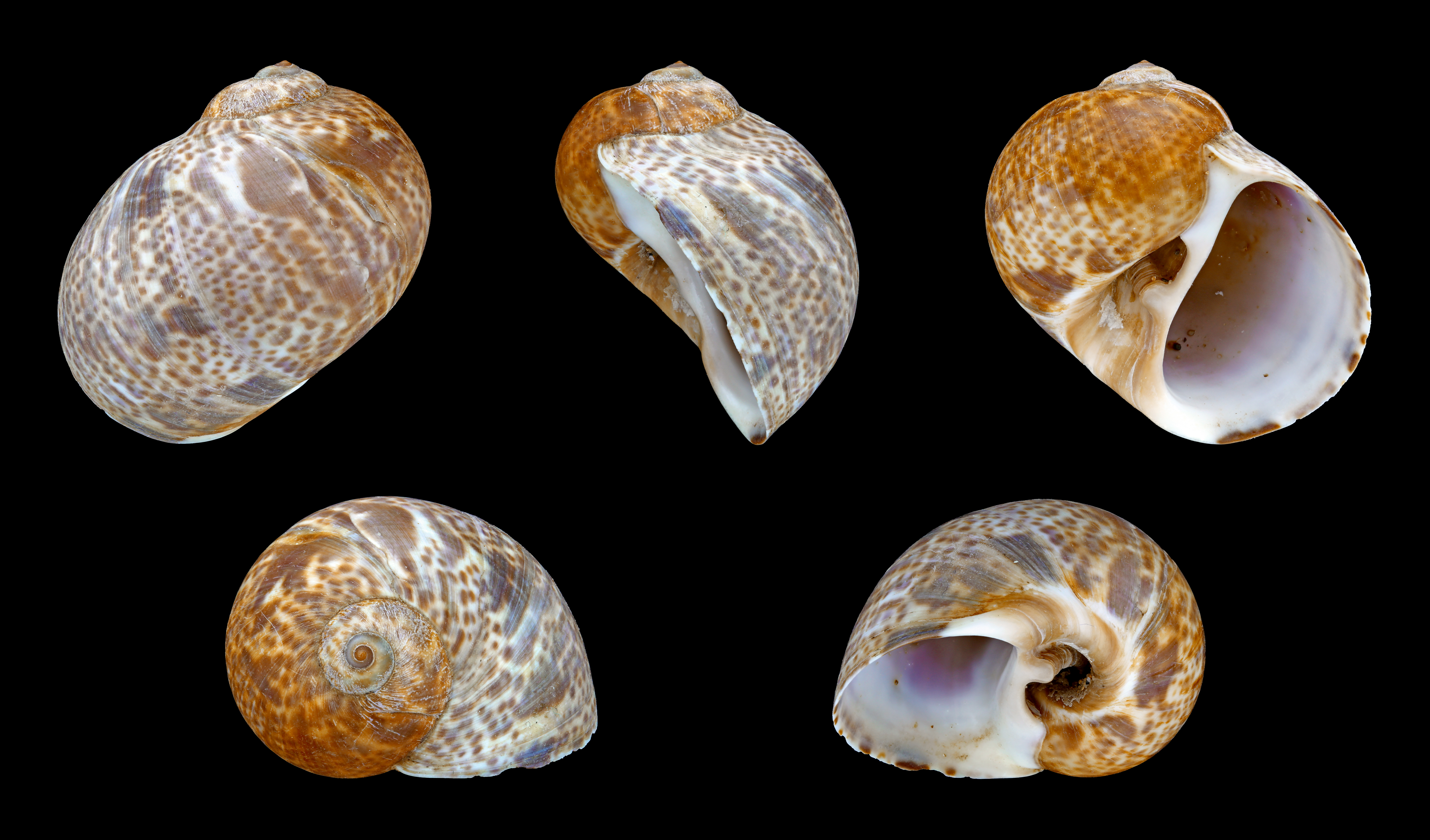
Five views of a shell of Naticarius hebraeus

== Distribution ==
This species occurs in European waters and in the Mediterranean Sea.
