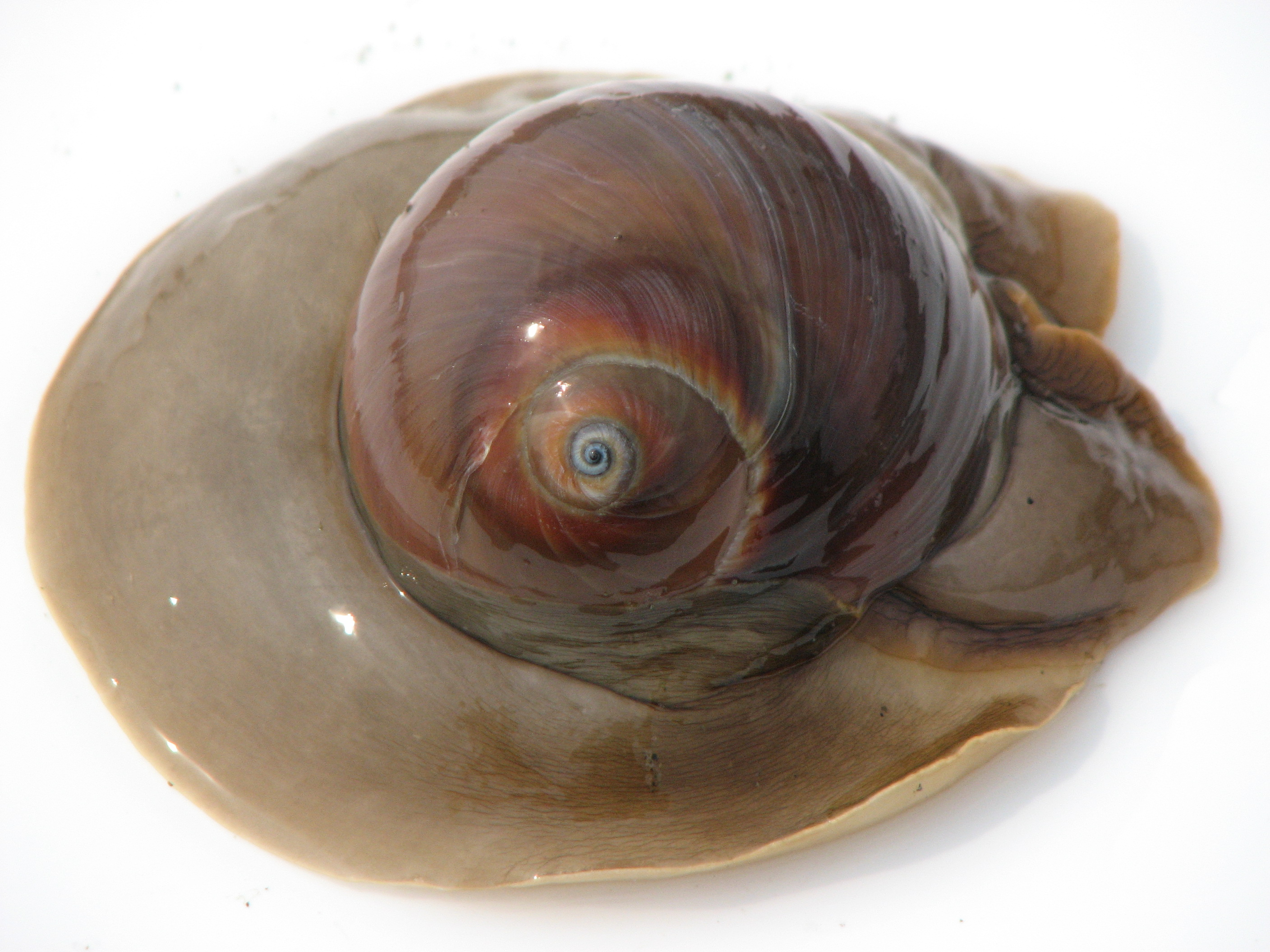
- A live and active individual of Neverita didyma, viewed from above
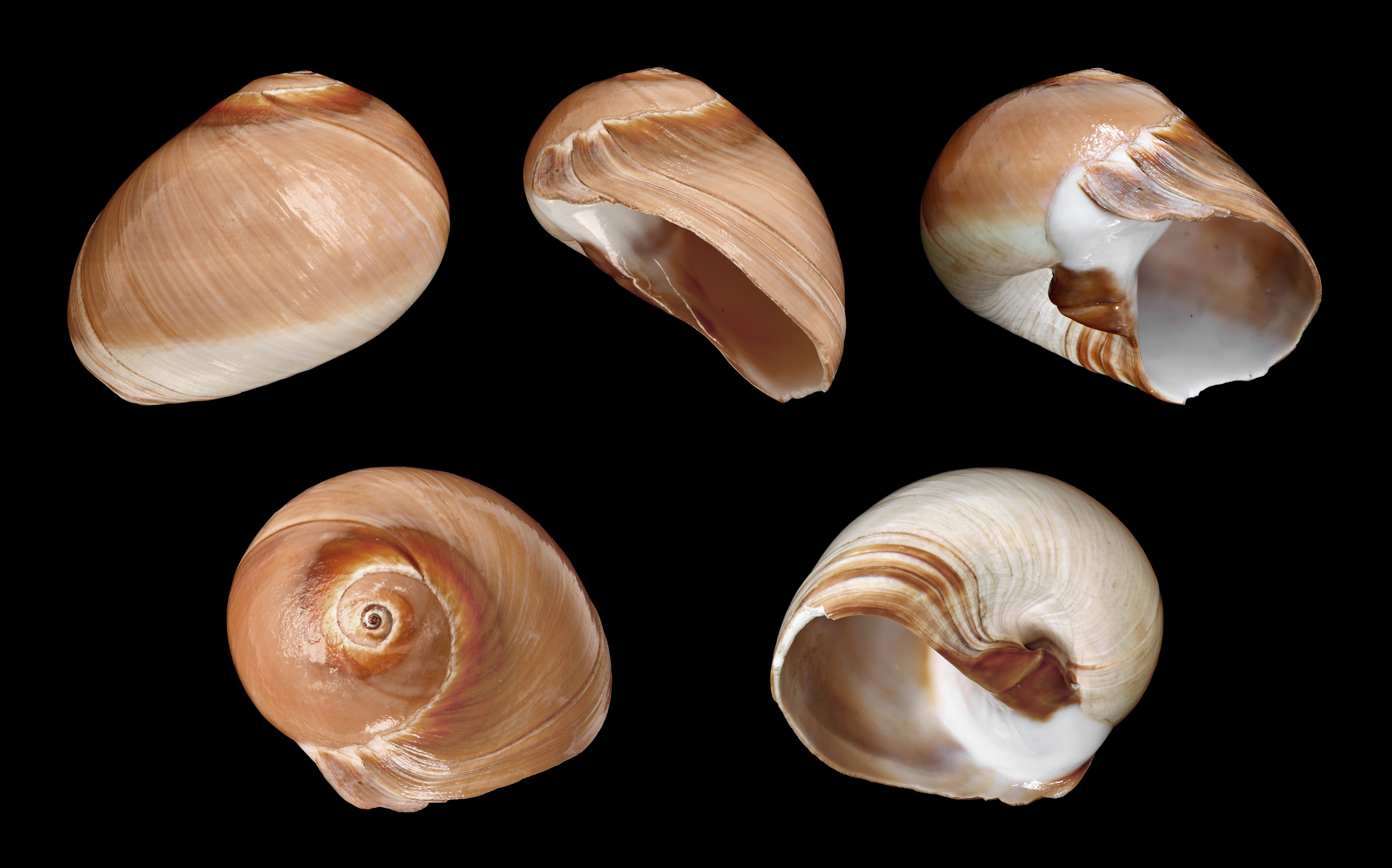
- Five views of a shell of Neverita didyma

Scientific classification
- Kingdom: Animalia
- Phylum: Mollusca
- Class: Gastropoda
- Subclass: Caenogastropoda
- Order: Littorinimorpha
- Family: Naticidae
- Genus: Neverita
- Species: N. didyma

Binomial name
- Neverita didyma (Röding, 1798)

Synonyms
- Albula didyma Röding, 1798; Glossaulax didyma (Röding, 1798); Natica ampla Iwakawa, 1900; Natica chemnitzii Récluz in Chenu, 1843 (doubtful synonym); Natica didyma (Röding, 1798); Natica glaucina Lamarck, J.B.P.A. de, 1822; Natica lamarckiana Reeve, L.A., 1855; Natica petiveriana Récluz, C. in Chenu, J.C., 1843; Natica problematica Reeve, L.A., 1855; Natica robusta Dunker, R.W., 1860; Neverita bicolor Philippi, 1849; Neverita didyma (Röding, 1798); Polinices didyma (Röding, 1798); Polinices ephebus Hedley, 1915; Polinices papyracea Busch, von dem in Philippi, R.A., 1845; Polinices (Glossaulax) aulacoglossa Pilsbry, H.A. & E.G. Vanatta, 1908, "1909"; Polinices (Glossaulax) ephebus Hedley, C., 1915

= Neverita didyma =

Species of mollusc

Neverita didyma, common name the bladder moon snail or moon shell, is a species of predatory sea snail, a marine gastropod mollusc in the family Naticidae, the moon snails. Like all naticids, this species is a carnivore and a predator.

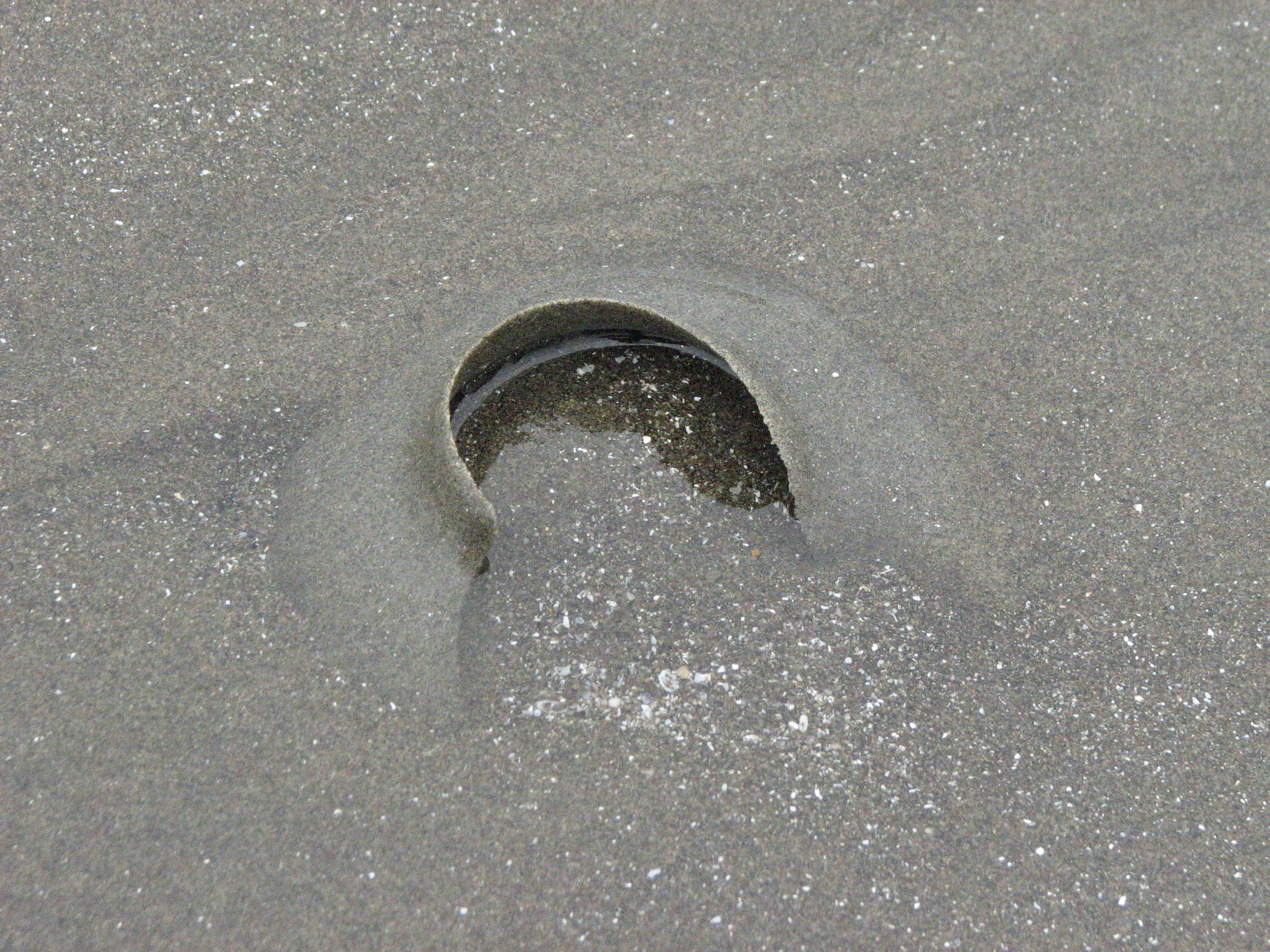
Egg mass

== Subspecies ==
- Neverita didyma ampla (Philippi, 1849)
- Neverita didyma hayashii (Azuma, 1961)
- Neverita didyma hosoyai (Kira, 1959)

== Description ==
The size of an adult shell of this species is discoid and varies between 20 mm and 90 mm, and is noticeably smooth, glossy and thick. The spiral tip does not stick out, causing a spherical shape. The shell appears plain white, sometimes with pearly pastel shades with a narrow white spiral at the spire sometimes with irregular blotches of colors. The underside of the shell includes a brown blotch with a small depression. The operculum is smooth and made out of a thin, yellow, horn-like material. The snail's tentacles have opaque white bands around them.

=== Common misidentifications ===
The snail is often mistaken for Polinices mammatus, the bosom moon snail, that has a teardrop shaped shell and has an underside which is completely white with a bump instead of a depression. The Ball moon snail is less shy and doesn't retract immediately into its shell like the Bosom moon snail.

== Etymology ==
The snail gets its "moon" part of the name because its aperture is shaped like a crescent moon. The "didyma" part of the name could refer to either "testicles" or "twins". The "ball" part of the name is because the overall shape of the shell is almost shaped like a ball.

== Distribution ==
This marine species is found in the Yellow Sea or off the coast of the Madagascar, Mozambique, South Africa of the Indian Ocean and Australia.

=== Habitat ===
The snail is commonly seen in sandy and muddy shores usually at night or a cool day. The snail is usually ploughing through sand for hunting near beaches with seagrass. It is often found hunting for button snails. Its predator is Argyrops spinifer.

== Culinary use ==
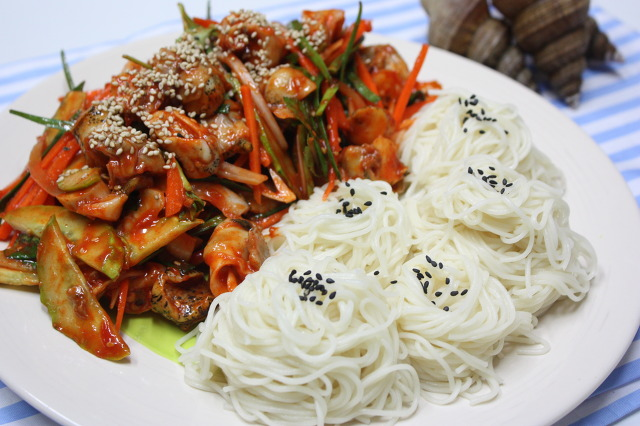
Golbaengi-muchim (moon snail salad)

In Korean cuisine the snails are used in a dish called golbaengi-muchim (moon snail salad). It is usually collected using fishing nets at depths of 2-10 m.

== Online fake news ==
In late 2018, a website in Thailand reported that on December 22, the body of a young woman was found lying dead on a beach in Phuket, in southern Thailand. The body was lying on top of horned turbans (Turbo cornutus), and there were greenish bruises on her back, resembling snake bites.

The report cited officials from the Department of Fisheries, claiming that turbans are venomous. However, the Department of Fisheries later investigated and confirmed that the story was fake news. The snail shown in the accompanying image was actually identified as Neverita didyma, a species commonly found in Lamae District, Chumphon Province. This species is edible and non-venomous. The Department of Fisheries also stated that it would take legal action against the website.
