= Spironema (gastropod) =

Spironema Temporal range: Cretaceous

Scientific classification
- Kingdom: Animalia
- Phylum: Mollusca
- Class: Gastropoda
- (unranked): clade Caenogastropoda clade Hypsogastropoda clade Littorinimorpha
- Superfamily: Naticoidea
- Family: Naticidae
- Genus: †Spironema Meek, 1864

Genus of gastropods

Spironema is a genus of extinct (Cretaceous) sea snails, marine gastropod mollusks in the family Naticidae, the moon snails.

== Description ==
The American paleontologist Fielding Bradford Meek firstly defined this genus in 1864. He classified the genus in the family Littorinidae. He recognized two species Spironema bella and Spironema tenuilineata in 1864. These species were previously classified within the family Trochidae. Meek's diagnosis reads as follows:

Shell ovate; whorls rounded, and separated by a rather deep suture; aperture ovate, lip thin, continuous; columella not thickened, perforated by a very small umbilicus; surface with revolving lines and furrows. The non-perlaceous texture of the interior layer, as well as the other characters of such Cretaceous shells, remove them from the Trochidae.

== Species ==
Species within the genus Spironema include:

- Spironema bella (Conrad) - synonym: Tuba (?) bella Conrad, from Cretaceous of Alabama
- Spironema tenuilineata (Meek & Hayden, 1856) - from Cretaceous of Dakota Territory, type species: Turbo tenuilineatus Meek & Hayden, 1856 - synonym: Turbo tenuilineata
- Spironema perryi Stephenson - from Maastrichtian, Texas. Spironema cf. perryi is also known from the Upper Cretaceous, Cliff House Sandstone, Chaco Canyon, northwestern New Mexico.
