= Sigatica =

Scientific classification
- Kingdom: Animalia
- Phylum: Mollusca
- Class: Gastropoda
- Subclass: Caenogastropoda
- Order: Littorinimorpha
- Family: Naticidae
- Subfamily: Sininae
- Genus: Sigatica; Meyer & Aldrich, 1886

Synonyms
- Gennaeosinum Iredale, 1929

Genus of gastropods

Sigatica is a genus of predatory sea snails, marine gastropod mollusks in the family Naticidae, the moon snails.

== Species ==
Species within the genus Sigatica include:

- Sigatica carolinensis (Dall, 1889)
- Sigatica cubana Espinosa, Ortea & Fernadez-Garcés, 2007
- Sigatica peleum (Iredale, 1929)
- Sigatica pomatiella (Melvill, 1893)
- Sigatica semisulcata (Gray, 1839)
