= Golbaengi-muchim =

Korean spicy snail and vegetable dish

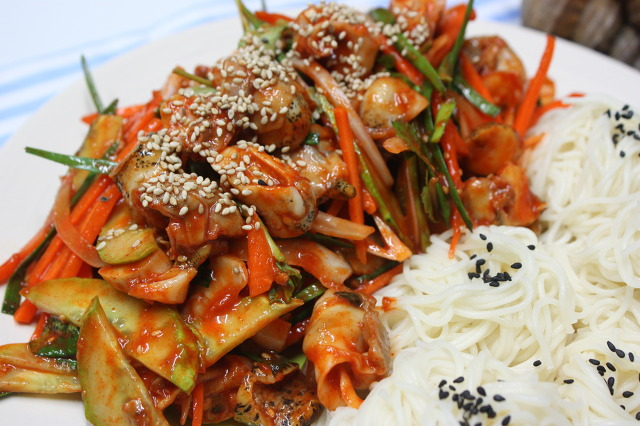
- South Korean-style golbaengi-muchim
- Alternative names: Moon snail salad
- Type: Muchim
- Course: Anju
- Place of origin: Korea
- Associated cuisine: Korean cuisine
- Main ingredients: Moon snails

Korean name
- Hangul: 골뱅이무침
- RR: golbaengimuchim
- MR: kolbaengimuch'im
- IPA: [kol.bɛŋ.i.mu.tɕʰim]

Golbaengi-muchim (골뱅이무침) or moon snail salad is a type of muchim (salad) made by mixing moon snails with vegetables. In South Korea, it is a typical snack eaten with alcoholic drinks (anju), typically made with red, spicy sauce and served with boiled somyeon (wheat noodles). Like other anju, it is sold in pojangmacha (street stalls).

== Preparation ==
Whelks are washed, boiled, and shelled. (Or precooked canned whelk may be used). Bigger ones are halved, and the snail meat is mixed with vegetables (most commonly julienned scallions, carrots, onions, and sliced cucumber), and seasonings (most commonly chili paste, chili powder, soy sauce, minced garlic, vinegar, and sesame oil). It is served with toasted sesame seeds sprinkled on top. As an additional ingredient, shredded dried pollock (hwangtae-po, 황태; 黄太 (Note: lit. 'yellow pollock',)) that has been reconstituted and soften by soaking may be tossed in the salad as well. (Note: Addition of this softened dried pollack slivers turns the dish into a hoemuchim according to a source, although hoe typically refers to use of raw fish.)

Adding boiled somyeon (wheat noodles) in the mix the spicy salad is typical, (Note: Substitutable by Japanese sōmen which is similar.) though one might call the dish golbaengi-muchim-guksu (골뱅이무침국수, lit. 'moon snail seasoned, with noodles') to be specific.

== Gallery ==
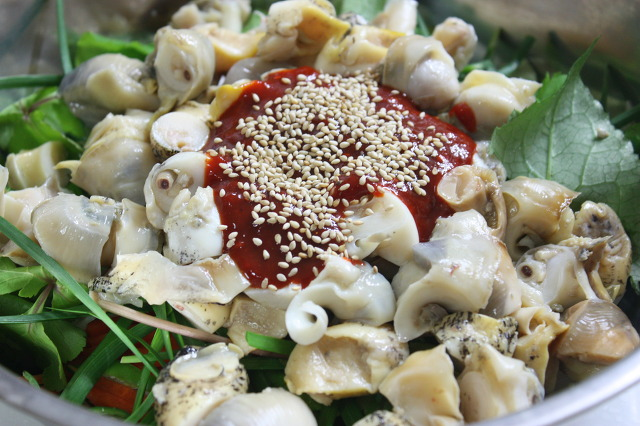
Preparing golbaengi-muchim

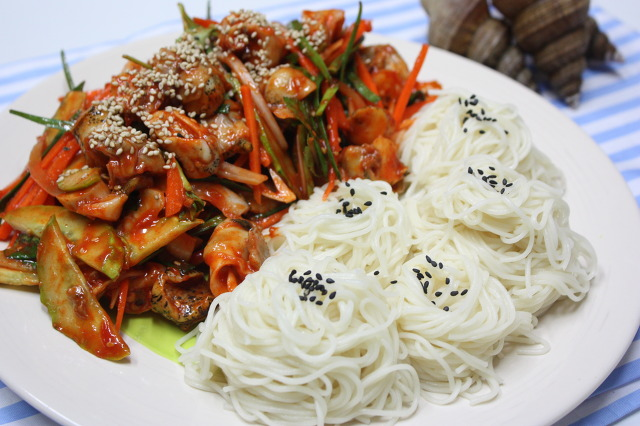
Golbaengi-muchim served with somyeon

== See also ==
- Bún ốc
- Escargot
- List of salads
- Luósīfěn
- scungilli
