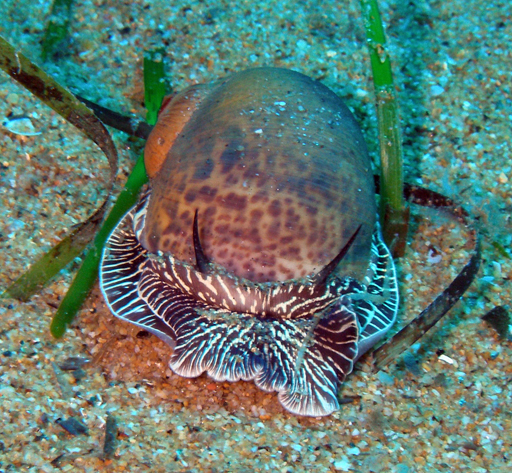
- A live individual of Naticarius hebraeus (Martyn, 1786), viewed from the front

Scientific classification
- Kingdom: Animalia
- Phylum: Mollusca
- Class: Gastropoda
- Subclass: Caenogastropoda
- Order: Littorinimorpha
- Superfamily: Naticoidea
- Family: Naticidae; Guilding, 1834

Type genus
- Pseudomelatoma Dall, 1918

Genera
- See text

Diversity
- 260–270 Recent species

= Naticidae =

Naticidae Temporal range: late Triassic or early Jurassic – Recent

Family of gastropods

Naticidae, common name moon snails or necklace shells, is a family of medium to large-sized predatory sea snails, marine gastropod molluscs in the clade Littorinimorpha. The shells of the species in this family are mostly globular in shape.

Naticidae is the only family in the superfamily Naticoidea.

It has been estimated that worldwide there are about 260–270 recent species of naticid snails. This group is assumed to have originated in the late Triassic or in the early Jurassic. Members of this family can be recognized by the shape of their shells, distinct appearance, or by their predatory behaviour.

== Distribution ==
Naticids are widely distributed and occur worldwide and are considered to be a delicate part of the web of nature amongst many others. The greatest diversity of both species and genera is found in tropical regions. Even so, naticid snails are also plentiful in temperate, Arctic and Antarctic waters.

== Habitat ==
Moon snails live on sandy substrates, at a great variety of depths depending on the species (from the intertidal zone to thousands of meters in depth). They are often seen ploughing along in the sand, searching for bivalves and other prey, resulting in countersunk bore-holes.

== Life habits ==
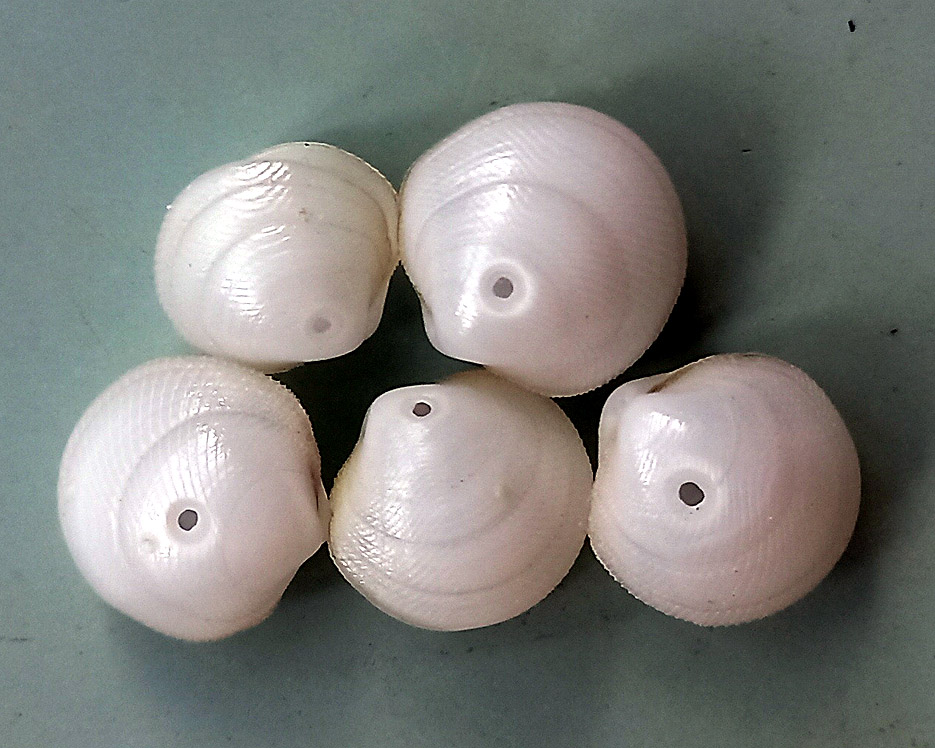
Divaricella quadrisulcata showing Naticid predation holes

Naticids are predatory, feeding mostly on bivalves. They will also attack almost any other shelled mollusk they encounter in the sand, such as scaphopods and other gastropods, including other moon snails. Additionally, Conuber sordidum was shown to prey on the soldier crab Mictyris longicarpus (Crustacea) by drilling predation. To catch soldier crabs, C. sordidum uses the same behaviour as when hunting shelled molluscan prey.

The moon snail envelops the prey and then bores a perfect hole through the shell using its radula and an acid secretion. Once the shell is bored open, the proboscis is used to consume the soft body tissues of the prey as a liquid mass.

The hole in the shell, which has a "countersunk" appearance with chamfered edges, and which varies in size according to the species, is a characteristic sign of moon snail predation.

=== Sand collars ===
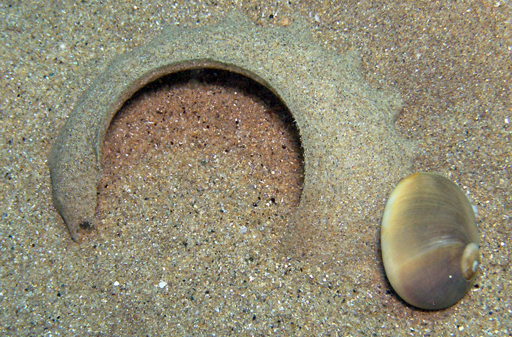
Sand collar and shell of Neverita josephinia; Mediterranean Sea

In the breeding season, the female moon snail lays a rather stiff egg mass which includes sand and mucus. These objects wash up on sandy beaches fairly often, and are known by the common name "sand collars" because of their resemblance to an old-fashioned removable shirt collar or false-collar, especially when intact. These egg masses are characteristic of the moon snails, being unique to this family. The sand collar consists of sand grains cemented together by a gelatinous matrix, with the embedded eggs contained within the matrix. The collar is laid by the female moon snail, and the size of the sand collar gives an indication of the size of the adult female moon snail that laid it; larger species of moon snail lay larger sand collars.

A fresh sand collar feels stiff and yet flexible, as if it were made out of plastic. Each sand collar contains thousands of capsules, each one housing one or several live embryos. In species with planktonic development, these embryos hatch out as bilobed veligers. After the eggs hatch, the sand collar disintegrates. Sand collars are often found washed up either whole or fragmented on sandy beaches where moon snails inhabit, either intertidally or subtidally.

== Human interactions ==
In Korean cuisine, moon snails are called golbaengi (골뱅이) and eaten as golbaengi-muchim (moon snail salad).

Moon snail shells are attractive and relatively large, and often popular in jewellery and ornamentation.

== Taxonomy ==
=== Traditional classification ===
Some authors have suggested a distinct separation of the Naticidae into four subfamilies: Ampullospirinae, Naticinae, Polinicinae and Sininae. This arrangement is mainly based on morphological data, such as details of the operculum including the material (calcareous in the Naticinae, corneous in the Polinicinae and Sininae) and size, and also the morphology of the shell.

=== 2005 taxonomy ===
The following four subfamilies were recognized in the taxonomy of Bouchet & Rocroi (2005):

- Naticinae Guilding, 1834 - synonyms: Neveritinae Gray, 1857; Choristidae Verrill, 1882; Euspiridae Cossmann, 1907; Mammillinae Iredale & McMichael, 1962; Eunaticinini Oyama, 1469
- Sininae Woodring, 1928 - synonyms: Sigaretidae Gary, 1827; Cryptostomidae Gray, 1827
- Globisininae Powell, 1933
- Polinicinae Gray, 1847

== Genera ==
Genera in the family Naticidae include:

Unassigned to a subfamily

- † Amauropsina Chelot, 1885
- † Amauropsona H. J. Finlay & Marwick, 1937
- † Austrocochlis H. J. Finlay & Marwick, 1937
- Benthobulbus J. H. McLean, 1995
- † Carinacca Marwick, 1924
- † Cepatia J. E. Gray, 1842
- † Darwinices Griffin & Pastorino, 2013
- Laguncula W. H. Benson, 1842
- † Magnatica Marwick, 1924
- † Maxwellinatica Beu & B. A. Marshall, 2011
- † Nanggulania K. Martin, 1914
- † Pliconacca K. Martin, 1914
- † Polinella Marwick, 1931

Subfamily Naticidae incertae sedis (temporary name)

- Haliotinella Souverbie, 1875
- Microlinices Simone, 2014

Subfamily Naticinae

- Cochlis Röding, 1798
- Cryptonatica Dall, 1892
- Glyphepithema Rehder, 1943
- Lunaia Berry, 1964: synonym of Natica Scopoli, 1777
- Natica Scopoli, 1777
- Naticarius Duméril, 1806
- Notocochlis Powell, 1933
- Paratectonatica Azuma, 1961
- Proxiuber Powell, 1933
- Stigmaulax Mörch, 1852
- Tanea Marwick, 1931
- † Taniella Finlay & Marwick, 1937
- Tasmatica Finlay & Marwick, 1937
- Tectonatica Sacco, 1890

subfamily Globisininae

- Falsilunatia Powell, 1951
- Globisinum Marwick, 1924

subfamily Polinicinae Gray, 1847

- Amauropsis Mörch, 1857
- Bulbus Brown, 1839
- Conuber Finlay & Marwick, 1937
- Euspira Agassiz in Sowerby, 1838
- Friginatica Hedley, 1916
- Glossaulax Pilsbry, 1929
- Hypterita Woodring, 1957
- Kerguelenatica Powell, 1951
- Mammilla Schumacher, 1817
- Neverita Risso, 1826: its subgenus or synonym includes Glossaulax Pilsbry, 1929
- Polinices Montfort, 1810
- Pseudopolinices Golikov & Sirenko, 1983
- Sinuber Powell, 1951
- † Tahunacca P. A. Maxwell, 1992
- Uberella Finlay, 1928

Subfamily Sininae Woodring, 1928

- Calinaticina J. Q. Burch & Campbell, 1963
- Eunaticina Fischer, 1885
- Gennaeosinum Iredale, 1929
- Payraudeautia Bucquoy, Dautzenberg & Dollfus, 1883: (uncertain > taxon inquirendum, treated by some as synonym of Euspira)
- † Sigaretotrema Sacco, 1890
- Sigatica O. Meyer & Aldrich, 1886
- Sinum Röding, 1798

subfamily ?

- † Gyrodes Conrad, 1860: belongs to the family †Gyrodidae Conrad, 1860
- Spironema Meek, 1864 - notin WoRMS.

== Synonyms ==
- Acrybia Adams, 1853: synonym of Bulbus T. Brown, 1839
- Albula Röding, 1798: synonym of Polinices Montfort, 1810 (Invalid: junior homonym of Albula Osbeck, 1762 [Pisces])
- Aloconatica Shikama, 1971: synonym of Stigmaulax Mörch, 1852
- Boreonatica A. N. Golikov & Kussakin, 1974: synonym of Cryptonatica Dall, 1892 (junior objective synonym of Cryptonatica)
- Catinus Oken, 1835: synonym of Sinum Röding, 1798
- Cryptostoma: synonym of Cryptostomus Blainville, 1818: synonym of Sinum Röding, 1798 (incorrect subsequent spelling of Cryptostomus)* Choristes P. P. Carpenter, 1872: synonym of Amauropsis Mörch, 1857
- Cryptostomus Blainville, 1818: synonym of Sinum Röding, 1798
- Ectosinum Iredale, 1931: synonym of Sinum Röding, 1798
- Eucaryum Ehrenberg, 1831: synonym of Polinices Montfort, 1810
- Eunatica Melvill, 1899: synonym of Natica (Eunatica) Melvill, 1899: synonym of Natica Scopoli, 1777 (unaccepted rank)
- † Labellinacca Cossmann, 1919: synonym of Euspira Agassiz, 1837
- Lunaia S. S. Berry, 1964: synonym of Natica Scopoli, 1777
- Lunatia Gray, 1847: synonym of Euspira Agassiz, 1837 (junior subjective synonym)
- Heliconatica Dall, 1924: synonym of Eunaticina P. Fischer, 1885
- Mamilla: synonym of Mammilla Schumacher, 1817 (incorrect spelling of generic name)
- Mamillaria Swainson, 1840: synonym of Polinices Montfort, 1810
- Mamma H. Adams & A. Adams, 1853: synonym of Polinices Montfort, 1810 (junior synonym)
- Mammillaria Herrmannsen, 1847: synonym of Mamillaria Swainson, 1840: synonym of Polinices Montfort, 1810 (Unjustified emendation)
- Nacca Risso, 1826: synonym of Natica Scopoli, 1777
- Naticarinus [sic]: synonym of Naticarius Duméril, 1805 (misspelling - incorrect subsequent spelling)
- Naticella Swainson, 1840: synonym of Polinices Montfort, 1810
- Naticina Guilding, 1834: synonym of Polinices Montfort, 1810 (junior subjective synonym)
- Naticina J. E. Gray, 1847: synonym of Eunaticina P. Fischer, 1885 (junior homonym, Invalid: junior homonym of Naticina Guilding, 1834; Eunaticina P. Fischer, 1885 is a replacement name)
- Naticus Montfort, 1810: synonym of Naticarius Duméril, 1805
- Pervisinum Iredale, 1931: synonym of Eunaticina P. Fischer, 1885
- Polynices Herrmannsen, 1847: synonym of Polinices Montfort, 1810 (Invalid: unjustified emendation of Polinices)
- Pristinacca H. J. Finlay & Marwick, 1937: synonym of † Taniella H. J. Finlay & Marwick, 1937 (junior subjective synonym)
- Propesinum Iredale, 1924: synonym of Eunaticina P. Fischer, 1885
- Quantonatica Iredale, 1936: synonym of Naticarius Duméril, 1805
- Ruma Gray, 1847: synonym of Mammilla Schumacher, 1817
- Sigaretus Lamarck, 1799: synonym of Sinum Röding, 1798 (unaccepted > junior subjective synonym)
- † Sulconacca Marwick, 1924: synonym of Friginatica Hedley, 1916 (junior subjective synonym)
- Uber R. A. Philippi, 1853: synonym of Polinices Montfort, 1810

== Gallery ==
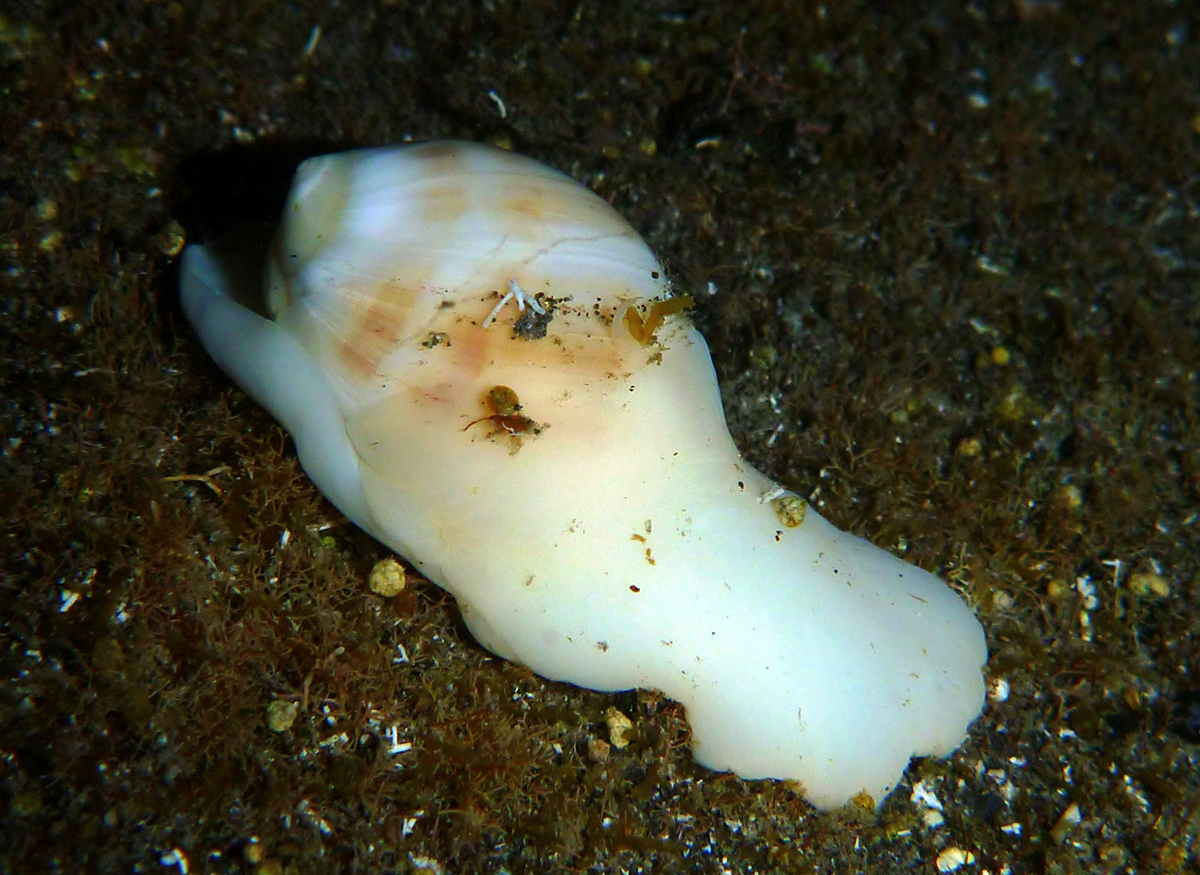
Mammilla melanostoma

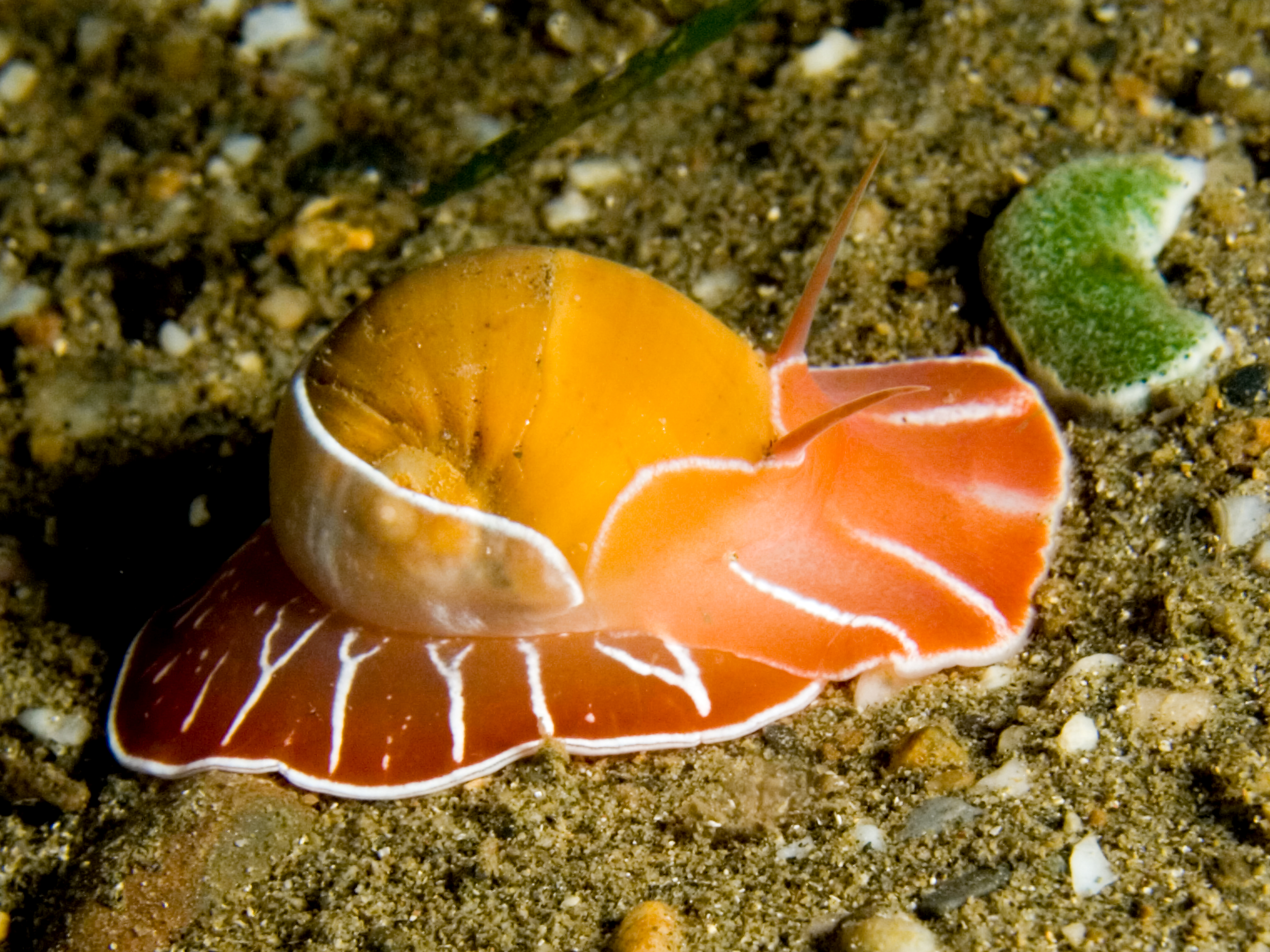
Naticarius orientalis; north coast of East Timor

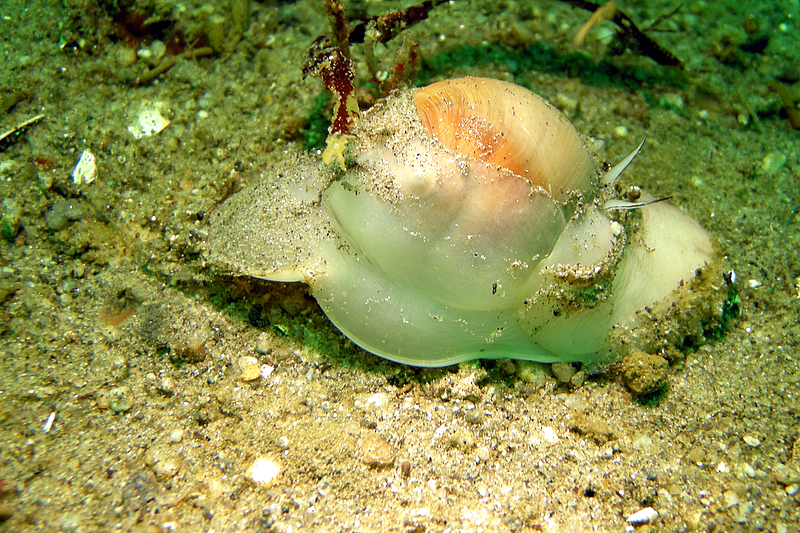
Neverita lewisii

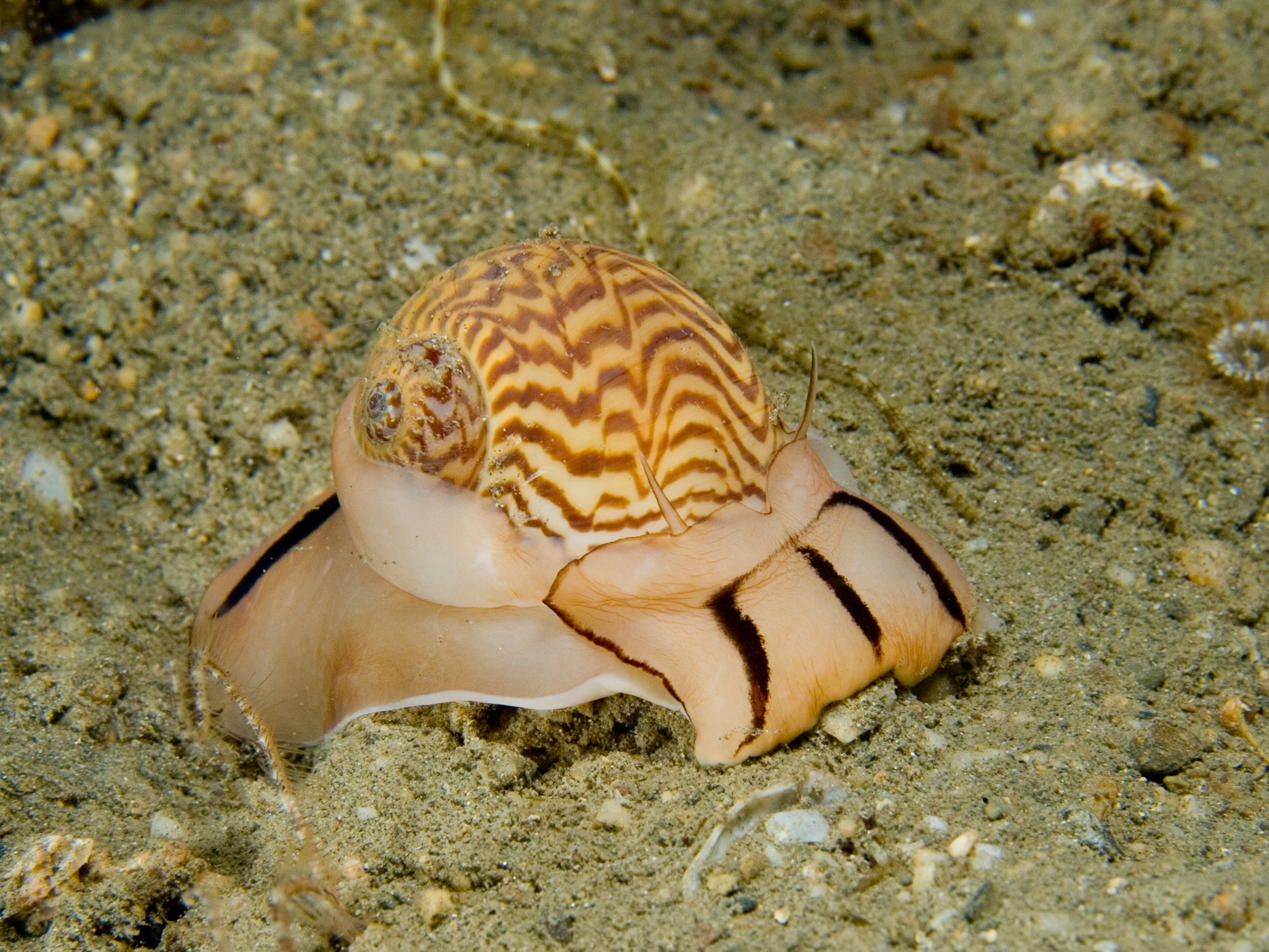
Tanea undulata

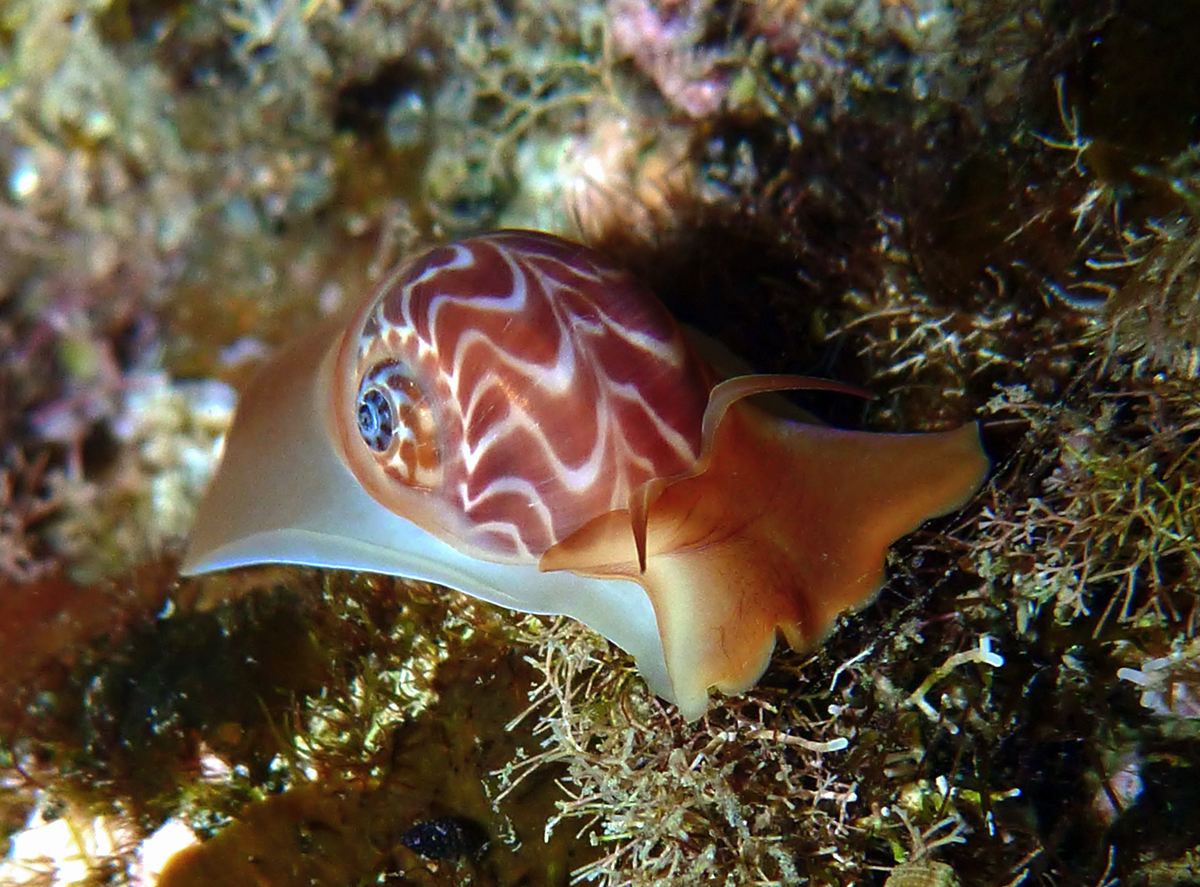
Tectonatica violacea

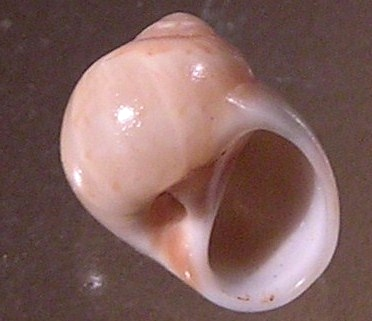
Eunaticina nitida

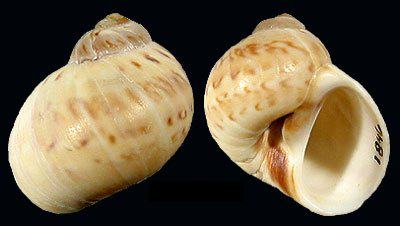
Euspira nitida

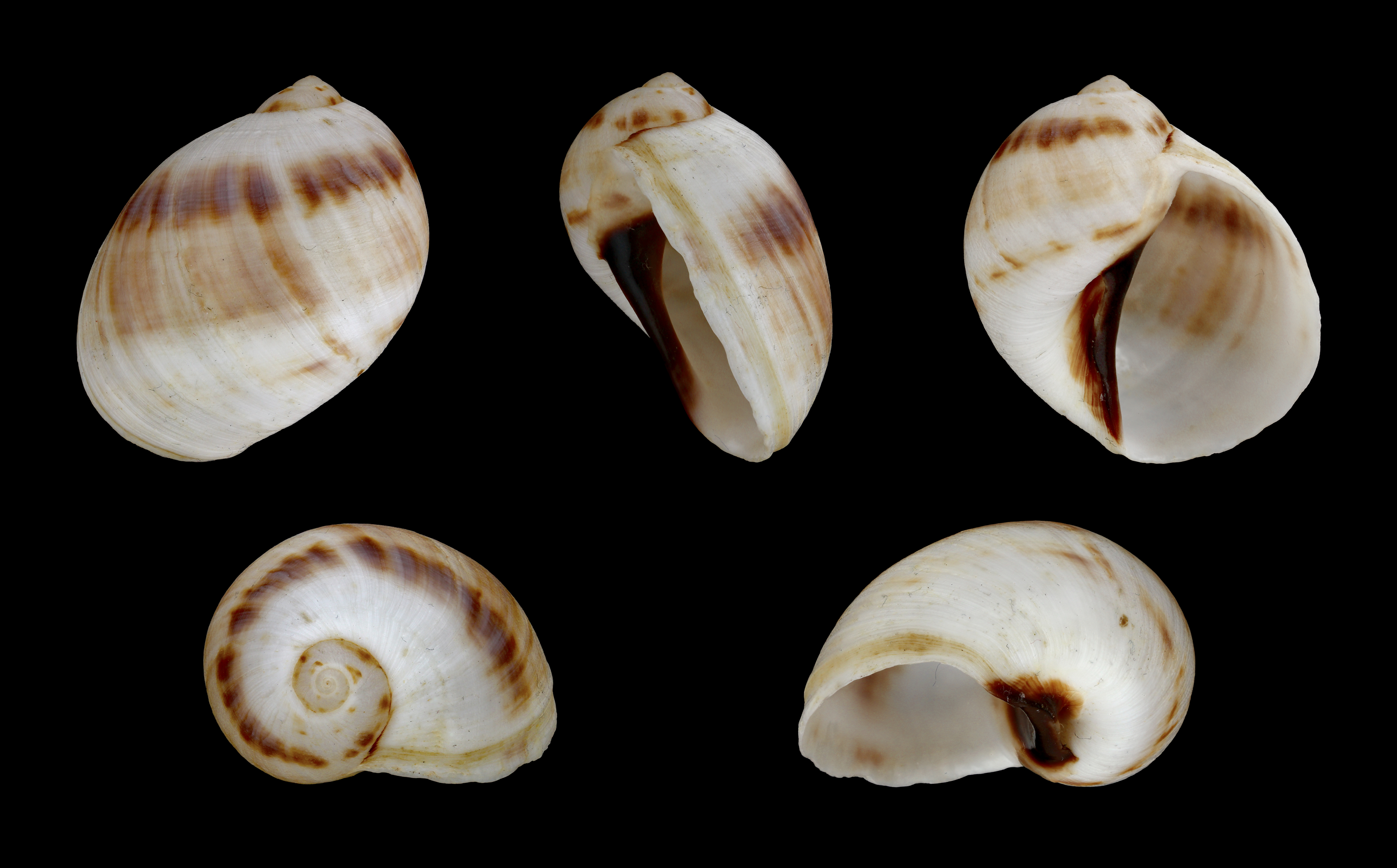
Mammilla sebae

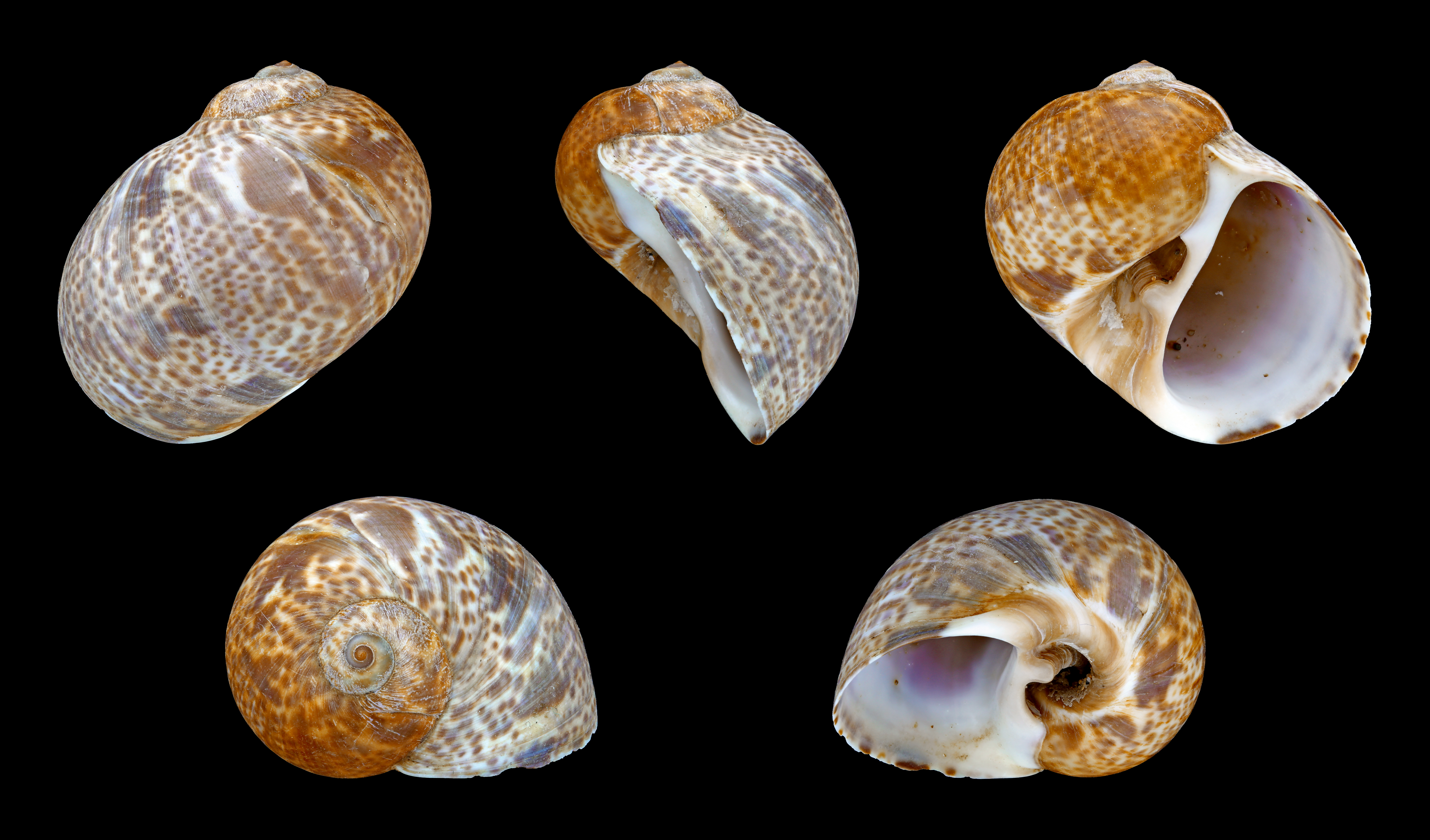
Natica hebraea

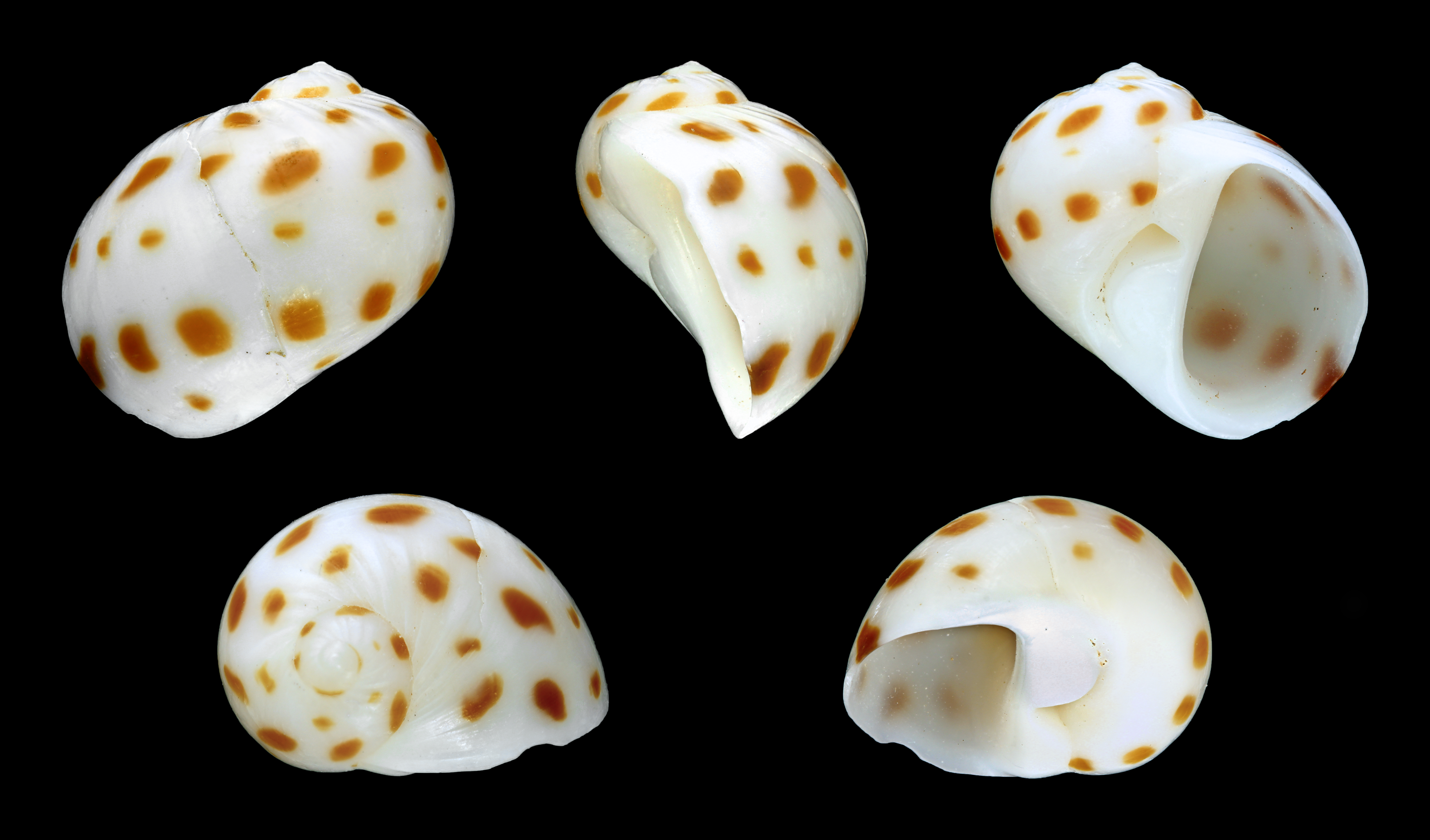
Naticarius onca

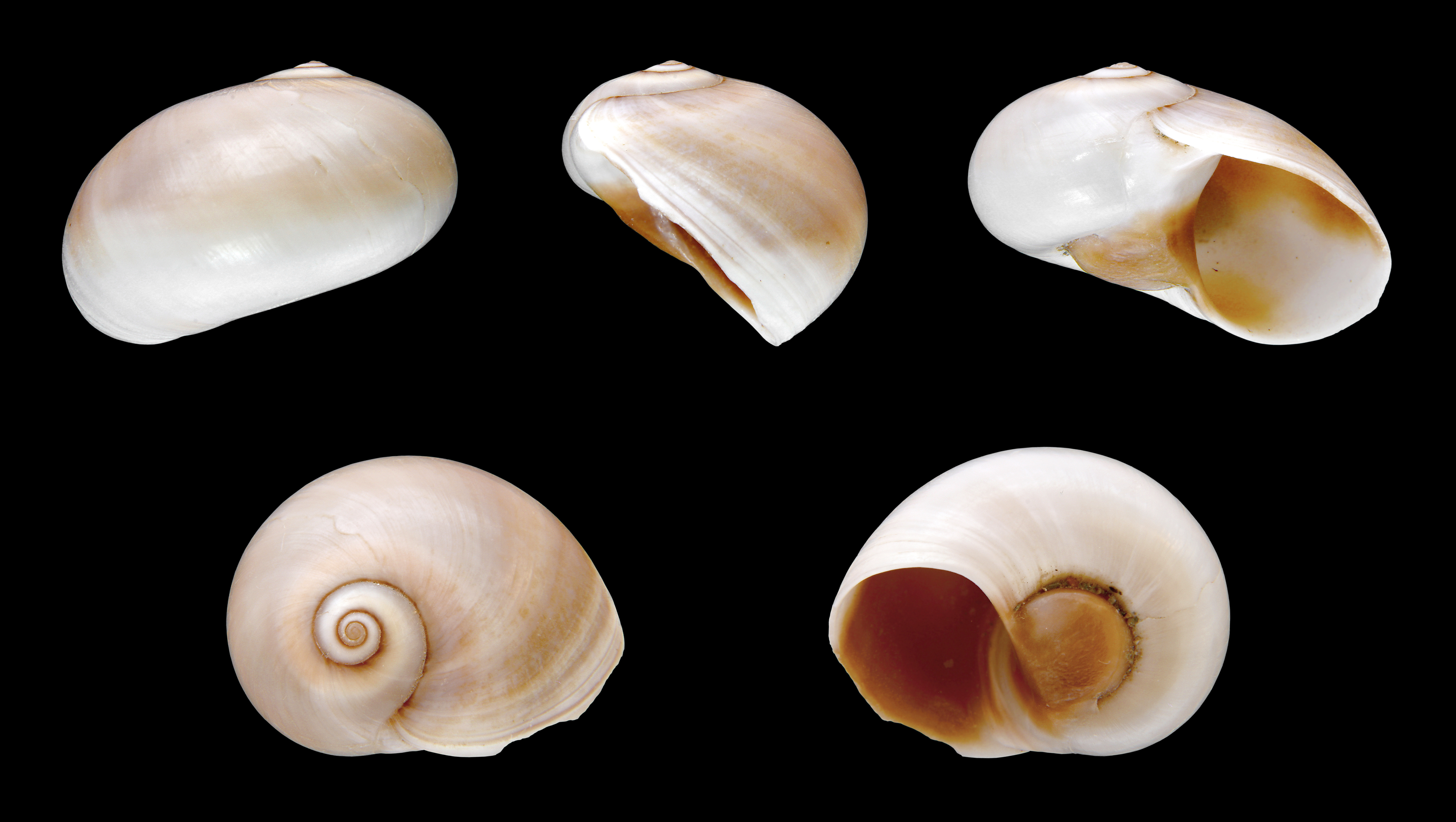
Neverita josephinia

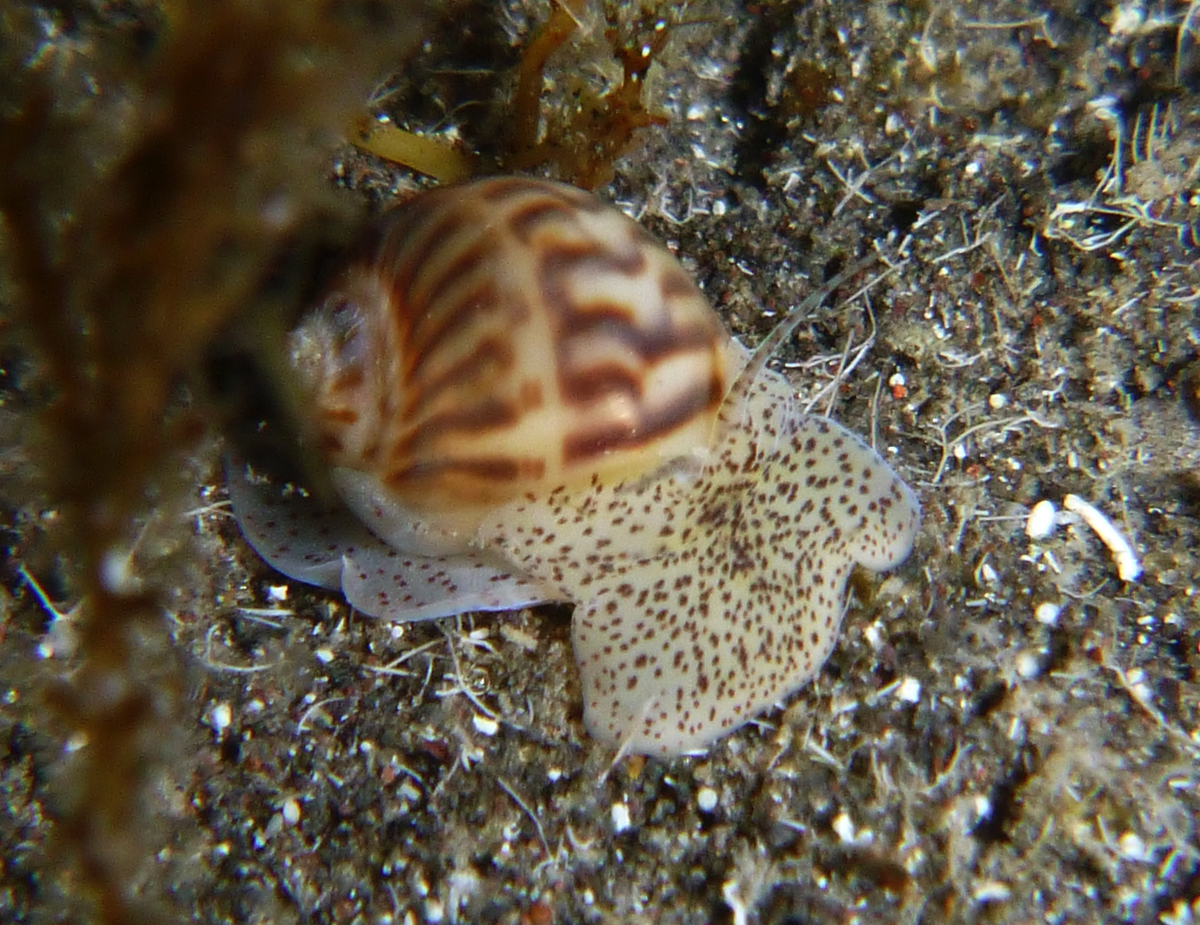
Notocochlis gualteriana

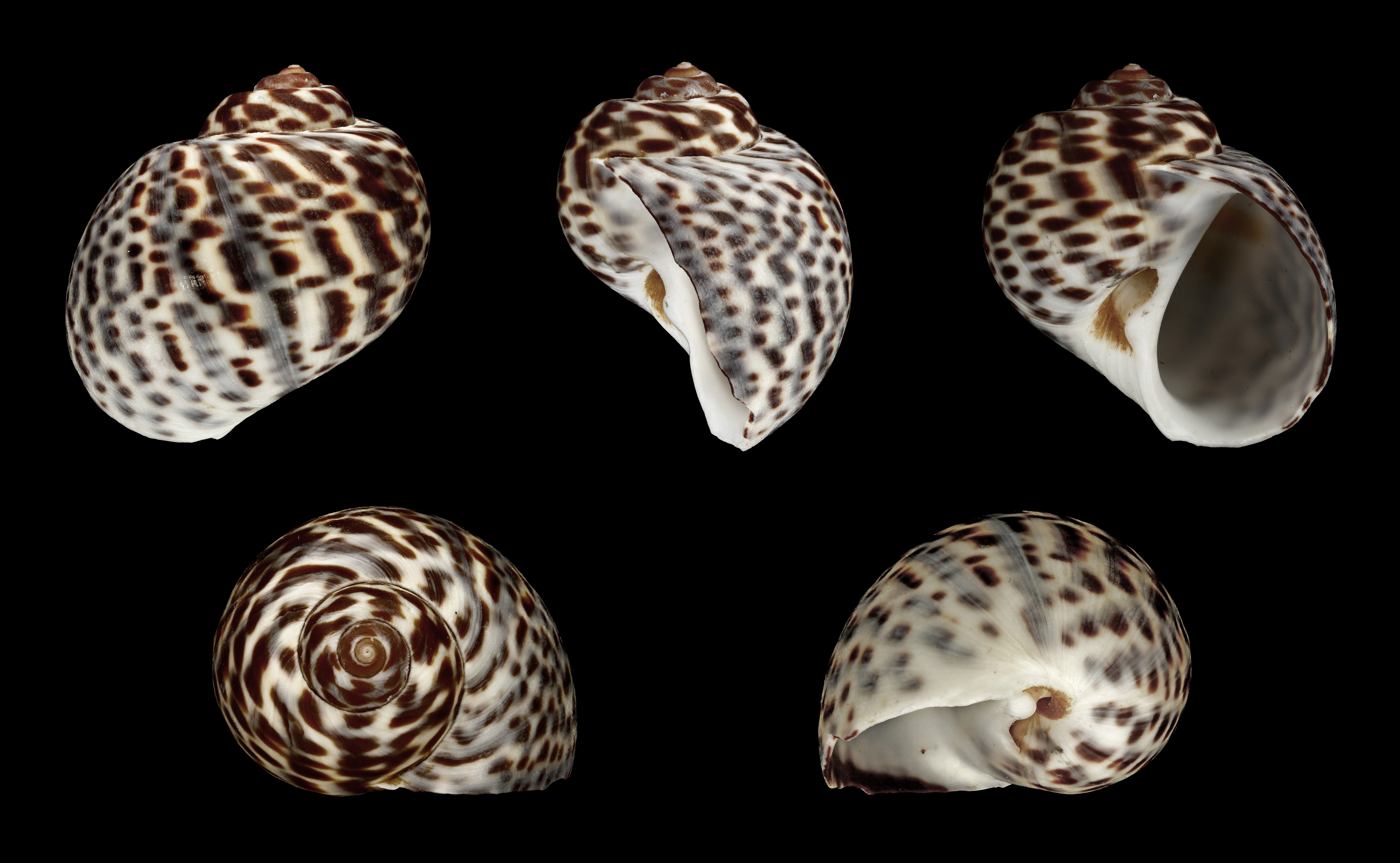
Notocochlis tigrina

Polinices mammilla

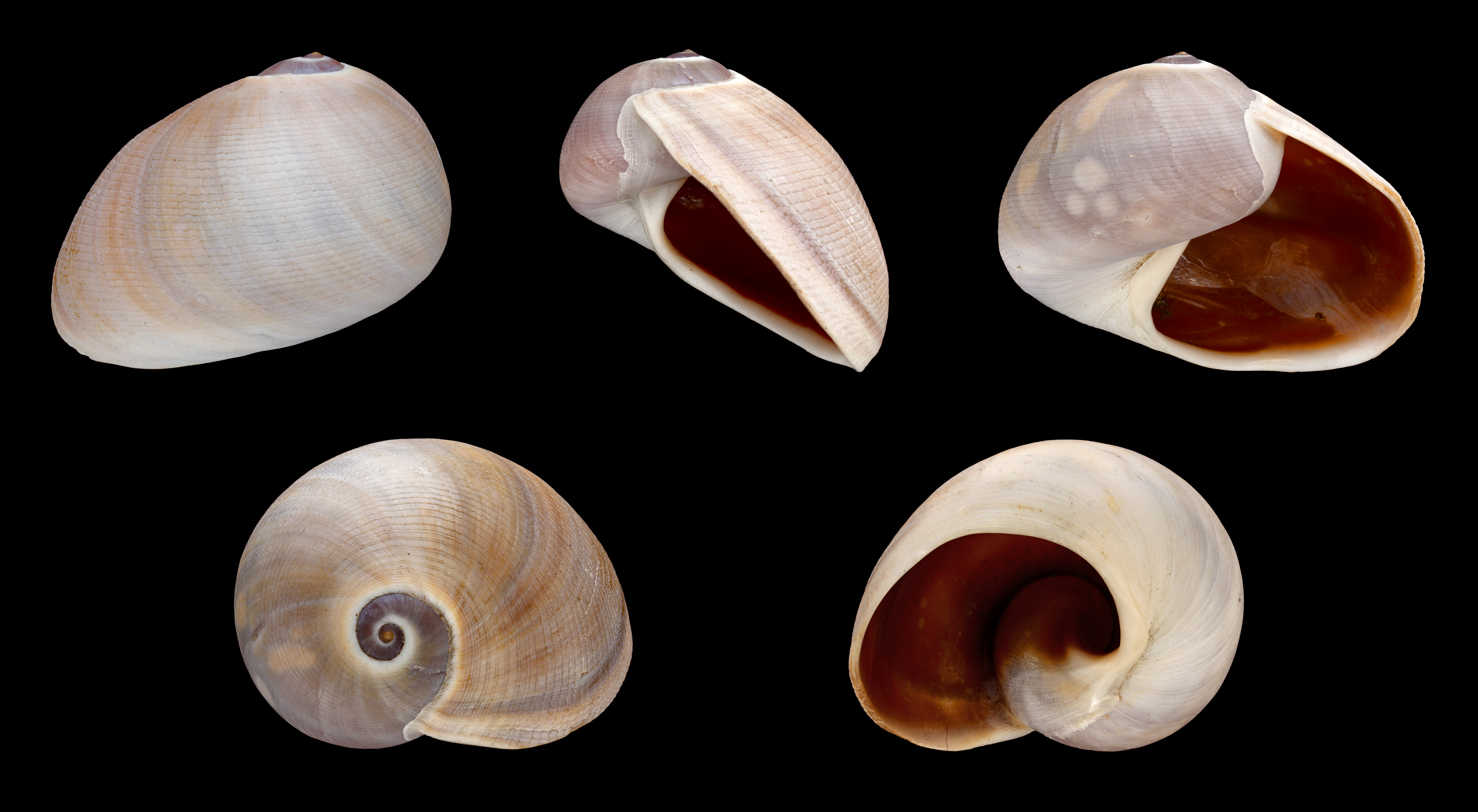
Sinum cymba

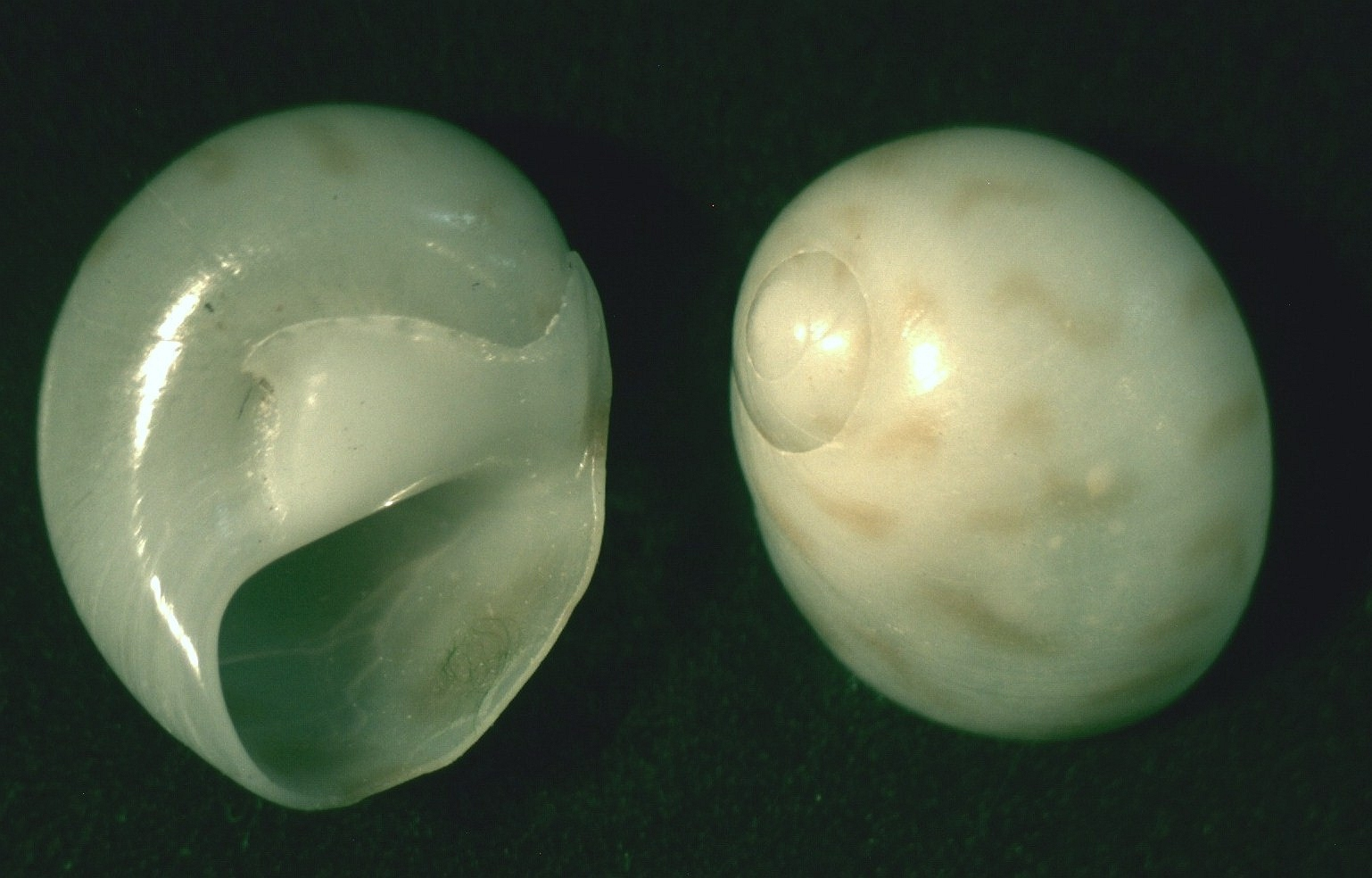
Tasmatica schoutanica

50-second video of snails (most likely Natica chemnitzi and Cerithium muscarum) feeding on the sea floor in the Gulf of California, Puerto Peñasco, Mexico.

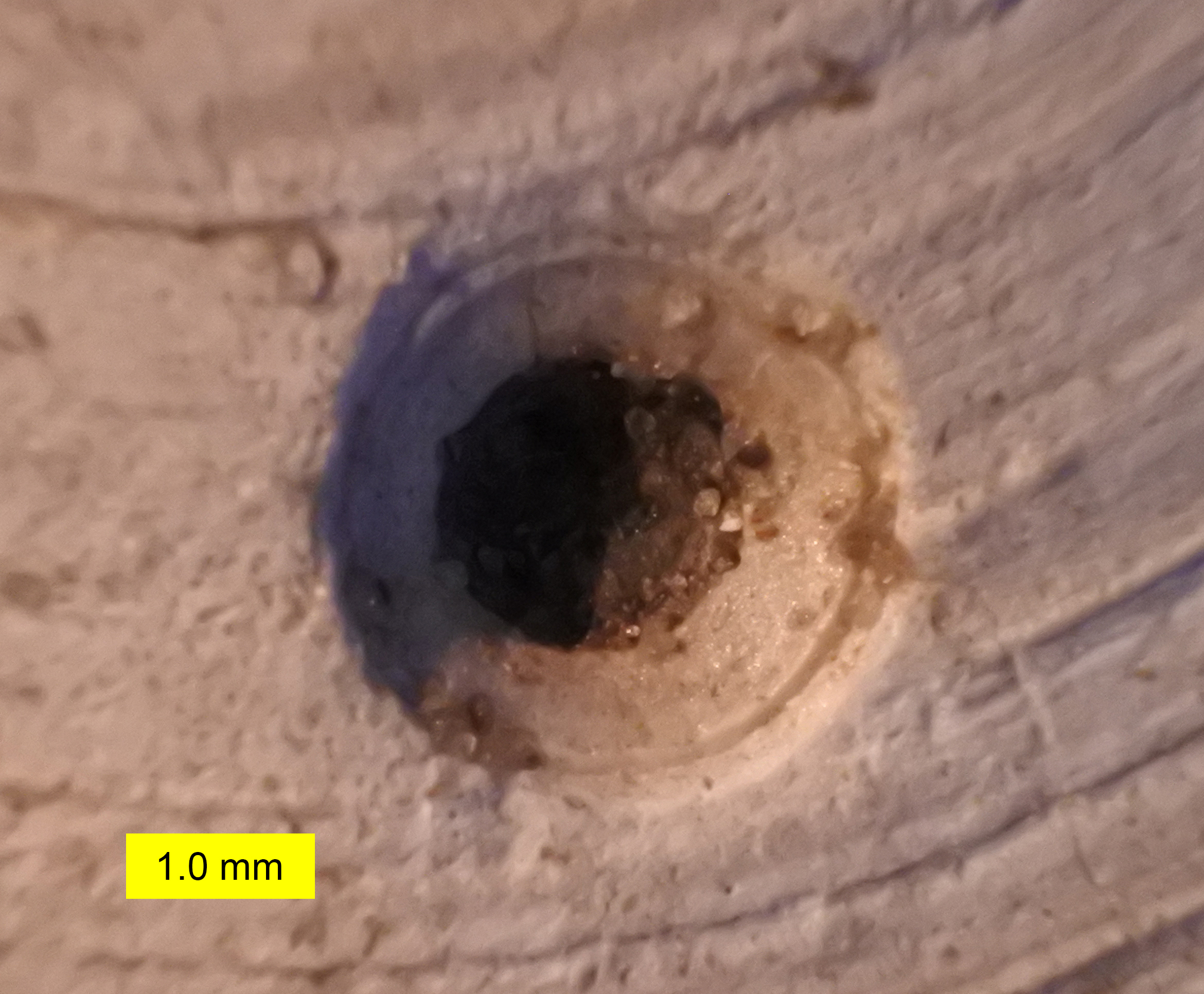
Naticid boring in Stewartia from the Calvert Formation, Zone 10, Calvert Co., MD (Miocene).

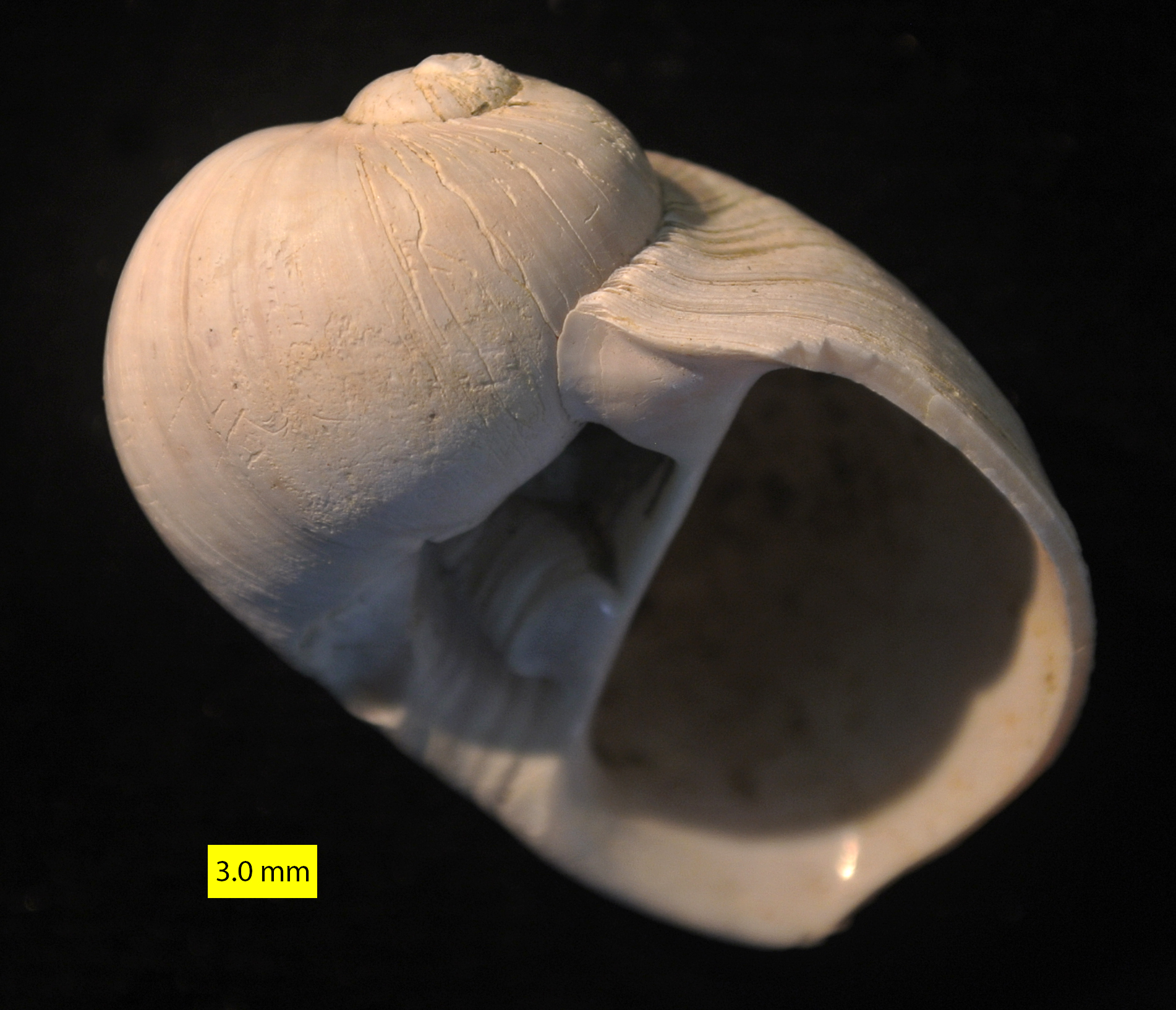
Fossil Naticarius millepunctatus; Nicosia Formation, Pliocene, Cyprus
