= Graphis rhyssa =

Scientific classification
- Kingdom: Animalia
- Phylum: Mollusca
- Class: Gastropoda
- Superfamily: Cimoidea
- Family: Cimidae
- Genus: Graphis
- Species: G. rhyssa

Binomial name
- Graphis rhyssa (Dall, 1927)

Synonyms
- Aclis rhyssa Dall, 1927 superseded combination

Species of gastropod

Graphis rhyssa is a species of sea snail, a marine gastropod mollusk in the family Eulimidae.

== Description ==
The length of the shell attains 6 mm, its diameter 1.3 mm.

(Original description) The small, slender shell is subcylindrical. It is translucent white and polished. It contains nine or ten well rounded whorls. The apex is blunt, the nuclear whorl is small and slightly tilted. The suture is constricted. The axial sculpture consists of numerous (on the body whorl about 15) somewhat sharp wrinkles, strongest at and behind the periphery where they sometimes give an obscurely angulate appearance just behind the middle of the whorl, and are a little retractively flexuous. The strength of these wrinkles varies in different specimens, some of them are nearly smooth on the later whorls. The base is evenly rounded and imperforate. The aperture is ovate, with thin margins.

== Distribution ==
This species occurs in the Atlantic Ocean off Fernandina Beach, Florida and Georgia, USA.
