= Batheulima =

Scientific classification
- Kingdom: Animalia
- Phylum: Mollusca
- Class: Gastropoda
- Subclass: Caenogastropoda
- Order: Littorinimorpha
- Family: Eulimidae
- Genus: Batheulima; F. Nordsieck, 1968

Type species
- Eulima fuscoapicata Jeffreys, 1884

Genus of gastropods

Batheulima is a genus of medium-sized sea snails, marine gastropod mollusks in the family Eulimidae.

== Distribution ==
- Marine

== Species ==
Species within the genus Batheulima include the following:

- Batheulima abbreviata (Jeffreys, 1884)
- Batheulima epixantha Simone, 2002
- Batheulima fuscoapicata (Jeffreys, 1884)
- Batheulima thurstoni Bouchet & Warén, 1986

Species brought into synonymy

- Batheulima apicofusca Locard, 1897: synonym of Batheulima fuscoapicata (Jefferys, 1884)
- Batheulima lutescens (Simone, 2002): synonym of Eulimacrostoma lutescens (Simone, 2002) (original combination)
