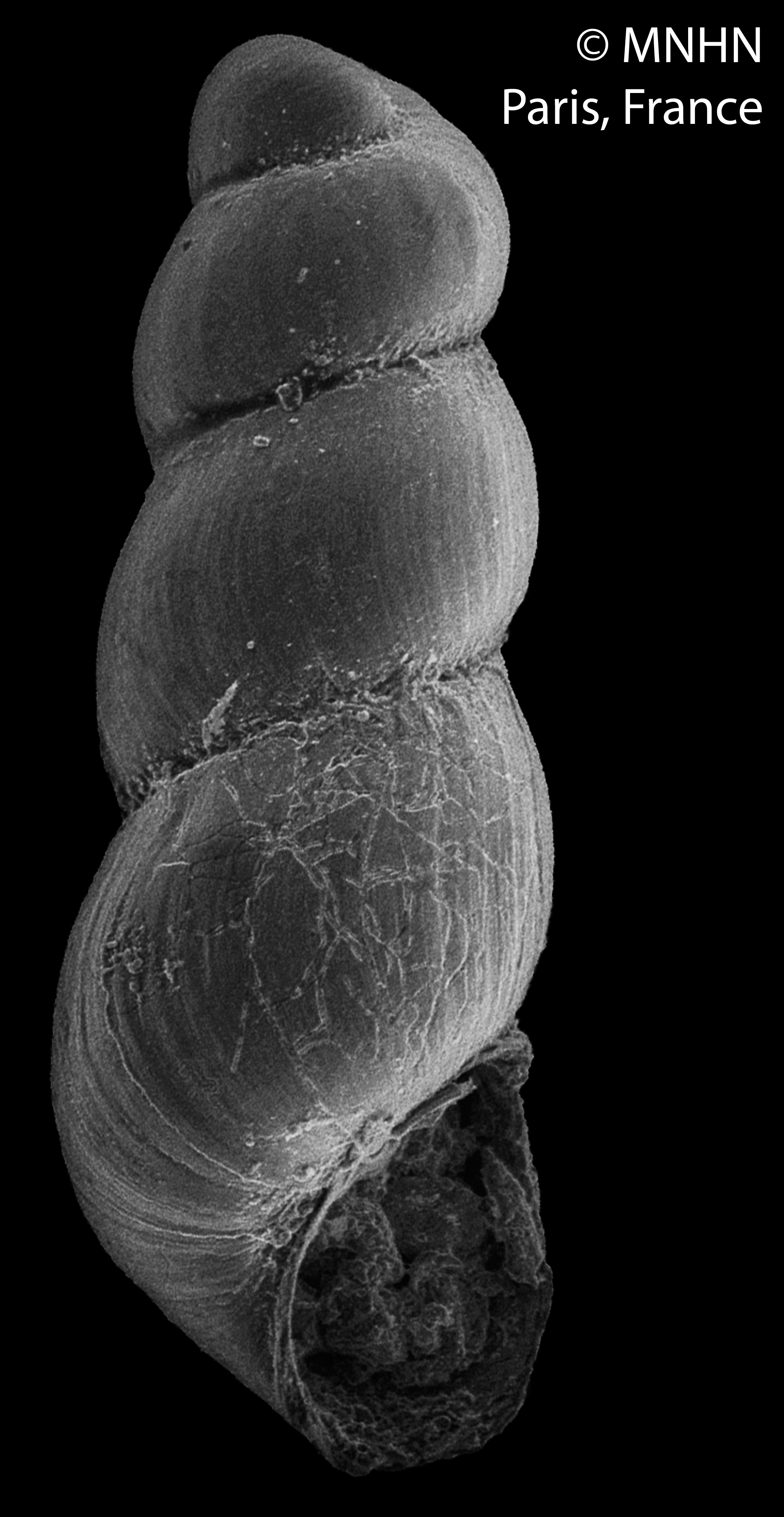
- Shell of Cima diminuta (holotype at MNHN, Paris)

Scientific classification
- Kingdom: Animalia
- Phylum: Mollusca
- Class: Gastropoda
- Subclass: Heterobranchia
- Infraclass: "Lower Heterobranchia"
- Superfamily: Cimoidea
- Family: Cimidae
- Genus: Cima; Chaster, 1896

Type species
- Cima minima (Jeffreys, 1858)

Species
- See text

= Cima (gastropod) =

Genus of molluscs

Cima is a genus of minute sea snails, marine gastropod molluscs in the family Cimidae.

== Species ==
- Cima apicisbelli Rolán, 2003
- Cima cuticulata Warén, 1993
- Cima cylindrica (Jeffreys, 1856)
- Cima diminuta Rolán & Rubio, 2018
- Cima inconspicua Warén, 1993
- Cima mingoranceae Rolán & Swinnen, 2014
- Cima minima (Jeffreys, 1858)
- † Cima neglecta (A. W. Janssen, 1969)
- † Cima oligocaenica Lozouet, 2015
- † Cima planorbiformis Lozouet, 2015
- † Cima proneglecta (R. Janssen, 1978)
- † Cima tenuispina Lozouet, 2015
- Cima urdunensis Bandel, 2005
- † Cima virodunensis Lozouet, 2015

Species brought into synonymy

- Cima gantensis Bandel, 2005: synonym of Mifsudia gantensis (Bandel, 2005) † (original combination)
- Cima melitensis Mifsud, 1998: synonym of Mifsudia melitensis (Mifsud, 1998) (original combination)
- Cima ventricosa (Forbes, 1844): synonym of Eulimella ventricosa (Forbes, 1844)
