= Cima minima =

Scientific classification
- Kingdom: Animalia
- Phylum: Mollusca
- Class: Gastropoda
- Family: Cimidae
- Genus: Cima
- Species: C. minima

Binomial name
- Cima minima (Jeffreys, 1858)

Synonyms
- Odostomia minima Jeffreys, 1858

Species of gastropod

Cima minima is a species of gastropods belonging to the family Cimidae. The shell is 0-8.1.5 mm high, the spire steeply conical, with 4-5 convex whorls, the shell is thin, transparent, and glossy.

The species is found in Europe. They have no eyes. They are hermaphrodites. Due to their small size, they do not have a heart, an osphradium or a ctenidium.
