= Coenaculum secundum =

Scientific classification
- Kingdom: Animalia
- Phylum: Mollusca
- Class: Gastropoda
- Family: Cimidae
- Genus: Coenaculum
- Species: C. secundum

Binomial name
- Coenaculum secundum Powell, 1937

Species of gastropod

Coenaculum secundum is a species of sea snail, a marine gastropod mollusk in the family Cimidae. The species is one of four known species to exist within the genus Coenaculum, with the other species being Coenaculum minutulum, Coenaculum tertium and Coenaculum weerdtae.

== Distribution ==
This marine species is endemic to New Zealand.
