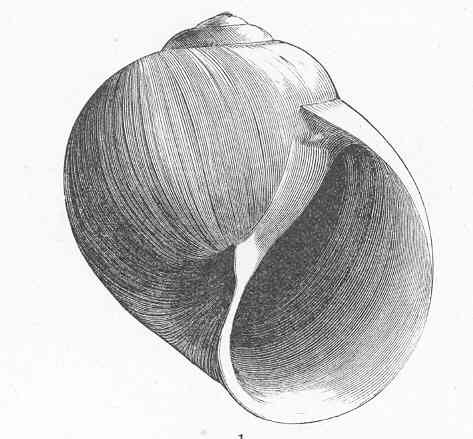
- Shell drawing by George Brown Goode

Scientific classification
- Kingdom: Animalia
- Phylum: Mollusca
- Class: Gastropoda
- Subclass: Caenogastropoda
- Order: Littorinimorpha
- Family: Naticidae
- Genus: Euspira
- Species: E. heros

Binomial name
- Euspira heros (Say, 1822)

Synonyms
- Lunatia heros; Natica ampullaria Lamarck, 1822; Natica heros Say, 1822 (basionym); Natica pomum Philippi, 1851; Polinices heros (Say, 1822)

= Euspira heros =

Species of large sea snail in the family Naticidae

Euspira heros, the northern moon snail, is a species of large sea snail in the family Naticidae. This large snail is rather uncommon intertidally, but is much more common subtidally. This species, like all moon snails, feeds voraciously on clams and other snails.

== Description ==
The shell of this species is globular and can, under the right conditions, grow up to 125 mm (4.9 in) long.

The operculum is large, ear-shaped in outline, and is corneous and somewhat transparent. On beaches where the shell of this species washed up commonly, the operculum will usually also be found washed up in the drift line.

== Distribution ==
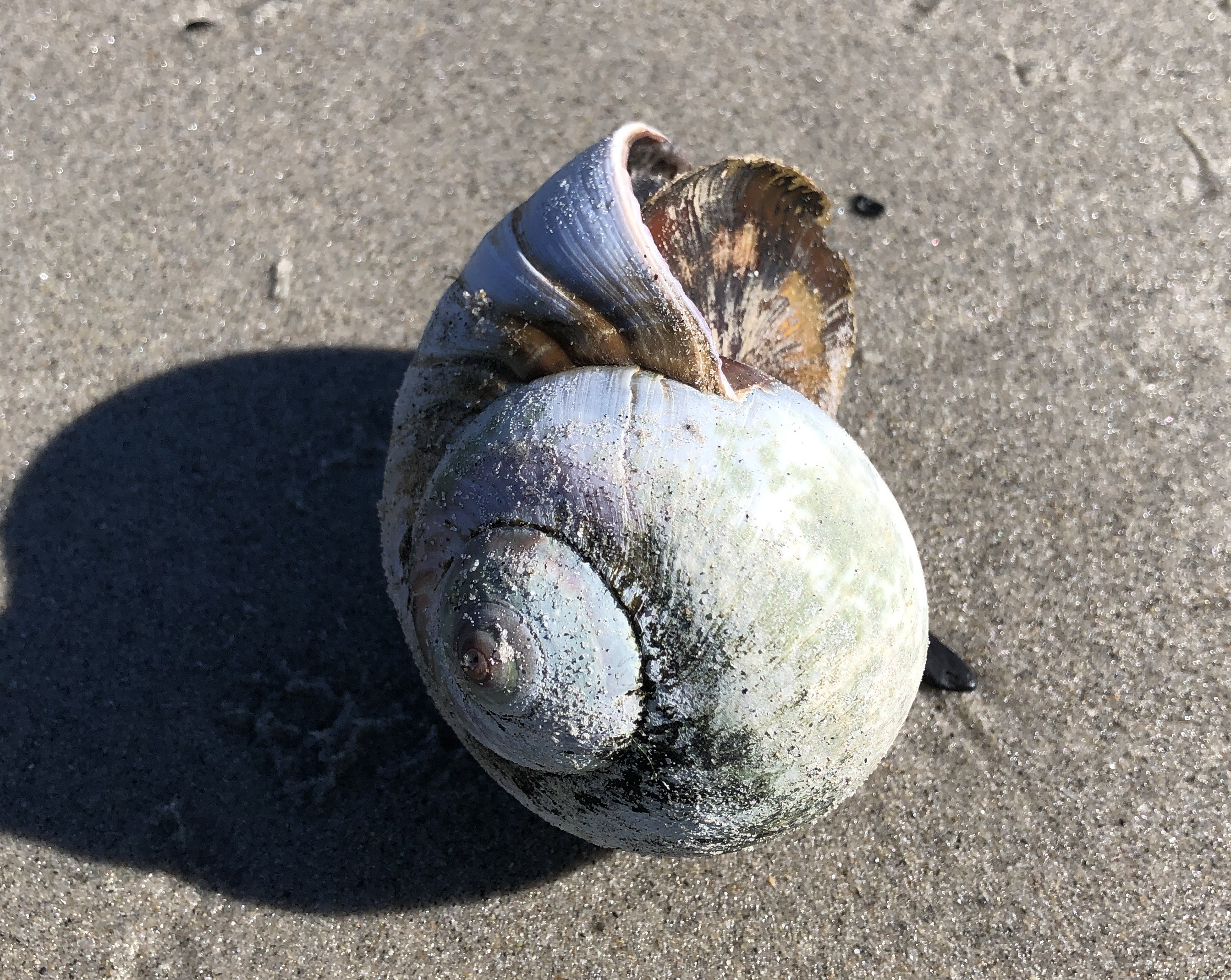
Northern Moon Snail (Euspira heros) on a beach in Southern Maine.

The distribution of Euspira heros falls within the range: 51.5°N to 33°N; 76°W to 65°W. This western Atlantic species occurs in:

- Canada: Labrador, Gulf of St. Lawrence, Quebec, Nova Scotia, New Brunswick
- USA: Massachusetts, Connecticut, New York, New Jersey, New Hampshire, Delaware, Maryland, Virginia, North Carolina, Maine

There is a sibling species on the Pacific coast of North America: Neverita lewisii.

== Habitat ==
Euspira heros lives on sand substrates in infralittoral, and circalittoral parts and estuary.

It has been found at the surface to depths up to 435 m (1,427 ft)

== Predation ==
Empty shells of clams and snails, including other moon snails, display evidence of predation by a moon snail when they are seen to have a neat "countersunk" hole drilled in them.

The powerful foot enables this gastropod to plow under the sand in search of other mollusks. Upon finding one, it "drills" a hole into the shell with its radula, releases digestive enzymes, and sucks out the somewhat predigested contents.
