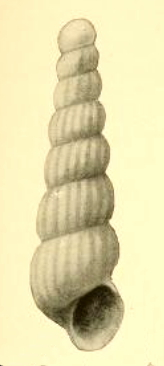
- Shell of Graphis cubana (holotype)

Scientific classification
- Kingdom: Animalia
- Phylum: Mollusca
- Class: Gastropoda
- Family: Cimidae
- Genus: Graphis
- Species: G. cubana

Binomial name
- Graphis cubana (Bartsch, 1911)

Synonyms
- Aclis cubana Bartsch, 1911

= Graphis cubana =

Species of gastropod

Graphis cubana is a species of sea snail, a marine gastropod mollusk in the family Eulimidae.

== Description ==
The length of the shell attains 4 mm, its diameter 1.1 mm.

(Original description) The small, slender, elongate-conic shell is milk-white. There are two whorls in the protoconch, the first very much inflated, strongly rounded, and larger than the early post-nuclear whorls. The whorls of the teleoconch are well rounded and appressed at the summit. They are sculptured with somewhat irregular, feebly developed axial ribs, of which 18 occur upon the first and second, 20 upon the third and fourth, and 22 upon the penultimate whorl. The sutures are strongly constricted. The periphery of the body whorl is marked by a very feeble, slender spiral cord. The base of the shell is short and well rounded. It is marked by the feeble continuations of the axial ribs. The aperture is very broadly ovate. The posterior angle is obtuse. The outer lip is very thin, showing the external sculpture within. The columella is very slender, decidedly curved and feebly revolute.

== Distribution ==
This marine species occurs off Cuba.
