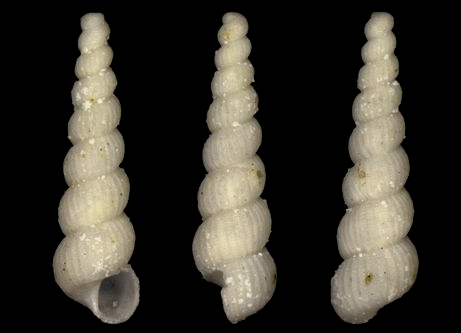
- Shell of † Graphis eocenica (specimen at MNHN, Paris)

Scientific classification
- Kingdom: Animalia
- Phylum: Mollusca
- Class: Gastropoda
- Infraclass: "Lower Heterobranchia"
- Superfamily: Cimoidea
- Family: Cimidae
- Genus: Graphis; Jeffreys, 1867

Type species
- Turbo unicus Montagu, 1803

Synonyms
- Aclis (Graphis) Jeffreys, 1867; Cioniscus Jeffreys, 1869; Graphis (Graphis) Jeffreys, 1867

= Graphis (gastropod) =

Genus of gastropods

Graphis is a genus of medium-sized sea snails, marine gastropod molluscs in the family Cimidae.

== Species ==
The species within this genus include:

- Graphis africana Bartsch, 1915
- Graphis albida (Kanmacher, 1798)
- Graphis ambigua (Weisbord, 1962)
- Graphis barashi van Aartsen, 2002
- Graphis blanda (Finlay, 1924)
- † Graphis bouryi (Cossmann, 1888)
- Graphis cubana (Bartsch, 1911)
- † Graphis discreta (Fenaux, 1938)
- Graphis eikenboomi van der Linden & Moolenbeek, 2004
- † Graphis eocenica (de Boury, 1887)
- † Graphis eugenii (Deshayes, 1861)
- † Graphis gallica (de Boury, 1912)
- Graphis gracilis (Monterosato, 1874)
- Graphis infans (Laseron, 1951)
- † Graphis laevigata Gougerot & Le Renard, 1977
- Graphis lightbourni van der Linden & Moolenbeek, 2004
- Graphis menkhorsti De Jong & Coomans, 1988
- † Graphis minutissima (Deshayes, 1861)
- † Graphis neozelanica Laws, 1939
- Graphis pacifica Bandel, 2005
- Graphis perrierae Barros, Lima Silva Mello, Barros, Lima, Do Carmo Ferrão Santos, Cabral & Padovan, 2003
- † Graphis peruviana Chira, Chanamé & Kajihara, 2017
- † Graphis praeunica Gougerot & Le Renard, 1977
- † Graphis problanda Laws, 1944
- Graphis pruinosa Gofas & Rueda, 2014
- Graphis rhyssa (Dall, 1927)
- Graphis sculpturata (Oliver, 1915)
- Graphis striata (Jeffreys, 1884)
- Graphis tenuissima (Hedley, 1909)
- † Graphis timida (Deshayes, 1861)
- Graphis underwoodae Bartsch, 1947
