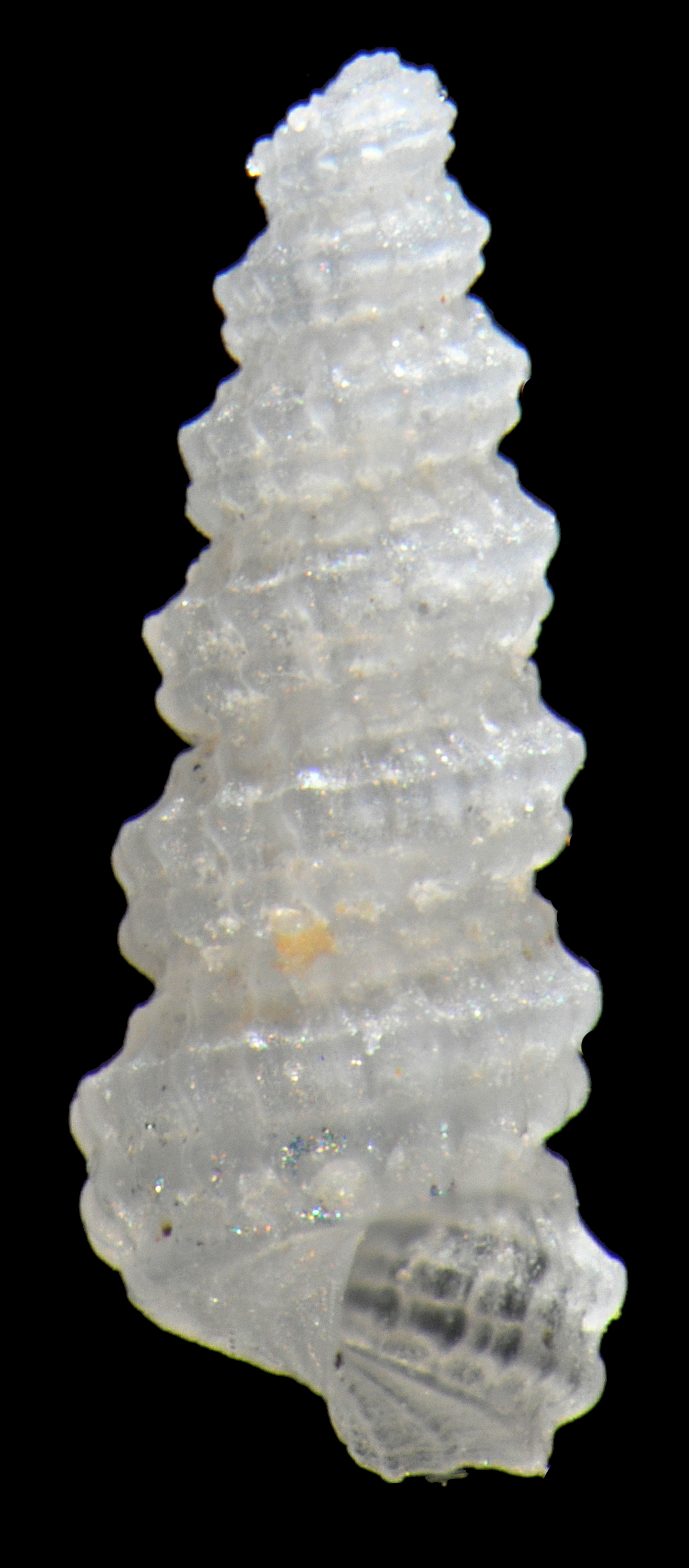
- Shell of Coenaculum bangkaense (holotype at MNHN, Paris)

Scientific classification
- Kingdom: Animalia
- Phylum: Mollusca
- Class: Gastropoda
- Infraclass: "Lower Heterobranchia"
- Superfamily: Cimoidea
- Family: Cimidae
- Genus: Coenaculum; Iredale, 1924

Type species
- Scala minutula Tate & May, 1900

Synonyms
- Graphis (Coenaculum) Iredale, 1924

= Coenaculum (gastropod) =

Genus of gastropods

Coenaculum is a genus of medium-sized sea snails, marine gastropod molluscs in the family Cimidae.

== Species ==
The species within this genus include:

- Coenaculum bangkaense Cecalupo & Perugia, 2020
- Coenaculum minutulum (Tate & May, 1900)
- Coenaculum secundum (Powell, 1937)
- Coenaculum tertium (Dell, 1952)
- Coenaculum weerdtae (Moolenbeek & Faber, 1992)
