= Coenaculum minutulum =

Scientific classification
- Kingdom: Animalia
- Phylum: Mollusca
- Class: Gastropoda
- Family: Cimidae
- Genus: Coenaculum
- Species: C. minutulum

Binomial name
- Coenaculum minutulum Tate & May, 1900

Synonyms
- Awanuia minutula (Tate & May, 1900); Scala minutula Tate & May, 1900; Scalaria minutula Tate & May, 1900

Species of gastropod

Coenaculum minutulum is a species of sea snail, a marine gastropod mollusk in the family Cimidae. The species is one of four known species to exist within the genus, Coenaculum with the other species being Coenaculum secundum, Coenaculum tertium and Coenaculum weerdtae.
