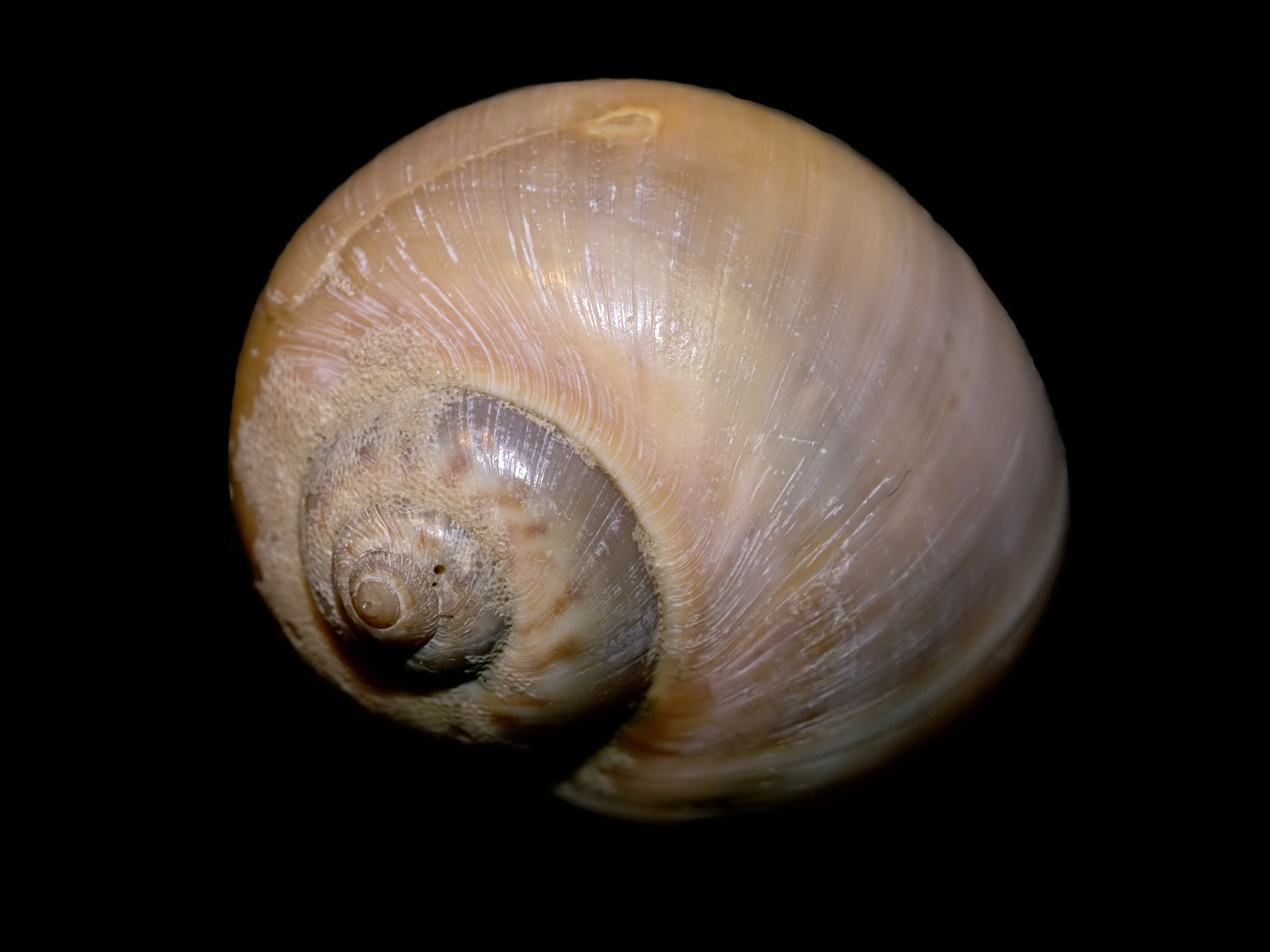
- Shells of Euspira catena

Scientific classification
- Kingdom: Animalia
- Phylum: Mollusca
- Class: Gastropoda
- Subclass: Caenogastropoda
- Order: Littorinimorpha
- Family: Naticidae
- Genus: Euspira
- Species: E. catena

Binomial name
- Euspira catena (da Costa, 1778)

Synonyms
- Lunatia catena (da Costa, 1778); Lunatia catena da Costa, 1778; Lunatia monilifera Lamarck, 1822; Natica castanea Lamarck, 1822; Natica catena da Costa, 1778; Natica monilifera Lamarck, 1822; Polinices catena da Costa, 1778; Polinices monilifera Lamarck, 1822; Polinices (Euspira) catena (Da Costa, 1778); Polinices (Lunatia) catena (da Costa, 1778); Polinices (Lunatia) monilifera (Lamarck, 1822)

= Euspira catena =

Euspira catena Temporal range: Miocene - Recent

Species of gastropod

Euspira catena, previously known as Natica catena, common name the large necklace shell, is a medium-sized species of predatory sea snail, a marine gastropod mollusc in the family Naticidae, the moon snails.

== Fossil records ==
The fossil record of this species dates back to the Miocene (age range: 13.65 to 0.012 million years ago). These fossils have been found in Morocco, the Netherlands, Spain, Italy, United Kingdom and Slovakia.

== Description ==
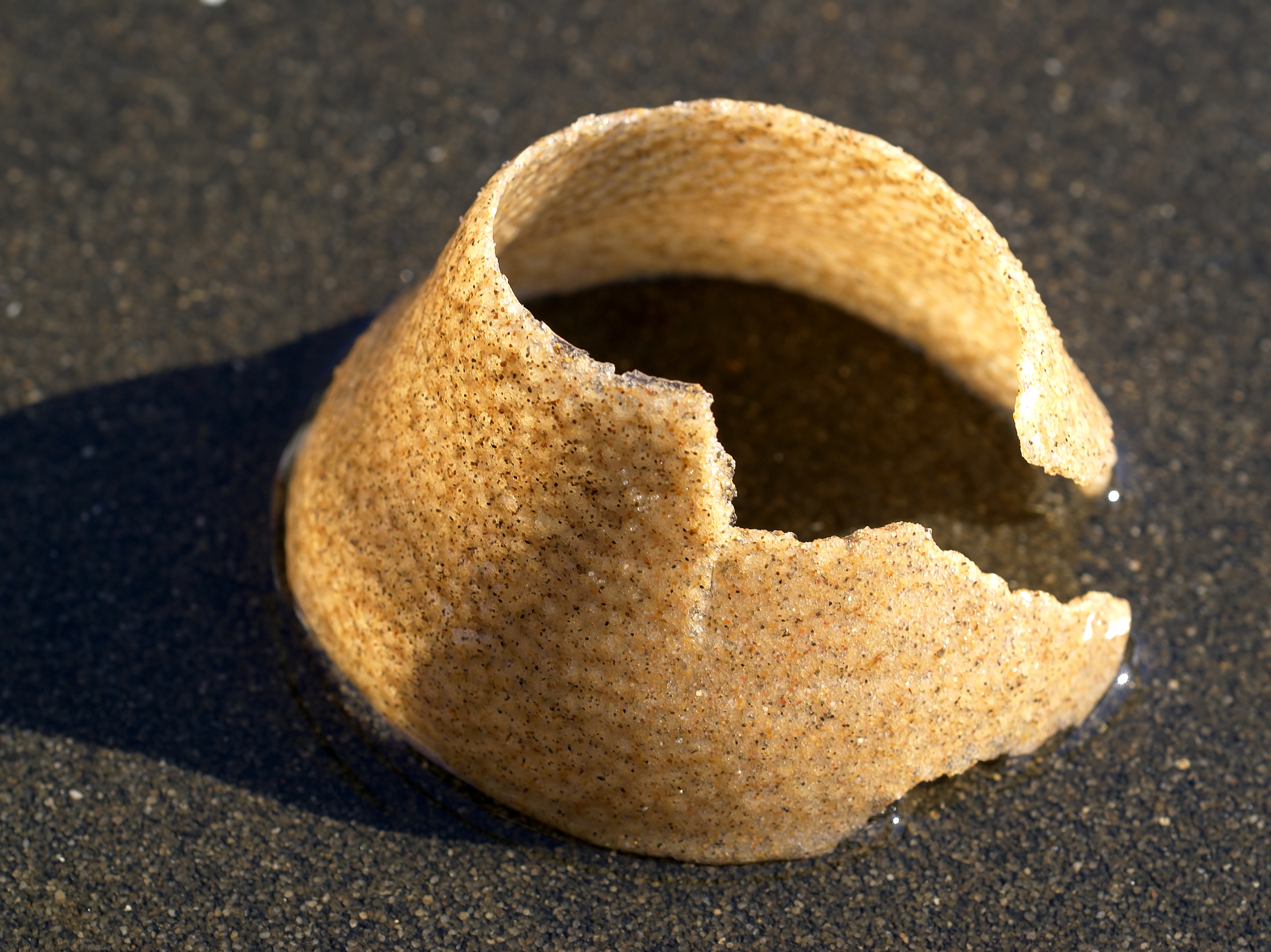
The sand collar egg mass of Euspira catena

The rounded shell is thin and polished and brownish-yellow, with a row of reddish markings just below the suture of the last whorl. It can grow to about 3 cm (1 in) and has a short spire and seven rounded whorls separated with distinct sutures. The lowest whorl occupies about 90% of the volume. It has a large umbilicus and the operculum is ear-shaped and spirally wound.

The foot is cream coloured and very large, partially covering the shell when the animal is moving. The head has two long flattened tentacles and a short snout with extensible proboscis.

The large necklace shell might be confused with a similar but smaller species, the common necklace shell (Euspira pulchella).

== Distribution ==
The large necklace shell is found on the coasts of Northwest Europe, from the Mediterranean Sea to the Skagerrak and in the Northeast Atlantic Ocean.

== Biology ==
The large necklace shell lives buried in the sand and gravel of the lower shore and the neritic zone to depths of 125 metres. It feeds on bivalve molluscs, penetrating their shells with its proboscis and sucking out the contents.

Egg capsules are laid in a spirally wound collar of jelly embedded with sand grains. The remains of these may be found on the beach.

== Bibliography ==
- Backeljau, T. (1986). Lijst van de recente mariene mollusken van België [List of the recent marine molluscs of Belgium]. Koninklijk Belgisch Instituut voor Natuurwetenschappen: Brussels, Belgium. 106 pp.
- Gofas, S.; Le Renard, J.; Bouchet, P. (2001). Mollusca, in: Costello, M.J. et al. (Ed.) (2001). European register of marine species: a check-list of the marine species in Europe and a bibliography of guides to their identification. Collection Patrimoines Naturels, 50: pp. 180–213

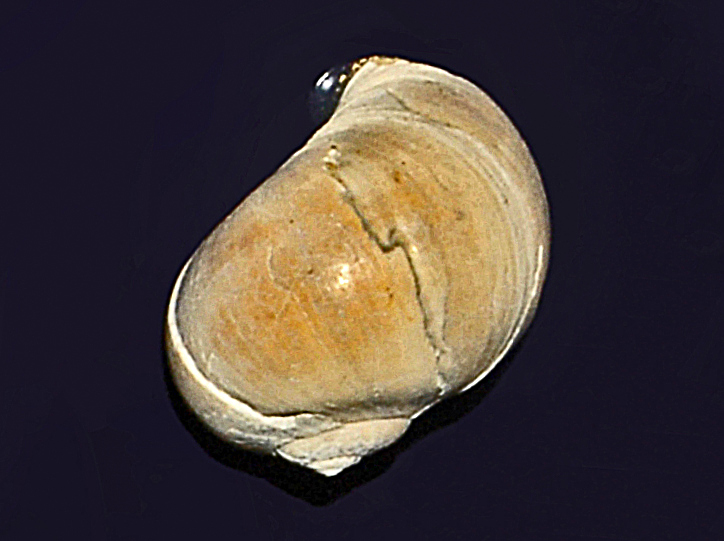
Fossil shell of Euspira catena from Pliocene of Italy

- Muller, Y. (2004). Faune et flore du littoral du Nord, du Pas-de-Calais et de la Belgique: inventaire. [Coastal fauna and flora of the Nord, Pas-de-Calais and Belgium: inventory]. Commission Régionale de Biologie Région Nord Pas-de-Calais: France. 307 pp.
- Torigoe K. & Inaba A. (2011) Revision on the classification of Recent Naticidae. Bulletin of the Nishinomiya Shell Museum 7: 133 + 15 pp., 4 pls
