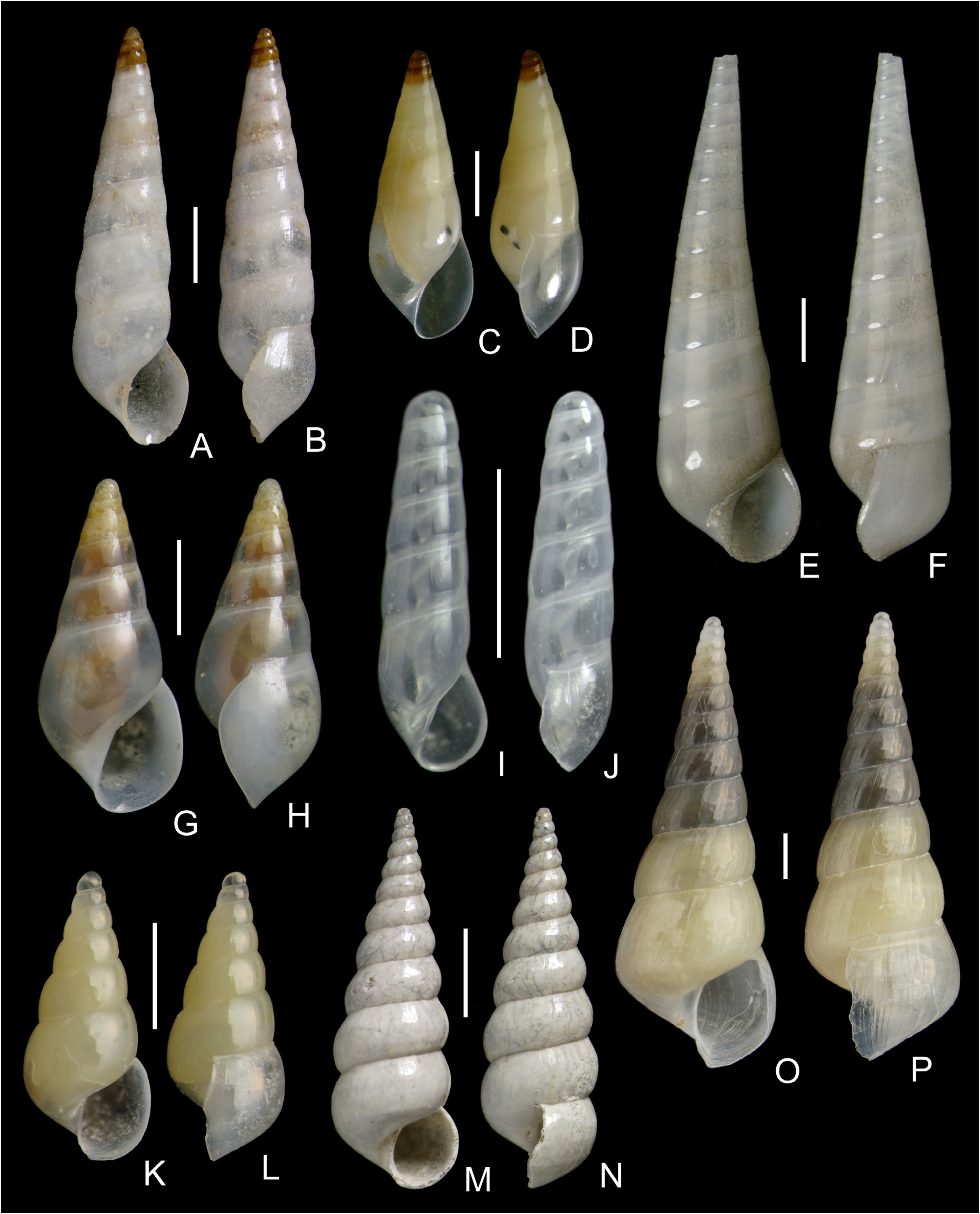
- Batheulima fuscopicata in position A (top left) among other mollusc shells

Scientific classification
- Kingdom: Animalia
- Phylum: Mollusca
- Class: Gastropoda
- Subclass: Caenogastropoda
- Order: Littorinimorpha
- Family: Eulimidae
- Genus: Batheulima
- Species: B. fuscopicata

Binomial name
- Batheulima fuscopicata (Jeffreys, 1884)

Synonyms
- Batheulima apicofusca Locard, 1897; Eulima apicofusca Locard, 1897; Eulima fuscoapicata Jeffreys, 1844

= Batheulima fuscoapicata =

Species of gastropod

Batheulima fuscopicata is a species of sea snail, a marine gastropod mollusc in the family Eulimidae.

== Distribution ==
This marine species is found in the following locations:

- Cape Verde archipelago
- European waters (ERMS scope)
- Northern Spain

== Description ==
The maximum recorded shell length is 4 mm.

== Habitat ==
Minimum recorded depth is 805 m. Maximum recorded depth is 805 m.
