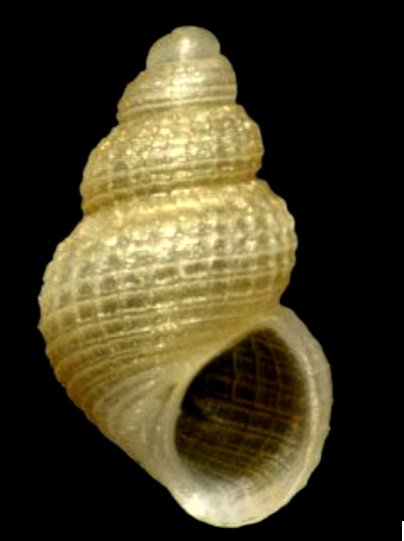
- Shell of Alvania parvula (specimen at the Natural History Museum, Rotterdam)

Scientific classification
- Kingdom: Animalia
- Phylum: Mollusca
- Class: Gastropoda
- Subclass: Caenogastropoda
- Order: Littorinimorpha
- Superfamily: Rissooidea
- Family: Rissoidae
- Genus: Alvania
- Species: A. parvula

Binomial name
- Alvania parvula (Jeffreys, 1884)

Synonyms
- Rissoa parvula Jeffreys, 1884

= Alvania parvula =

Species of gastropod

Alvania parvula is a species of small sea snail, a marine gastropod mollusk or micromollusk in the family Rissoidae.

== Description ==
(Original description) The oblong shell is comparatively solid, semitransparent, nearly lustreless. The colour of the shell is pale yellowish

The sculpture consists of about 20 longitudinal and somewhat curved riblets on the body whorl, which are not continued much below the periphery. Each of the two succeeding whorls has 14 to 16 similar riblets. All of these are crossed by spiral riblets or striae, of which there are about 10 on the body whorl and 4 to 6 on the penultimate and next whorls. The topmost whorl is encircled by microscopic lines. The intercrossing of the longitudinal and spiral riblets does not form tubercles or prickles at the points of junction. The interstices are square.

The spire is rather slender. It contains 4 whorls, slightly convex, the last occupying two thirds of the spire. The apex is blunt. The suture is distinct, but not deep. The aperture is more round than oval. The outer lip is thin and smooth within The inner lip is somewhat reflected and thickened on the lower part of the columella, which is imperforate.

== Distribution ==
This species occurs in the Alboran Sea, Western Mediterranean Sea; in the Atlantic ocean off Morocco and Senegal.
