= Coenaculum weerdtae =

Scientific classification
- Kingdom: Animalia
- Phylum: Mollusca
- Class: Gastropoda
- Family: Cimidae
- Genus: Coenaculum
- Species: C. weerdtae

Binomial name
- Coenaculum weerdtae Moolenbeek & Faber, 1992

Species of gastropod

Coenaculum weerdtae is a species of sea snail, a marine gastropod mollusc in the family Cimidae. The species is one of four known species to exist within the genus Coenaculum, the other three being Coenaculum minutulum, Coenaculum secundum and Coenaculum tertium.

== Description ==
The maximum recorded shell length is 2.1 mm.

== Habitat ==
Minimum recorded depth is 30 m. Maximum recorded depth is 30 m.
