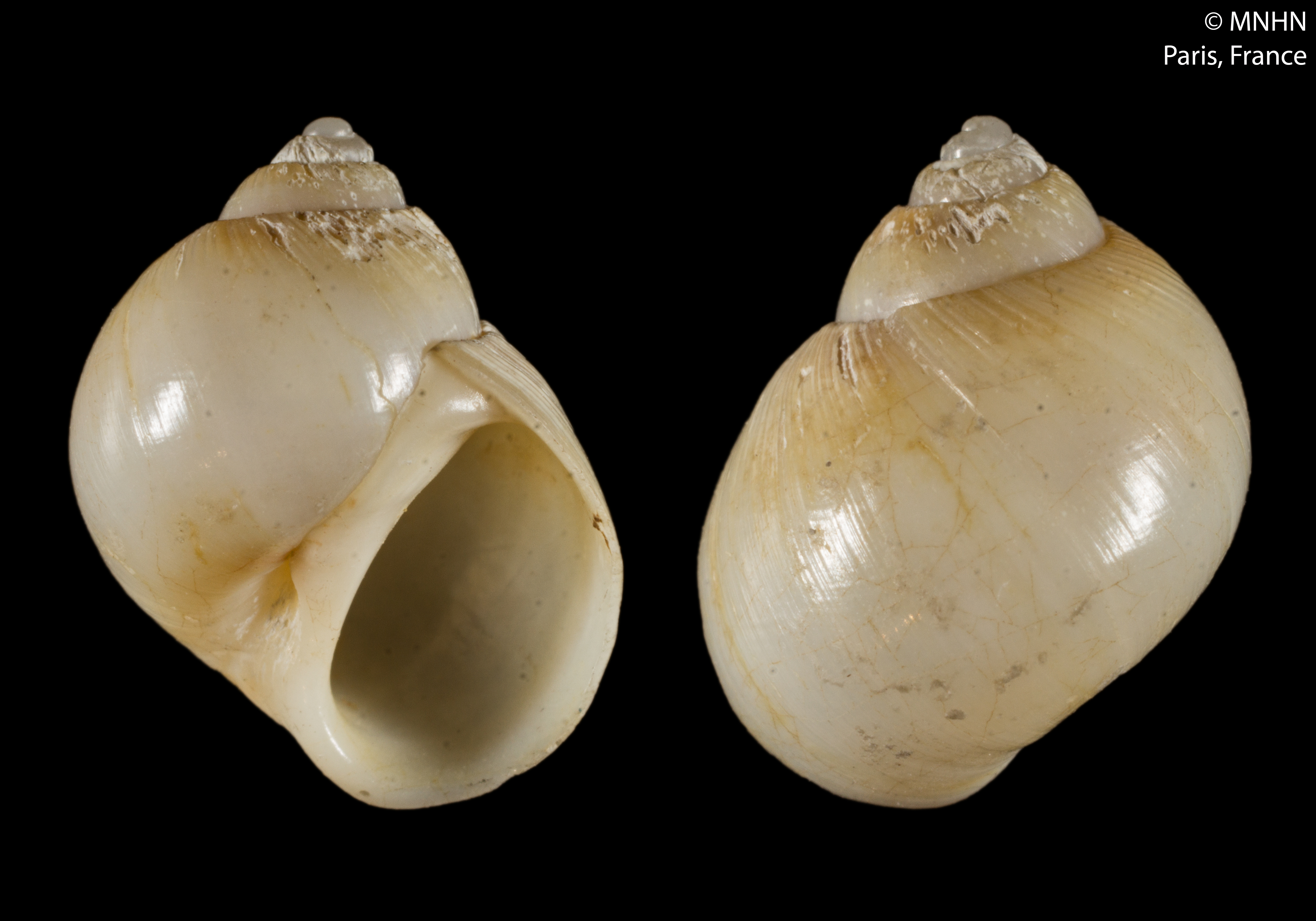
- Shell of Euspira subplicata (lectotype at MNHN, Paris)

Scientific classification
- Kingdom: Animalia
- Phylum: Mollusca
- Class: Gastropoda
- Subclass: Caenogastropoda
- Order: Littorinimorpha
- Family: Naticidae
- Genus: Euspira
- Species: E. subplicata

Binomial name
- Euspira subplicata (Jeffreys, 1885)

Synonyms
- Natica amabilis Locard, 1897; Natica extenta Locard, 1897; Natica olivella var. minor Locard, 1897; Natica prosistens Locard, 1897; Natica subplicata Jeffreys, 1885 (original combination); Polinices subplicata (Jeffreys, 1880)

= Euspira subplicata =

Species of gastropod

Euspira subplicata is a species of predatory sea snail, a marine gastropod mollusc in the family Naticidae, commonly known as then moon snails.

== Description ==
The length of the shell attains 5 to 12 mm.

== Distribution ==
This species occurs in the Atlantic Ocean off Morocco, Cabo Verde, and Spain.
