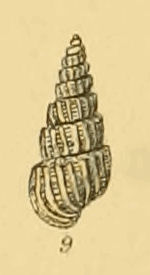

Scientific classification
- Kingdom: Animalia
- Phylum: Mollusca
- Class: Gastropoda
- Family: Pyramidellidae
- Genus: Turbonilla
- Species: T. jeffreysii

Binomial name
- Turbonilla jeffreysii (Jeffreys, 1848)

Synonyms
- Dunkeria jeffreysii (Jeffreys, 1848); Melania scalaris Philippi, 1836; Odostomia scalaris (Philippi, 1836); Odostomia scalaris var. jeffreysii Jeffreys, 1848; Turbonilla scalaris (Philippi, 1836)

= Turbonilla jeffreysii =

Species of gastropod

Turbonilla jeffreysii is a species of sea snail, a marine gastropod mollusk in the family Pyramidellidae, the pyrams and their allies.

== Description ==
The length of the shell varies between 1.8 mm and 6 mm. This species, like others in its genus, is small and slender, characterized by its scalaroid shape. The species typically features numerous whorls, each adorned with fine, intricate patterns or ridges that can vary in appearance among individuals.

== Distribution ==
This species occurs in the following locations:

- European waters (ERMS scope)
- Greek Exclusive Economic Zone
- Irish Exclusive economic Zone
- Portuguese Exclusive Economic Zone
- Spanish Exclusive Economic Zone
- United Kingdom Exclusive Economic Zone
