= Coenaculum tertium =

Scientific classification
- Kingdom: Animalia
- Phylum: Mollusca
- Class: Gastropoda
- Family: Cimidae
- Genus: Coenaculum
- Species: C. tertium

Binomial name
- Coenaculum tertium Dell, 1952

Species of gastropod

Coenaculum tertium is a species of sea snail, a marine gastropod mollusc in the family Cimidae. The species is one of four known species to exist within the genus, Coenaculum, the other species are Coenaculum minutulum, Coenaculum secundum and Coenaculum weerdtae.
