= Euspira notabilis =

Scientific classification
- Kingdom: Animalia
- Phylum: Mollusca
- Class: Gastropoda
- Subclass: Caenogastropoda
- Order: Littorinimorpha
- Family: Naticidae
- Genus: Euspira
- Species: E. notabilis

Binomial name
- Euspira notabilis Jeffreys, 1885

Species of gastropod

Euspira notabilis is a species of predatory sea snail, a marine gastropod mollusc in the family Naticidae, the moon snails.
