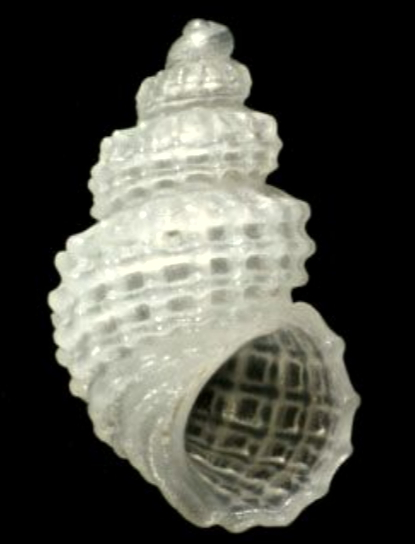
- Apertural view of Alvania fischeri (specimen at the Natural History Museum, Rotterdam)

Scientific classification
- Kingdom: Animalia
- Phylum: Mollusca
- Class: Gastropoda
- Subclass: Caenogastropoda
- Order: Littorinimorpha
- Superfamily: Rissooidea
- Family: Rissoidae
- Genus: Alvania
- Species: A. fischeri

Binomial name
- Alvania fischeri (Jeffreys, 1884)

Synonyms
- Alvania (Alvania) fischeri (Jeffreys, 1884); Rissoa fischeri Jeffreys, 1884

= Alvania fischeri =

Species of gastropod

Alvania fischeri is a species of small sea snail, a marine gastropod mollusk or micromollusk in the family Rissoidae.

== Description ==
The length of the shell varies between 2 mm and 3 mm.

(Original description) The oval shell is rather solid, opaque and lustreless. The colour of the shell is pale yellowish or dirty white.

The sculpture consists of 16-18 strong longitudinal ribs on the body whorl, 14-16 on the penultimate whorl, 10-12 on the next, and merely traces or none at all on the second whorl, the top whorl or apex being smooth. These ribs are crossed by equally strong spiral ribs or ridges, of which there are 6-8 on the body whorl, 4 on the penultimate, and 3 on the next whorl, the succeeding or second whorl being marked with a few spiral striae. The points of intersection are noduled or prickly, but only as to the four upper spiral ridges on the body whorl in consequence of the longitudinal ribs not extending to the lower or basal spiral ridges. The interstices are oblong.

The spire is somewhat tapering. It contains 5 whorls, moderately convex, rapidly increasing in size, the last occupying half the spire. The apex is prominent but twisted. The suture is deep and angulated. The aperture is nearly round. The outer lip is thin and smooth inside. The inner lip is reflected on the columella, which is not umbilicated nor perforated.

== Distribution ==
This species occurs in the Western Mediterranean Sea, off Tunisia and Andalusia, Spain.
