= Mangelia scabra =

Scientific classification
- Kingdom: Animalia
- Phylum: Mollusca
- Class: Gastropoda
- Subclass: Caenogastropoda
- Order: Neogastropoda
- Superfamily: Conoidea
- Family: Mangeliidae
- Genus: Mangelia
- Species: M. scabra

Binomial name
- Mangelia scabra (J.G. Jeffreys, 1847)

Synonyms
- Pleurotoma scabrum J.G. Jeffreys, 1847

Species of gastropod

Mangelia scabra is a species of sea snail, a marine gastropod mollusk in the family Mangeliidae.

This is a provisory name and is in need of reassessment.

== Description ==
(Original description) The oblong shell is yellowish white. It contains six or seven whorls, tapering and rounded. Each whorl is marked with twelve rather oblique, longitudinal ribs. These are crossed by about the same number of raised transverse striae which produce tubercles at the point of junction and are of purplish brown colour. The suture is rather deep and well-defined, showing the gradual formation and prolongation of the slit. The aperture is oblong. The siphonal canal is short. There is no umbilicus. The transverse striae give the shell a scabrous appearance.

== Distribution ==
This marine species occurs off Scotland, UK.
