= Graphis =

Graphis may refer to:

- Graphis (lichen), a genus in the family Graphidaceae
- Graphis (gastropod), a genus of sea snails in the family Cimidae
- Graphis Inc., an international publishing company
