= Batheulima abbreviata =

Scientific classification
- Kingdom: Animalia
- Phylum: Mollusca
- Class: Gastropoda
- Subclass: Caenogastropoda
- Order: Littorinimorpha
- Family: Eulimidae
- Genus: Batheulima
- Species: B. abbreviata

Binomial name
- Batheulima abbreviata (Jeffreys, 1884)

Synonyms
- Eulima abbreviata Jeffreys, 1884

Species of gastropod

Batheulima abbreviata is a species of sea snail, a marine gastropod mollusc in the genus Batheulima, a minor genus within the family Eulimidae.

== Distribution ==
This marine species is found within European waters (ERMS scope), mainly the Mediterranean Sea.
