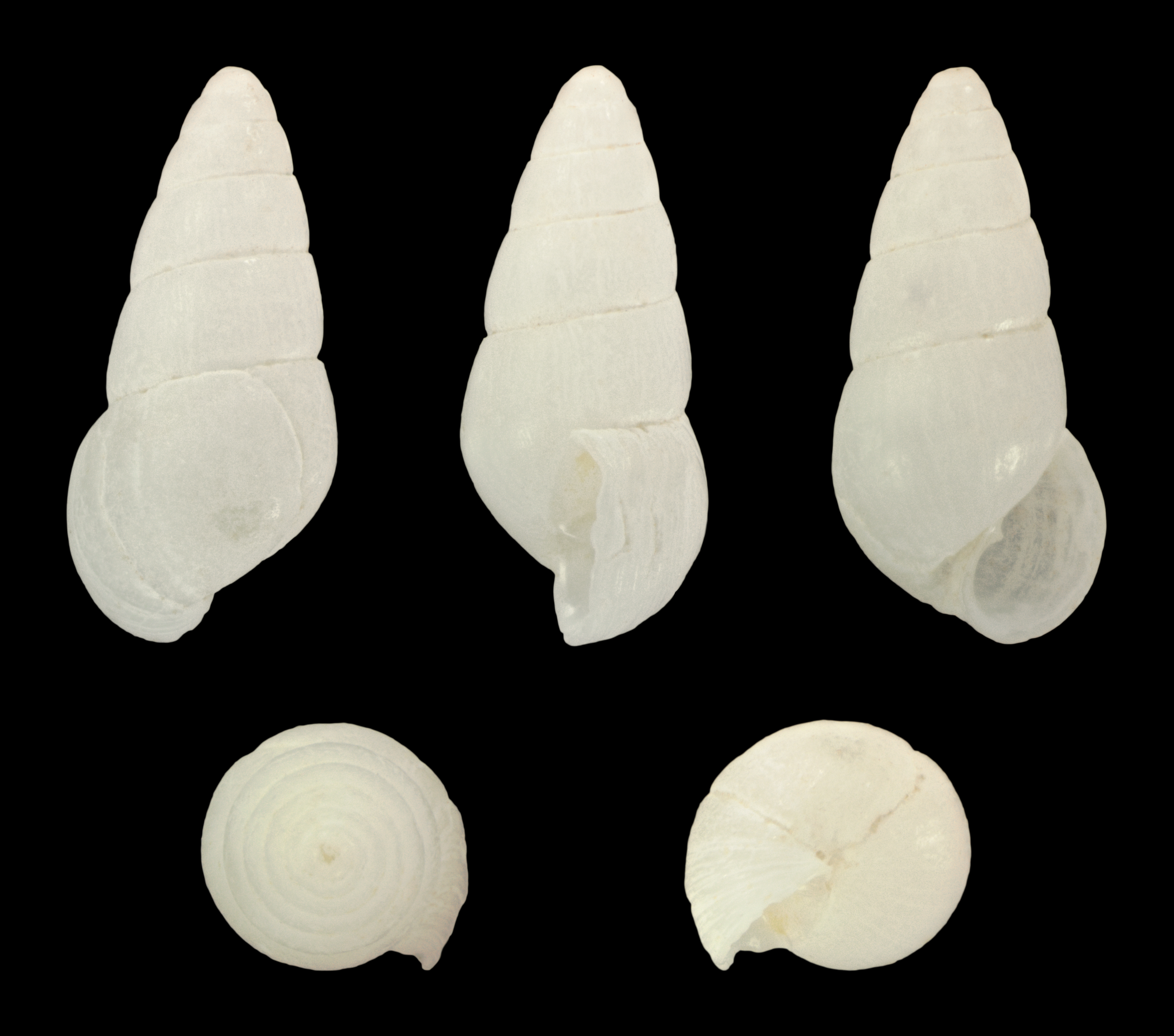

Scientific classification
- Kingdom: Animalia
- Phylum: Mollusca
- Class: Gastropoda
- Family: Pyramidellidae
- Genus: Odostomia
- Species: O. acuta

Binomial name
- Odostomia acuta Jeffreys, 1848

= Odostomia acuta =

Species of gastropod

Odostomia acuta is a species of sea snail, a marine gastropod mollusc in the family Pyramidellidae, the pyrams and their allies.

== Description ==
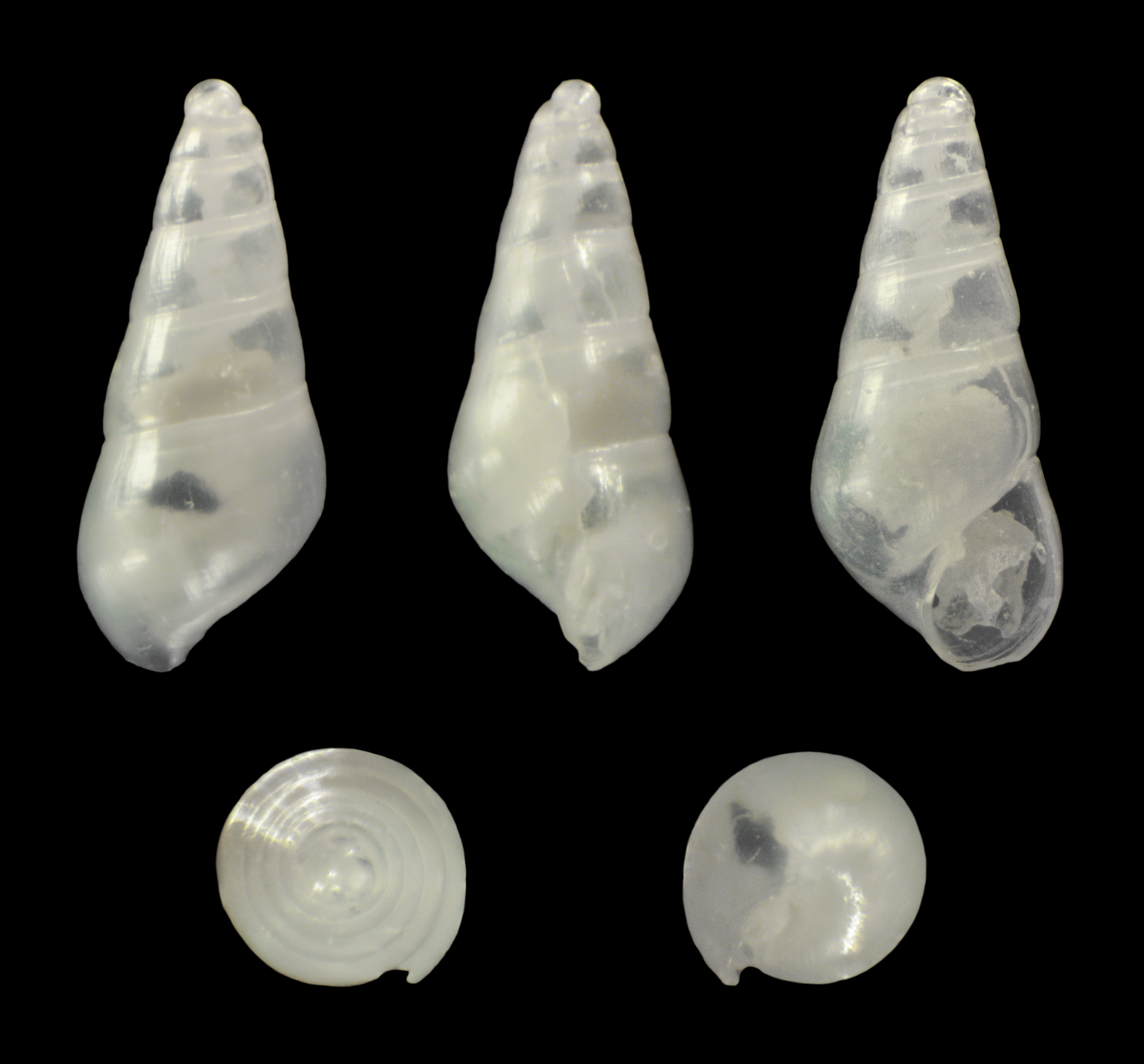
Odostomia acuta var. attenuata

The shell is rather solid, but semitransparent and lustrous, with microscopic close spiral striae, and still more minute, flexuous, crowded growth lines. The shell is whitish with a tinge of flesh-color. There are six whorls besides the embryonic ones. The periphery is obtusely keeled. The umbilicus is conspicuous but small. The tooth is strong and prominent. The outer lip is occasionally striate within.

== Distribution ==
This species occurs in the following locations:

- Angola
- Atlantic Europe
- Azores Exclusive Economic Zone
- Belgian Exclusive Economic Zone
- European waters (ERMS scope)
- Greek Exclusive Economic Zone
- Irish Exclusive economic Zone
- Mediterranean Sea
- Morocco
- Portuguese Exclusive Economic Zone
- Spanish Exclusive Economic Zone
- United Kingdom Exclusive Economic Zone
- Wimereux
