= Euspira fringilla =

Scientific classification
- Kingdom: Animalia
- Phylum: Mollusca
- Class: Gastropoda
- Subclass: Caenogastropoda
- Order: Littorinimorpha
- Family: Naticidae
- Genus: Euspira
- Species: E. fringilla

Binomial name
- Euspira fringilla (Dall, 1881)

Synonyms
- Lunatia fringilla (Dall, 1881); Natica fringilla Dall, 1881 (basionym); Natica fringilla var. perla Dall, 1889; Polinices fringillus (Dall, 1881)

Species of gastropod

Euspira fringilla is a species of predatory sea snail, a marine gastropod mollusc in the family Naticidae, the moon snails.

== Distribution ==
This species occurs in the Gulf of Mexico.

== Description ==
The maximum recorded shell length is 7 mm.

== Habitat ==
Minimum recorded depth is 538 m. Maximum recorded depth is 1536 m.
