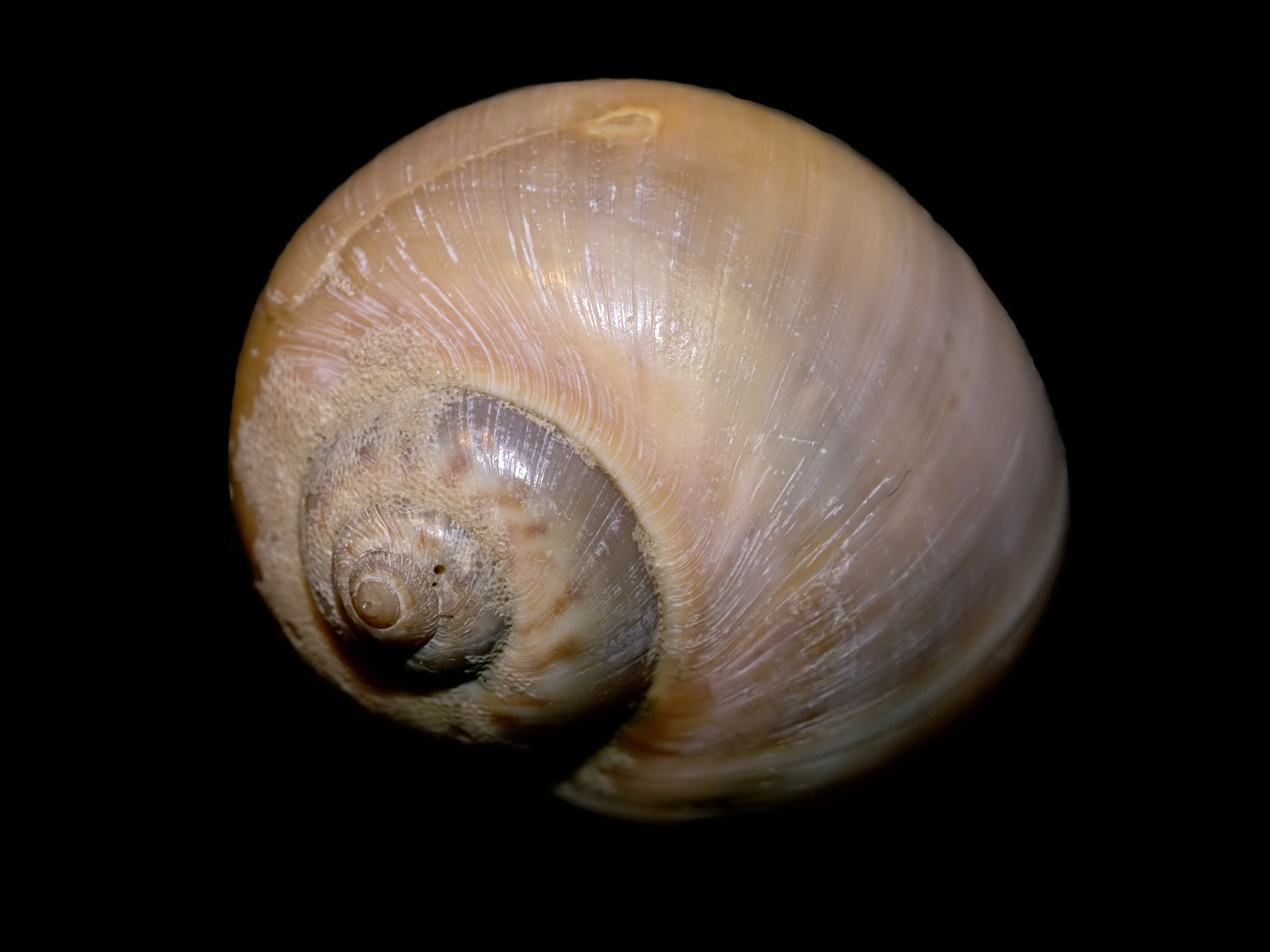
- Euspira catena

Scientific classification
- Kingdom: Animalia
- Phylum: Mollusca
- Class: Gastropoda
- Subclass: Caenogastropoda
- Order: Littorinimorpha
- Superfamily: Naticoidea
- Family: Naticidae
- Genus: Euspira; Agassiz, 1838

Synonyms
- † Labellinacca Cossmann, 1919; Lunatia Gray, 1847; Mamma (Lunatia) Gray, 1847 junior subjective synonym; Natica (Euspira) Agassiz, 1837; Natica (Lunatia) Gray, 1847; Polinices (Euspira) Agassiz, 1838; Polinices (Lunatia) Gray, 1847; Uber (Euspira) Agassiz, 1837

= Euspira =

Euspira Temporal range: Triassic - Recent

Genus of gastropods

Euspira is a genus of medium-sized sea snails, marine gastropod molluscs in the subfamily Polinicinae of the family Naticidae, the moon snails.

== Fossil reports ==
This genus is known from the fossil records from the Triassic to the Quaternary (age range: from 242.0 to 0.0 million years ago). Fossils are found in marine strata throughout the world. There are about 25 extinct species.

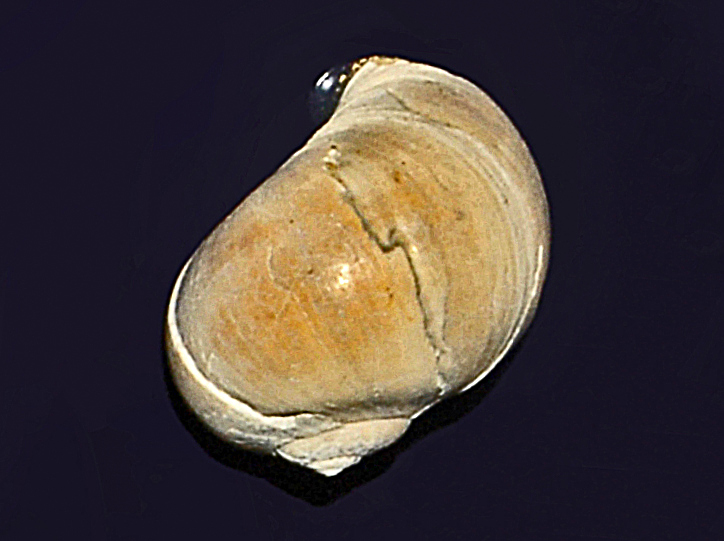
Fossil shell of Euspira catena from Pliocene of Italy

== Species ==
Species within the genus Euspira include:

- Euspira abyssicola (E. A. Smith, 1896)
- Euspira agujana (Dall, W.H., 1908)
- Euspira blaizensis (Kilburn, 1976)
- Euspira borshengjungi K.-Y. Lai, 2017
- Euspira catena (Costa, E.M. da, 1778)
- Euspira crawfordiana (Dall, 1908)
- † Euspira elegans (Suter, 1917)
- † Euspira eyrensis Finlay, 1927
- Euspira fringilla (Dall, 1881)
- Euspira fusca (Blainville, H.M.D. de, 1825)
- † Euspira fyfei (Marwick, 1924)
- Euspira gilva (Philippi, 1851)
- † Euspira glaucinoides (J. Sowerby, 1812)
- Euspira grossularia (Marche-Marchad, I., 1957)
- Euspira guilleminii (Payraudeau, 1826)
- † Euspira helicina (Brocchi, 1814)
- Euspira heros (Say, T., 1822)
- † Euspira ilhagwilensis Pacaud, 2016
- Euspira intricata (Donovan, 1804)
- † Euspira lateaperta (Marwick, 1924)
- Euspira lemaitrei (Kilburn, 1976)
- Euspira levicula (A. E. Verrill, 1880)
- Euspira levis (E. A. Smith, 1896)
- Euspira litorina (Dall, 1908)
- Euspira macilenta (Philippi, 1844)
- Euspira massieri Petuch & Berschauer, 2018
- Euspira montagui (Forbes, E., 1838)
- Euspira monterona Dall, 1919
- Euspira napus (Smith, E.A., 1904)
- Euspira nitida (Donovan, E., 1804)
- Euspira notabilis Jeffreys, 1885
- Euspira nubila (Dall, 1889)
- Euspira nux (Okutani, 1964)
- Euspira obtusa (Jeffreys, 1885)
- Euspira pallida (Broderip, W.J. & G.B. I Sowerby, 1829)
- Euspira pardoana (Dall, 1908)
- Euspira phaeocephala (Dautzenberg & Fischer H., 1896)
- Euspira pila (Pilsbry, H.A., 1911)
- Euspira plicispira (Kuroda, T., 1961)
- Euspira presubplicata (Bouchet & Warén, 1993)
- Euspira sagamiensis Kuroda & Habe, 1971
- Euspira strebeli (Dall, 1908)
- Euspira subplicata (Jeffreys, 1885)
- Euspira talismani Bouchet & Warén, 1993
- Euspira tenuis (Récluz, 1851)
- Euspira tenuistriata (Dautzenberg, Ph. & H. Fischer, 1911)
- Euspira triseriata (Say, T., 1826)
- † Euspira varians (Dujardin, 1837)
- Euspira yokoyamai (Kuroda & Habe, 1952)

Species brought into synonymy

- Euspira acosmita Dall, 1919: synonym of Cryptonatica affinis (Gmelin, 1791)
- Euspira bahamensis Dall, 1925: synonym of Sigatica semisulcata (Gray, 1839)
- Euspira canonica Dall, 1919: synonym of Euspira pallida (Broderip & G.B. Sowerby I, 1829)
- Euspira draconis (Dall, 1903): synonym of Glossaulax draconis (Dall, 1903)
- Euspira falklandica (Preston, 1913): synonym of Falsilunatia falklandica (Preston, 1913)
- Euspira fortunei (Reeve, 1855): synonym of Laguncula pulchella Benson, 1842
- Euspira immaculata (Totten, 1835): synonym of Polinices immaculatus (Totten, 1835)
- Euspira lewisii (Gould, 1847): synonym of Lunatia lewisii (Gould, 1847)
- Euspira nana (Møller, 1842): synonym of Pseudopolinices nanus (Møller, 1842)
- Euspira patagonica (Philippi, 1845): synonym of Falsilunatia patagonica (Philippi, 1845)
- Euspira poliana (delle Chiaje, 1830): synonym of Euspira pulchella (Risso, 1826)
- Euspira politiana Dall, 1919: synonym of Lunatia pallida (Broderip & G.B. Sowerby I, 1829)
- Euspira pulchella (Risso, 1826): synonym of Euspira nitida (Donovan, 1804)
- Euspira rouxi (Nicklès, 1952): synonym of Natica rouxi Nicklès, 1952
- Euspira sandwichensis (Dall, 1895): synonym of Natica sandwichensis (Dall, 1895)
- Euspira venusta Suter, 1907: synonym of Globisinum venustum (Suter, 1907)
