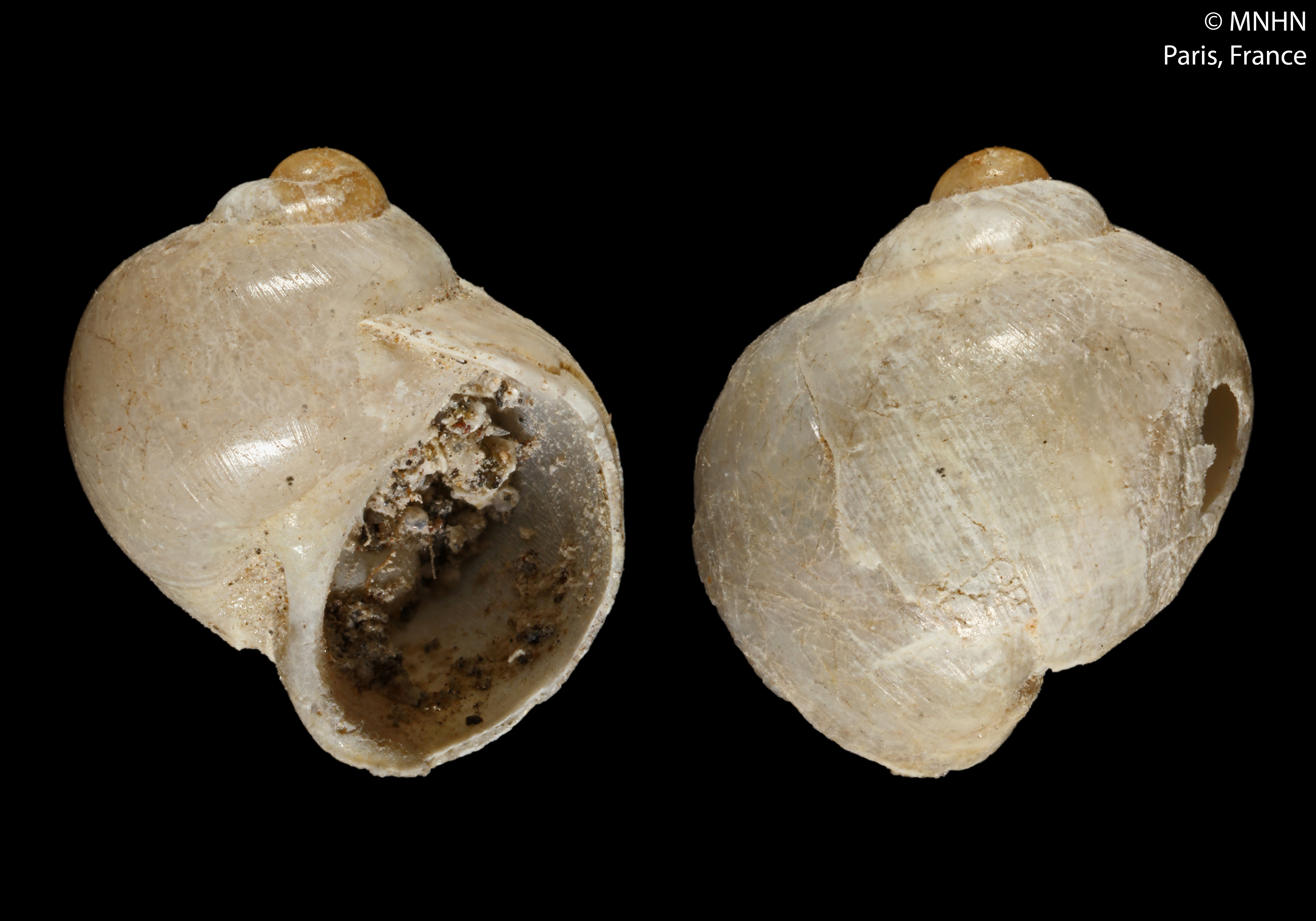
- Shell of Euspira phaeocephala (syntype at MNHN, Paris)

Scientific classification
- Kingdom: Animalia
- Phylum: Mollusca
- Class: Gastropoda
- Subclass: Caenogastropoda
- Order: Littorinimorpha
- Family: Naticidae
- Genus: Euspira
- Species: E. phaeocephala

Binomial name
- Euspira phaeocephala (Dautzenberg & Fischer H., 1896)

Synonyms
- Natica phaeocephala Dautzenberg & Fischer H., 1896

= Euspira phaeocephala =

Species of gastropod

Euspira phaeocephala is a species of predatory sea snail, a marine gastropod mollusc in the family Naticidae, the moon snails.

== Distribution ==
This species occurs in the Atlantic Ocean off the Azores.
