= Batheulima epixantha =

Scientific classification
- Kingdom: Animalia
- Phylum: Mollusca
- Class: Gastropoda
- Subclass: Caenogastropoda
- Order: Littorinimorpha
- Family: Eulimidae
- Genus: Batheulima
- Species: B. epixantha

Binomial name
- Batheulima epixantha Simone, 2002

Species of gastropod

Batheulima epixantha is a species of sea snail, a marine gastropod mollusc in the family Eulimidae.

== Distribution ==
This marine species is mainly known to occur off the coasts of Brazil, within the southern Atlantic Ocean.

== Description ==
The maximum recorded shell length is 6.6 mm.

== Habitat ==
Minimum recorded depth is 129 m. Maximum recorded depth is 133 m.
