= Eulimacrostoma patulum =

Scientific classification
- Kingdom: Animalia
- Phylum: Mollusca
- Class: Gastropoda
- Subclass: Caenogastropoda
- Order: Littorinimorpha
- Family: Eulimidae
- Genus: Eulimacrostoma
- Species: E. patulum

Binomial name
- Eulimacrostoma patulum (Dall & Simpson, 1901)

Synonyms
- Eulima (Leiostraca) patula Dall & Simpson, 1901 (basionym)

Species of gastropod

Eulima patula (known commonly as the Largemouth Eulima) a species of sea snail, a marine gastropod mollusk in the family Eulimidae. The species was previously one of a number within the genus Eulima.

== Distribution ==
This species occurs in the following locations:

- Caribbean Sea
- Cuba
- Gulf of Mexico
- Puerto Rico
- United Kingdom Exclusive Economic Zone

== Description ==
The maximum recorded shell length is 6 mm.

== Habitat ==
Minimum recorded depth is 4 m. Maximum recorded depth is 805 m.
