= Bouryiscala =

Scientific classification
- Kingdom: Animalia
- Phylum: Mollusca
- Class: Gastropoda
- Family: Cimidae
- Genus: Bouryiscala; Cossmann, 1902
- Species: B. turrisphari

Binomial name
- Bouryiscala turrisphari (Hedley, 1905)

Synonyms
- Dissopalia Iredale, 1936; Graphis (Bouryiscala) Cossmann, 1902

Genus of gastropods

Bouryiscala is a monotypic genus of medium-sized sea snails, marine gastropod molluscs in the family Cimidae. The only species is Bouryiscala turrisphari.
