= Euspira levicula =

Scientific classification
- Kingdom: Animalia
- Phylum: Mollusca
- Class: Gastropoda
- Subclass: Caenogastropoda
- Order: Littorinimorpha
- Family: Naticidae
- Genus: Euspira
- Species: E. levicula

Binomial name
- Euspira levicula (A. E. Verrill, 1880)

Synonyms
- Lunatia levicula (A. E. Verrill, 1880); Natica levicula A. E. Verrill, 1880 (basionym)

Species of gastropod

Euspira levicula is a species of predatory sea snail, a marine gastropod mollusc in the family Naticidae, the moon snails.

== Distribution ==
This species occurs in the Northwest Atlantic Ocean.

== Description ==
The maximum recorded shell length is 32 mm.

== Habitat ==
Minimum recorded depth is 50 m. Maximum recorded depth is 183 m.
