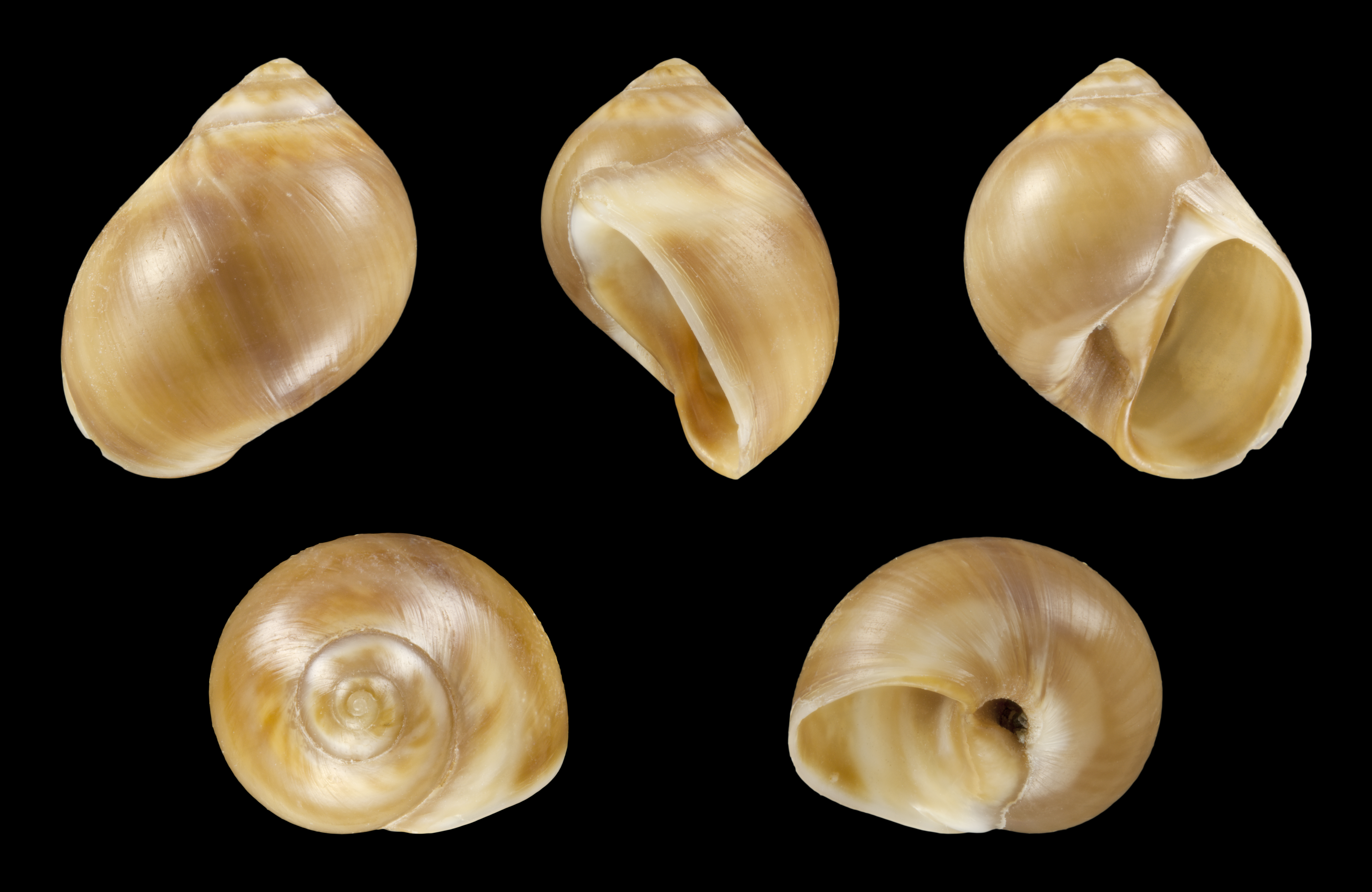

Scientific classification
- Kingdom: Animalia
- Phylum: Mollusca
- Class: Gastropoda
- Subclass: Caenogastropoda
- Order: Littorinimorpha
- Family: Naticidae
- Genus: Euspira
- Species: E. macilenta

Binomial name
- Euspira macilenta (Philippi, 1844)

Synonyms
- Lunatia macilenta (Philippi, 1844); Natica macilenta Philippi, 1844 (basionym); Polinices macilenta (Philippi, 1844)

= Euspira macilenta =

Species of gastropod

Euspira macilenta is a species of predatory sea snail, a marine gastropod mollusc in the family Naticidae, the moon snails.

== Distribution ==
This species occurs in the Mediterranean Sea.
