= Euspira grossularia =

Scientific classification
- Kingdom: Animalia
- Phylum: Mollusca
- Class: Gastropoda
- Subclass: Caenogastropoda
- Order: Littorinimorpha
- Family: Naticidae
- Genus: Euspira
- Species: E. grossularia

Binomial name
- Euspira grossularia (Marche-Marchad, 1957)

Synonyms
- Lunatia grossularia (Marche-Marchad, 1957); Polinices grossularia Marche-Marchad, 1957 (original combination); Polynices grossularia Marche-Marchad

Species of gastropod

Euspira grossularia, the Senegal moon snail, is a species of predatory sea snail, a marine gastropod mollusk in the family Naticidae, the moon snails.

== Distribution ==
This species is distributed in Mediterranean waters (Spain, Portugal); in the Atlantic Ocean off Angola.
