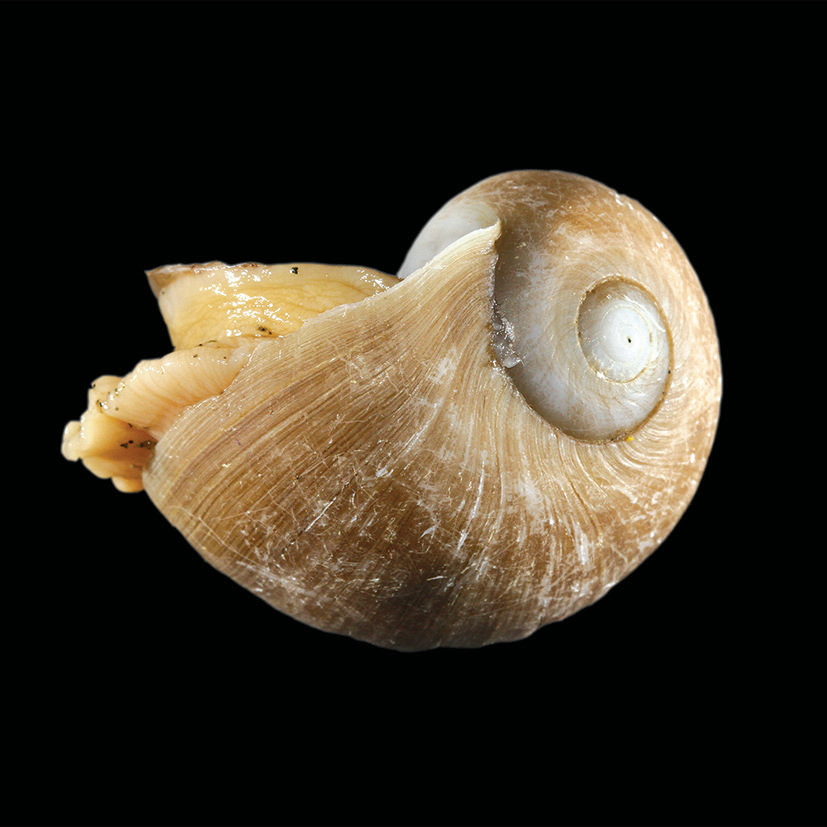
- Shell of Euspira napus

Scientific classification
- Kingdom: Animalia
- Phylum: Mollusca
- Class: Gastropoda
- Subclass: Caenogastropoda
- Order: Littorinimorpha
- Family: Naticidae
- Genus: Euspira
- Species: E. napus

Binomial name
- Euspira napus (E. A. Smith, 1904)

Synonyms
- Natica napus E. A. Smith, 1904 (original combination); Polinices (Euspira) napus (E. A. Smith, 1904); Polinices napus (E. A. Smith, 1904)

= Euspira napus =

Species of gastropod

Euspira napus is a species of predatory sea snail, a marine gastropod mollusk in the family Naticidae, the moon snails.

== Description ==
The diameter of the shell varies between 30 mm and 40 mm.

The shell is rounded, solid, and smooth, with a low spire. Its aperture is semi-circular, bordered by a thin outer lip, while the base features a distinct yet narrow umbilicus and a slightly thickened edge on the inner lip. The surface sculpture consists of fine, closely set growth lines. The living animal has a horny operculum.

The shell is white, with a dull brown periostracum (a thin, skin-like outer covering), typically displaying a pattern of fine spiral lines.

== Distribution ==
This species is endemic to South Africa and occurs off Port Alfred and the Agulhas Bank (False Bay to western Transkei) at depths between 50 m and 210 m.
