= Batheulima thurstoni =

Scientific classification
- Kingdom: Animalia
- Phylum: Mollusca
- Class: Gastropoda
- Subclass: Caenogastropoda
- Order: Littorinimorpha
- Family: Eulimidae
- Genus: Batheulima
- Species: B. thurstoni

Binomial name
- Batheulima thurstoni Bouchet & Warén, 1986

Species of gastropod

Batheulima thurstoni is a species of sea snail, a marine gastropod mollusc in the family Eulimidae.
