= Euspira pallida =

Scientific classification
- Kingdom: Animalia
- Phylum: Mollusca
- Class: Gastropoda
- Subclass: Caenogastropoda
- Order: Littorinimorpha
- Family: Naticidae
- Genus: Euspira
- Species: E. pallida

Binomial name
- Euspira pallida (Broderip & Sowerby, 1829)

Synonyms
- Euspira canonica Dall, 1919; Euspira politiana Dall, 1919; Lunatia choshiensis Tiba, 1985; Lunatia pallida (Broderip & G. B. Sowerby I, 1829); Natica borealis Gray, 1839; Natica caurina Gould, 1847; Natica gouldii Philippi, 1845; Natica groenlandica Möller, 1842; Natica pallida Broderip & G. B. Sowerby I, 1829 (original combination); Natica pusilla Gould, 1841; Neverita politiana (Dall, 1919); Polinices (Lunatia) pallida (Broderip & G. B. Sowerby I, 1829); Polinices groenlandica [sic] (incorrect gender ending); Polinices groenlandicus (Möller, 1842); Polinices pallidus (Broderip & Sowerby, 1829)

Species of gastropod

Euspira pallida is a species of predatory sea snail, a marine gastropod mollusc in the family Naticidae, the moon snails.

== Description ==
The maximum recorded shell length is 42 mm.

== Distribution ==
This marine species occurs in European waters, the North Sea, the North Atlantic Ocean (from the Arctic Sea to North Carolina) and the Beaufort Sea

== Habitat ==
Minimum recorded depth is 0 m. Maximum recorded depth is 2480 m.
