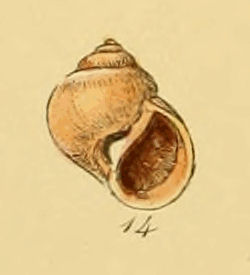

Scientific classification
- Kingdom: Animalia
- Phylum: Mollusca
- Class: Gastropoda
- Subclass: Caenogastropoda
- Order: Littorinimorpha
- Family: Naticidae
- Genus: Euspira
- Species: E. montagui

Binomial name
- Euspira montagui (Edward Forbes, 1838)

Synonyms
- Lunatia montagui (Forbes, 1838); Natica groenlandica Beck, 1847 (Invalid: junior homonym of Natica groenlandica Möller, 1842); Natica montacuti Jeffreys, 1867; Natica montacuti var. albula Jeffreys, 1867; Natica montacuti var. conica Jeffreys, 1867; Natica montagui Forbes, 1838 (basionym); Natica rutila MacGillivray, 1843; Natica squalida MacGillivray, 1843; Nerita rufa Montagu, 1808 (Invalid: junior homonym of Nerita rufa Born, 1778); Polinices (Lunatia) montagui (Forbes, 1838)

= Euspira montagui =

Species of gastropod

Euspira montagui is a species of predatory sea snail, a marine gastropod mollusc in the family Naticidae, the moon snails.

== Distribution ==
This species occurs in the Northeast Atlantic Ocean, European waters and the Mediterranean Sea.

Records of Euspira fusca, Euspira pallida and Euspira montagui are only known from older literature (de Malzine, 1867; Colbeau, 1868; Pelseneer, 1881; Maitland, 1897; Vonck, 1933). They are possibly completely or partly based on wrong identifications of fossil species that also occur at the Belgian coast.

== Bibliography ==
- Backeljau, T. (1986). Lijst van de recente mariene mollusken van België [List of the recent marine molluscs of Belgium]. Koninklijk Belgisch Instituut voor Natuurwetenschappen: Brussels, Belgium. 106 pp.
- Gofas, S.; Le Renard, J.; Bouchet, P. (2001). Mollusca, in: Costello, M.J. et al. (Ed.) (2001). European register of marine species: a check-list of the marine species in Europe and a bibliography of guides to their identification. Collection Patrimoines Naturels, 50: pp. 180–213
- Torigoe K. & Inaba A. (2011) Revision on the classification of Recent Naticidae. Bulletin of the Nishinomiya Shell Museum 7: 133 + 15 pp., 4 pls
