= Eulimacrostoma chascanon =

Scientific classification
- Kingdom: Animalia
- Phylum: Mollusca
- Class: Gastropoda
- Subclass: Caenogastropoda
- Order: Littorinimorpha
- Family: Eulimidae
- Genus: Eulimacrostoma
- Species: E. chascanon

Binomial name
- Eulimacrostoma chascanon (Watson, 1883)

Synonyms
- Eulima chascanon R. B. Watson, 1883 (original combination); Eulima chaskanon [sic]; Melanella chascanon (Watson, 1883)

Species of gastropod

Eulimacrostoma chascanon is a species of sea snail, a marine gastropod mollusk in the family Eulimidae. The species is one of a number within the genus Eulimacrostoma.

== Description ==
The maximum recorded shell length is 8.1 mm.

== Habitat ==
Minimum recorded depth is 713 m. Maximum recorded depth is 713 m.
