= Eulimacrostoma fusus =

Eulimacrostoma fuscus

Scientific classification
- Kingdom: Animalia
- Phylum: Mollusca
- Class: Gastropoda
- Subclass: Caenogastropoda
- Order: Littorinimorpha
- Family: Eulimidae
- Genus: Eulimacrostoma
- Species: E. fuscus

Binomial name
- Eulimacrostoma fuscus (Dall, 1889)

Synonyms
- Eulima (Leiostraca) fusus Dall, 1889 (basionym); Eulima fusus Dall, 1889 (original combination)

Species of gastropod

Eulimacrostoma fuscus is a species of sea snail, a marine gastropod mollusk in the family Eulimidae. The species was previously one of a number within the genus Eulima.

== Distribution ==
This species occurs in the following locations:

- Caribbean Sea
- Cuba
- Gulf of Mexico
- Mexico

== Description ==
The maximum recorded shell length is 13.3 mm.

== Habitat ==
Minimum recorded depth is 110 m. Maximum recorded depth is 1170 m.
