= George Barlee =

English lawyer and naturalist (1794–1861)

- Born: 1794
- Died: 19 November 1861 (aged 66–67); Exmouth, England
- Scientific career
- Fields: Conchology

George Barlee (né Buckle; 1794–1861) was a British lawyer and conchologist.

== Life ==
Barlee's original surname was Buckle. He was born in 1794, to the Reverend William Buckle (1759–1830) and his wife Anne (née Smith; died 1800) of Wrentham in Suffolk. Barlee's father William and uncle Charles changed the Buckle family name to Barlee in 1811 by Royal Sign Manual to benefit from a family inheritance, which included retrospectively applying the name change to their children.

Barlee's siblings who survived to adulthood were his older sister Anne (born 1791) who later married the Reverend Frederick Beatty of Dublin, and a younger brother, Thomas Dalling (born 1796), a Royal Navy Midshipman who was wounded in action on HMS Amelia on 7 February 1813, and later published a volume of poetry. Barlee's stepmother was Lucy Elizabeth Davy.

Barlee began his career as an attorney in the town of Yoxford, Suffolk, but sold off his law residence in 1835.

On 23 September 1821 Barlee married Charlotte Leman, daughter of Reverend Naunton Thomas Ogill Leman of Brampton. They had one son, Naunton Dalling Barlee (13 June 1829 – 7 November 1838), who died aged nine after a protracted illness.

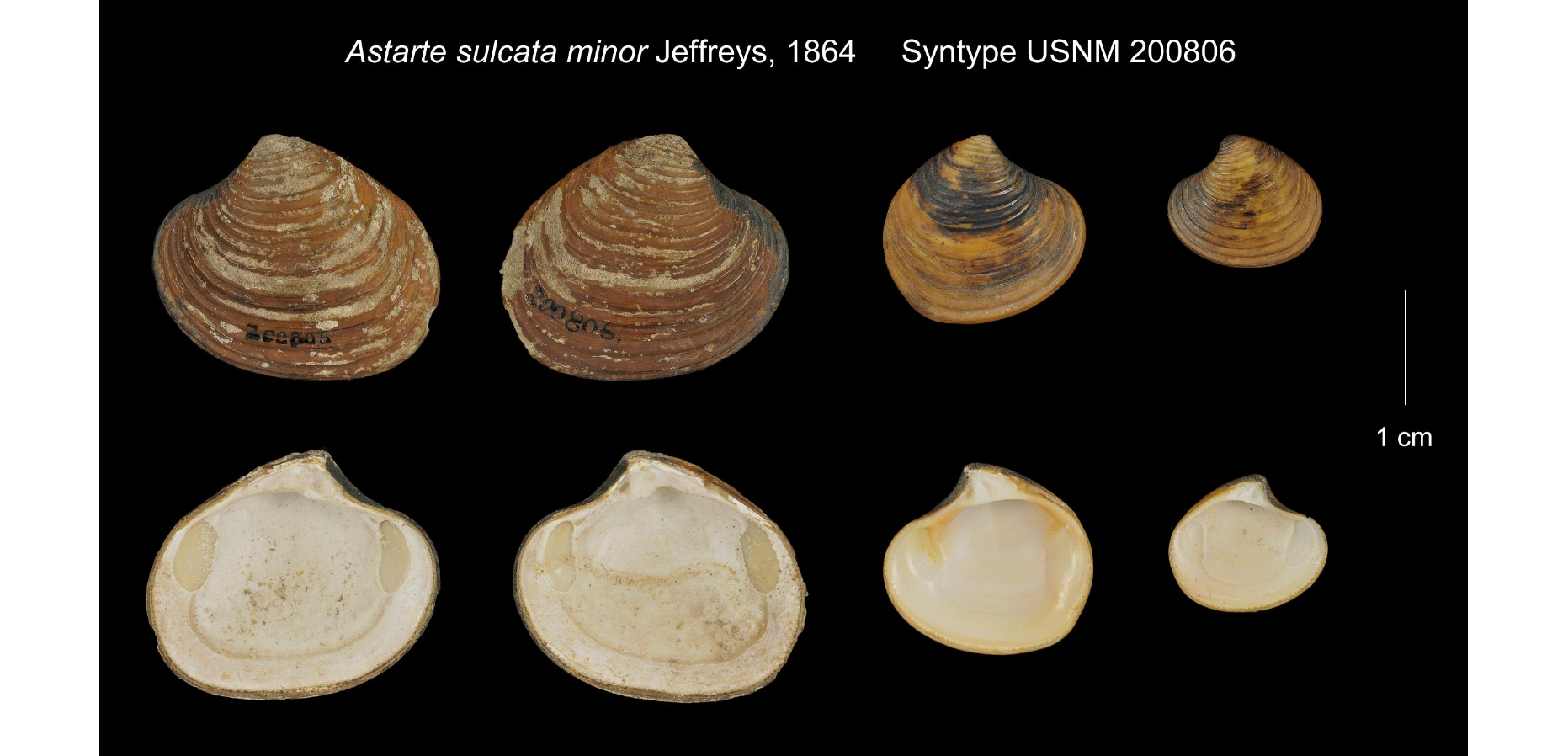
USNM 200806 Syntype specimens of bivalve shells of Astarte sulcata minor (Jeffreys, 1864) collected by George Barlee.

After the death of his son Barlee was disconsolate and in poor health. One day while walking on Paignton beach after a storm he noticed a mother and daughter collecting shells and asked if he could assist them, finding some solace in the activity. He befriended the women and later visited their house and shell collection. After this Barlee dedicated himself to the study of natural history, especially conchology. John Gwyn Jeffreys often accompanied Barlee on dredging expeditions. Barlee was sometimes struck with attacks of illness while out dredging, but he carried on working around them.

While Barlee seldom published upon his own discoveries, he shared his specimens with friends and colleagues, and so made notable contributions to the works of other naturalists. Barlee is credited as a friend and contributor in the work of John Gwyn Jeffreys, James Scott Bowerbank and Alfred Merle Norman.

Barlee died at Exmouth on 19 November 1861.

== Legacy ==
The Gastropod family Barleeiidae Gray, 1857 and the Genus Barleeia W. Clark, 1853 are named for Barlee, as well as the sponge species Clathria (Clathria) barleei (Bowerbank, 1866).

Specimens collected by Barlee are held in the collections of the Oxford University Museum of Natural History, The Natural History Museum, London, and The Smithsonian National Museum of Natural History in Washington.
