= George William Chaster =

George William Chaster MRCS, LRCP
- Born: 1863; Wigan, England
- Died: 1910 (aged 46–47)

George William Chaster (1863 – 5 May 1910) was an English medical doctor, entomologist, and conchologist.

== Life ==
George William Chaster was born in Wigan in 1863. He trained as a doctor at University College, Liverpool, winning the Lyon-Jones Scholarship in 1882 and was appointed the Holt Tutorial Fellow in 1889. He also won a number of medals during his training. He established his medical practice in Southport. He was one of the founding members of the Southport Natural Science Society and served as the editor of the Society's journal.

From a young age, Chaster was interested in the natural sciences, in particular conchology. He spent is holidays in Ireland, where he would dredge and collect specimens. Along with Irish naturalists, including Robert Welch, Chaster dredged around Rathlin Ireland in 1896 and 1897. He also took part in the Royal Irish Academy's Clare Island Survey. He was also interested in Foraminifera and Coleoptera, publishing numerous papers on a variety of topics. As well as collecting locally in Southport, he also collected in Nottinghamshire. In Ireland, he added a number of newly recorded species to lists. Chaster named the mollusc species, Arculus sykesii and Neolepton obliquatum, the genus Retrotortina with the monotypic species R. fuscata which is considered as Europe's smallest gastropod, and the genus Cima. The foraminifer species Rotalliella chasteri described by Edward Heron-Allen and Arthur Earland in 1913 under the genus Discorbina is named after him. He served as the vice-president of the Conchological Society of Great Britain & Ireland.

Chaster died on 5 May 1910 from pleuro-pneumonia. Amgueddfa Cymru – Museum Wales holds his collection of around 11,000 insects, and 2,890 lots of molluscs. Robert Lloyd Praeger stated that "Irish conchology especially owes much to his work" and that his premature death "was a severe loss to Irish zoology". Obituaries were published in the British Medical Journal and The Entomologist's Monthly Magazine.
