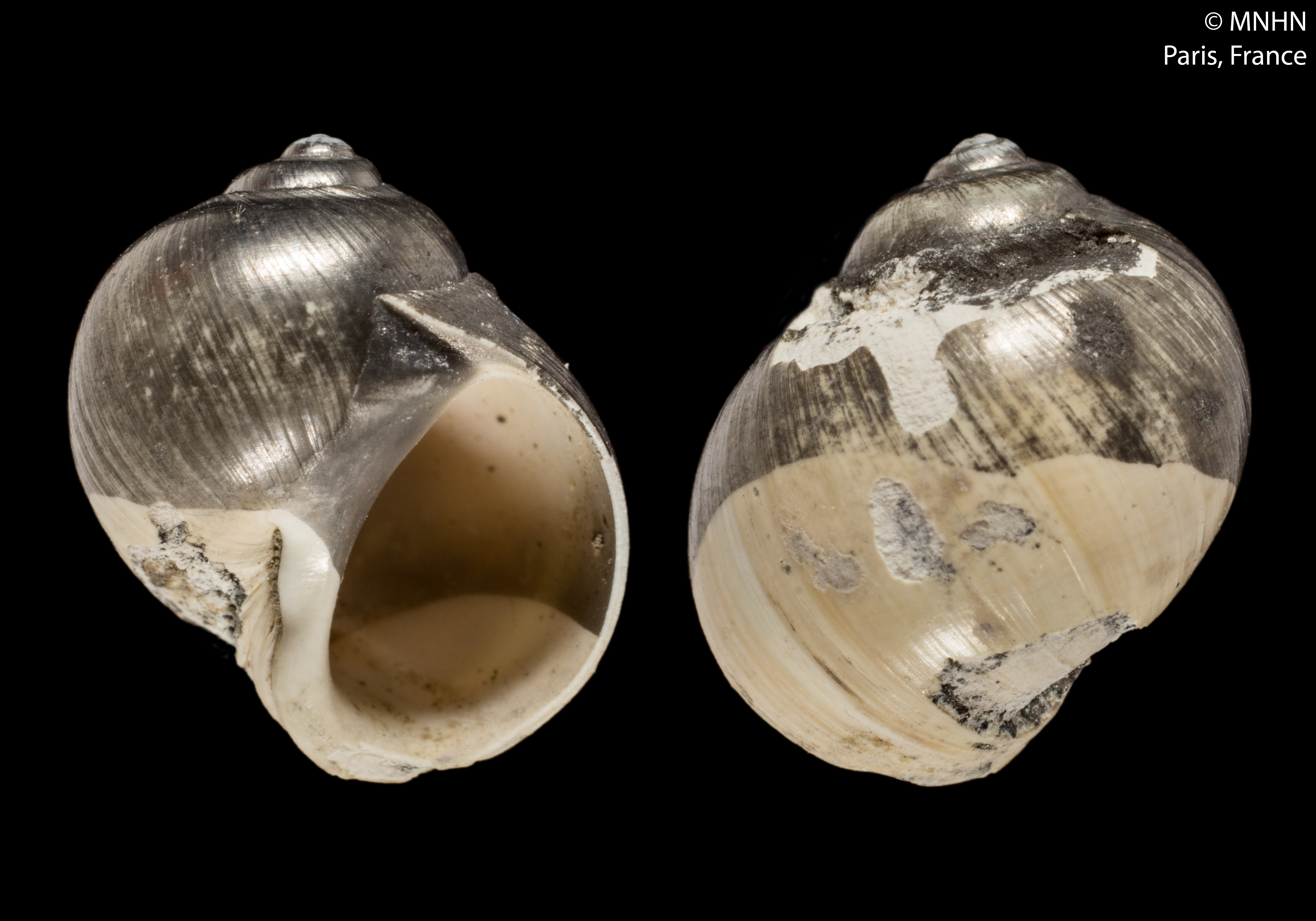
- Shell of Euspira presubplicata (holotype at MNHN, Paris)

Scientific classification
- Kingdom: Animalia
- Phylum: Mollusca
- Class: Gastropoda
- Subclass: Caenogastropoda
- Order: Littorinimorpha
- Family: Naticidae
- Genus: Euspira
- Species: E. presubplicata

Binomial name
- Euspira presubplicata (Bouchet & Warén, 1993)

Synonyms
- Polinices presubplicata Bouchet & Warén, 1993

= Euspira presubplicata =

Species of gastropod

Euspira presubplicata is a species of predatory sea snail, a marine gastropod mollusc in the family Naticidae, the moon snails.

== Description ==
The length of the shell attains 14.9 mm.

== Distribution ==
This marine species occurs off Portugal.
