= Euspira triseriata =

Scientific classification
- Kingdom: Animalia
- Phylum: Mollusca
- Class: Gastropoda
- Subclass: Caenogastropoda
- Order: Littorinimorpha
- Family: Naticidae
- Genus: Euspira
- Species: E. triseriata

Binomial name
- Euspira triseriata (Say, 1826)

Synonyms
- Lunatia triseriata (Say, 1826); Natica triseriata Say, 1826 (basionym); Polinices triseriata (Say, 1826)

Species of gastropod

Euspira triseriata, the spotted moonsnail, is a species of predatory sea snail, a marine gastropod mollusc in the family Naticidae, the moon snails.

== Distribution ==
This species occurs in the Northwest Atlantic Ocean.

== Description ==
The maximum recorded shell length is 33 mm.

== Habitat ==
Minimum recorded depth is 0 m. Maximum recorded depth is 274 m.
