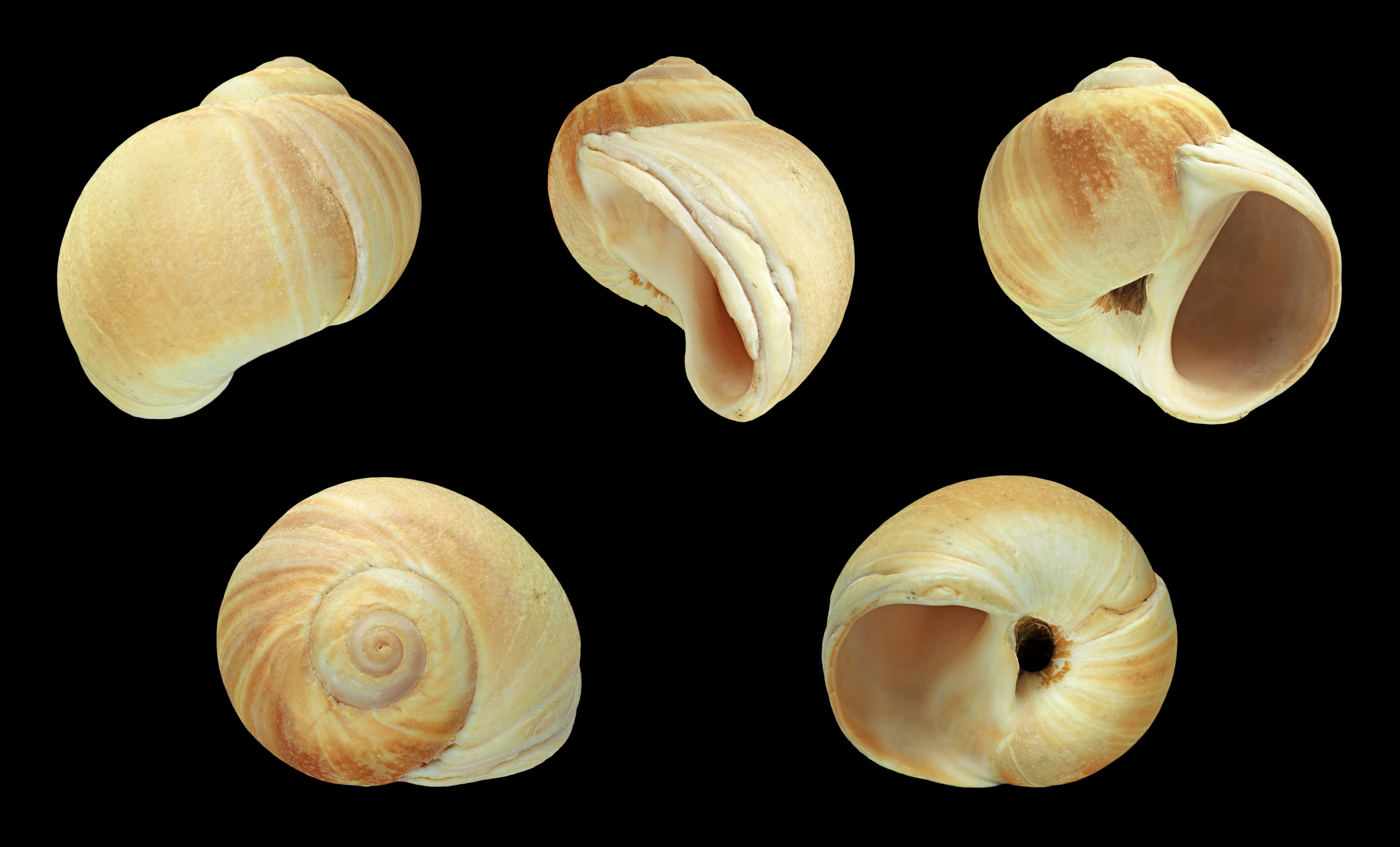

Scientific classification
- Kingdom: Animalia
- Phylum: Mollusca
- Class: Gastropoda
- Subclass: Caenogastropoda
- Order: Littorinimorpha
- Family: Naticidae
- Genus: Euspira
- Species: E. fusca

Binomial name
- Euspira fusca (de Blainville, 1825) ref> Blainville H.M.D. de (1825). Natice, Natica, pp. 247-255, in: Dictionnaire des Sciences Naturelles (F. Cuvier, ed.), vol. 34. Levrault, Strasbourg & Paris, & Le Normant, Paris.

Synonyms
- Lunatia fusca (Blainville, 1825); Lunatia sordida (Philippi, 1836); Natica angulata Jeffreys, 1885; Natica brocchiana Philippi, 1851; Natica compacta Jeffreys, 1885; Natica fusca Blainville, 1825 (original combination); Natica plicatula Reeve, 1855; Natica sordida Philippi, 1844 (invalid: junior homonym of Natica sordida Swainson, 1821); Polinices (Lunatia) fusca (Blainville, 1825); Polinices (Lunatia) sordida (Blainville, 1825); Polinices fuscus (Blainville, 1825)

= Euspira fusca =

Species of gastropod

Euspira fusca, common name the dark necklace shell, is a species of predatory sea snail, a marine gastropod mollusc in the family Naticidae, the moon snails.

== Distribution ==
This species occurs in the Northeast Atlantic Ocean, European waters and the Mediterranean Sea.
