= Eulimacrostoma =

Scientific classification
- Kingdom: Animalia
- Phylum: Mollusca
- Class: Gastropoda
- Subclass: Caenogastropoda
- Order: Littorinimorpha
- Family: Eulimidae
- Genus: Eulimacrostoma; Souza & Pimenta, 2019

Type species
- Eulimacrostoma microsculpturatum Souza & Pimenta, 2019

Genus of gastropods

Eulimacrostoma is a genus of medium-sized sea snails, marine gastropod mollusks in the family Eulimidae.

== Species ==
- Eulimacrostoma chascanon (R. B. Watson, 1883)
- Eulimacrostoma fusus (Dall, 1889)
- Eulimacrostoma lutescens (Simone, 2002)
- Eulimacrostoma microsculpturatum Souza & Pimenta, 2019
- Eulimacrostoma patulum (Dall & Simpson, 1901)

Species brought into synonymy

- Eulimacrostoma microsculpturata Souza & Pimenta, 2019: synonym of Eulimacrostoma microsculpturatum Souza & Pimenta, 2019 (wrong gender agreement of specific epithet)
