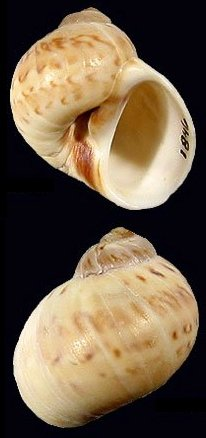
- Apertural and abapertural view of the shell of Euspira nitida.

Scientific classification
- Kingdom: Animalia
- Phylum: Mollusca
- Class: Gastropoda
- Subclass: Caenogastropoda
- Order: Littorinimorpha
- Family: Naticidae
- Genus: Euspira
- Species: E. nitida

Binomial name
- Euspira nitida (Donovan, 1804)

Synonyms
- See list

= Euspira nitida =

Species of gastropod

Euspira nitida, the common necklace shell, is a species of sea snail, a marine gastropod mollusc in the family Naticidae, the moon snails.

== Distribution ==
The common necklace shell is a common sea snail occurring in the sublittoral zone and deeper waters (exceptionally up to 2,000 m) along sandy coasts of the North Sea, from France to Norway, and the North East Atlantic (Iceland). It is also common in the Mediterranean Sea. It can be frequently found in great numbers washed ashore on beaches. It has been present in the North Sea since the Pliocene.

== Description of the shell ==
The globular shell is rather small with a low spire : max. 16 mm high and 14 mm wide. The shell has a rather pointed apex. There are 5 to 6 gently convex whorls with an shallow suture. The body whorl is strongly rounded and covers almost the whole shell. The aperture is rather ovate and has a smooth outer lip. A siphonal canal is lacking. The umbilicus is partly covered with a callus. The horny operculum is composed of corneous material. The surface of the shell is smooth and shiny and lacks sculpture. Its color is a pale brown-yellow stained with orange to red-brown spots, arranged in four to five spiral lines. The shell of washed up specimens shows often a blue-black discoloration.

== Taxonomy ==
Euspira nitida (Donovan, 1804) is the earliest available name for the common, shallow water, small-sized Euspira species that, in the Atlantic, has been called alderi, and in the Mediterranean has been called pulchella. Donovan's name was based on albino specimens of this species, which is why the name nitida has in the past been wrongly rejected by some authors as that of an "exotic" or "tropical" species.

There are many synonyms for this species

- Euspira poliana (Delle Chiaje, 1826)
- Euspira pulchella (Risso, 1826)
- Lunatia alderi (Forbes, 1838)
- Lunatia intermedia (Philippi, 1836)
- Lunatia poliana (Della Chiaje, 1826)
- Lunatia pulchella (Risso, 1826)
- Lunatica nitida (Donovan, 1804)
- Natica alderi Forbes, 1838
- Natica alderi var. elata Bucquoy, Dautzenberg & Dollfus, 1883
- Natica alderi var. globulosa Bucquoy, Dautzenberg & Dollfus, 1883
- Natica alderi var. lactea Jeffreys, 1867
- Natica alderi var. subovalis Jeffreys, 1867
- Natica alderi var. ventricosa Jeffreys, 1867
- Natica complanata Locard, 1886
- Natica intermedia Philippi, 1836 (Invalid: junior homonym of Natica intermedia Deshayes, 1832)
- Natica neustriaca Locard, 1886
- Natica nitida (Donovan, 1804)
- Natica parvula Tapparone Canefri, 1869
- Natica poliana Delle Chiaje, 1826
- Natica pulchella Risso, 1826
- Nerita nitida Donovan, 1804 (original combination)
- Nerita poliana Delle Chiaje, 1830
- Polinices (Euspira) pulchellus (Risso, 1826)
- Polinices (Lunatia) alderi (Forbes, 1838)
- Polinices (Lunatia) intermedia (Philippi, 1836)
- Polinices (Lunatia) poliana (Delle Chiaje, 1826)
- Polinices alderi (Forbes, 1838)
- Polinices pulchella (Risso, 1826)

== Sources ==
- Partly based on the Duch article : nl:Glanzende tepelhoren
