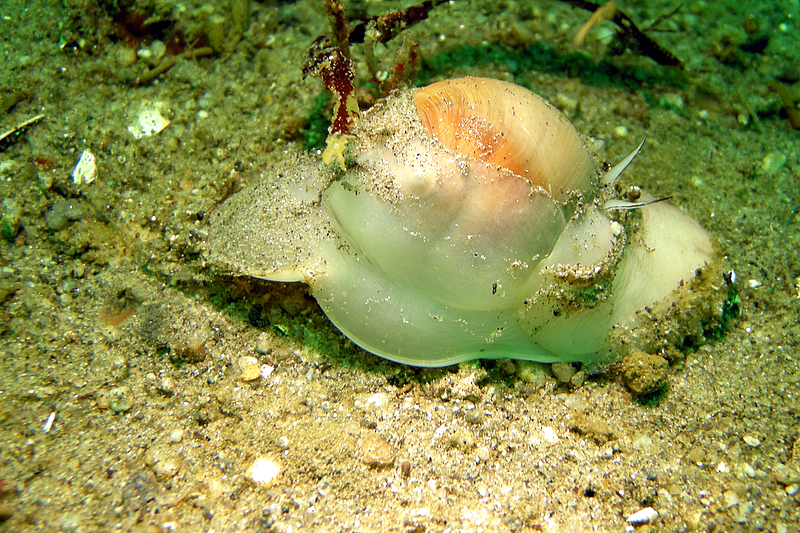

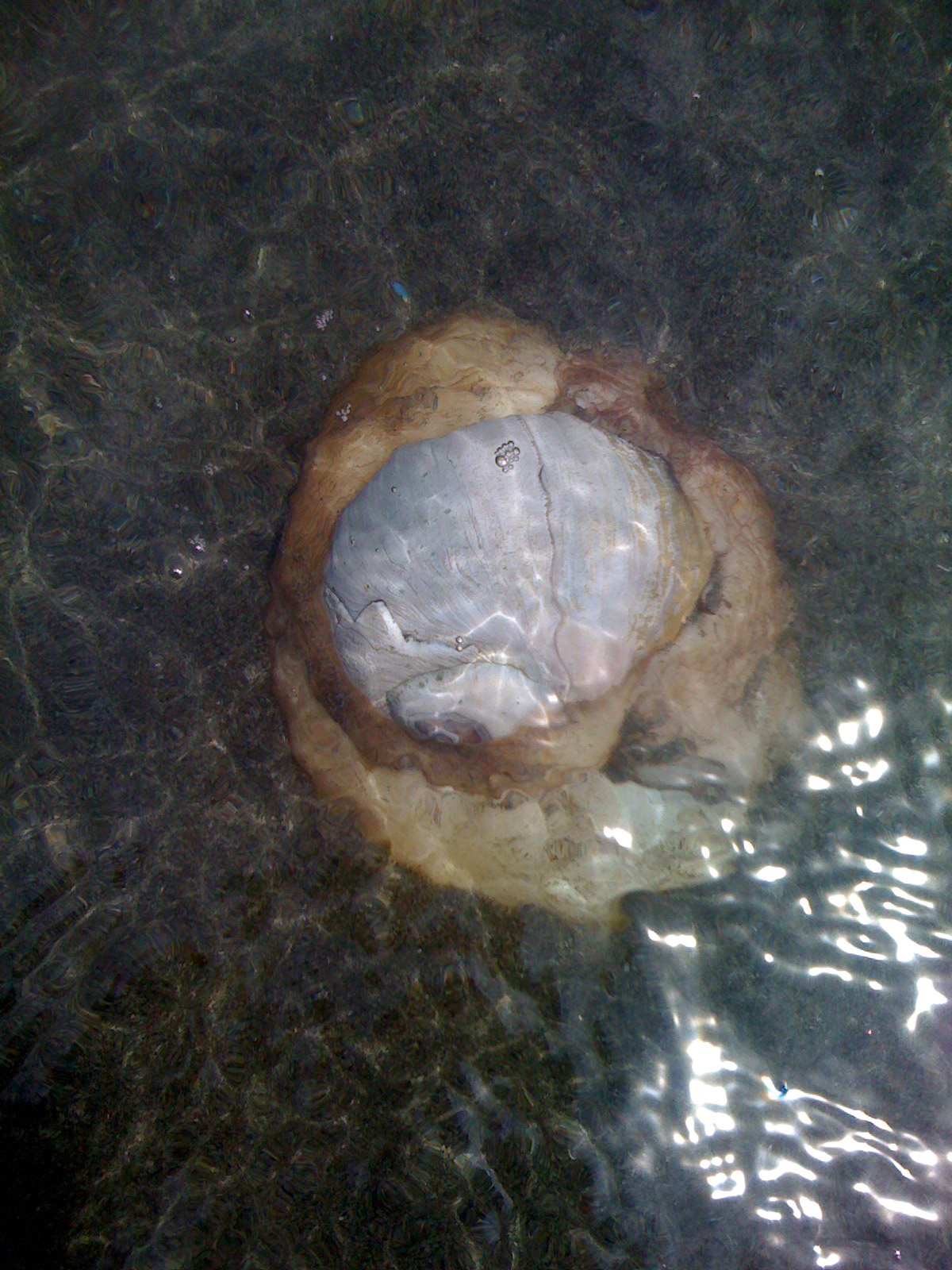

Scientific classification
- Kingdom: Animalia
- Phylum: Mollusca
- Class: Gastropoda
- Subclass: Caenogastropoda
- Order: Littorinimorpha
- Family: Naticidae
- Genus: Neverita
- Species: N. lewisii

Binomial name
- Neverita lewisii (Gould, 1847)

Synonyms
- Euspira lewisii (Gould, 1847); Natica lewisii Gould, 1847 (basionym); Lunatia lewisii (Gould, 1847); Polinices lewisii Gould, 1847

= Neverita lewisii =

Species of mollusc

Neverita lewisii (previously known as Polinices lewisii, Lunatia lewisii, Euspira lewisii), common name Lewis's moon snail, is a species of large operculated sea snail. It is a predatory marine gastropod in the family Naticidae, the moon snails. Traditionally, this species was assigned to either the genus Lunatia, the genus Polinices or the genus Euspira. Recently, it was assigned to the genus Neverita based on molecular data.

This is the largest species in the family.

== Distribution ==
Neverita lewisii lives in the Eastern Pacific, from British Columbia to northern Baja California, Mexico.

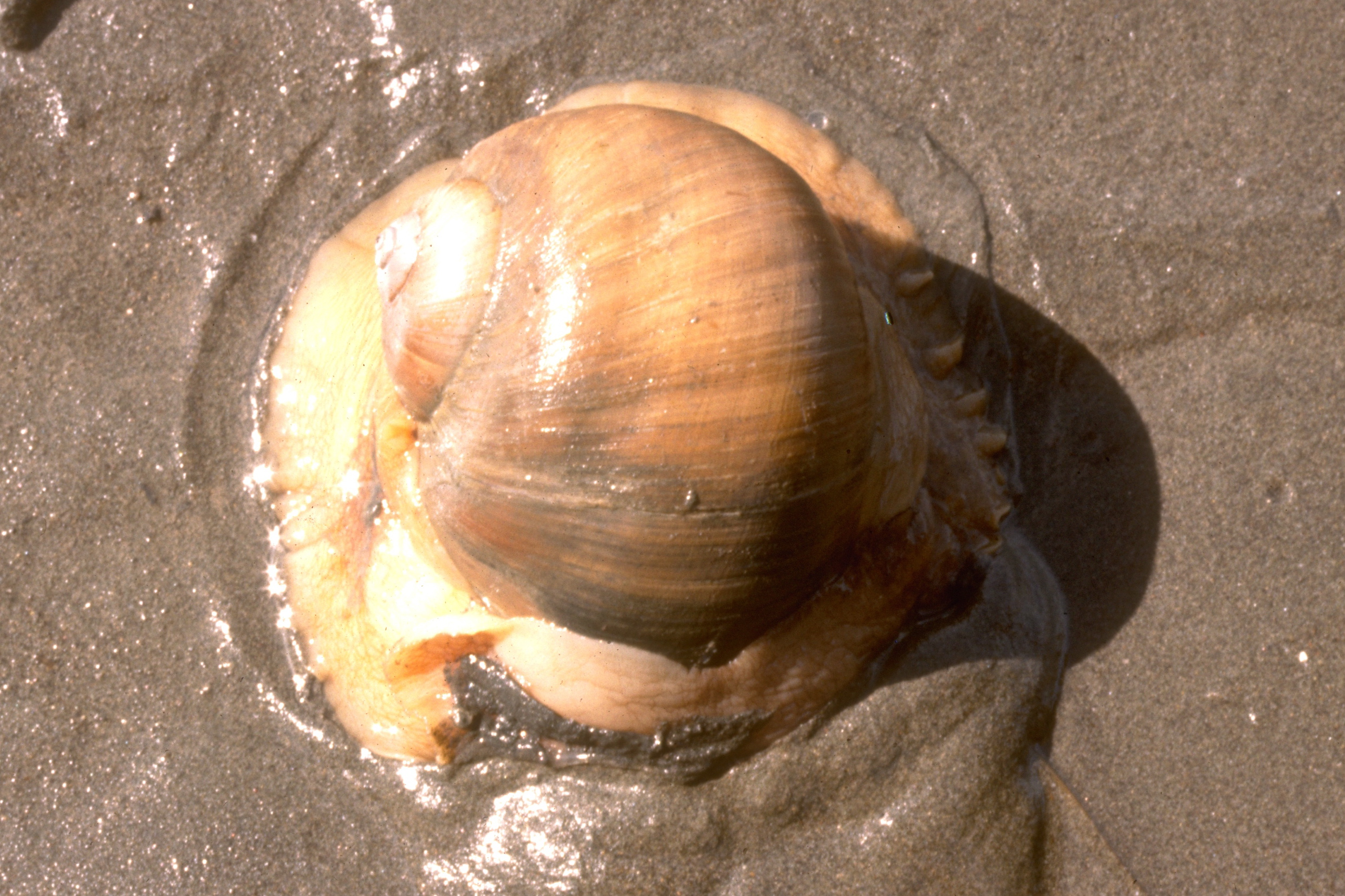
Lunatia lewisii is digging into the mud to protect itself.

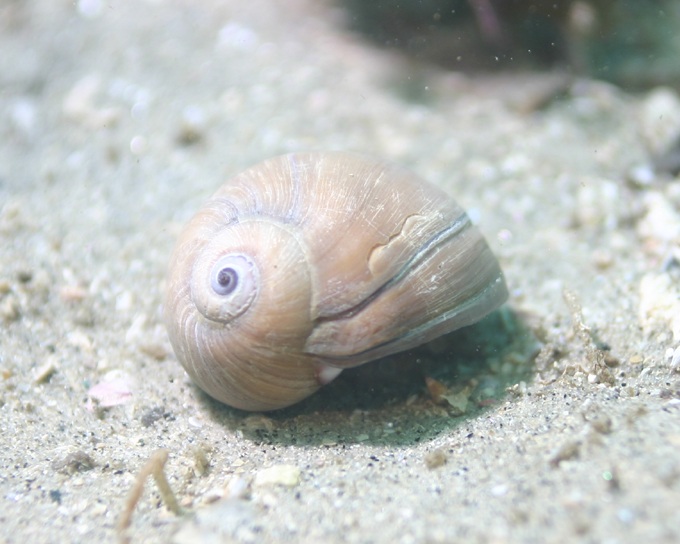
Apical view of a shell of Lunatia lewisii

== Habitat ==
This snail is found intertidally and at depths of up to 180 metres (590 ft), usually ploughing through the substrate looking for prey.

== Description ==
The shell of this species can grow to 14 centimetres (5.5 in) across, the largest of the moon snails. It has an extremely large foot, which when the snail is active, is extended up over the shell and mantle cavity. Part of the propodium contains a black-tipped siphon which leads water into the mantle cavity. The cephalic tentacles, located on its head, are usually visible above the propodium.

When the animal retracts its soft parts into the shell, a lot of water is expelled, thus it is possible to close the shell with its tight-fitting operculum.

== Diet ==
Neverita lewisii feeds mainly on bivalve molluscs by drilling a hole in the shell with its radula and feeding on the organism's soft flesh.

== Reproduction ==
Like other moon snails, this species lays its eggs in a "sand collar". The eggs may number in the thousands and hatch into microscopic larvae which feed on plankton until they undergo torsion and metamorphose into the adult stage.
