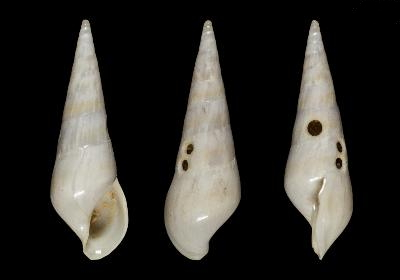
- Shell of Eulimacrostoma lutescens (holotype in MNHN, Paris)

Scientific classification
- Kingdom: Animalia
- Phylum: Mollusca
- Class: Gastropoda
- Subclass: Caenogastropoda
- Order: Littorinimorpha
- Family: Eulimidae
- Genus: Eulimacrostoma
- Species: E. lutescens

Binomial name
- Eulimacrostoma lutescens (Simone, 2002)

Synonyms
- Batheulima lutescens Simone, 2002 (original combination)

= Eulimacrostoma lutescens =

Species of gastropod

Eulimacrostoma lutescens is a species of sea snail, a marine gastropod mollusk in the family Eulimidae.

== Distribution ==
This marine species occurs off the coasts of Brazil within the southern Atlantic Ocean.

== Description ==
The maximum recorded shell length is 10.7 mm.

== Habitat ==
Minimum recorded depth is 610 m. Maximum recorded depth is 640 m.
