= Cimoidea =

Scientific classification
- Kingdom: Animalia
- Phylum: Mollusca
- Class: Gastropoda
- Subclass: Heterobranchia
- Infraclass: "Lower Heterobranchia"
- Superfamily: Cimoidea; Warén, 1993

Families
- See text

Superfamily of molluscs

Cimoidea is a superfamily of rather specialised, highly evolved sea slugs and sea snails (marine gastropod molluscs) within the infraclass "Lower Heterobranchia".

== Families ==
- Cimidae Warén, 1993
- Genus Larochella A. W. B. Powell, 1927 (not in a family)

Synonyms

- Graphididae J.C. N. Barros, Mello, F. N. Barros, S. Lima, Santos, Cabral & Padovan, 2003: synonym of Cimidae Warén, 1993
- † Tofanellidae Bandel, 1995: synonym of Cimidae Warén, 1993
- † Subfamily Usedomellinae Gründel, 1998: synonym of Cimidae Warén, 1993
