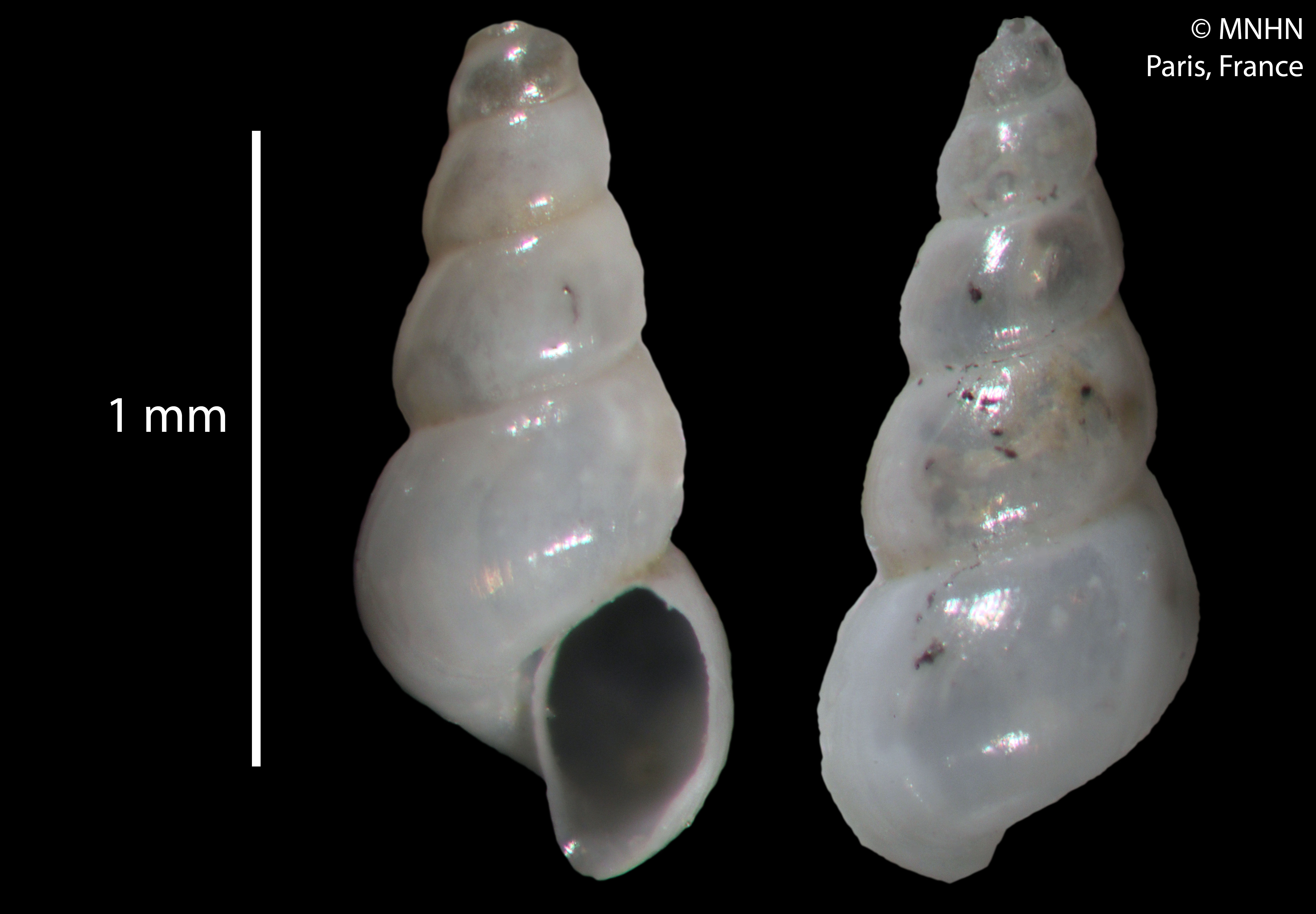
- Shell of Cima mingoranceae (paratype at MNHN, Paris)

Scientific classification
- Kingdom: Animalia
- Phylum: Mollusca
- Class: Gastropoda
- Subclass: Heterobranchia
- Infraclass: "Lower Heterobranchia"
- Superfamily: Cimoidea
- Family: Cimidae; Warén, 1993

Synonyms
- List: Graphididae J.C. N. Barros, Mello, F. N. Barros, S. Lima, Santos, Cabral & Padovan, 2003; † Tofanellidae Bandel, 1995; Tofanellinae Bandel, 1995; † Usedomellinae Gründel, 1998

= Cimidae =

Family of gastropods

The Cimidae is a taxonomic family of sea snails, marine gastropod mollusks in the infraclass Lower Heterobranchia.

== Genera ==
- Atomiscala de Boury, 1909
- Austrorissopsis Grant-Mackie & Chapman-Smith, 1971
- Bouryiscala Cossmann, 1902
- Camponaxis Bandel, 1995
- Cima Chaster, 1898
- Coenaculum Iredale, 1924
- † Conusella Gründel, 1999
- † Cristalloella Bandel, 1995
- Discobasis Cossmann, 1888
- Graphis Jeffreys, 1867
- † Itiscala P. A. Maxwell, 1992
- Mifsudia Mietto, Nofroni & Quaggiotto, 2014
- † Rotfanella Gründel, 1998
- Scalaronoba A. W. B. Powell, 1927
- † Tofanella Bandel, 1995
- † Unzhispira Guzhov, 2019
- † Urlocella Gründel, 1998
- † Usedomella Gründel, 1998

Genera brought into synonymy

- Cioniscus Jeffreys, 1869: synonym of Graphis Jeffreys, 1867 (unnecessary substitute name for Graphis)
- Dissopalia Iredale, 1936: synonym of Bouryiscala Cossmann, 1902
