= John Gwyn Jeffreys =

British conchologist and malacologist

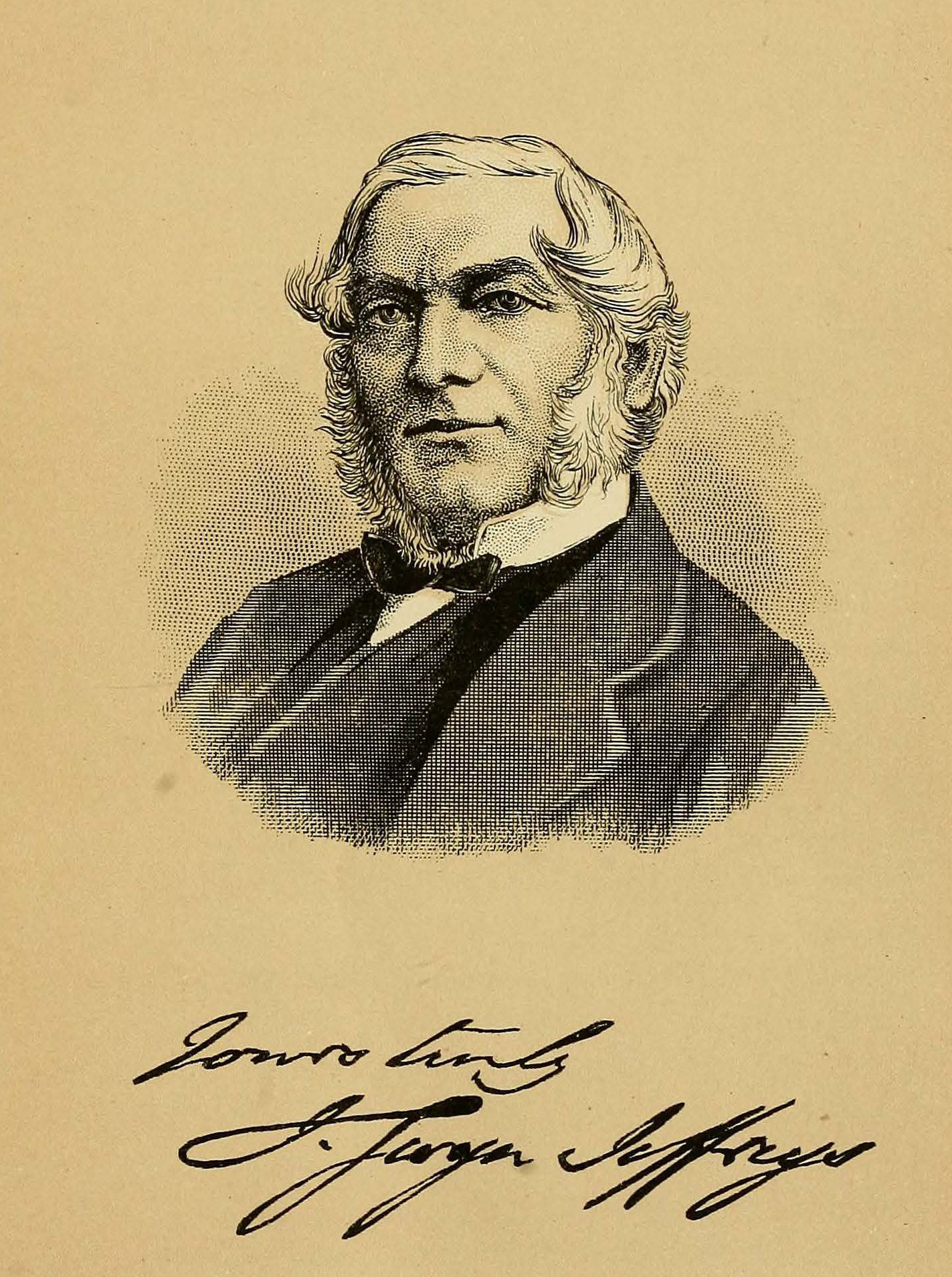
- Born: 18 January 1809; Swansea, Wales
- Died: 21 January 1885 (aged 76); Kensington
- Scientific career
- Fields: conchology, malacology

John Gwyn Jeffreys FRS (18 January 1809 – 21 January 1885) was a British conchologist and malacologist.

== Biography ==
John Gwyn Jeffreys was born on 18 January 1809, at Swansea, Wales. He was the eldest son of J. Jeffreys of Fynone, Glamorgan. Jeffreys was educated in Swansea at the Bishop Gore School (Swansea Grammar School). From the age of seventeen, he was an apprentice to one of the principal solicitors of Swansea, before going to London, where he qualified as a barrister in 1838.

Jeffreys worked as a solicitor in Swansea until 1856, when he was called to the bar in London. But his greater passion was for conchology. He was not satisfied simply to form a collection, but was interested in all aspects of the biology of molluscs.

On 2 April 1840 he became a Fellow of the Royal Society. On 21 June that year he married Ann Nevill at Llangennech. They had a son and four daughters; and were the grandparents of the physicist, Henry Gwyn Jeffreys Moseley.

In 1866 Jeffreys retired from the law, and continued a series of dredging operations he started in 1861 aboard the yacht, Osprey, which he later purchased from his brother-in-law. Accompanied by other specialists in marine life such as Charles William Peach (1800–1886), the Reverend Alfred Merle Norman (1831–1918), George Barlee (1794–1861) and Edward Waller (1803–1873), he dredged the seas around the Shetland Islands, the west of Scotland, the English Channel and the Irish Sea. He also went on expeditions to Norway.

He went on to take part in several deepsea expeditions as scientific leader – the Porcupine expeditions in 1869 and 1870, the Valorous expedition to Greenland in 1875, and the French Travailleur expedition in 1880.

In or shortly after 1866 he moved from London to Ware in Hertfordshire, where he bought the Greyfriars Priory, and made it a meeting-place for many British and foreign artists. He served as Justice of the Peace for Glamorgan, Brecon and Hertfordshire, and was appointed High Sheriff of the latter in 1877. He was Treasurer of the Linnean Society of London and Geological Society of London for many years. Jeffreys was also a member of the British Association for the Advancement of Science.

After the death of his wife in 1881, Jeffreys moved to Kensington, and he died there 24 January 1885.

His principal work was his well known 'British Conchology,' in five volumes, the best on the subject. He was throughout his life a most indefatigable worker, and at time of his death was still actively engaged upon the description of the deep-sea mollusca dredged by the Lightning and the Porcupine expeditions. He read the ninth of his series of papers on this subject at the Zoological Society's meeting four days before his death. It ranged from the Ianthinidæ to the Cerithiopsidæ, including seventy-five species, of which twenty-three were new, including one new genus.

Among the species first scientifically described by Jeffreys are Rissoella opalina (1848), Cima minima (1858), and Cheirodonta pallescens (1867).

His collection of shells and specimens was bought by William Healey Dall (1845–1927) for the Smithsonian Institution in the United States of America, and was partly donated to the National Museum of Natural History, Washington, D.C.

== Bibliography ==
Jeffreys was the author of a number of books and articles on conchology and the mechanics of sea dredging. Of particular note was British Conchology, or an account of the Mollusca which now inhabit the British Isles and the surrounding seas (five volumes, 1862 – 1865), illustrated by George Brettingham Sowerby II. A complete list of scientific papers by John Gwyn Jeffreys including reviews is online here .

== Sources ==
- Carpenter, W.B. (1885). John Gwyn Jeffreys, Obituary. Proceedings of the Royal Society of London 38: xiv–xviii
- Darwin, Charles; Burkhardt, Frederick (1999). The Correspondence of Charles Darwin. Vol. 11. Cambridge: Cambridge University Press. p. 833. ISBN 9780521590334.
- Hans G. Hansson. "Biographical Etymology of Marine Organism Names (BEMON)". University of Gothenburg. Archived from the original on 16 May 2011.
- Parts of this article were translated from the French Wikipedia
