= Cochlis =

Scientific classification
- Kingdom: Animalia
- Phylum: Mollusca
- Class: Gastropoda
- Subclass: Caenogastropoda
- Order: Littorinimorpha
- Superfamily: Naticoidea
- Family: Naticidae
- Subfamily: Naticinae
- Genus: Cochlis; Röding, 1798

Type species
- Nerita vittata Gmelin, 1791

Genus of gastropods

Cochlis is a genus of predatory sea snails, marine gastropod mollusks in the subfamily Naticinae of the family Naticidae, the moon snails.

== Species ==
- Cochlis neglecta (Mayer, 1858) †
- Cochlis raropunctata (Sasso, 1827) †
- Cochlis sulcooperculata (Ruggieri, 1949) †
- Cochlis vittata (Gmelin, 1791)

Species brought into synonymy

- Cochlis alapapilionis Röding, 1798: synonym of Naticarius alapapilionis Röding, 1798(original combination)
- Cochlis albula Röding, 1798: synonym of Natica spadicea (Gmelin, 1791)
- Cochlis cornea Röding, 1798: synonym of Natica spadicea (Gmelin, 1791)
- Cochlis explanata Röding, 1798: synonym of Naticarius orientalis (Gmelin, 1791)
- Cochlis fanel Röding, 1798: synonym of Natica hebraea (Martyn, 1786): synonym of Naticarius hebraeus (Martyn, 1786)
- Cochlis flammea Röding, 1798: synonym of Natica vittata (Gmelin, 1791): synonym of Cochlis vittata (Gmelin, 1791)
- Cochlis lineata Röding, 1798: synonym of Tanea lineata Röding, 1798(original combination)
- Cochlis migratoria Powell, 1927: synonym of Notocochlis gualteriana (Récluz, 1844)
- Cochlis onca Röding, 1798: synonym of Naticarius onca Röding, 1798(original combination)
- Cochlis pavimentum Röding, 1798: synonym of Naticarius onca (Röding, 1798)
- Cochlis pittensis Marwick, 1928 †: synonym of Tanea pittensis (Marwick, 1928) †
- Cochlis plicata Röding, 1798: synonym of Stigmaulax sulcatus (Born, 1778)
- Cochlis rufescens Röding, 1798: synonym of Natica spadicea (Gmelin, 1791)
- Cochlis socius Finlay, 1927 †: synonym of Tanea consortis (Finlay, 1924) † (Invalid replacement name for Natica consortis Finlay, 1924)
- Cochlis stercusmuscarum (Gmelin, 1791): synonym of Naticarius stercusmuscarum (Gmelin, 1791)
- Cochlis tigrina Röding, 1798: synonym of Paratectonatica tigrina Röding, 1798(original combination)
- Cochlis undulata Röding, 1798: synonym of Tanea undulata Röding, 1798(original combination)
- Cochlis vafer Finlay, 1930: synonym of Notocochlis gualteriana (Récluz, 1844)
