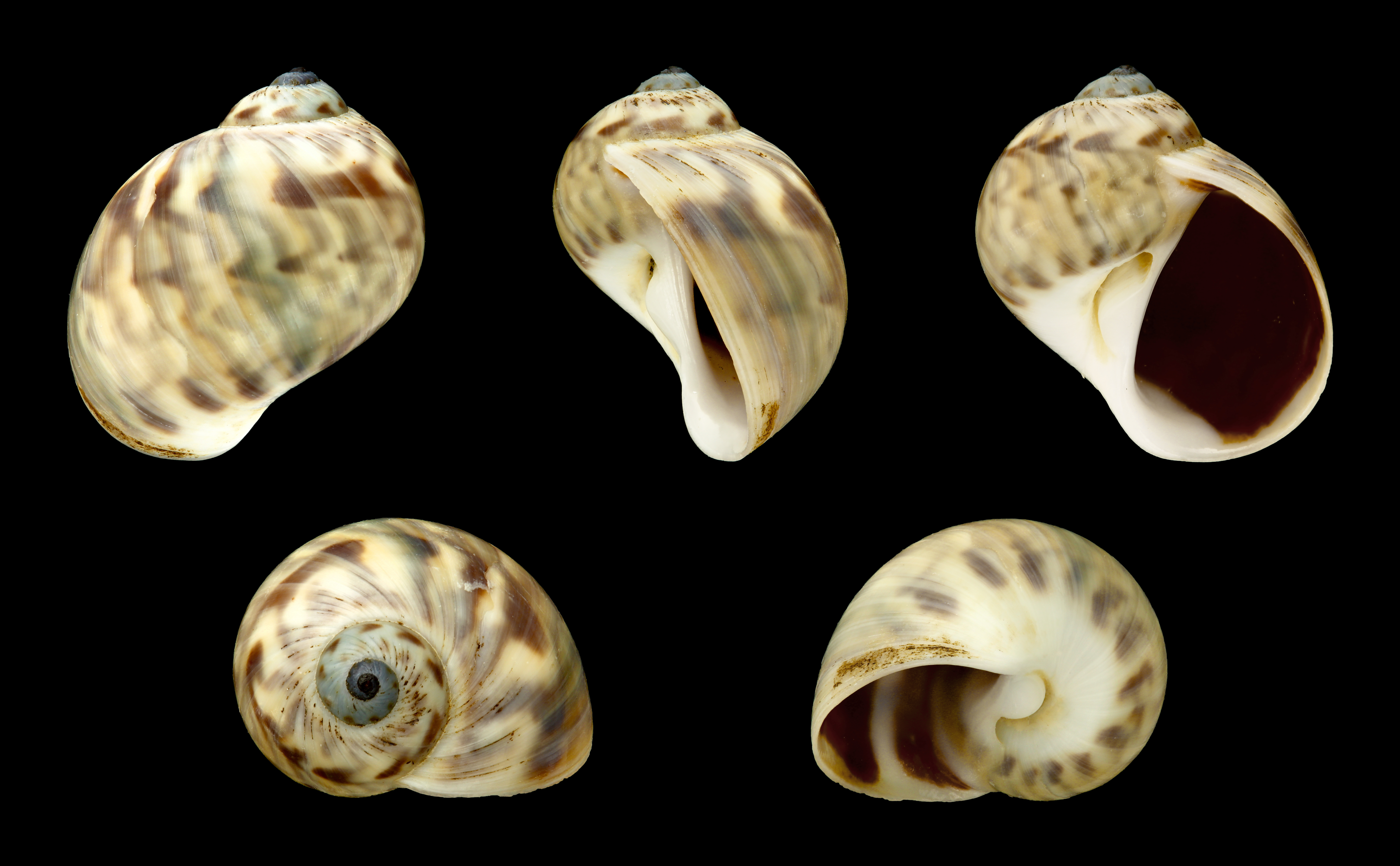
- shell of Notocochlis chemnitzii

Scientific classification
- Kingdom: Animalia
- Phylum: Mollusca
- Class: Gastropoda
- Subclass: Caenogastropoda
- Order: Littorinimorpha
- Superfamily: Naticoidea
- Family: Naticidae
- Subfamily: Naticinae
- Genus: Notocochlis; Powell, 1933

Type species
- Cochlis migratoria Powell, 1927

Synonyms
- Natica (Notocochlis)

= Notocochlis =

Genus of gastropods

Notocochlis is a genus of predatory sea snails, marine gastropod mollusks in the subfamily Naticinae of the family Naticidae, the moon snails.

This genus is known in the fossil record from the Oligocene epoch to the Quaternary period (age range 23.03 to 0.0 million years ago.). Fossils have been collected in the sediments of Austria, Germany, India, Italy and Thailand.

== Species ==
Species within the genus Notocochlis include:

- Notocochlis asellus (Reeve, 1855)
- Notocochlis cernica (Jousseaume, 1874)
- Notocochlis chemnitzii (Pfeiffer, 1840)
- Notocochlis dillwynii (Payraudeau, 1826)
- Notocochlis gualteriana Récluz, 1844
- Notocochlis guesti (Harasewych & Jensen, 1984)
- Notocochlis insularum (Watson, 1886)
- Notocochlis isabelleana (d'Orbigny, 1841)
- Notocochlis laurae Costa & Pastorino, 2012
- Notocochlis tranquilla (Melvill & Standen, 1901)

Species brought into synonymy

- Notocochlis antoni (Philippi, 1851): synonym of Notocochlis gualteriana (Récluz, 1844)
- Notocochlis hilaris (G.B. Sowerby III, 1914): synonym of Tanea hilaris (G.B. Sowerby, III, 1914)
- Notocochlis marochiensis (Gmelin, 1791): synonym of Natica marochiensis (Gmelin, 1791)
- Notocochlis sagittata (Menke, 1843): synonym of Tanea sagittata (Menke, 1843)
- Notocochlis schoutanica (May, 1913): synonym of Tasmatica schoutanica (May, 1913)
- Notocochlis tigrina (Röding, 1798): synonym of Paratectonatica tigrina (Röding, 1798)
- Notocochlis tosaensis (Kuroda, 1961): synonym of Tanea tosaensis (Kuroda, 1961)
- Notocochlis subcostata (Tenison Woods, 1878): synonym of Natica subcostata (J.E. Tenison-Woods, 1878)
- Notocochlis venustula (Philippi, 1851): synonym of Notocochlis gualteriana (Récluz, 1844)
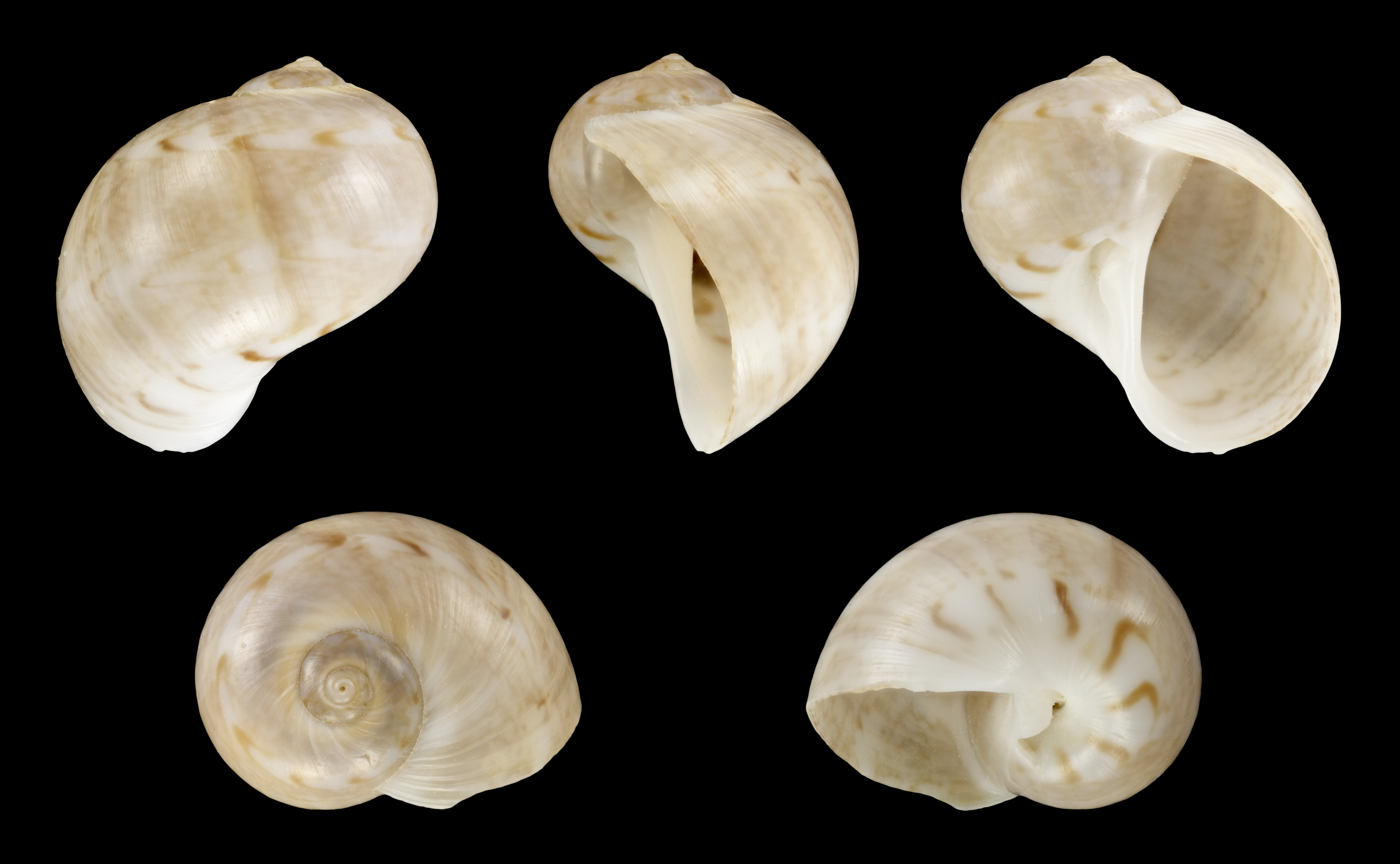
Notocochlis dillwynii

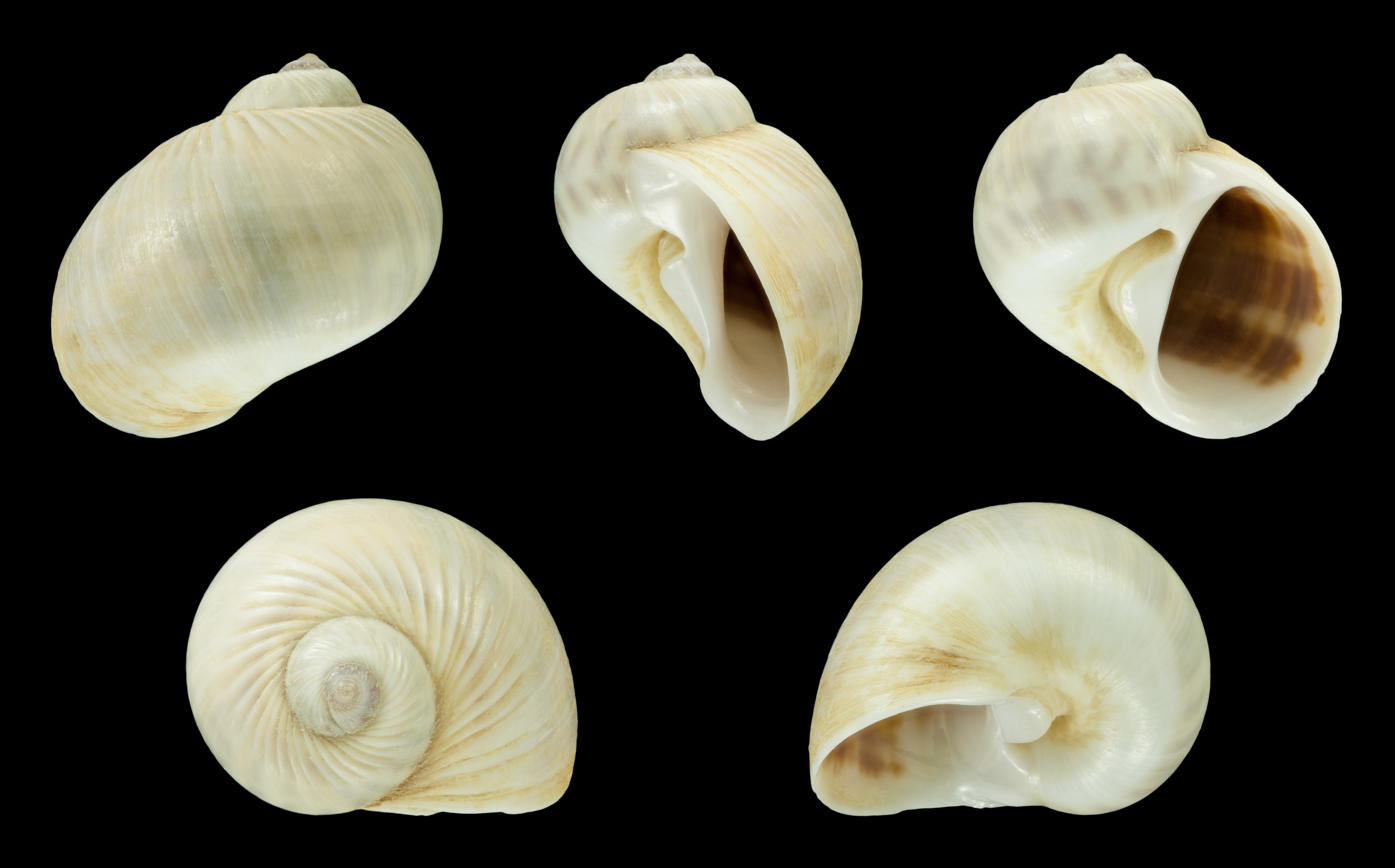
Notocochlis gualteriana

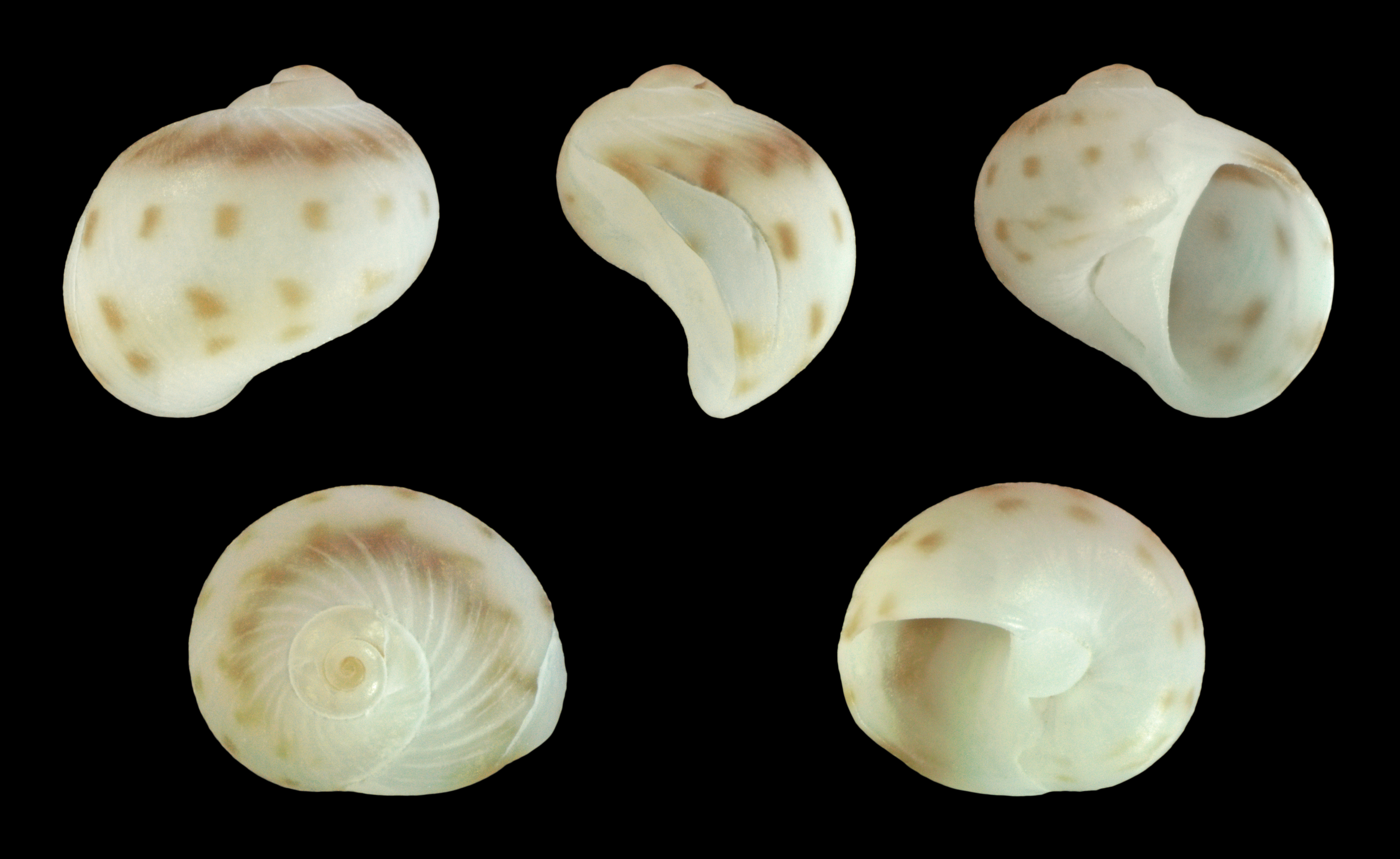
Notocochlis gualteriana
