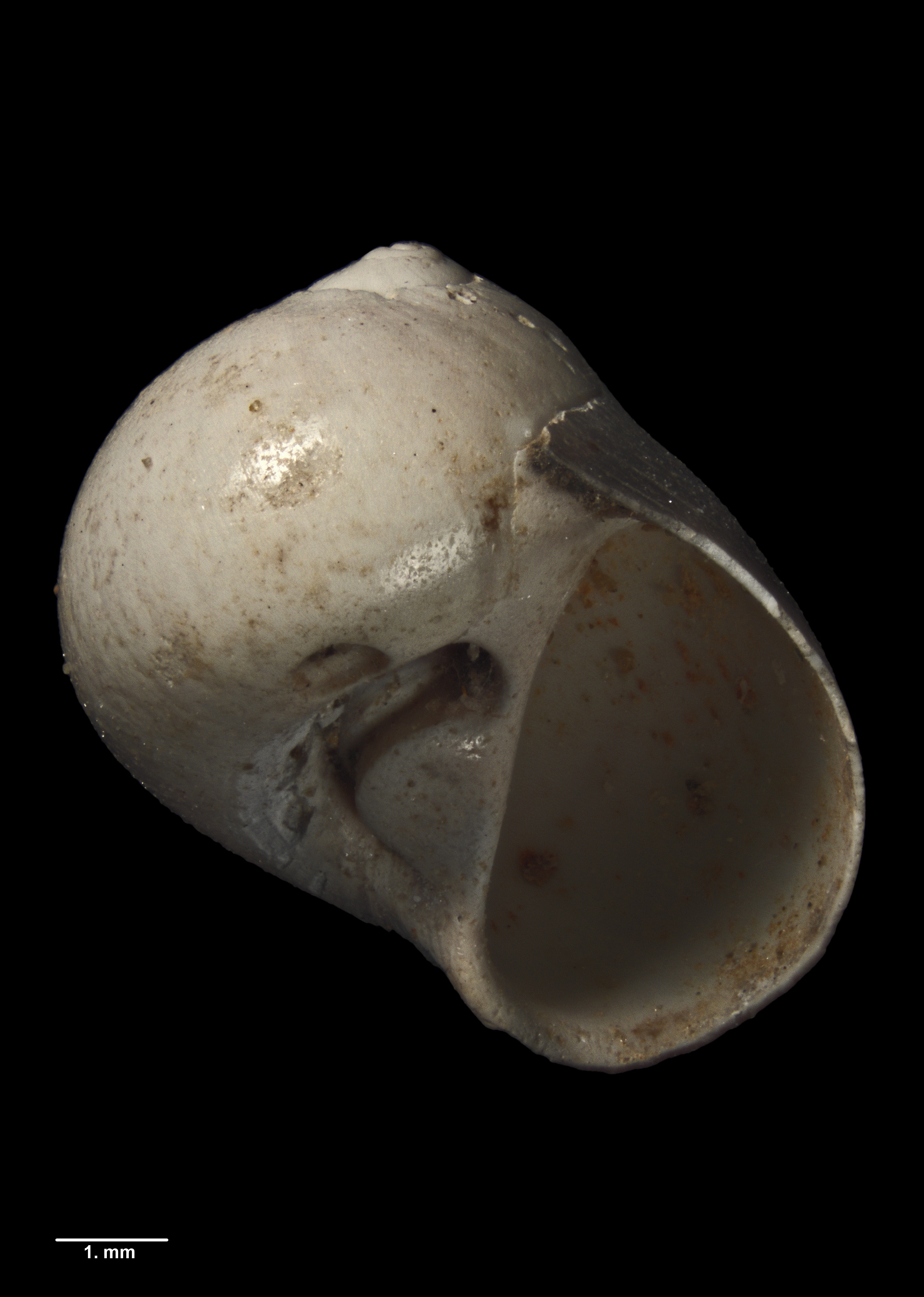
- Taniella notocenica

Scientific classification
- Kingdom: Animalia
- Phylum: Mollusca
- Class: Gastropoda
- Subclass: Caenogastropoda
- Order: Littorinimorpha
- Family: Naticidae
- Subfamily: Naticinae
- Genus: †Taniella; H. J. Finlay & Marwick, 1937

Type species
- † Natica notocenica H. J. Finlay, 1924

Synonyms
- Pristinacca H. J. Finlay & Marwick, 1937; Taniella (Pristinacca) Finlay & Marwick, 1937; Taniella (Taniella) Finlay & Marwick, 1937

= Taniella =

Taniella Temporal range: Early Paleocene–Pleistocene

Genus of gastropods

Taniella is a genus of extinct sea snails, marine gastropod molluscs in the family Naticidae. Species in the genus begin to appear in fossil record in the Early Paleocene, and are primarily found in New Zealand, with some fossils known to occur in Australia.

== Description ==
The genus is significantly smaller than a morphologically similar genus, Tanea, and can be distinguished due to its lower spire, and straight spire outlines that have a tangential suture that is weakly impressed.

== Taxonomy ==
Taniella was first described in 1937 by Harold Finlay and John Marwick. While no extant members of the genus have been discovered, the Tasmanian species Natica elkingtoni has been identified as being a potential living member of Taniella.

== Distribution ==
The majority of known species have been found in New Zealand, dating to between the Early Paleocene (e.g. T. senisculus) and the Pleistocene (e.g. T. planisuturalis). Two Australian species are known, T. subnoae of the Port Phillip Basin, which dates to the late Oligocene, and T. weymouthensis of the St Vincent Basin, which dates to the middle Miocene.

== Species ==
Species within the genus Taniella include:

- † Taniella bacca (Marwick, 1924)
- † Taniella intermedia P. A. Maxwell, 1992
- † Taniella mima P. A. Maxwell, 1988
- † Taniella motutaraensis (A. W. B. Powell, 1935)
- † Taniella notocenica (H. J. Finlay, 1924)
- † Taniella planisuturalis (Marwick, 1924)
- † Taniella poliniciformis Beu, 1970
- † Taniella senisculus (Marwick, 1924)
- † Taniella subnoae (Tate, 1893)
- † Taniella tantilla Marwick, 1960
- † Taniella weymouthensis Ludbrook, 1958
