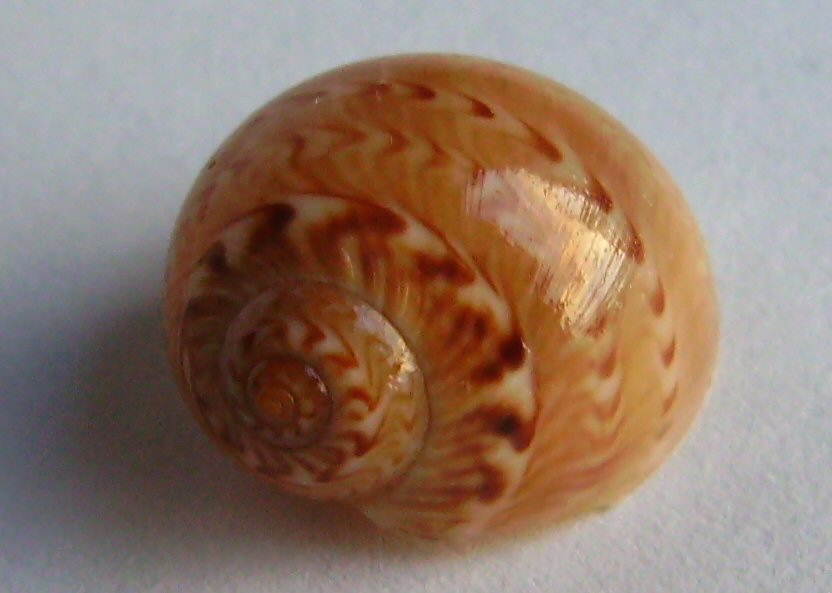
- A shell of Tanea zelandica

Scientific classification
- Kingdom: Animalia
- Phylum: Mollusca
- Class: Gastropoda
- Subclass: Caenogastropoda
- Order: Littorinimorpha
- Family: Naticidae
- Genus: Tanea
- Species: T. zelandica

Binomial name
- Tanea zelandica (Quoy and Gaimard, 1832)

Synonyms
- Cochlis zelandica (Quoy & Gaimard, 1832); Natica souleyetiana Récluz, 1850; Natica zelandica Quoy and Gaimard, 1832

= Tanea zelandica =

Species of gastropod

Tanea zelandica, common name the necklace shell or the New Zealand moon snail, is a species of medium-sized sea snail, a predatory marine gastropod mollusc in the Family Naticidae, the moon snails or necklace shells.

== Description ==
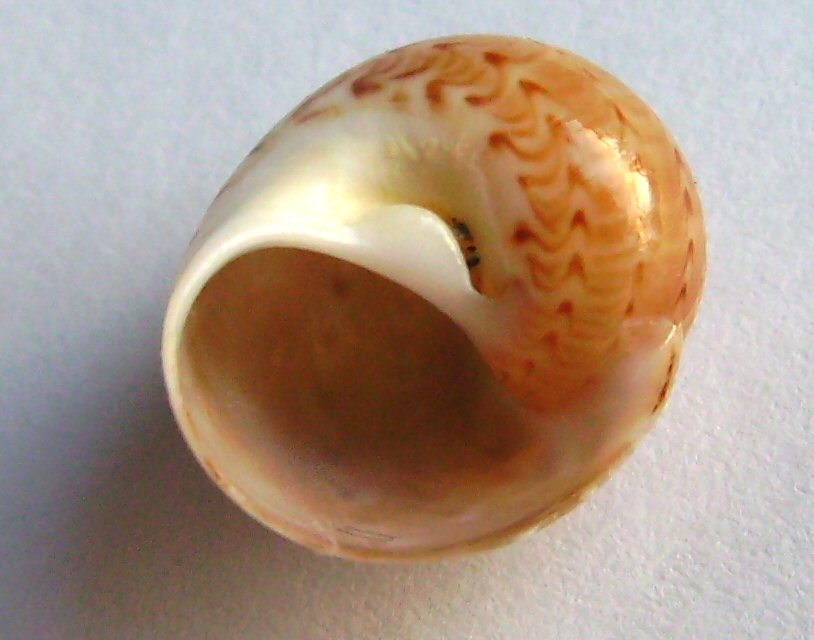
A shell of Tanea zelandica basal view

The size of an adult shell varies between 15 mm and 33 mm

== Distribution ==
This marine species is found along New Zealand.
