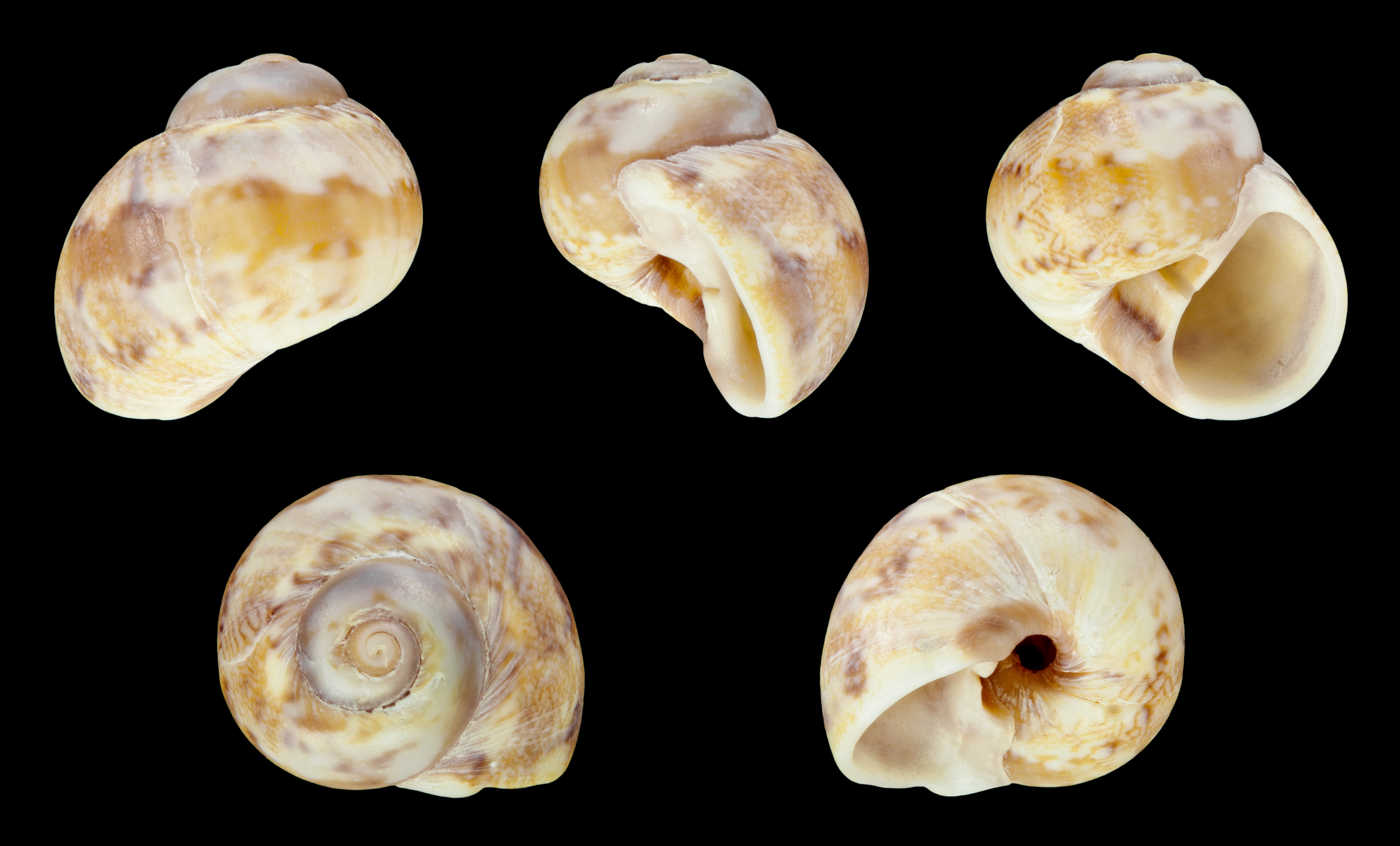

Scientific classification
- Kingdom: Animalia
- Phylum: Mollusca
- Class: Gastropoda
- Subclass: Caenogastropoda
- Order: Littorinimorpha
- Family: Naticidae
- Genus: Cochlis
- Species: C. vittata

Binomial name
- Cochlis vittata (Gmelin, 1791)

Synonyms
- Cochlis flammea Röding, 1798; Natica (Natica) vittata (Gmelin, 1791); Natica (Natica) vittata textilis Reeve, 1855; Natica carinifera Philippi, 1852; Natica intricatoides Hidalgo, 1873; Natica textilis Reeve, 1855; Natica vittata (Gmelin, 1791); Natica vittata var. fusca Pallary, 1920; Naticarius vittatus (Gmelin, 1791); Nerita vittata Gmelin, 1791 (original combination)

= Cochlis vittata =

Species of gastropod

Cochlis vittata is a species of predatory sea snail, a marine gastropod mollusk in the family Naticidae, the moon snails.
