= Stigmaulax cancellatus =

Scientific classification
- Kingdom: Animalia
- Phylum: Mollusca
- Class: Gastropoda
- Subclass: Caenogastropoda
- Order: Littorinimorpha
- Family: Naticidae
- Genus: Stigmaulax
- Species: S. cancellatus

Binomial name
- Stigmaulax cancellatus (Hermann, 1781)

Species of gastropod

Stigmaulax cancellatus is a species of predatory sea snail, a marine gastropod mollusc in the family Naticidae, the moon snails.

== Distribution ==
Found in the Caribbean

== Description ==
The maximum recorded shell length is 24 mm.

== Habitat ==
Minimum recorded depth is 0 m. Maximum recorded depth is 70 m.
