= Paratectonatica =

Scientific classification
- Kingdom: Animalia
- Phylum: Mollusca
- Class: Gastropoda
- Subclass: Caenogastropoda
- Order: Littorinimorpha
- Superfamily: Naticoidea
- Family: Naticidae
- Subfamily: Naticinae
- Genus: Paratectonatica; Azuma, 1961

Genus of gastropods

Paratectonatica is a genus of small to medium-sized predatory sea snails, marine gastropods in the subfamily Naticinae of the family Naticidae, the moon snails.

== Species ==
- Paratectonatica tigrina (Röding, 1798)
