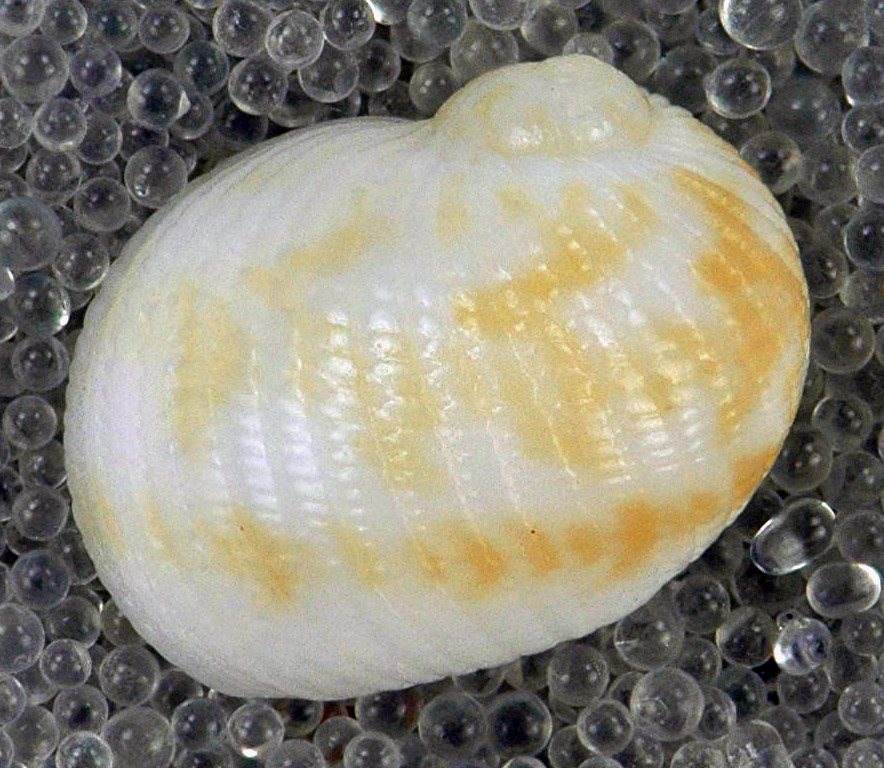
- Stigmaulax sulcatus (Born, 1778) - abapertural view of a grooved moonsnail shell, 0.75 cm tall.

Scientific classification
- Kingdom: Animalia
- Phylum: Mollusca
- Class: Gastropoda
- Subclass: Caenogastropoda
- Order: Littorinimorpha
- Superfamily: Naticoidea
- Family: Naticidae
- Subfamily: Naticinae
- Genus: Stigmaulax; Mörch, 1852

Type species
- Nerita sulcata Born, 1778

Synonyms
- Aloconatica Shikama, 1971

= Stigmaulax =

Genus of gastropods

Stigmaulax is a genus of predatory sea snails, marine gastropod molluscs in the subfamily Naticinae of the family Naticidae, the moon snails.

== Species ==
Species within the genus Stigmaulax include:

- Stigmaulax cancellatus (Hermann, 1781)
- Stigmaulax cayennensis (Récluz, 1850)
- Stigmaulax elenae (Récluz, 1844)
- Stigmaulax kushime (Shikama, 1971)
- Stigmaulax sulcatus (Born, 1778)
