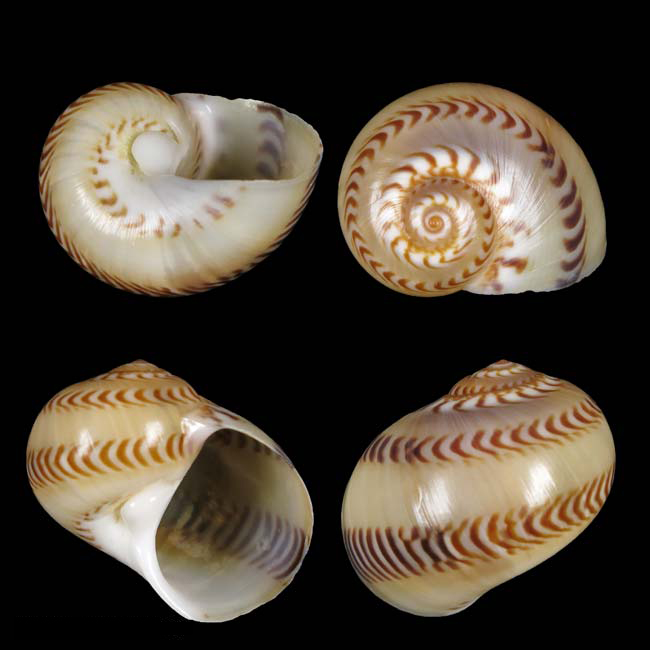

Scientific classification
- Kingdom: Animalia
- Phylum: Mollusca
- Class: Gastropoda
- Subclass: Caenogastropoda
- Order: Littorinimorpha
- Family: Naticidae
- Genus: Tanea
- Species: T. hollmanni

Binomial name
- Tanea hollmanni Poppe, Tagaro & Stahlschmidt, 2015

= Tanea hollmanni =

Species of gastropod

Tanea hollmanni is a species of sea snail, a marine gastropoda mollusk in the family Naticidae.

== Distribution ==
This marine species occurs off the Philippines.

== Original description ==
- Poppe G.T., Tagaro S.P. & Stahlschmidt P. (2015). New shelled molluscan species from the central Philippines I. Visaya. 4(3): 15–59. page(s): 23, pl. 7 figs 1-3 .
