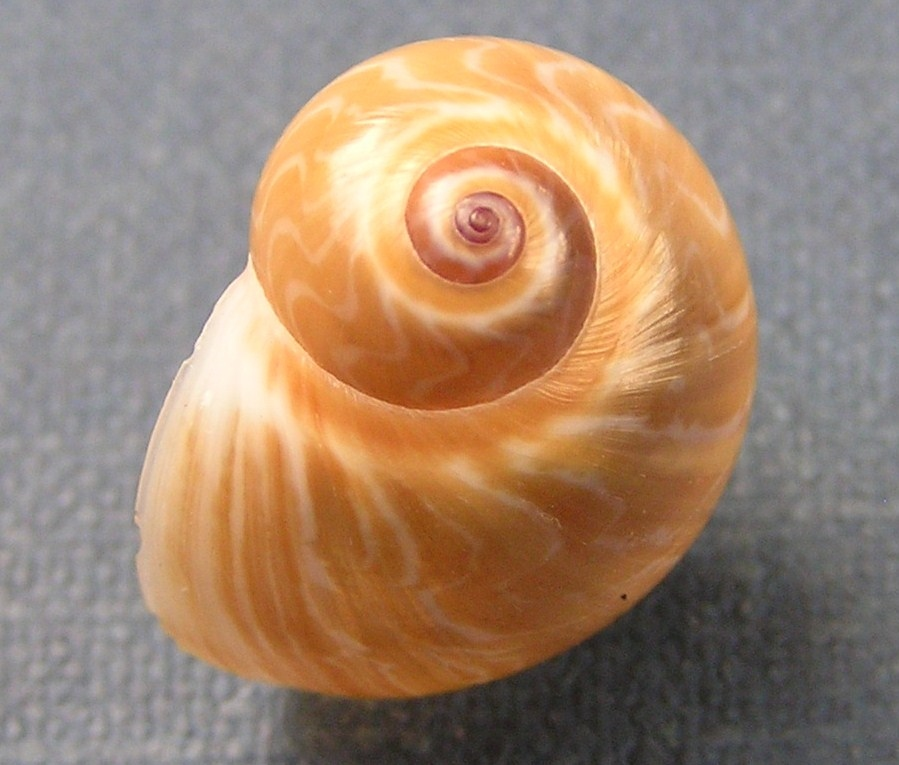

Scientific classification
- Kingdom: Animalia
- Phylum: Mollusca
- Class: Gastropoda
- Subclass: Caenogastropoda
- Order: Littorinimorpha
- Family: Naticidae
- Genus: Tanea
- Species: T. areolata

Binomial name
- Tanea areolata (Recluz, 1844)

Synonyms
- Natica areolata Récluz, 1844 (basionym)

= Tanea areolata =

Species of gastropod

Tanea areolata is a species of predatory sea snail, a marine gastropod mollusc in the family Naticidae, the moon snails.

== Description ==
The shell is small, 7–15 mm in height. It is thin and fragile, and moderately globose, with a low spire. It is white in colour and shows broad, arrow-shaped or curved orange-brown axial markings, arranged in three spiral zones on the body whorl and separated by narrow white lines. In some specimens the markings become confluent and the shell appears smooth.

The aperture is semi-ovate. The funicle is white and prominent, spiralling up into the umbilicus; in some specimens the umbilicus remains open, whereas in others it is filled by the funicle, leaving only a narrow posterior opening. The operculum is white and calcareous, and bears one to two marginal ribs; the columellar edge is either smooth or finely serrated. The periostracum is thin, light brown, and moderately opaque.

== Distribution ==
This species is distributed in the Red Sea and in the Indian Ocean along Tanzania and the Mascarene Basin; in the Western Pacific Ocean.
