= Notocochlis guesti =

Scientific classification
- Kingdom: Animalia
- Phylum: Mollusca
- Class: Gastropoda
- Subclass: Caenogastropoda
- Order: Littorinimorpha
- Family: Naticidae
- Genus: Notocochlis
- Species: N. guesti

Binomial name
- Notocochlis guesti (Harasewych & Jensen, 1984)

Synonyms
- Natica guesti Harasewych & Jensen, 1984 (basionym)

Species of gastropod

Notocochlis guesti, live mollusc, expanded.

Notocochlis guesti is a species of predatory sea snail, a marine gastropod mollusk in the family Naticidae, the moon snails.

== Distribution ==
Locus typicus: St. Martin, Lesser Antilles.

This deepwater species occurs in the Gulf of Mexico, the Caribbean Sea and the Lesser Antilles. Dredged at 500 ft. depth, Barbados.

== Description ==
The maximum recorded shell length is 33 mm.

Notocochlis guesti, live mollusc, expanded.

== Habitat ==
Minimum recorded depth is 165 m. Maximum recorded depth is 421 m.
