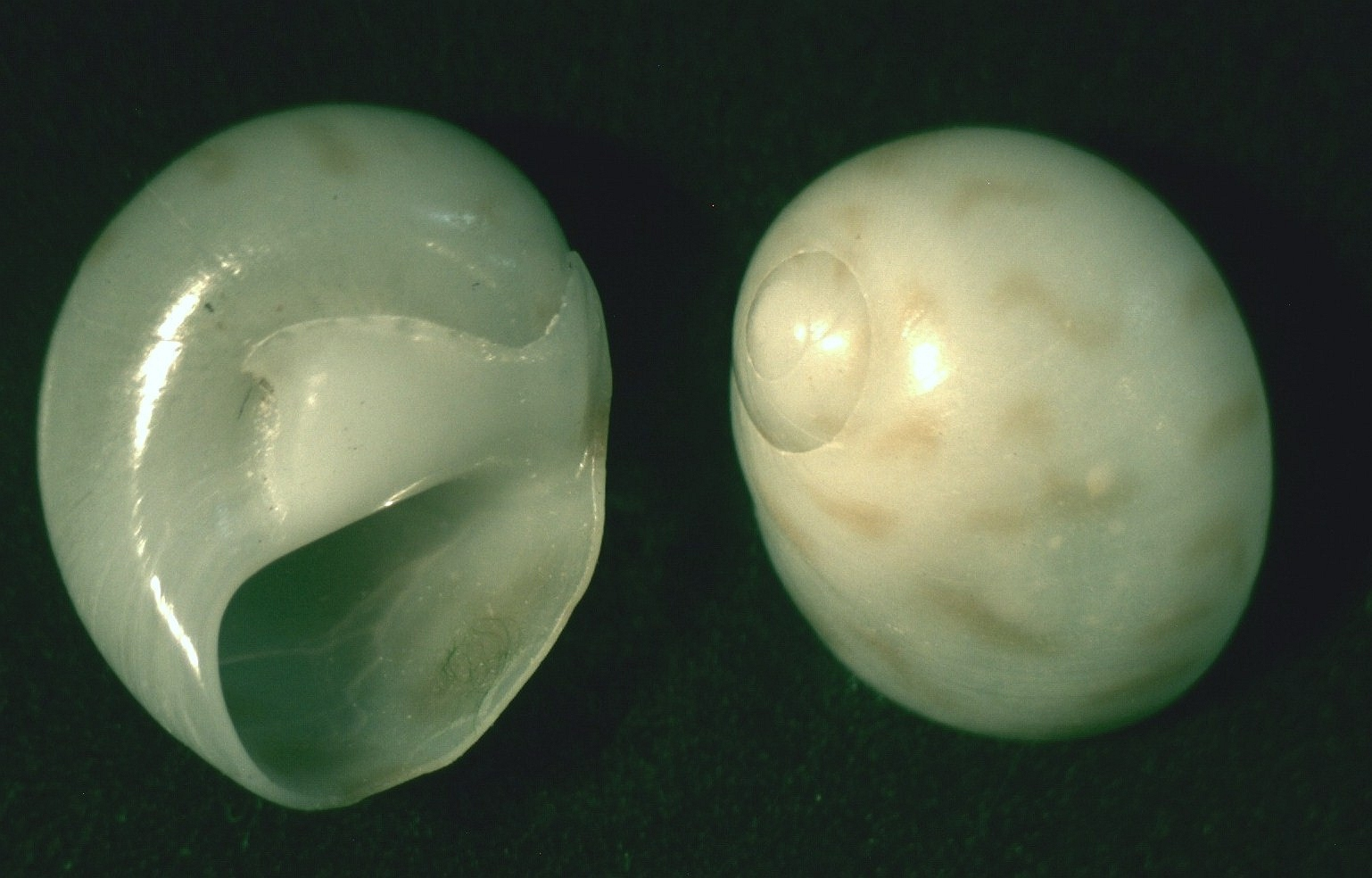
- Tasmatica schoutanica

Scientific classification
- Kingdom: Animalia
- Phylum: Mollusca
- Class: Gastropoda
- Subclass: Caenogastropoda
- Order: Littorinimorpha
- Superfamily: Naticoidea
- Family: Naticidae
- Subfamily: Naticinae; Guilding, 1834

Type genus
- Natica Scopoli, 1777

Genera
- See text

= Naticinae =

Subfamily of gastropods

The Naticinae are a subfamily of medium to large-sized predatory sea snails, marine gastropod molluscs in the family Naticidae, the moon snails.

== General characteristics ==
The Naticinae are characterized by their calcareous operculum and by the presence of a distinct funicle within the umbilicus, which is observable in most species. It is mainly a tropical group, which is brightly colored and patterned.

The shell is small to moderate in size, varicoloured, ornamented with bands, spots or axial flames: often smooth, occasionally sculptured with spiral striae or radial ribs at the sutures. The spire is low, the body whorl is inflated. The aperture is semiovate, rarely ovate, smooth within. The labial lip is moderately thin. The umbilicus is open; the funicle is well developed, occasionally covered by a parietal callus

The operculum is calcareous, unisulcate or multisulcate. The rachidian of the radula has 1-5 cusps in addition to 2 accessory basal cusps, lateral with 1-7 cusps; inner marginal generally bifid but occasionally simple, outer marginal always simple.

The animal is moderate in size, andis able to retract completely into its shell.

== Genera ==
Genera within the subfamily Naticinae include:

- Cochlis Röding, 1798
- Cryptonatica Dall, 1892
- Glyphepithema Rehder, 1943
- Natica Scopoli, 1777, the type genus
- Naticarius Duméril, 1805
- Notocochlis Powell, 1933
- Paratectonatica Azuma, 1961
- Proxiuber Powell, 1933
- † Pseudolinices Harzhauser, Landau & Guzhov, 2025
- Quantonatica Iredale, 1936
- Stigmaulax Mörch, 1852
- Tanea Marwick, 1931
- † Taniella Finlay & Marwick, 1937
- Tasmatica Finlay & Marwick, 1937
- Tectonatica Sacco, 1890

Genera brought into synonymy

- Aloconatica Shikama, 1971: synonym of Stigmaulax Mörch, 1852
- Boreonatica Golikov & Kussakin, 1974: synonym of Cryptonatica Dall, 1892 (junior objective synonym of Cryptonatica)
- Eunatica Melvill, 1899 : synonym of Natica Scopoli, 1777 (junior subjective synonym)
- Lunaia S. S. Berry, 1964: synonym of Natica Scopoli, 1777
- Nacca Risso, 1826: synonym of Natica Scopoli, 1777
- Naticarinus [sic] : synonym of Naticarius Duméril, 1805 (misspelling - incorrect subsequent spelling)
- Naticus Montfort, 1810: synonym of Naticarius Duméril, 1805
- Pristinacca Finlay & Marwick, 1937: synonym of † Taniella Finlay & Marwick, 1937
- Sulconatica Golikov & Kussakin, 1974: synonym of Cryptonatica Dall, 1892
