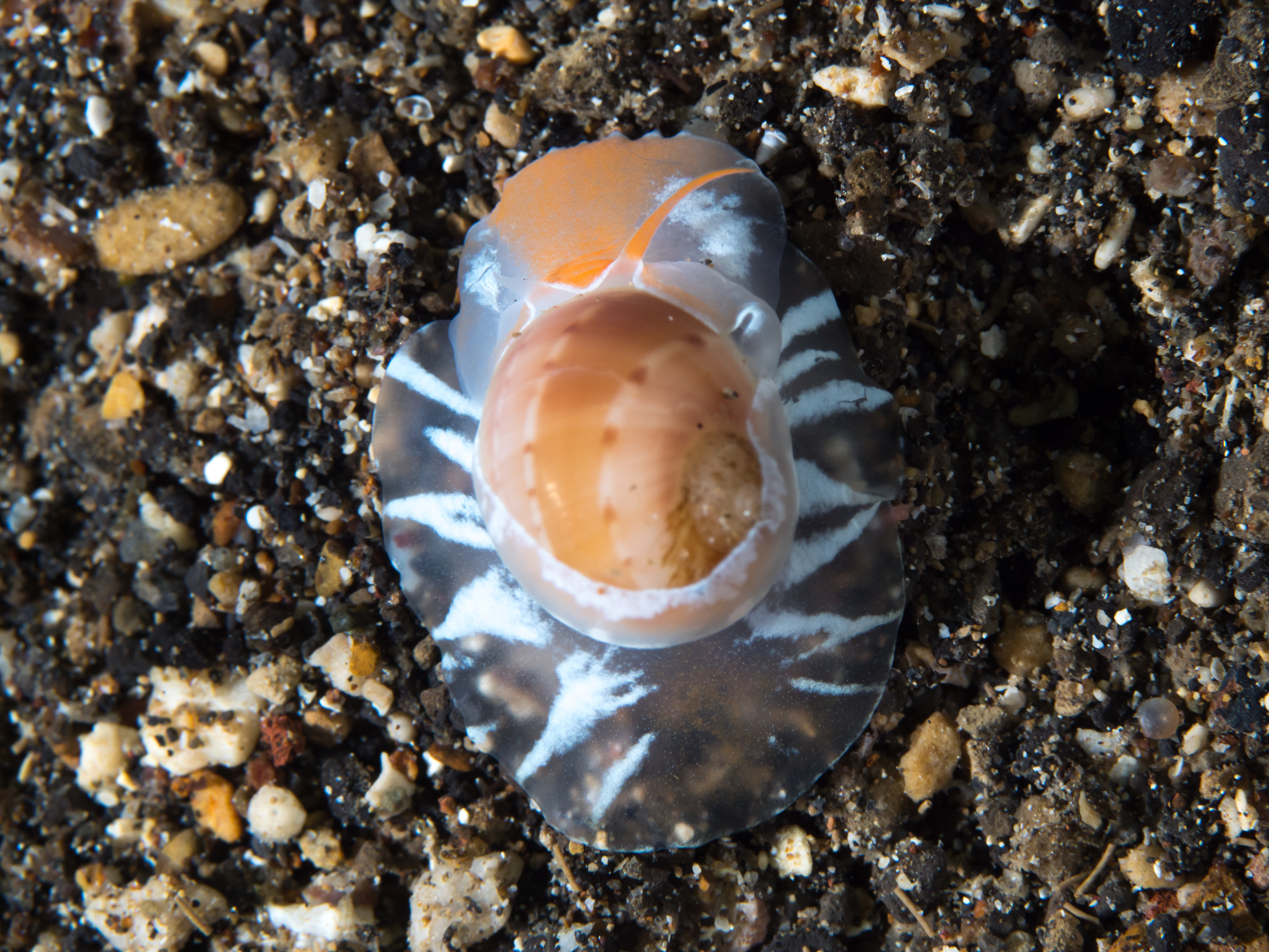
- A live specimen of Glyphepithema alapapilionis

Scientific classification
- Kingdom: Animalia
- Phylum: Mollusca
- Class: Gastropoda
- Subclass: Caenogastropoda
- Order: Littorinimorpha
- Superfamily: Naticoidea
- Family: Naticidae
- Subfamily: Naticinae
- Genus: Glyphepithema; Rehder, 1943

Type species
- Natica (Naticarius) idiopoma Pilsbry & H. N. Lowe, 1932

Synonyms
- Natica (Glyphepithema) Rehder, 1943 superseded rank

= Glyphepithema =

Genus of gastropods

Glyphepithema is a genus (or subgenus) of predatory sea snails, marine gastropods in the subfamily Naticinae of the family Naticidae, the moon snails.

== General characteristics ==
(Original description) The shell is globose, with a short spire and whorls that are smooth except for subobscure, axial, retractively curved furrows on the upper portion of the penultimate whorl. The body whorl is flattened below the suture and is covered by a thin brownish periostracum, which is strongly wrinkled in the subsutural area. The colour is pale gray‑brown to white, encircled by four narrow bands of deep chestnut spots on a white ground. The umbilicus is broad and contains a stout funicle.

The operculum bears a variably shaped nuclear callus, followed by a broad rib produced by the near-complete fusion of two or three smaller ribs. Between this rib and the outer margin lie several smaller, unequal ribs, the outer ribs usually being variously sculptured and often joined at their tops by a sculptured calcareous deposit that roofs over the intervening spaces.

== Species ==
- Glyphepithema alapapilionis (Röding, 1798)
- Glyphepithema floridana Rehder, 1943
- Glyphepithema idiopoma (Pilsbry & H. N. Lowe, 1932)
