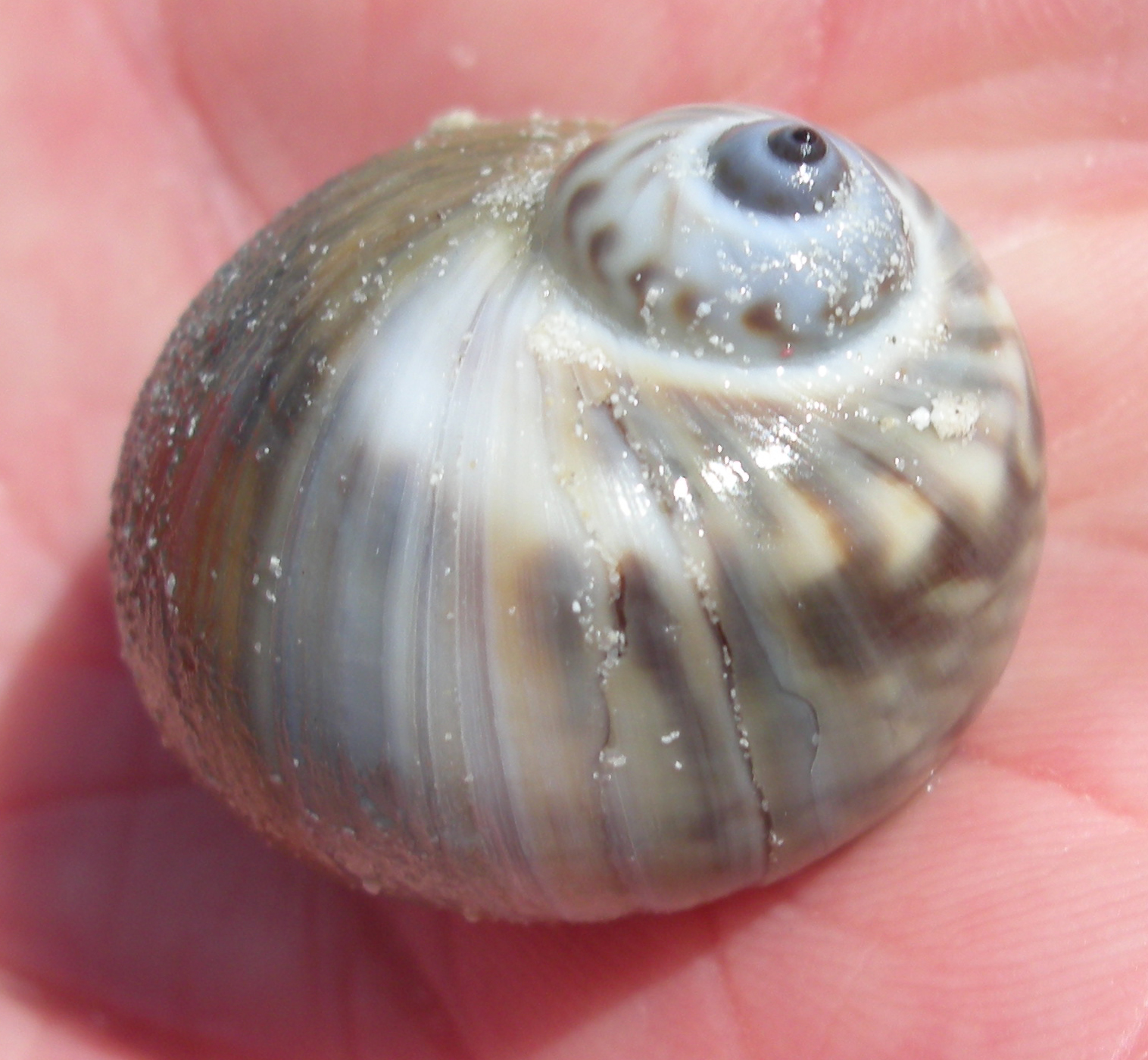
- A live animal in the Gulf of California
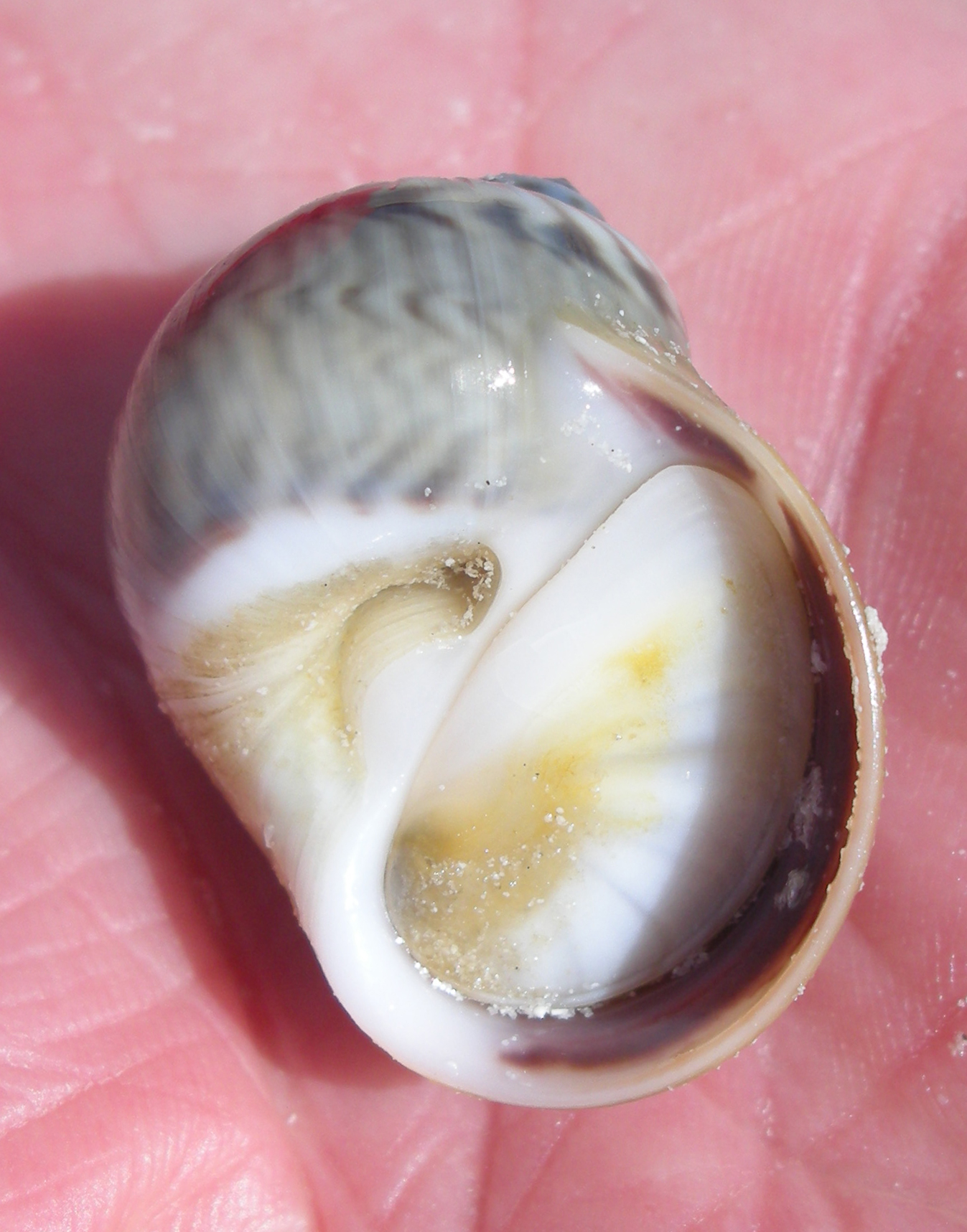
- Showing operculum

Scientific classification
- Kingdom: Animalia
- Phylum: Mollusca
- Class: Gastropoda
- Subclass: Caenogastropoda
- Order: Littorinimorpha
- Family: Naticidae
- Genus: Notocochlis
- Species: N. chemnitzii

Binomial name
- Notocochlis chemnitzii (L. Pfeiffer, 1840)

Synonyms
- Natica chemnitzii L. Pfeiffer, 1840; Natica pritchardi Forbes, 1852; Natica undata Philippi, 1852

= Notocochlis chemnitzii =

Species of gastropod

Notocochlis chemnitzii, or Chemnitz' moon snail, is a species of gastropod mollusc. It was first described to science in 1840 by Ludwig Karl Georg Pfieffer. The animal is likely named after conchologist Johann Hieronymus Chemnitz.

== Description ==
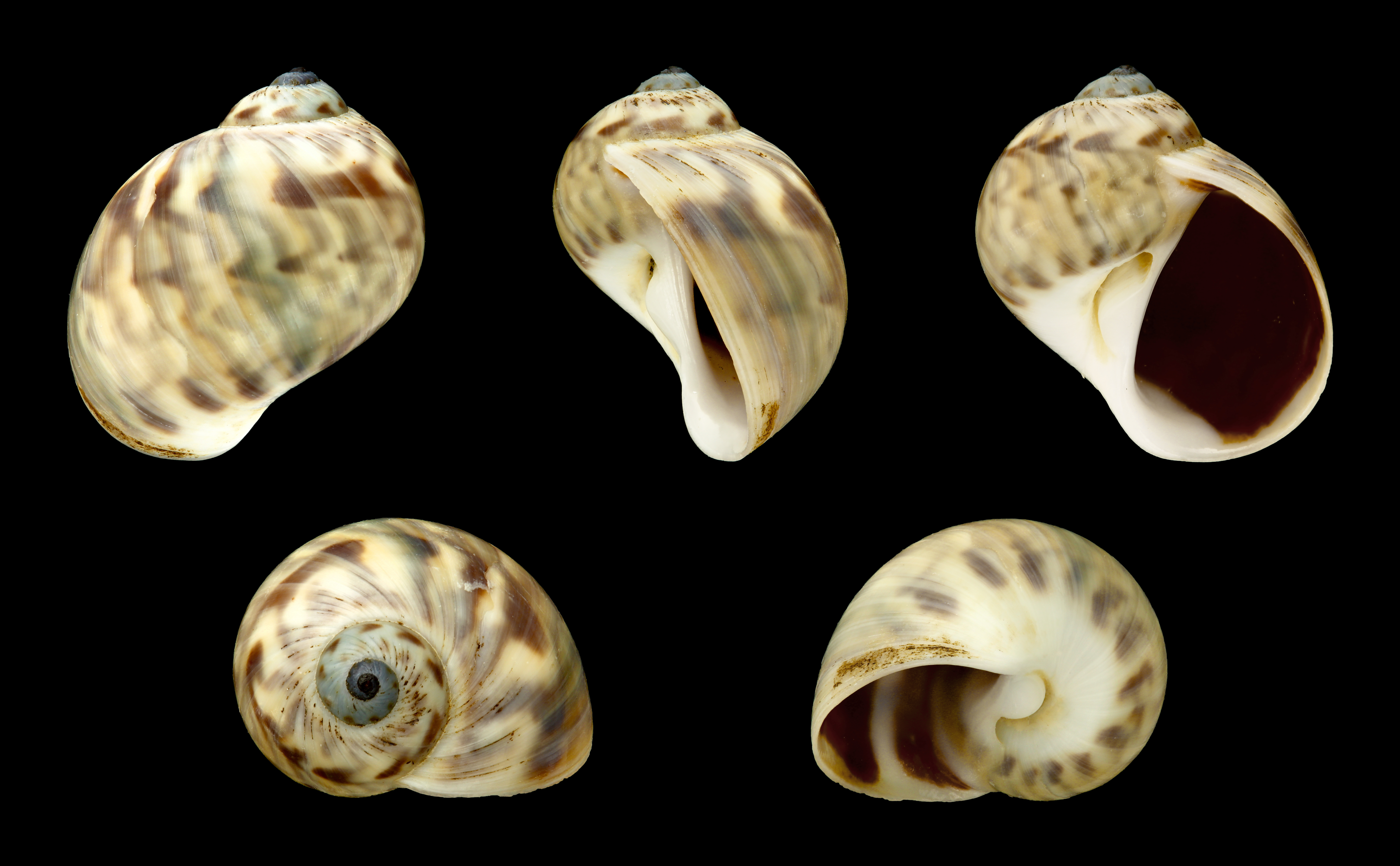
Multiple perspectives on Notocochlis chemnitzii

The shell is smooth. There are four to five whorls with a short spire. It is grayish-blue to grayish-yellow, with arrow-shaped bands of brown and white. Some individuals may have a white band on the upper part of their whorls. The interior of the shell is brown. The shell has a maximum length of 33 mm (1.3 inches) and a diameter of 31 mm. The operculum is white and smooth.

== Distribution ==
These snails are found from Baja California Sur to Peru, including the Gulf of California. This species is also found in the Galapagos Islands. They live in the intertidal zone, down to 3 meters (10 feet) deep, on sand and mud flats.

== Life history ==
This moon snail preys on small bivalves. It is actively mobile, hunting on soft seabeds for buried clams. It uses an abrasive appendage called a radula to drill into the shells of small clams. Once inside, it secretes digestive fluids and then feeds on the clam slurry that results. There is some evidence that one of the species it preys on is Chionista fluctifraga, the smooth Venus clam.
