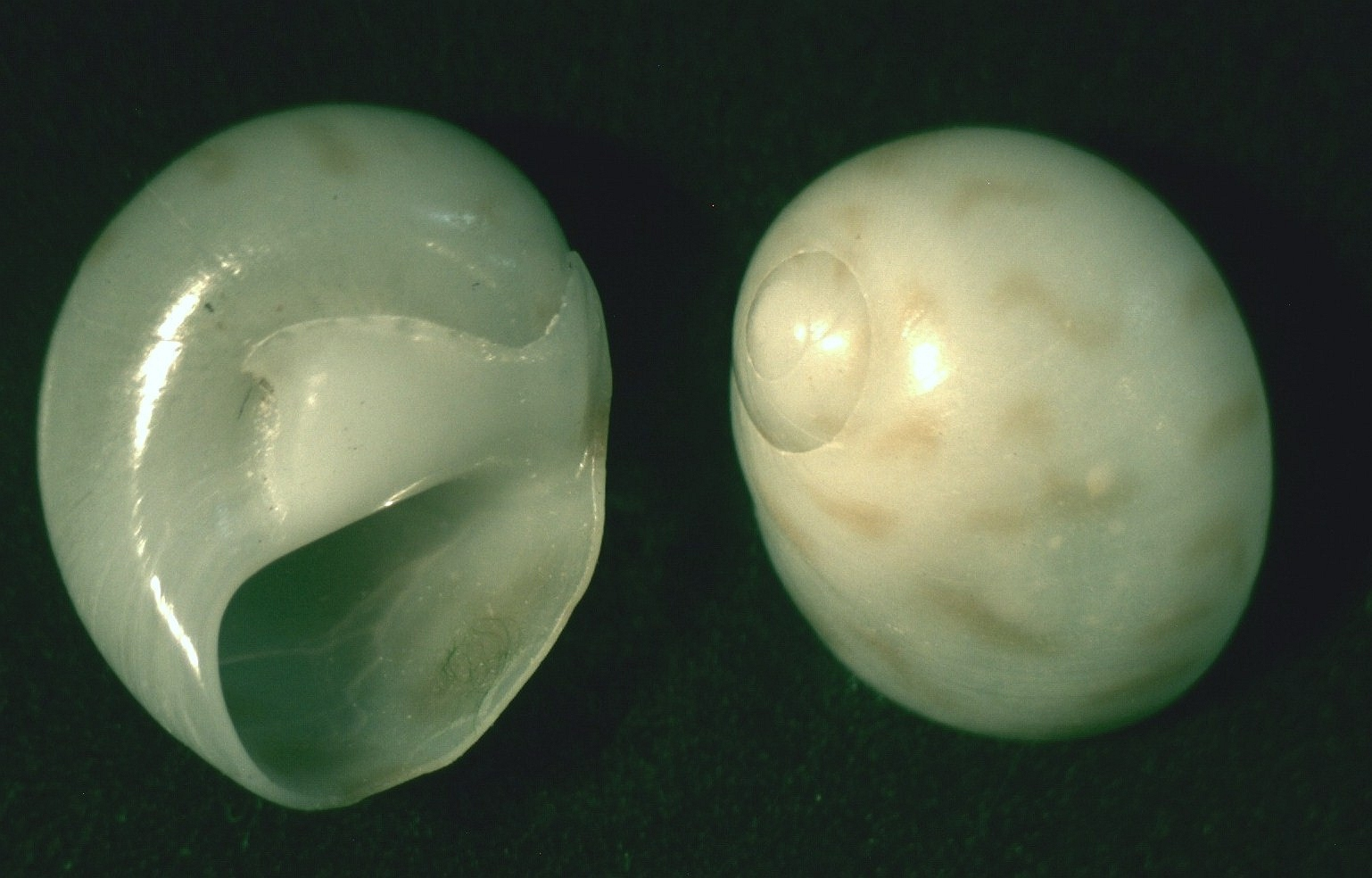
- shell of Tasmatica schoutanica

Scientific classification
- Kingdom: Animalia
- Phylum: Mollusca
- Class: Gastropoda
- Subclass: Caenogastropoda
- Order: Littorinimorpha
- Family: Naticidae
- Subfamily: Naticinae
- Genus: Tasmatica; Finlay & Marwick, 1937

Type species
- Natica schoutanica May, 1913

= Tasmatica =

Genus of gastropods

Tasmatica, common name necklace shells, is a genus of sea snails, marine gastropod molluscs in the family Naticidae, the moon snails or necklace shells.

== Species ==
- † Tasmatica modestina Ludbrook, 1958
- Tasmatica schoutanica (May, 1912) - synonym: Notocochlis schoutanica diatheca Iredale, 1936
- Tasmatica sticta (Verco, 1909)
