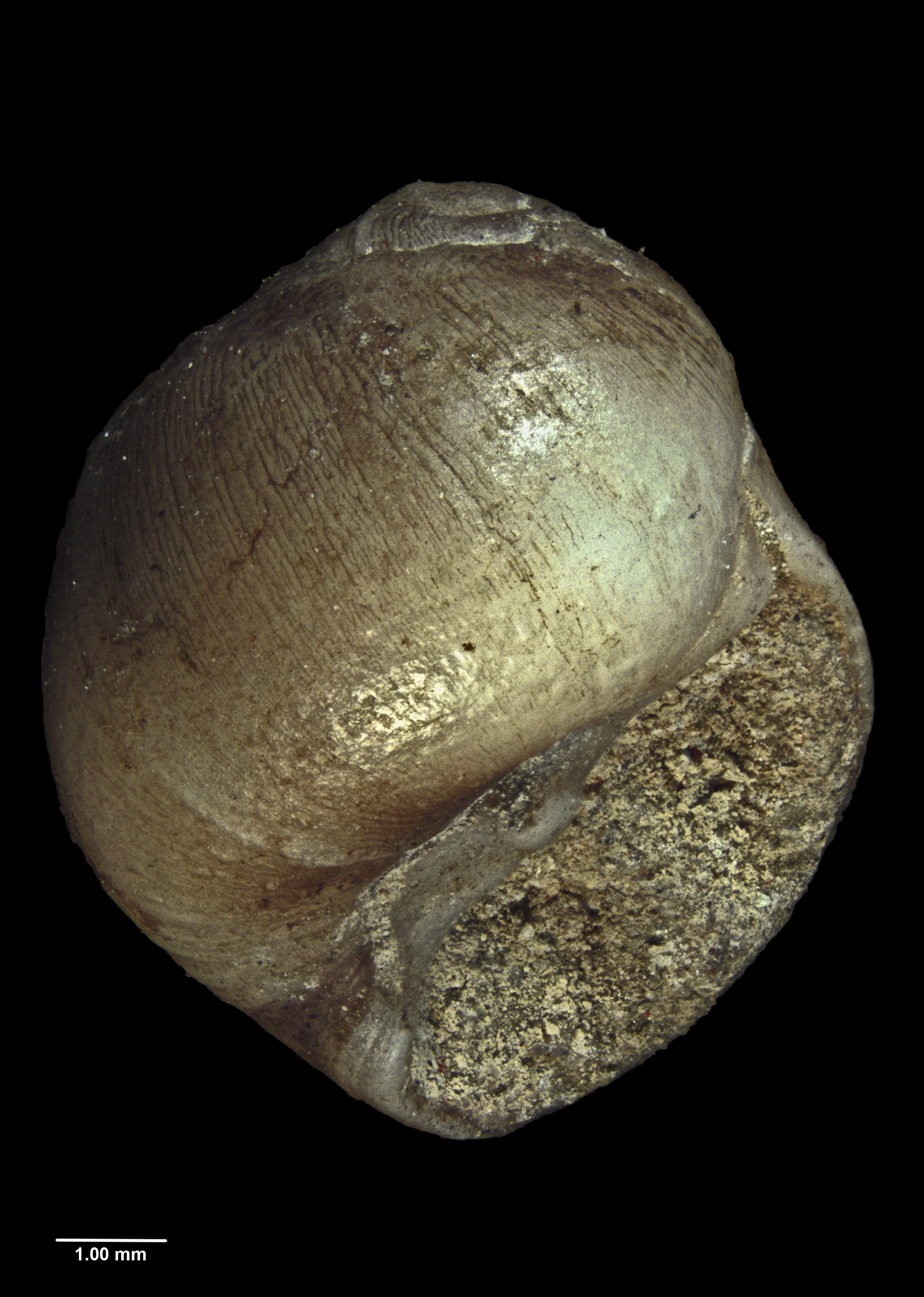
- Holotype from Auckland War Memorial Museum

Scientific classification
- Kingdom: Animalia
- Phylum: Mollusca
- Class: Gastropoda
- Subclass: Caenogastropoda
- Order: Littorinimorpha
- Family: Naticidae
- Genus: †Taniella
- Species: †T. motutaraensis

Binomial name
- †Taniella motutaraensis (A. W. B. Powell, 1935)

Synonyms
- Polinices motutaraensis A. W. B. Powell, 1935; Pristinacca motutaraensis (A. W. B. Powell, 1935); Taniella (Pristinacca) motutaraensis (A. W. B. Powell, 1935); Taniella (Taniella) motutaraensis (A. W. B. Powell, 1935)

= Taniella motutaraensis =

Taniella motutaraensis Temporal range: early Miocene

Extinct species of gastropod

Taniella motutaraensis is an extinct species of sea snail, a marine gastropod mollusc, in the family Naticidae. Fossils of the species date to early Miocene strata of the west coast of the Auckland Region, New Zealand.

== Description ==
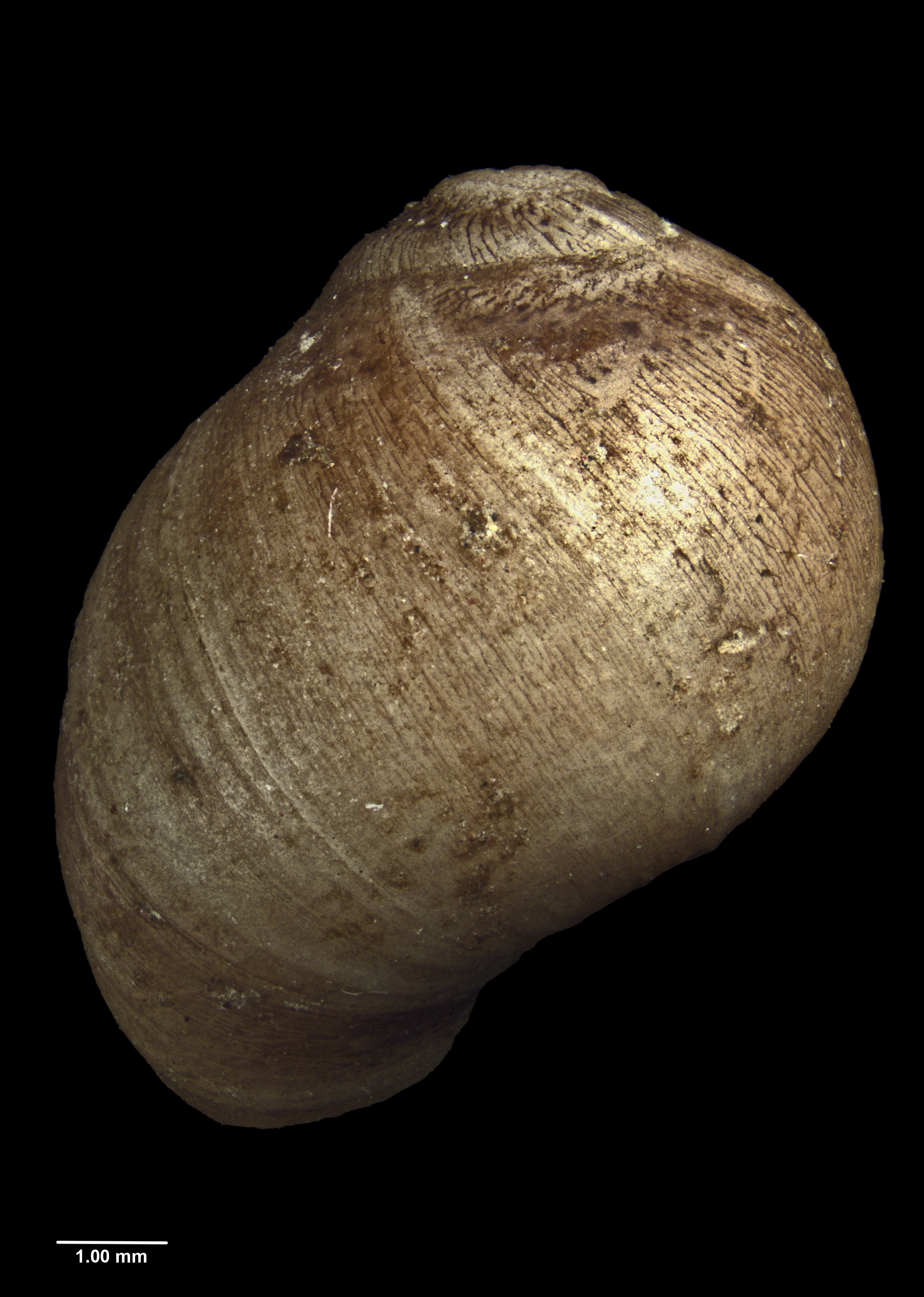
Reverse view of holotype

In the original description, Powell described the species as follows:

Shell small, solid, oval, smooth except for numerous axial growth lines. Whorls 4 2/4, including a protoconch not clearly marked off, but with a tiny nucleus, and probably about 2 1/2 whorls. Spire blunt, broadly rounded, about one-fifth the height of aperture (suture to basal lip). Suture tangential. Parietal callus peculiar, fairly heavy, widest below as it is coalescent with the funicle, completely filling the umbilicus. The medial part of the callus is surmounted by a prominent tubercle, and the outer edge is bounded by a shallow groove. Basal lip much thickened, especially at the point of contact with the umbilical callus.

The holotype of the species measures 8.9 mm (0.35 in) in height and 7.5 mm (0.30 in) in diameter. The species can be identified due to having a prominent tubercule on its parietal callus, as well as the umbilicus being completely filled.

== Taxonomy ==
The species was first described by A. W. B. Powell in 1935 as Polinices motutaraensis. It was moved to the Taniella subgenus Pristinacca in 1966 by Charles Alexander Fleming. Its currently accepted name is Taniella motutaraensis, without a subgenus.

The holotype was collected at an unknown date prior to 1935 from the southern end of Maukatia Bay, south of Muriwai, Auckland Region (then more commonly known as Motutara), and is held in the collections of Auckland War Memorial Museum.

== Distribution ==
This extinct marine species occurs in early Miocene strata of the Nihotupu Formation of New Zealand, on the west coast of the Waitākere Ranges of the Auckland Region, New Zealand. The Powell Bay site deposits of the Nihotupu Formation in the western Waitākere Ranges are mid-bathyal 800–2,000 m (2,600–6,600 ft).
