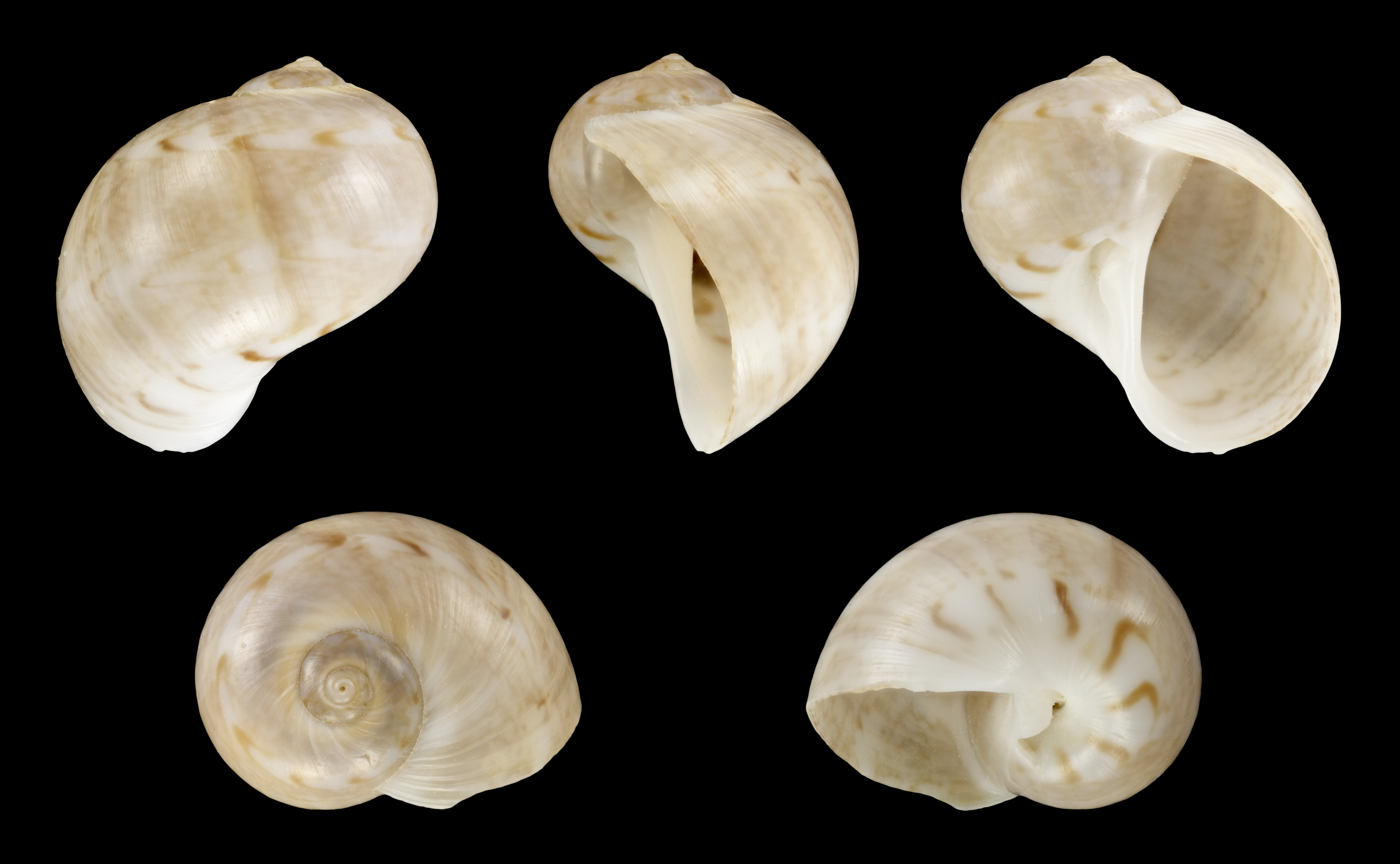

Scientific classification
- Kingdom: Animalia
- Phylum: Mollusca
- Class: Gastropoda
- Subclass: Caenogastropoda
- Order: Littorinimorpha
- Family: Naticidae
- Genus: Notocochlis
- Species: N. dillwynii

Binomial name
- Notocochlis dillwynii (Payraudeau, 1826)

Synonyms
- Nacca fasciata Risso, 1826; Natica dillwynii Payraudeau, 1826 (original combination); Natica dillwynii var. efasciata Pallary, 1900; Tectonatica operculata farolita F. Nordsieck, 1973

= Notocochlis dillwynii =

Species of gastropod

Notocochlis dillwynii is a species of predatory sea snail, a marine gastropod mollusk in the family Naticidae, the moon snails.

== Distribution ==
This marine species occurs in European waters, the Atlantic Ocean off the Cape Verdes and the Canary Islands; in the Mediterranean Sea.
