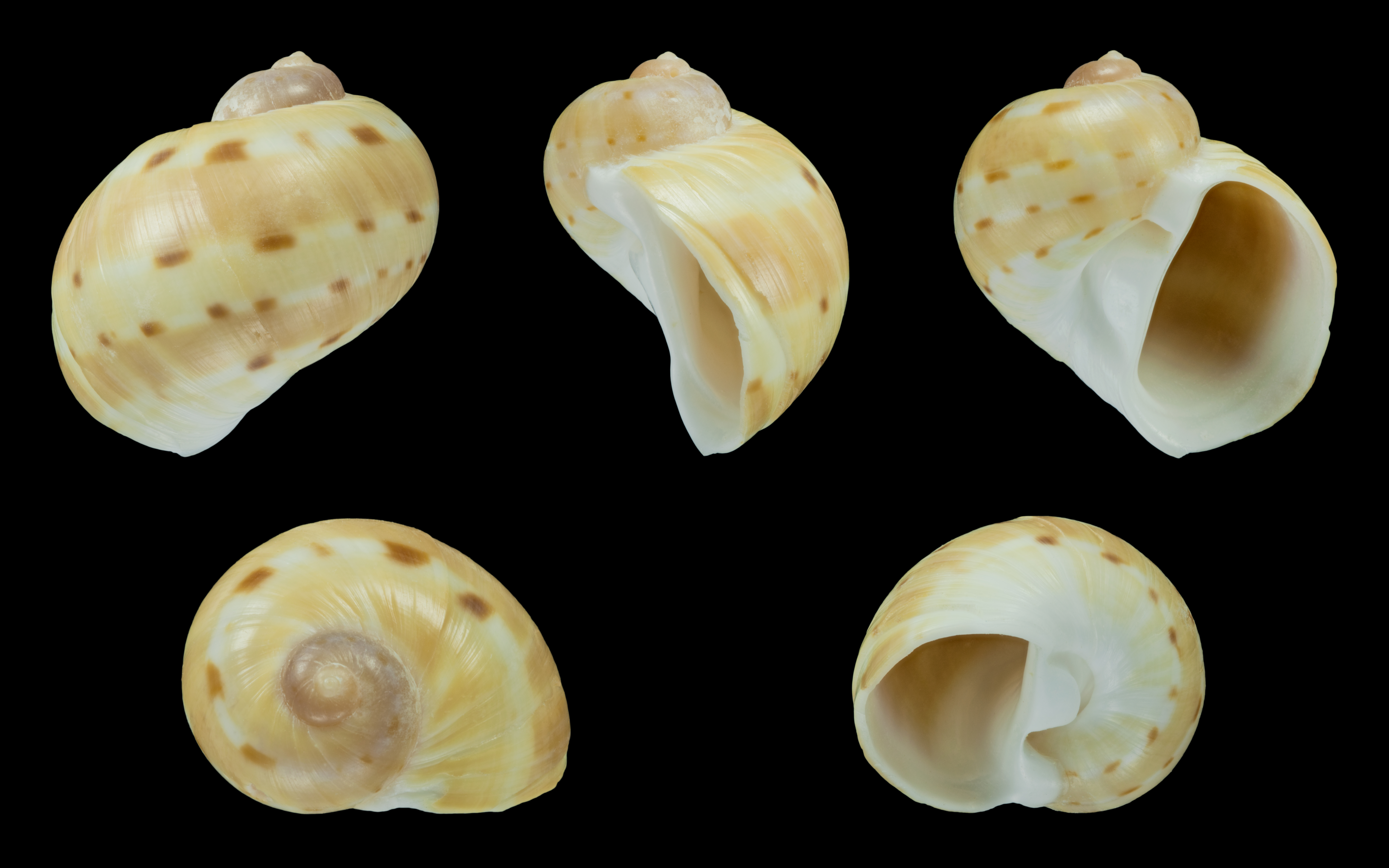
- Shell of Glyphepithema floridana

Scientific classification
- Kingdom: Animalia
- Phylum: Mollusca
- Class: Gastropoda
- Subclass: Caenogastropoda
- Order: Littorinimorpha
- Family: Naticidae
- Genus: Glyphepithema
- Species: G. floridana

Binomial name
- Glyphepithema floridana Rehder, 1943

Synonyms
- Natica (Glyphepithema) bayeri Rehder, 1986 (Invalid: junior homonym of Natica bayeri Koperberg, 1931: N. tedbayeri is a replacement name); Natica (Glyphepithema) tedbayeri Rehder, 1986 junior subjective synonym

= Glyphepithema floridana =

Species of gastropod

Glyphepithema floridana is a species of predatory sea snail, a marine gastropod mollusk in the family Naticidae, the moon snails.

== Nomenclature ==
Faber (2010, Miscellanea Malacologica 4(5): 72) treated Glyphepithema as generically distinct from Natica, and thus reinstated Glyphepithema floridana as the valid name for the species also known as Natica tedbayeri.

== Description ==
When the species was first described in 1943, Rehder provided the following physical description:

The shell is globose and stout, with the body whorl very large and the spire small and conical. The nucleus consists of about two and a half whorls sculptured with microscopic spiral lines. The subsequent postnuclear whorls are smooth, except for rather deep, retractively slanting axial grooves that extend only to the shoulder. These postnuclear whorls are covered by a fairly persistent yellowish-brown periostracum, which is axially wrinkled by parallel, riblet-like folds that are especially strong near the suture and extend towards the umbilical region.

Four bands of fairly regular, distantly spaced, oblong chestnut spots on a white ground encircle the body whorl: one band on the shoulder, one on the periphery, and two below the periphery. Between the first and second, and between the third and fourth bands, there are brown bands, the upper of which is broader than the lower; the remaining ground colour of the shell is yellowish white. A moderately broad funicle occupies the umbilicus and terminates in a heavy white callous pad. The aperture is semicircular.

The operculum has a smooth, somewhat concave nuclear callus that is elevated toward the outer edge (away from the columellar side). This is followed by a broad, rounded rib and then a narrower rounded rib. After a straight-sided, rather wide interspace, there is a rib that is joined at its top to the next two thin lamellae by an irregular calcareous deposit, formed of fused radial elements that are swollen over the first thin lamella. At the marginal edge, this deposit is pinched up into an irregularly nodulose crest.

The maximum recorded shell length is 22 mm (0.87 in).

== Habitat ==
The species' recorded depths range between 0 and 50 m (0 and 164 ft).
