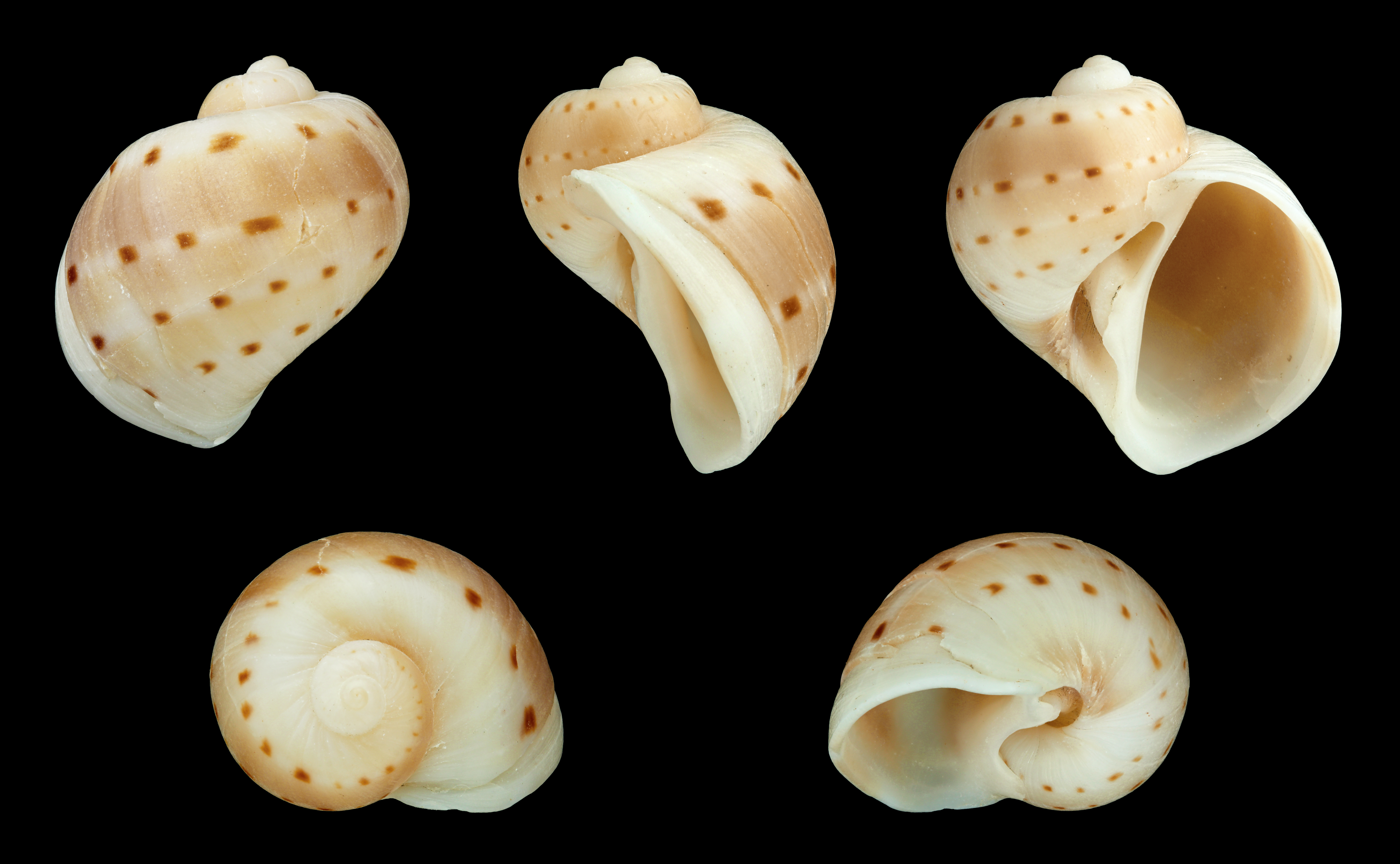
- Glyphepithema alapapilionis

Scientific classification
- Kingdom: Animalia
- Phylum: Mollusca
- Class: Gastropoda
- Subclass: Caenogastropoda
- Order: Littorinimorpha
- Family: Naticidae
- Genus: Glyphepithema
- Species: G. alapapilionis

Binomial name
- Glyphepithema alapapilionis (Röding, 1798)

Synonyms
- Cochlis alapapilionis Röding, 1798 superseded combination; Natica alapapilionis (Röding, 1798); Natica (Naticarius) alapapilionis (Roding, 1798) superseded combination; Natica articulata R. A. Philippi, 1852 junior subjective synonym; Natica crenata Récluz, 1853 junior homonym (of Natica crenata Zekeli, 1852); Natica plicifera R. A. Philippi, 1852 junior subjective synonym; Natica sagittifera Récluz, 1852; Natica taeniata Menke, 1830; Natica zonaria Lamarck, 1816 junior subjective synonym; Naticarius alapapilionis (Röding, 1798) superseded combination; Quantonatica alapapilionis (Röding, 1798) superseded combination

= Glyphepithema alapapilionis =

Species of gastropod

Glyphepithema alapapilionis, common name butterfly-wing sand shell, is a species of predatory sea snail, a marine gastropod mollusk in the family Naticidae, the moon snails.

== Description ==
The length of the shell attains 28 mm, its diameter 27 mm.

(Described in French as Natica crenata) The shell is oval, conical, and ventrose, and is composed of five whorls, of which the body whorl is much larger than all the others combined. This body whorl shows alternately rusty-yellow, white, and brownish-maroon bands. These zones are unequal in width; the white bands that border the brown ones are articulated with transverse, elongate-square blotches of maroon. Seen from a little distance, this pattern gives the brown bands the appearance of gear wheels.

The whorls, though slightly convex in their upper part, appear almost staged or turreted. The spire is prominent, conical, and staged; the brown band, edged with dots of the same colour, winds around it up to the summit, which is acute. The aperture is very oblique, semicircular, white at the entrance, and purplish within. The inner lip is obliquely straight and bears anteriorly a groove formed by the pressure of the calcareous operculum; the lip of the operculum is short and only weakly reflected over the penultimate whorl.

The umbilicus is large and open only in its upper part, as in all funiculate Natica species, and it is blocked in its lower portion by a fairly broad funicle with a depressed surface and a summit cut off squarely. The operculum is calcareous but otherwise remains insufficiently known.

== Distribution ==
This species widely occurs in the Indo-West Pacific, as off the Mascarenes; also off Australia (New South Wales, Queensland).
