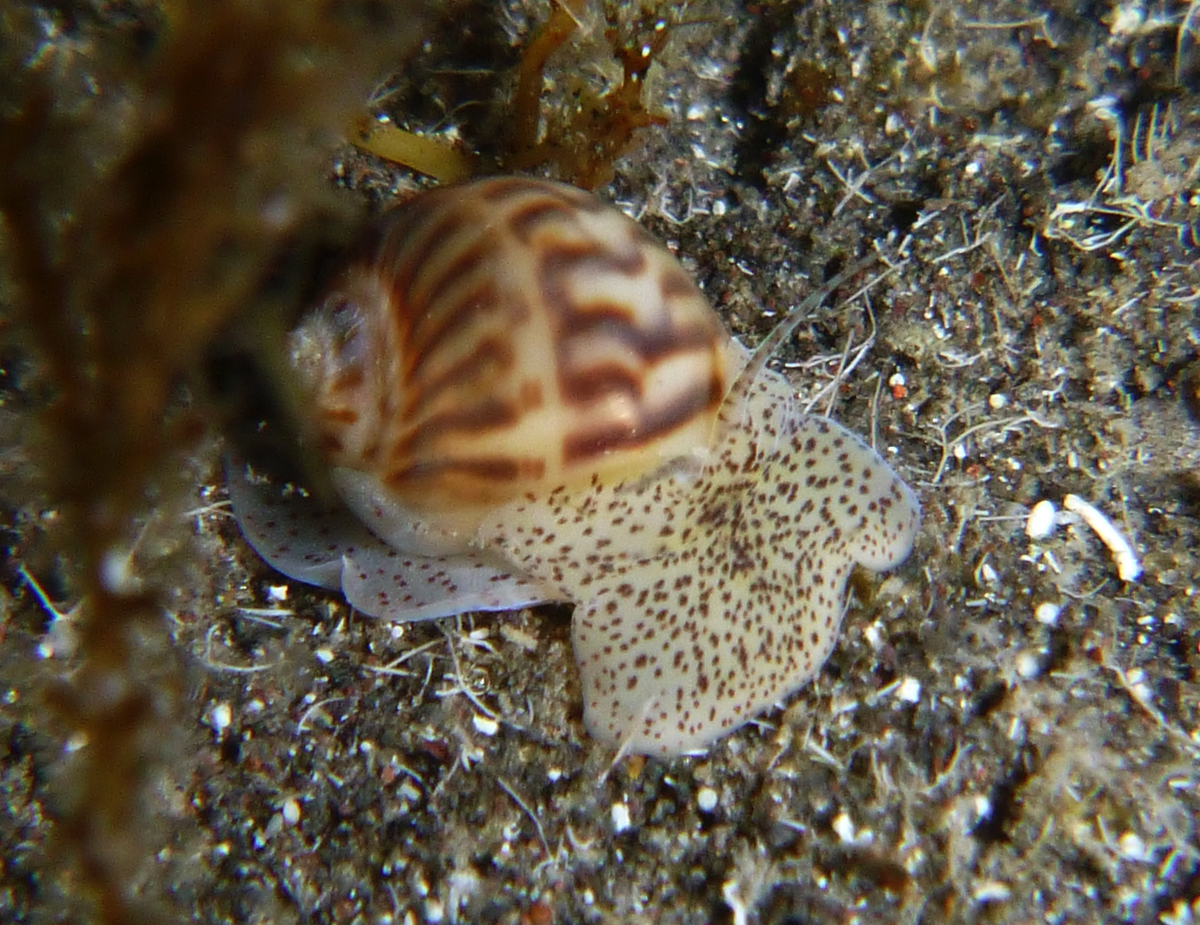

Scientific classification
- Kingdom: Animalia
- Phylum: Mollusca
- Class: Gastropoda
- Subclass: Caenogastropoda
- Order: Littorinimorpha
- Family: Naticidae
- Genus: Notocochlis
- Species: N. gualteriana

Binomial name
- Notocochlis gualteriana Récluz, 1844

Synonyms
- Cochlis migratoria Powell, 1927; Cochlis vafer Finlay, 1930; Natica (Notocochlis) gualteriana Recluz, 1844; Natica (Notocochlis) migratoria (Powell, 1927); Natica (Polinices) burnupi E. A. Smith, 1903; Natica antoni Philippi, 1851; Natica asellus Reeve, 1855; Natica avellana Philippi, 1852; Natica balteata G.B. Sowerby III, 1914; Natica burnupi E.A. Smith, 1903; Natica gualteriana Récluz, 1844 (basionym); Natica gualtieriana f. burnupi E. A. Smith, 1903; Natica locellus Reeve, 1855; Natica nemo Bartsch, 1915; Natica tessellata Philippi, 1849; Natica venustula Philippi, 1851 (original combination); Notocochlis antoni (Philippi, 1851); Notocochlis migratoria (Powell, 1927); Notocochlis venustula (Philippi, 1851); Polinices parvulus Bozzetti, 2010; Tectonatica venustula (Philippi, 1851)

= Notocochlis gualteriana =

Species of gastropod

Notocochlis gualteriana, common name the comma necklace shell, is a species of predatory sea snail, a marine gastropod mollusk in the family Naticidae, the moon snails.

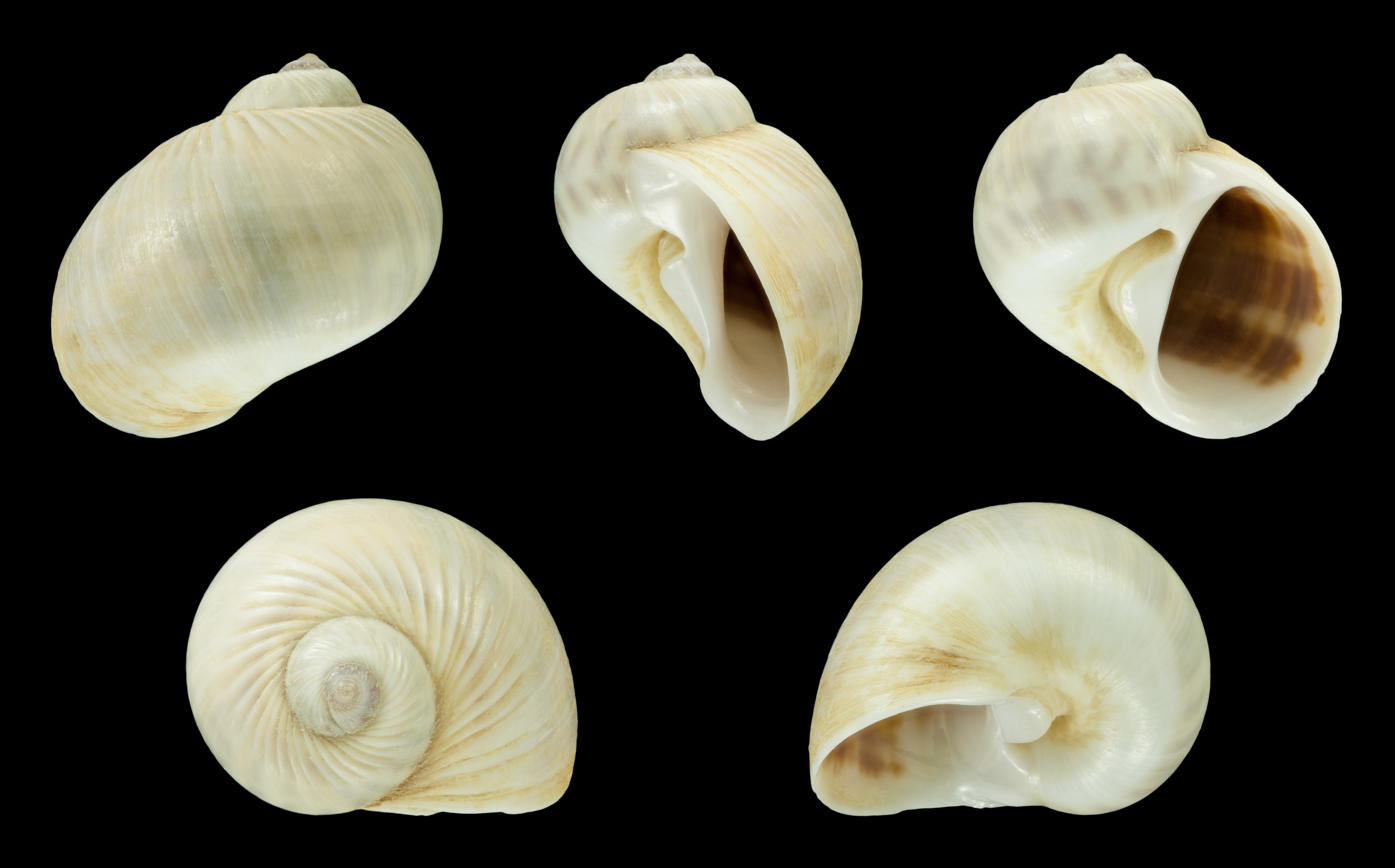
Shell

== Description ==
The shell is moderately small, 8–25 mm in height, solid, with a moderately elevated spire that is sculptured with axial growth striae and radial ribs at the sutures. It is white in colour and variously maculated with grey or brown, straight or curved streaks, which are generally arranged in two to three spiral zones on the body whorl; in some specimens the shell is dark greyish brown, with the streaks becoming confluent.

The aperture is semi-ovate and is maculated with brown within. The funicle is prominent and variable in thickness, axially elongate or rounded, and either extends vertically into the umbilicus or winds sideways; the umbilicus is open or only partly covered. The periostracum is thin, brown, and moderately translucent.

The operculum is calcareous, white, and bears a single marginal rib. The rachidian tooth of the radula (Fig. 21) is tricuspid, with two basal cusps mounted on a shield; the lateral tooth has seven cusps, the inner marginal tooth is bifid, and the outer marginal tooth is simple.

== Distribution ==
This species occurs in European waters, the Mediterranean Sea, the Indian Ocean off Aldabra, the Masacarene Basin, Kenya, Tanzania, Madagascar, Mozambique, South Africa, and off the Philippines, China, South Korea and New Zealand.
