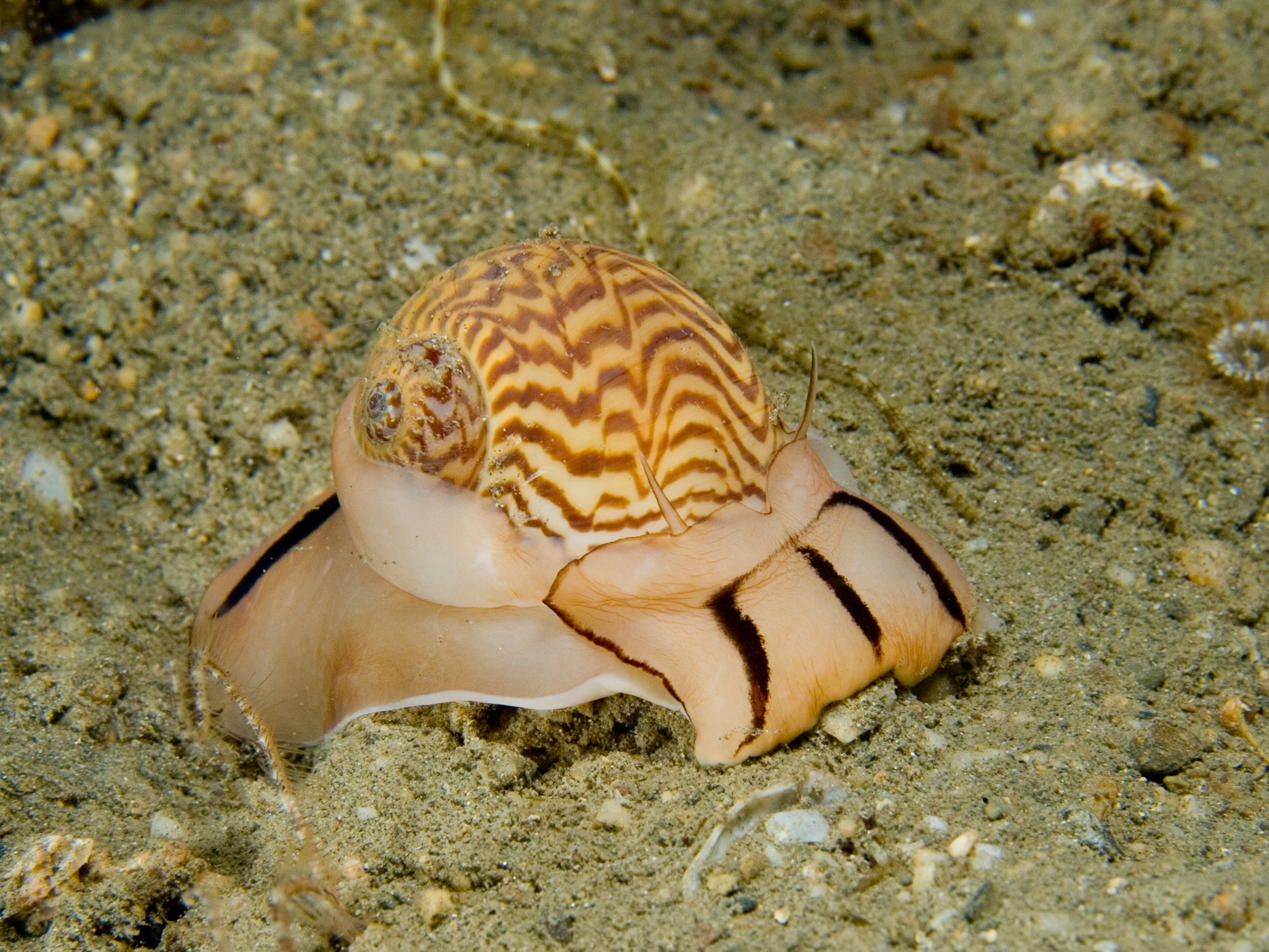
- A live individual of Tanea undulata from East Timor

Scientific classification
- Kingdom: Animalia
- Phylum: Mollusca
- Class: Gastropoda
- Subclass: Caenogastropoda
- Order: Littorinimorpha
- Family: Naticidae
- Genus: Tanea
- Species: T. undulata

Binomial name
- Tanea undulata (Röding, 1798)

Synonyms
- Cochlis undulata Röding, 1798 (basionym); Natica euzona Récluz, 1844; Natica undulata; Natica zebra Lamarck, 1822; Tanea euzona (Récluz, 1844) ·

= Tanea undulata =

Species of gastropod

Tanea undulata, common name the necklace shell, is a species of medium-sized sea snail, a predatory marine gastropod mollusc in the Family Naticidae, the moon snails or necklace shells.
