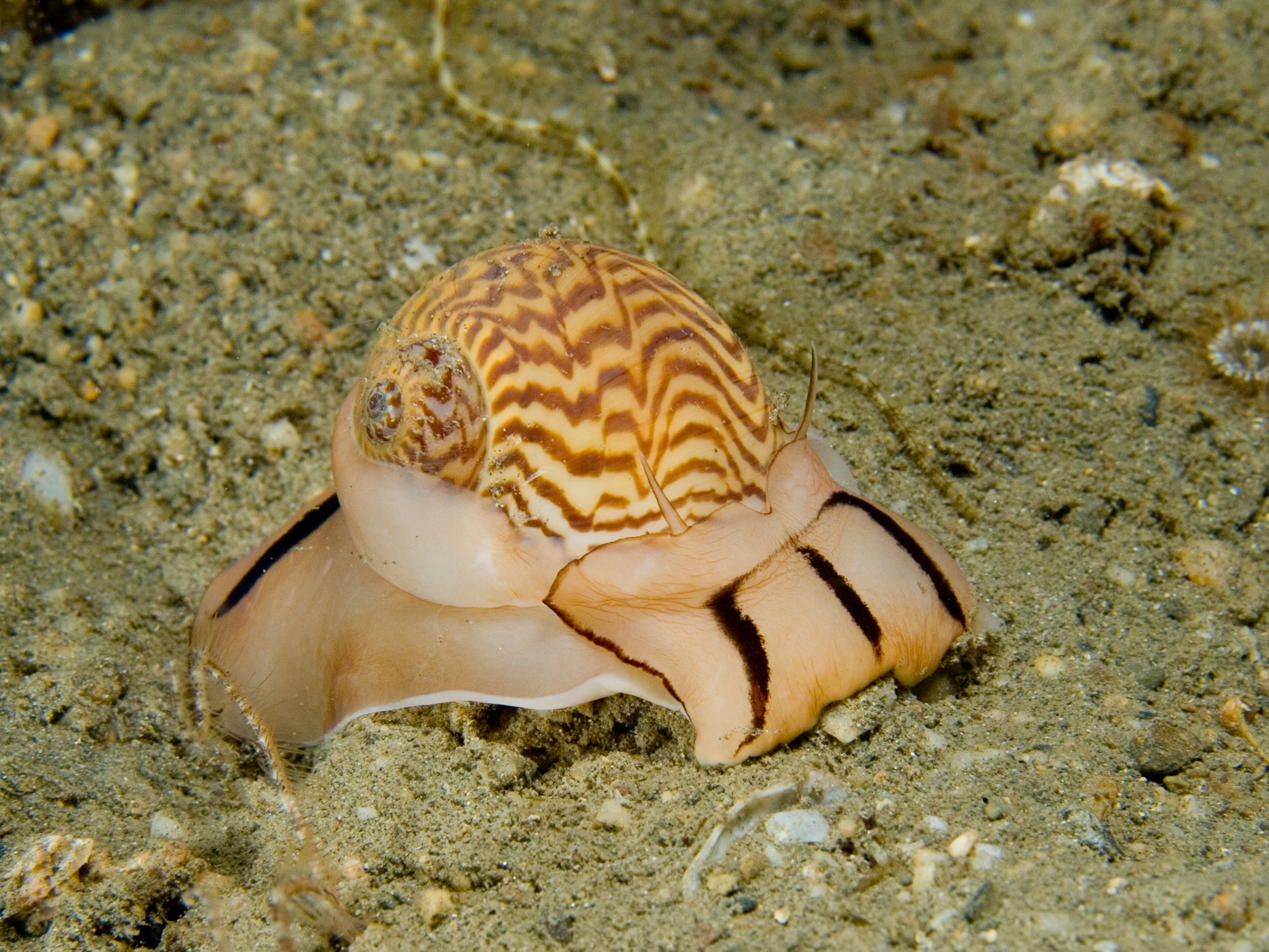
- Live Tanea undulata from East Timor

Scientific classification
- Kingdom: Animalia
- Phylum: Mollusca
- Class: Gastropoda
- Subclass: Caenogastropoda
- Order: Littorinimorpha
- Superfamily: Naticoidea
- Family: Naticidae
- Subfamily: Naticinae
- Genus: Tanea; Marwick, 1931

Type species
- Natica zelandica Quoy & Gaimard, 1832

= Tanea =

Genus of gastropods

Tanea is a genus of sea snails, marine gastropod molluscs in the subfamily Naticinae ( of the family Naticidae, the moon snails or necklace shells.

== Species ==
Species within the genus Tanea include:

- Tanea albifasciata (X. Liu, 1977)
- Tanea areolata (Récluz, 1844)
- †Tanea consortis (Finlay, 1924)
- †Tanea hamiltonensis (Tenison Woods, 1879)
- Tanea hilaris (G.B.Sowerby III, 1914)
- Tanea hollmanni Poppe, Tagaro & Stahlschmidt, 2015
- †Tanea inexpectata (Finlay, 1924)
- Tanea lineata (Röding, 1798)
- Tanea magnifluctuata (Kuroda, 1961)
- Tanea mozaica (Sowerby, 1833)
- Tanea pavimentum (Récluz, 1844)
- Tanea picta (Récluz, 1844)
- †Tanea pittensis (Marwick, 1928)
- †Tanea praeconsors (Finlay, 1924)
- Tanea sagittata (Menke, 1843)
- Tanea shoichiroi (Kuroda, 1961)
- †Tanea sublata (Marwick, 1924)
- Tanea tabularis (Kuroda, 1961)
- Tanea tenuipicta (Kuroda, 1961)
- Tanea tosaensis (Kuroda, 1961)
- Tanea undulata (Röding, P.F., 1798)
- Tanea zelandica (Quoy and Gaimard, 1832

Species brought into synonymy

- Tanea acinonyx (March-Marchad, 1956) : synonym of Natica acinonyx Marche-Marchad, 1957
- Tanea euzona (Récluz, 1844): synonym of Tanea undulata (Röding, 1798)
- Tanea euzona magnifluctuata (Kuroda, 1961): synonym of Tanea magnifluctuata (Kuroda, 1961)
- Tanea lemniscata (Philippi, 1853 in 1849–53): synonym of Natica marochiensis (Gmelin, 1791)
- Tanea luculenta Iredale, 1929: synonym of Natica luculenta Iredale, 1929
- Tanea pluvialis Kurono, 1999: synonym of Natica pluvialis (Kurono, 1999)
- † Tanea socia (Finlay, 1927): synonym of † Tanea consortis (Finlay, 1924)

== Gallery ==
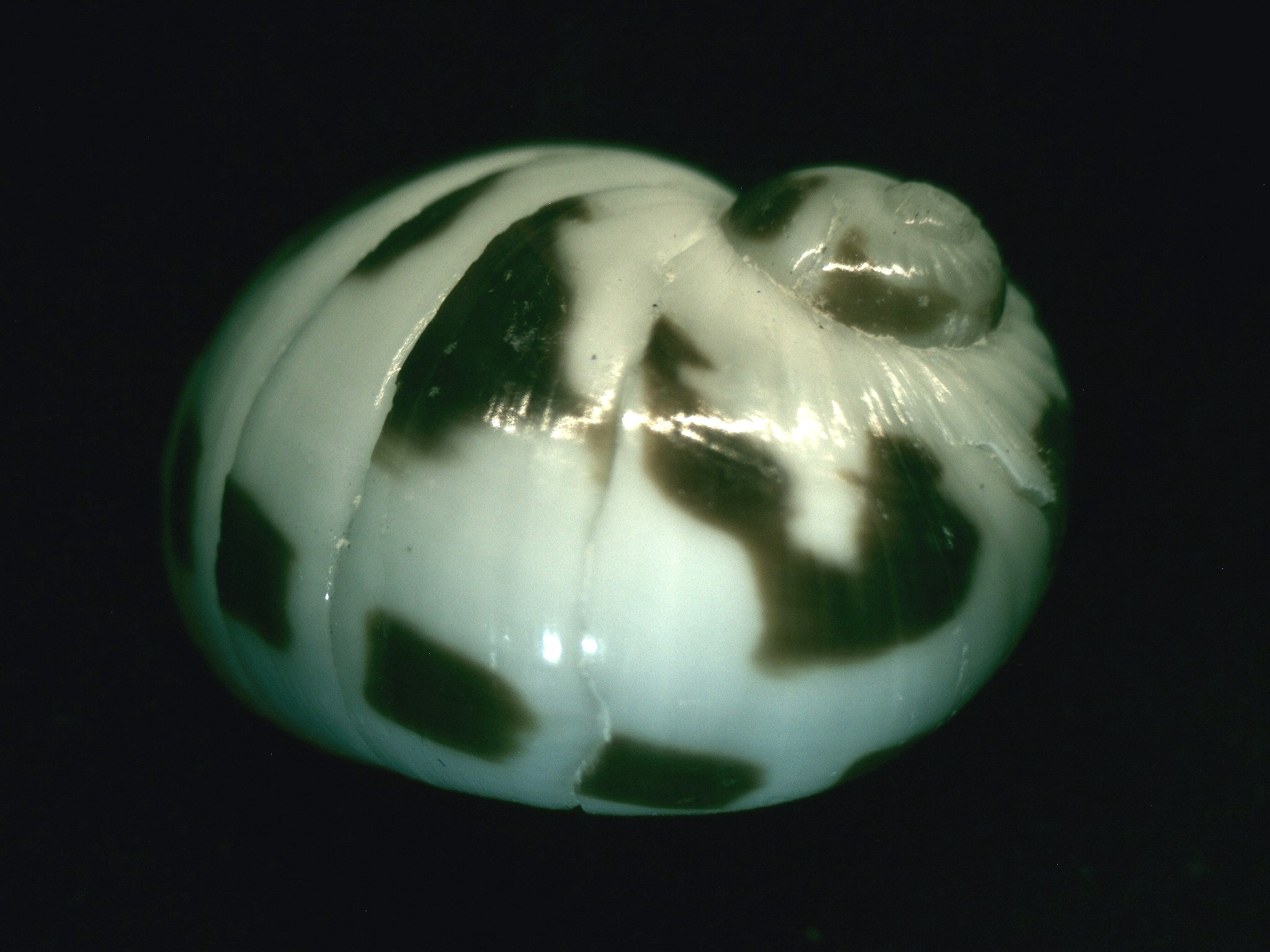
Tanea pavimentum

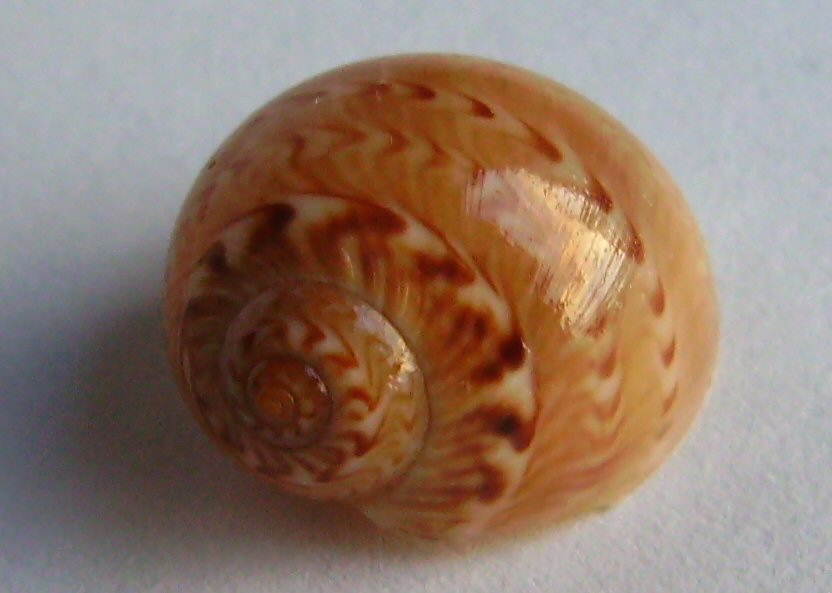
A shell of Tanea zelandica

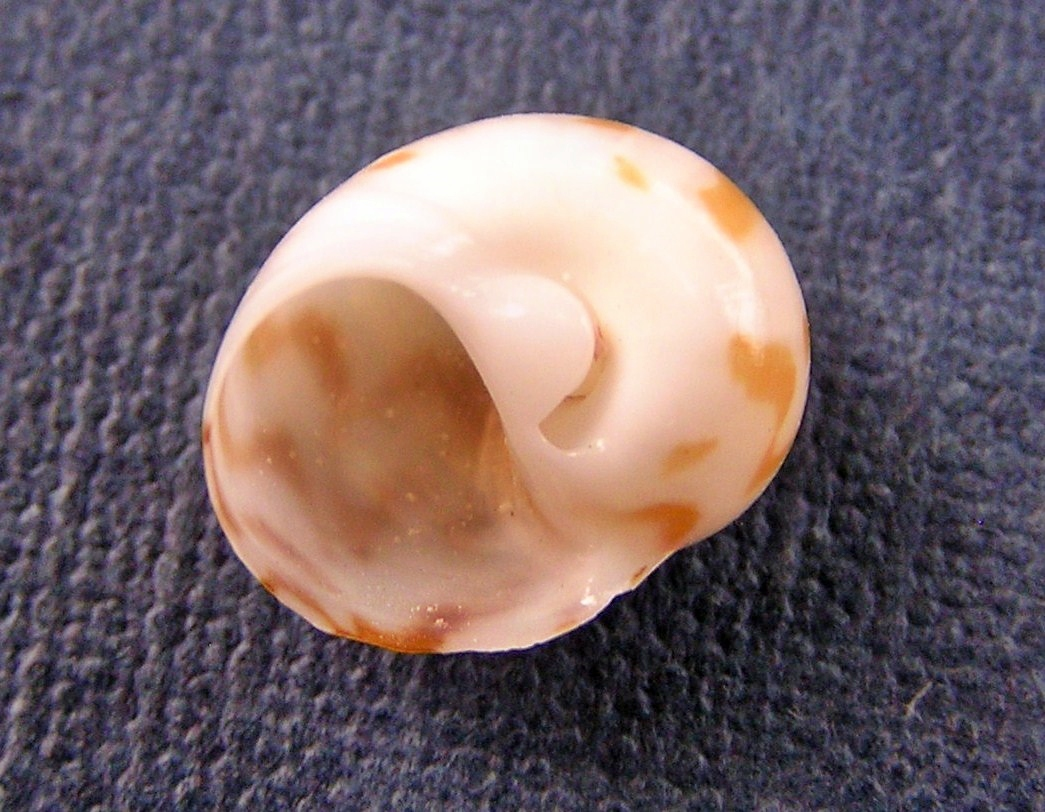
Tanea undulata, apertural view

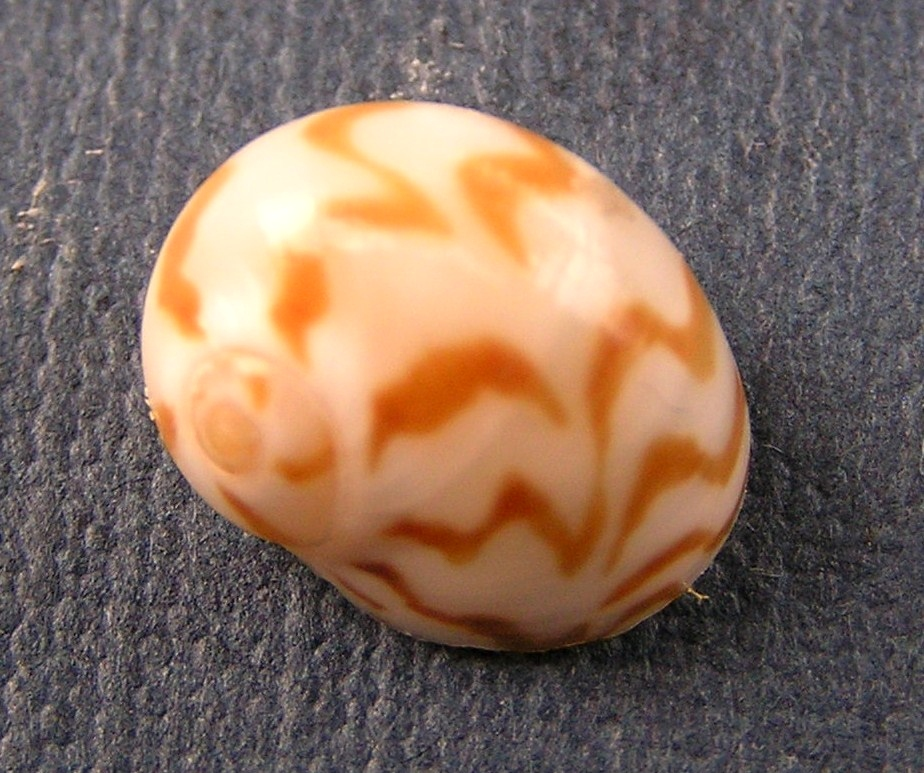
Tanea undulata, abapertural view
