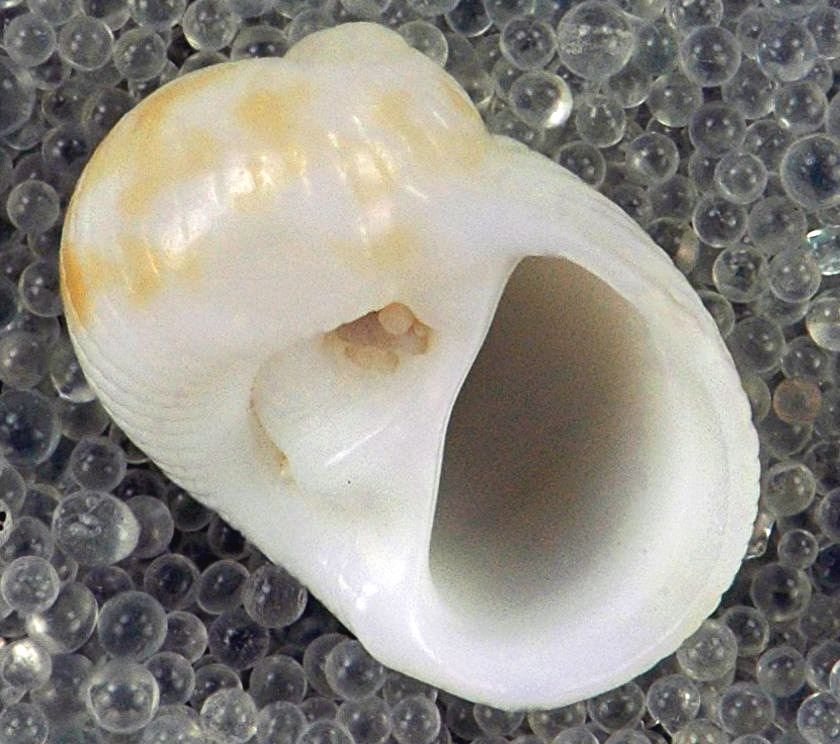

Scientific classification
- Kingdom: Animalia
- Phylum: Mollusca
- Class: Gastropoda
- Subclass: Caenogastropoda
- Order: Littorinimorpha
- Family: Naticidae
- Genus: Stigmaulax
- Species: S. sulcatus

Binomial name
- Stigmaulax sulcatus (Born, 1778)

= Stigmaulax sulcatus =

Species of gastropod

Stigmaulax sulcatus is a species of predatory sea snail, a marine gastropod mollusc in the family Naticidae, the moon snails.

== Distribution ==
An uncommon species -Western Atlantic sources

== Description ==
The maximum recorded shell length is 38 mm.

== Habitat ==
Minimum recorded depth is 0 m. Maximum recorded depth is 44 m. Dredged at 150+ metres depth, off Barbados.
