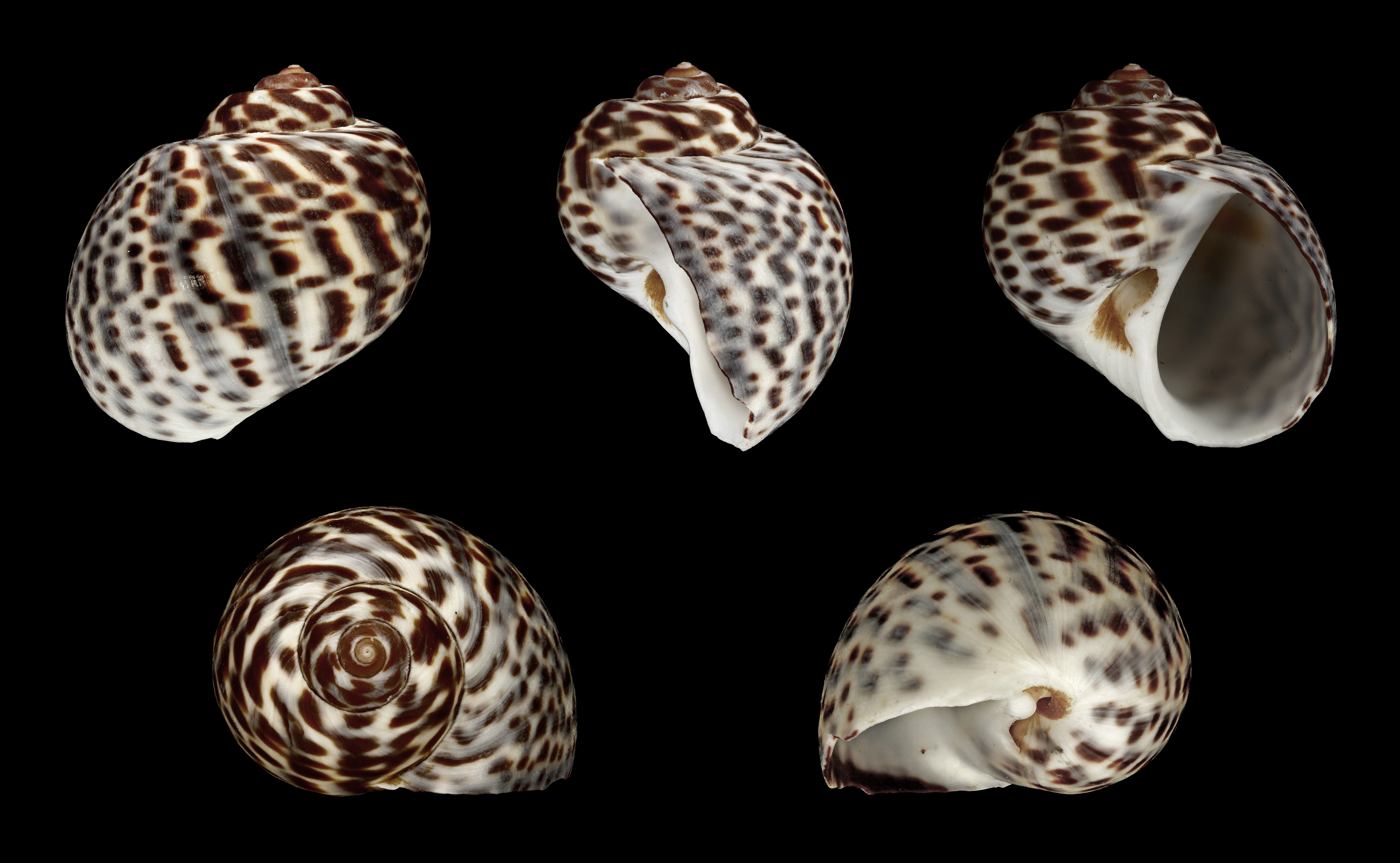
- Five views of a shell of Paratectonatica tigrina
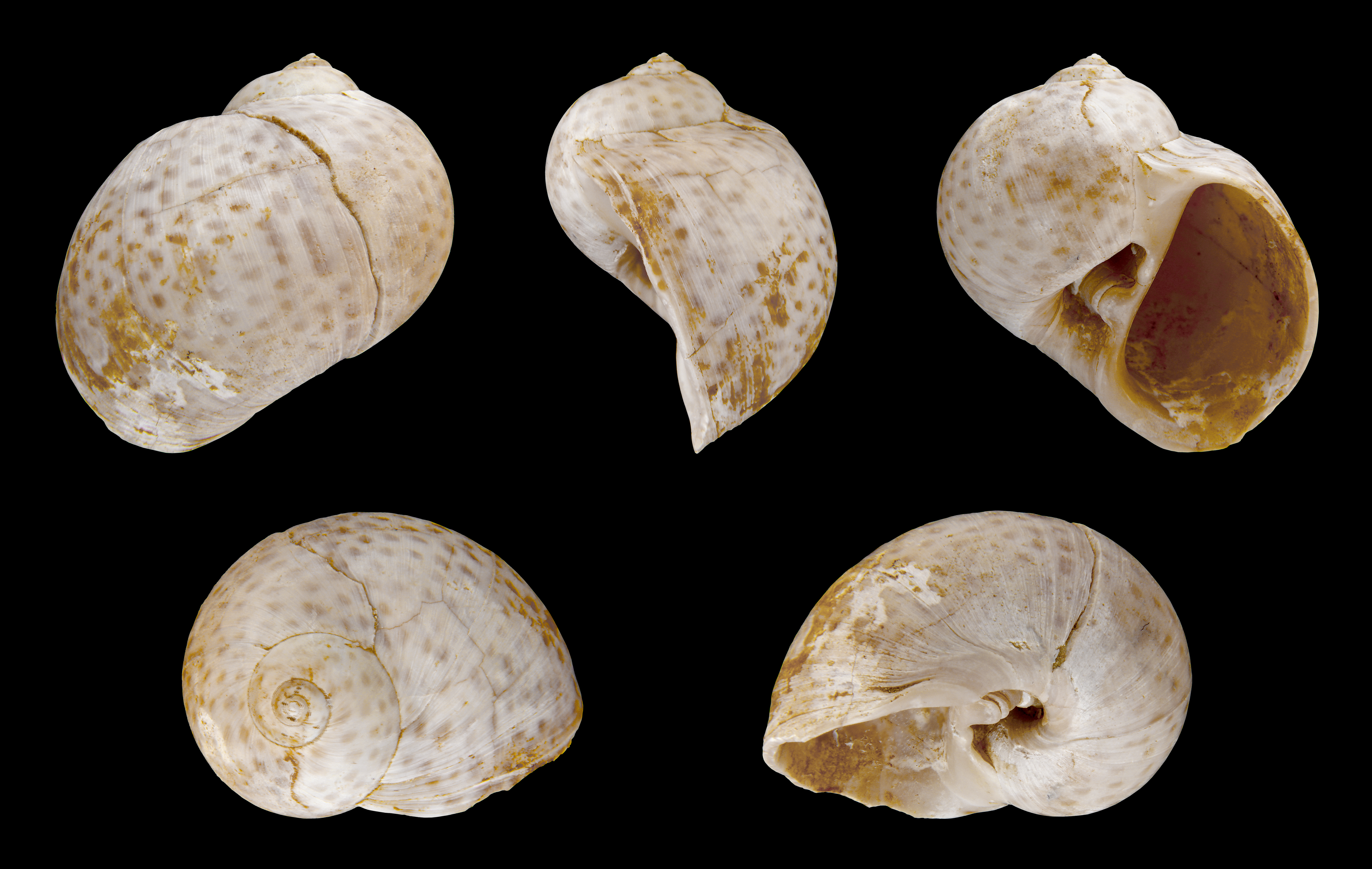
- Five views of a fossil shell of Paratectonatica tigrina from the Pliocene of Bibbiano, Tuscany, Italy

Scientific classification
- Kingdom: Animalia
- Phylum: Mollusca
- Class: Gastropoda
- Subclass: Caenogastropoda
- Order: Littorinimorpha
- Family: Naticidae
- Genus: Paratectonatica
- Species: P. tigrina

Binomial name
- Paratectonatica tigrina (Röding, 1798)

Synonyms
- Cochlis tigrina Röding, 1798 (original combination); Natica javanica Lamarck, 1822; Natica maculata Perry, 1811 (invalid: junior homonym of Natica maculata von Salis, 1793); Natica maculosa Lamarck, 1822; Natica pellistigrina Deshayes, 1838; Natica tigrina (Röding, 1798); Notocochlis tigrina (Röding, 1798)

= Paratectonatica tigrina =

Paratectonatica tigrina Temporal range: Oligocene - Recent

Species of gastropod

Paratectonatica tigrina, common name tiger moon snail, is a species of predatory sea snail, a marine gastropod mollusk in the family Naticidae, the moon snails.

== Description ==
Size 28-30mm, with slightly elevated spires. Pale brown colour with faint brown or yellow trans-spiral lines. Commonly crawls on sandy bottom in meso littoral zone.

Shells of Paratectonatica tigrina can reach a size of 20–40 millimetres (0.79–1.57 in). These shells are pear-shaped and quite thick, with the tip of the spiral sticking out. They have a whitish or pale brown surface with small dark brown or black spots. Operculum is white and quite smooth, usually with yellow and gray patches. The foot of the mollusk is whitish, almost translucent, plain and large.

== Distribution ==
This species occurs in the Red Sea and in the Indian Ocean off Madagascar. They are also commonly found along the Southeast Indian coast and the Konkan coast up to Kerala.

Paratectonatica tigrina can be found in the Eastern Africa, Southeastern Asia and Australia.

== Human uses ==
In some countries (mainly Indonesia and Japan) these sea snails are collected for food and the shells are traded.

== Fossil records ==
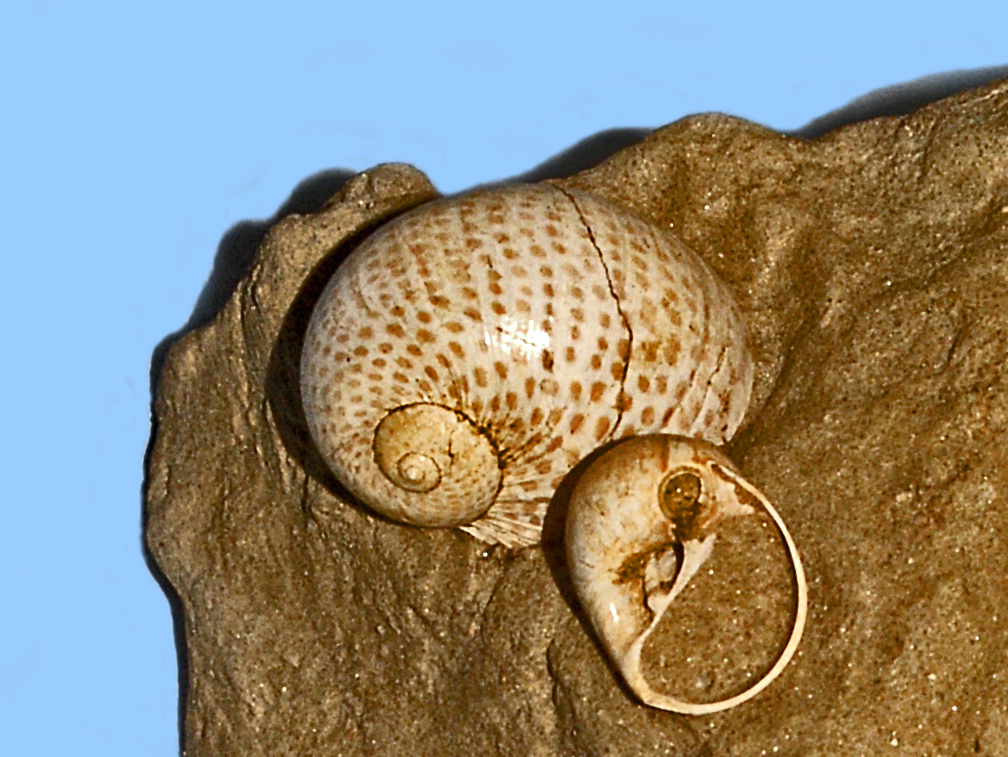
Fossil of Paratectonatica tigrina from Pliocene of Italy

This species is known in the fossil record from the Oligocene epoch to the Quaternary period (age range 23.03 to 0.0 million years ago.). Fossils have been collected in the sediments of Austria, Germany, India, Italy and Thailand.
