= N. orientalis =

N. orientalis may refer to:

- Naticarius orientalis, a predatory sea snail species
- Nicrophorus orientalis (disambiguation), a disambiguation page
- Nocardia orientalis, now known as Amycolatopsis orientalis

== See also ==
- Orientalis (disambiguation)
