= Production of antibiotics =

Processes for manufacturing & refining antibiotics

Production of antibiotics is a naturally occurring event, that thanks to advances in science can now be replicated and improved upon in laboratory settings. Due to the discovery of penicillin by Alexander Fleming, and the efforts of Florey and Chain in 1938, large-scale, pharmaceutical production of antibiotics has been made possible. As with the initial discovery of penicillin, most antibiotics have been discovered as a result of happenstance. Antibiotic production can be grouped into three methods: natural fermentation, semi-synthetic, and synthetic. As more and more bacteria continue to develop resistance to currently produced antibiotics, research and development of new antibiotics continues to be important. In addition to research and development into the production of new antibiotics, repackaging delivery systems is important to improving efficacy of the antibiotics that are currently produced. Improvements to this field have seen the ability to add antibiotics directly into implanted devices, aerosolization of antibiotics for direct delivery, and combination of antibiotics with non antibiotics to improve outcomes. The increase of antibiotic resistant strains of pathogenic bacteria has led to an increased urgency for the funding of research and development of antibiotics and a desire for production of new and better acting antibiotics.

== Identifying useful antibiotics ==
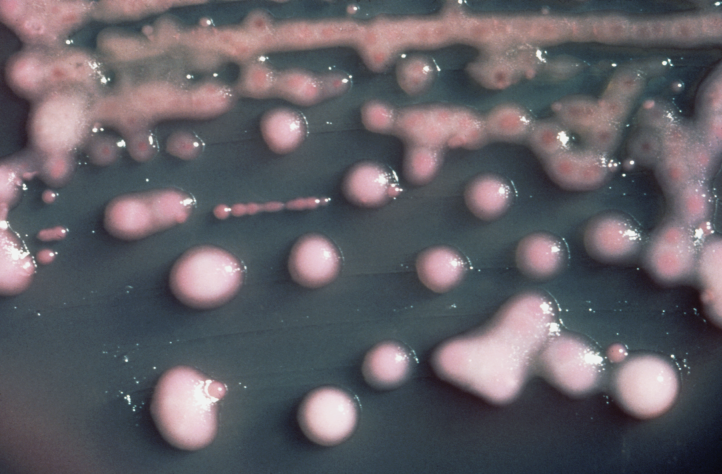
An agar plate streaked with microorganisms

Despite the wide variety of known antibiotics, less than 1% of antimicrobial agents have medical or commercial value. For example, whereas penicillin has a high therapeutic index as it does not generally affect human cells, this is not so for many antibiotics. Other antibiotics simply lack advantage over those already in use, or have no other practical applications.

Useful antibiotics are often discovered using a screening process. To conduct such a screen, isolates of many different microorganisms are cultured and then tested for production of diffusible products that inhibit the growth of test organisms. Most antibiotics identified in such a screen are already known and must therefore be disregarded. The remainder must be tested for their selective toxicities and therapeutic activities, and the best candidates can be examined and possibly modified.

A more modern version of this approach is a rational design program. This involves screening directed towards finding new natural products that inhibit a specific target, such as an enzyme only found in the target pathogen, rather than tests to show general inhibition of a culture.

Research into antibiotic identification has shown the opportunity exists to move away from lawn spotting methodology, a methodology which increases the chances of cross contamination. This new methodology involves using Lactobacillus species and shows a clear zone of inhibition as well as allowing for a determination of minimum inhibitory concentration.

== Industrial production techniques ==
=== Fermentation ===
Industrial microbiology can be used to produce antibiotics via the process of fermentation, where the source microorganism is grown in large containers (100,000–150,000 liters or more) containing a liquid growth medium. Oxygen concentration, temperature, pH and nutrient are closely controlled. As antibiotics are secondary metabolites, the population size must be controlled very carefully to ensure that maximum yield is obtained before the cells die. Once the process is complete, the antibiotic must be extracted and purified to a crystalline product. This is easier to achieve if the antibiotic is soluble in organic solvent. Otherwise it must first be removed by ion exchange, adsorption or chemical precipitation.

=== Semi-synthetic ===
A common form of antibiotic production in modern times is semi-synthetic. Semi-synthetic production of antibiotics is a combination of natural fermentation and laboratory work to maximize the antibiotic. Maximization can occur through efficacy of the drug itself, amount of antibiotics produced, and potency of the antibiotic being produced. Depending on the drug being produced and the ultimate usage of said antibiotic determines what one is attempting to produce.

An example of semi-synthetic production involves the drug ampicillin. A beta lactam antibiotic just like penicillin, ampicillin was developed by adding an addition amino group (NH_{2}) to the R group of penicillin. This additional amino group gives ampicillin a broader spectrum of use than penicillin. Methicillin is another derivative of penicillin and was discovered in the late 1950s, the key difference between penicillin and methicillin being the addition of two methoxy groups to the phenyl group. These methoxy groups allow methicillin to be used against penicillinase producing bacteria that would otherwise be resistant to penicillin.

=== Synthetic ===
Not all antibiotics are produced by bacteria; some are made completely synthetically in the lab. These include the quinolone class, of which nalidixic acid is often credited as the first to be discovered. Like other antibiotics before it the discovery of nalidixic acid has been chalked up to an accident, discovered when George Lesher was attempting to synthesize chloroquine. However a recent investigation into the origin of quinolones have discovered that a description for quinolones happened in 1949 and that patents were filed concerning quinolones some 5 years before Lesher's discovery.

== Strains used for the production ==
In the earliest years of antibiotic discovery the antibiotics being discovered were naturally produced antibiotics and were either produced by fungi, such as the antibiotic penicillin, or by soil bacteria, which can produce antibiotics including streptomycin and tetracycline.

Microorganisms used in fermentation are rarely identical to the wild type. This is because species are often genetically modified to yield the maximum amounts of antibiotics. Mutation is often used, and is encouraged by introducing mutagens such as ultraviolet radiation, x-rays or certain chemicals. Selection and further reproduction of the higher yielding strains over many generations can raise yields by 20-fold or more. Another technique used to increase yields is gene amplification, where copies of genes coding for enzymes involved in the antibiotic production can be inserted back into a cell, via vectors such as plasmids. This process must be closely linked with retesting of antibiotic production.

Some antibiotics are produced naturally by fungi. These include the cephalosporin producing Acremonium chrysogenum.

Geldanamycin is produced by Streptomyces hygroscopicus.

Erythromycin is produced by what was called Streptomyces erythreus and is now known as Saccharopolyspora erythraea.

Streptomycin is produced by Streptomyces griseus.

Tetracycline is produced by Streptomyces aureofaciens

Vancomycin is produced by Streptomyces orientalis, now known as Amycolatopsis orientalis.

== Advancements ==
Penicillin was the first of the antibiotics to be discovered. After the discovery there was the issue of taking the raw naturally produced penicillin and developing a method so that wide-scale production of a clinically significant antibiotic could occur. Over the course of many years a team led by Florey and Chain and based in Oxford was able to successfully purify, concentrate, and produce the antibiotic.

Advances in scientific technology have not always led to better conditions for the production of antibiotics. Since 1987 there have been no new classes of antibiotics discovered for industrial production and widespread usage. However new developments in genomic sequencing and technology have led to improvements and discovery in the field of antibiotic production. Genomic engineering of antibiotic gene clusters has already been shown to lead to an increase in production of different antibiotics.

== Antibiotic production and delivery method ==
Antibiotics do not render themselves fully functional and deliverable simply by being produced. Often modifications must be made to the antibiotics so that maximum efficiency is attained. Post-production modifications include making antibiotics aerosolized so as to bypass doing unnecessary damage to bacteria located in other parts of the body and instead going directly to the lungs. Nosocomial infections can lead to serious complications during and in the recovery following surgery or a hospital stay in general. By merging surgical implants with antibiotics, healthcare providers are able to strike at a specific high risk area of infection without having to use a body wide size dosage of antibiotics.

Meropenem is an antibiotic that is delivered into the body via injection. When produced meropenem is a crystalline antibiotic, so it must be mixed in with solution before injection can occur. During this process meropenem is mixed with sodium carbonate, then diluted in water after which it can be injected.

Aerosolization of antibiotics is necessary because infections of the lung are especially troublesome, which is why direct targeting of the infection is needed. Broad spectrum antibiotics can have detrimental side effects when their action is also taken against necessary non-pathogenic bacteria residing in the human microbiome. Aerosolization is effective in bypassing the microbiome that exists in the gastrointestinal tract by directing the antibiotic directly to the lungs. This process is undertaken after the production of the antibiotic itself.

The rise of antibiotic-resistant bacteria has affected implantation of medical devices. In some cases it is no longer enough for devices to be sterile when they are implanted into an individual, now they must be proactive in fighting off bacterial infection. As such antibiotics are now being added into the surface of implanted devices as an added layer of defense against the threat of infection. One such infection is Osteomyelitis which can offer a unique challenges in treatment efforts, one novel approach has been the creation of antibiotic cement nails which can be inserted into the infected bone. First described by Paley and Herzenberg antibiotic cement nails have dual purpose, both of stabilization of the bone being treated, and prevention against post-procedure infection. Antibiotic cement nails are inserted during surgery, and are produced around the time of procedure using materials available in the operating room setting. Antibiotics are mixed in with cement filling then molded around a support anchor, often chest tubes are used to ensure proper molding. Chest tubes have the advantage of being cheap and ubiquitous and have been shown to have uniformity in the production of antibiotic cement nails. The antibiotics fill the voids within the cement matrix, and upon drying and setting can be inserted into the bone. The antibiotic has a direct contact with the area of infection and retains its properties in acting upon the infection. In addition to cement nails, antibiotic cement spacers have been used to treat and prevent osteomyelitis, and for a longer period of time. In producing the antibiotic cement material it is necessary to choose antibiotics that will be effective in this hybrid form, it has been found that antibiotics in powder form that are broad spectrum are of best use. There are recommendations for the amount of antibiotic that is used when mixing in with the cement, but industry wide guidelines have not been established.

== Challenges ==
Development of antibiotics is difficult, whereas many drug discoveries have been a result of concerted effort and intensive research and development, antibiotics have seemingly been discovered by chance. Since 1987 there have been no discoveries or development of a new class of antibiotics. This is partly due to the finicky nature of antibiotics. As most are produced biosynthetically they require an organism to produce. Historically this has meant that different species are grown and observed for any antimicrobial activity. Not only does this require a culturable species to start off with, but the conditions the species are grown in must be adequate for production of antibiotics as well as having the number of antibiotics produced reach a density threshold so that their function can be observed.

Another reason behind the lack of new antibiotic production is the diminishing amount of return on investment for antibiotics and thus the lack resources put into research and development by private pharmaceutical companies. The World Health Organization has recognized the danger of antibiotic resistant bacteria and has created a list of "priority pathogens" that are of the utmost concern. In doing so the hope is to stimulate R&D that can create a new generation of antibiotics. In the United States, the Biomedical Advanced Research and Development Authority (BARDA) aims to support the work of the industry to produce new antibiotics.

The buildup of inorganic phosphate can limit the biosynthetic production of certain antibiotics, researchers found that by using an inorganic phosphate trapping agent, the phosphate would be sequestered away and antibiotic production would return to normal levels, thus allowing production to continue.

Meropenem is mixed with sodium carbonate post-production before being injected into the body, subsequent analysis of this mixture using Nuclear Magnetic Resonance has shown that a second form of Meropenem is produced. This second form has an additional carbon dioxide on it, and exists alongside the pure form. In order to ensure that Meropenem stays in the correct form a four-step process was developed wherein the crude form is mixed together with a base in water, a proper pH is established, the product is treated with alkanols, and then the pure form is isolated.

== Sources ==
- Baron, Samuel (1996). Medical Microbiology (4th ed.). The University of Texas Medical Branch at Galveston. ISBN 978-0-9631172-1-2.
- Madigan, Michael; Martinko, John, eds. (2005). Brock Biology of Microorganisms (11th ed.). Prentice Hall. ISBN 978-0-13-144329-7.
