= Amycolatopsis carbonis =

Scientific classification
- Domain: Bacteria
- Kingdom: Bacillati
- Phylum: Actinomycetota
- Class: Actinomycetes
- Order: Pseudonocardiales
- Family: Pseudonocardiaceae
- Genus: Amycolatopsis
- Species: A. carbonis

Binomial name
- Amycolatopsis carbonis Oyuntsetseg and Kim 2024

Species of actinobacterium

Amycolatopsis is a genus of high GC-content bacteria within the family Pseudonocardiaceae. The genus is known for producing many types of antibiotics, including Vancomycin, obtained from Amycolatopsis orientalis, is being used for infections resistant to other antibiotics.

Amycolatopsis carbonis is an actinobacterium from the genus Amycolatopsis that has been isolated from a coal mining site soil in Mongolia (Nalaikh coal mining site, Nalaikh, Mongolia). Amycolatopsis carbonis showed broad antifungal activity against several filamentous fungi and also antibacterial activity against methicillin-resistant Staphylococcus aureus and Acinetobacter baumannii. The type strain for Amycolatopsis carbonis is 2-15^{T}=KCTC 39525^{T}=JCM 30563^{T}.
