= C7H15NO3 =

The molecular formula C_{7}H_{15}NO_{3} may refer to:

- Carnitine, a quaternary ammonium compound
- Vancosamine, aminosugars that are a part of vancomycin and related molecules
