= Albidoflava =

Albidoflava may refer to:

- Amycolatopsis albidoflava, bacterium
- Russula albidoflava, species of fungus
