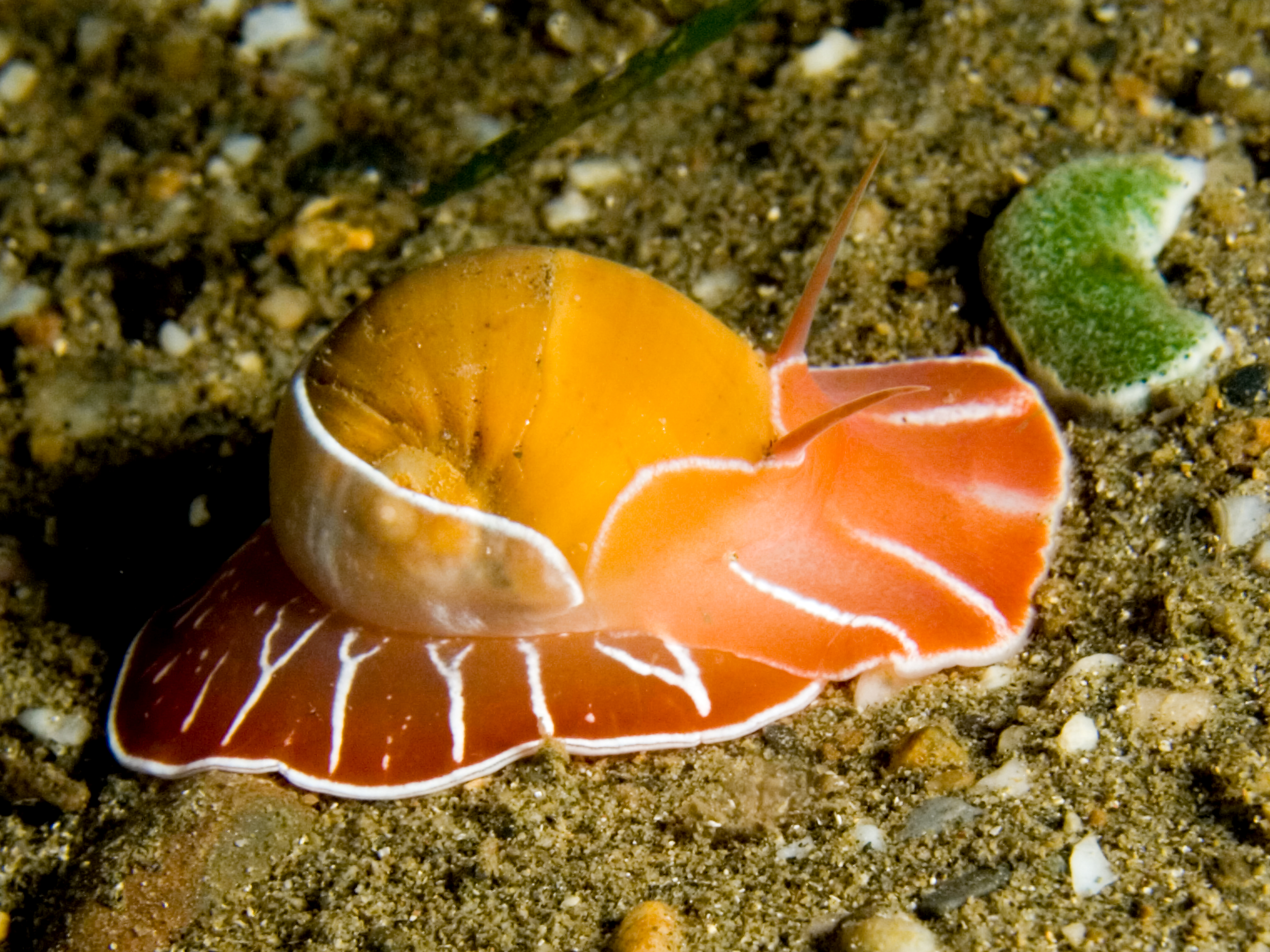
- A live individual of Naticarius orientalis in situ

Scientific classification
- Kingdom: Animalia
- Phylum: Mollusca
- Class: Gastropoda
- Subclass: Caenogastropoda
- Order: Littorinimorpha
- Superfamily: Naticoidea
- Family: Naticidae
- Subfamily: Naticinae
- Genus: Naticarius; Duméril, 1805

Type species
- Nerita canrena Linnaeus, 1758

Synonyms
- Natica (Naticarius) Duméril, 1805; Naticus Montfort, 1810; Quantonatica Iredale, 1936

= Naticarius =

Genus of gastropods

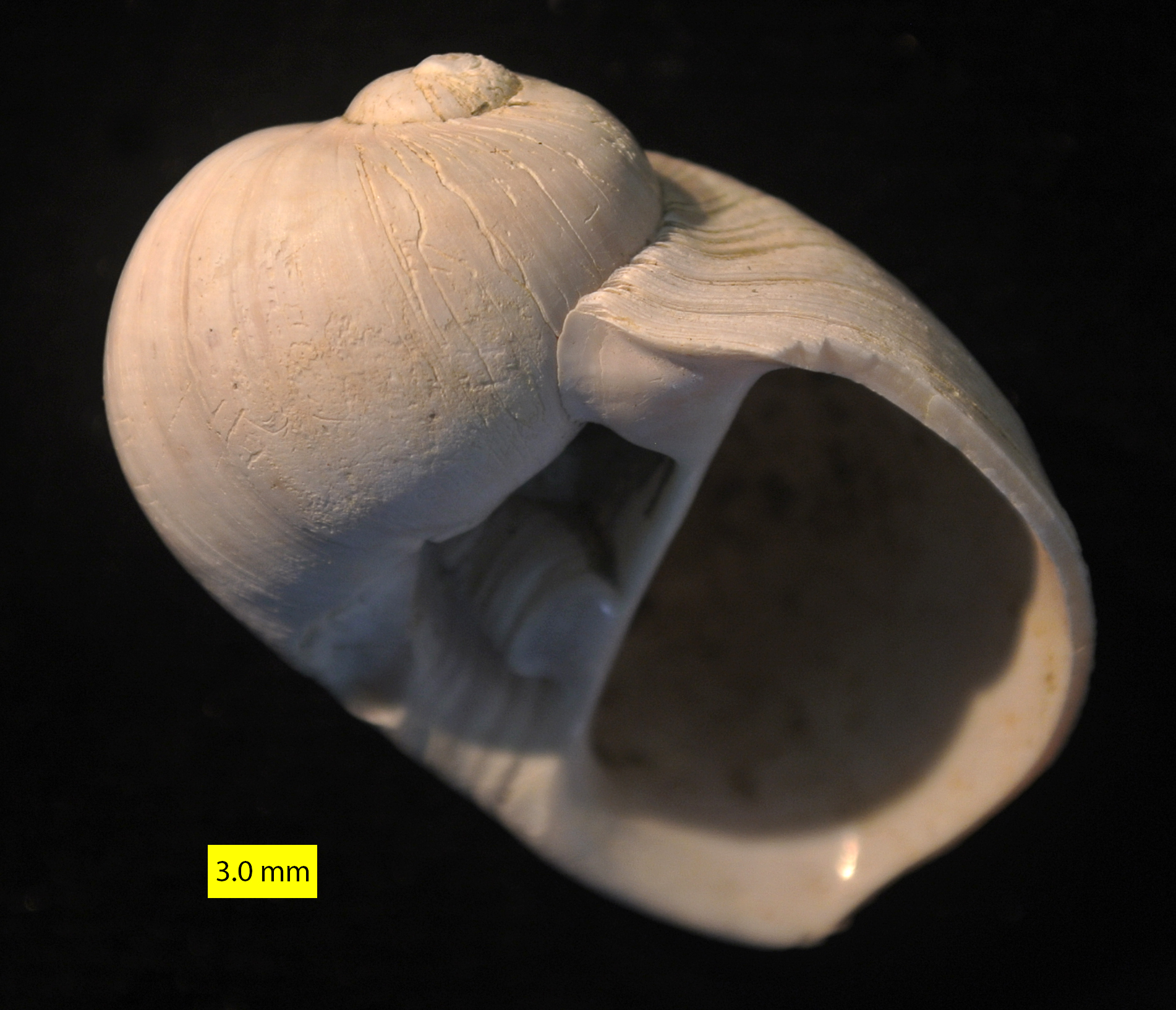
Fossil Naticarius millepunctatus, Nicosia Formation, Pliocene, Cyprus.

Naticarius is a genus (or subgenus) of predatory sea snails, marine gastropods in the subfamily Naticinae of the family Naticidae, the moon snails.

The species within this genus were previously placed in the genus Natica, subgenus Naticarius. This classification is still used by a number of leading malacologists.

The operculum in this genus is calcareous.

== Species ==
Species within the genus Naticarius include:

- † Naticarius brevisulcatus (Garvie, 1996)
- Naticarius caneloensis (Hertlein & A. M. Strong, 1955)
- Naticarius canrena (Linnaeus, 1758)
- Naticarius cayennensis (Récluz, 1850)
- Naticarius colima (A. M. Strong & Hertlein, 1937)
- Naticarius colliei (Récluz, 1844)
- Naticarius concinnus (Dunker, 1860)
- Naticarius donghaiensis (X.-T. Ma & S.-P. Zhang, 2003)
- Naticarius excellens Azuma, 1961
- Naticarius hainanensis (X. Liu, 1977)
- Naticarius hebraeus (Martyn, 1786)
- Naticarius insecta (Jousseaume, 1874)
- Naticarius lineozona (Jousseaume, 1874)
- † Naticarius lucapedrialii Harzhauser, Landau & Guzhov, 2025
- Naticarius manceli (Jousseaume, 1874)
- Naticarius marchei (Jousseaume, 1874)
- Naticarius melanoperculatus (X. Liu, 1977)
- Naticarius onca (Röding, 1798)
- Naticarius orientalis (Gmelin, 1791)
- Naticarius philippinensis (R. B. Watson, 1881)
- Naticarius pumilus (Kubo, 1997)
- Naticarius scopaespira (X. Liu, 1977)
- Naticarius sertatus (Menke, 1843)
- Naticarius stercusmuscarum (Gmelin, 1791)
- Naticarius subcostatus (Tenison Woods, 1878) (accepted > unreplaced junior homonym, of Natica subcostata d'Archiac & Verneuil, 1842)
- Naticarius turtoni (E. A. Smith, 1890)
- † Naticarius uvasanus (Gabb, 1864)
- Naticarius zonalis (Récluz, 1850)

Species brought into synonymy

- Naticarius alapapilionis (Röding, 1798): synonym of Glyphepithema alapapilionis (Röding, 1798) (superseded combination)
- Naticarius cruentatus (Gmelin, 1791) sensu Poppe & Goto, 1991: synonym of Naticarius hebraeus (Martyn, 1786)
- Naticarius fanel (Röding, 1798): synonym of Naticarius hebraeus (Martyn, 1786)
- Naticarius lavendula (Woolacott, 1956): synonym of Natica buriasiensis (Récluz, 1844)
- Naticarius lineatus (Röding, 1798): synonym of Tanea lineata (Röding, 1798)
- Naticarius marochiensis (Gmelin, 1791): synonym of Natica marochiensis (Gmelin, 1791)
- Naticarius oteroi Fernandes & Rolán, 1990: synonym of Natica oteroi (Fernandes & Rolán, 1991)
- Naticarius punctatus (Karsten, 1789): synonym of Naticarius stercusmuscarum (Gmelin, 1791)
- Naticarius subcostatus (Tenison Woods, 1878): synonym of Notocochlis subcostata (Tenison Woods, 1878)
- Naticarius vittatus (Gmelin, 1791): synonym of Natica vittata (Gmelin, 1791)
