= Amycolatopsis mongoliensis =

Scientific classification
- Domain: Bacteria
- Kingdom: Bacillati
- Phylum: Actinomycetota
- Class: Actinomycetes
- Order: Pseudonocardiales
- Family: Pseudonocardiaceae
- Genus: Amycolatopsis
- Species: A. mongoliensis

Binomial name
- Amycolatopsis mongoliensis Oyuntsetseg et al. 2024

Species of actinobacterium

Amycolatopsis mongoliensis is a species of high GC-content bacteria within the family Pseudonocardiaceae.

Amycolatopsis mongoliensis, a novel filamentous actinobacterium designated strain 4-36^{T}, exhibiting broad-spectrum antifungal activity, was isolated from a coal mining site in Mongolia (Nalaikh coal mining site). The genome mining for biosynthetic gene clusters of secondary metabolites in Amycolatopsis mongoliensis revealed the presence of 34 gene clusters involved in the production of polyketide synthase, nonribosomal peptide synthetase, ribosomally synthesized and post-translationally modified peptides, lanthipeptides, terpenes, siderophores, and many other unknown clusters.
