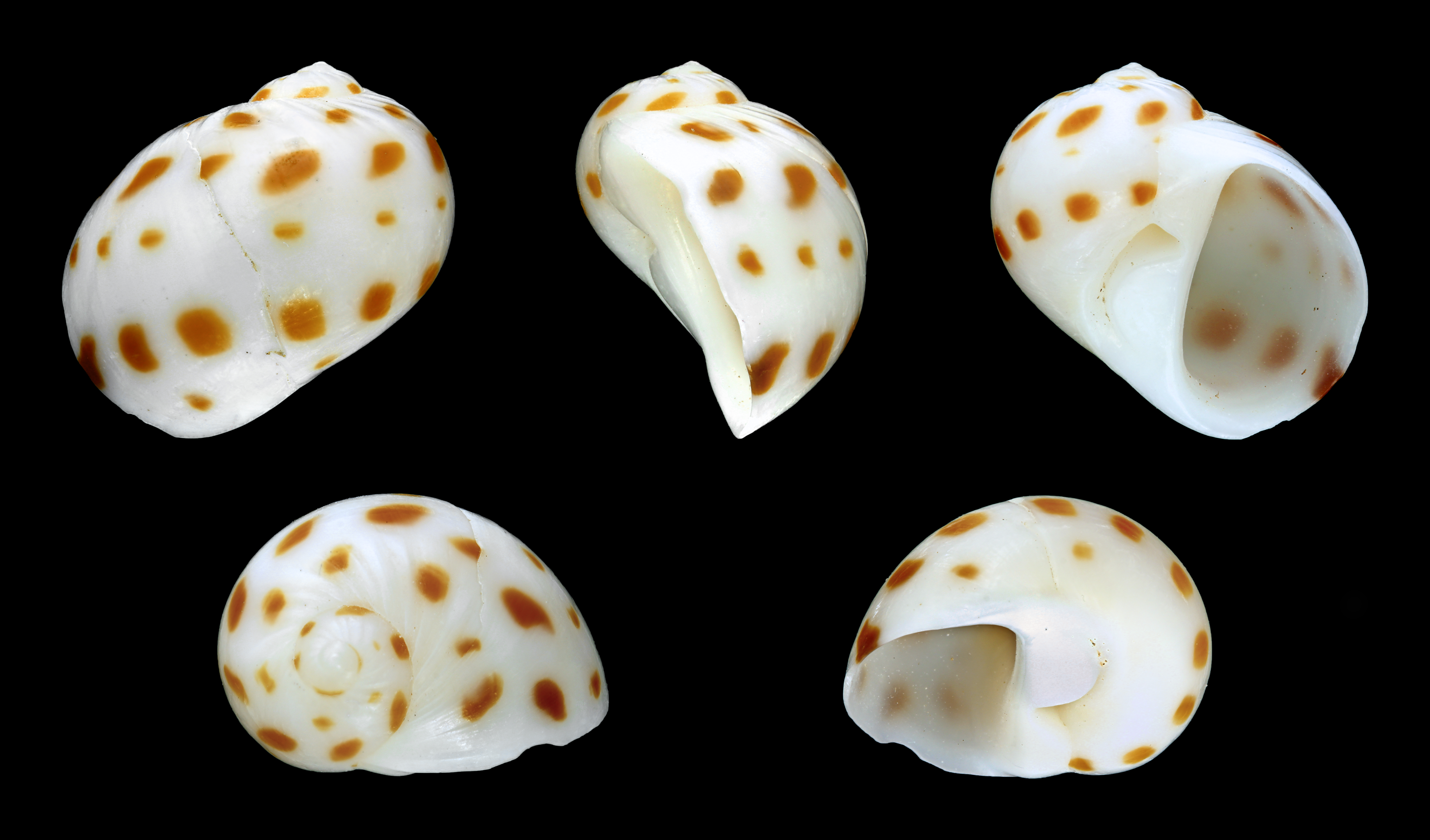

Scientific classification
- Kingdom: Animalia
- Phylum: Mollusca
- Class: Gastropoda
- Subclass: Caenogastropoda
- Order: Littorinimorpha
- Family: Naticidae
- Genus: Naticarius
- Species: N. onca

Binomial name
- Naticarius onca (Röding, 1798)

Synonyms
- Cochlis onca Röding, 1798 (basionym); Cochlis pavimentum Röding, 1798; Natica cailliaudii Récluz, 1850; Natica chinensis Lamarck, 1816; Natica litterata Link, 1807; Natica onca (Röding, 1798); Nerita candida W. Wood, 1825

= Naticarius onca =

Species of gastropod

Naticarius onca is a species of predatory sea snail, a marine gastropod mollusk in the family Naticidae, the moon snails.

== Description ==
Shell size 20 mm.

== Distribution ==
The species is known to occur in the Red Sea and in the Indo-Pacific off Aldabra, Madagascar, Mascarene Basin, Mauritius, Mozambique and Tanzania
