= Industrial microbiology =

Branch of biotechnology

Representation of bioreactors. They are used to store the microbes while they are producing desired product of interest.

Industrial microbiology is a branch of biotechnology that applies microbial sciences to create industrial products in mass quantities, often using microbial cell factories. There are multiple ways to manipulate a microorganism in order to increase maximum product yields. Introduction of mutations into an organism may be accomplished by introducing them to mutagens. Another way to increase production is by gene amplification, this is done by the use of plasmids, and vectors. The plasmids and/ or vectors are used to incorporate multiple copies of a specific gene that would allow more enzymes to be produced that eventually cause more product yield. The manipulation of organisms in order to yield a specific product has many applications to the real world like the production of some antibiotics, vitamins, enzymes, amino acids, solvents, alcohol and daily products. Microorganisms play a big role in the industry, with multiple ways to be used. Medicinally, microbes can be used for creating antibiotics in order to treat infection. Microbes can also be used for the food industry as well. Microbes are very useful in creating some of the mass produced products that are consumed by people. The chemical industry also uses microorganisms in order to synthesize amino acids and organic solvents. Microbes can also be used in an agricultural application for use as a biopesticide instead of using dangerous chemicals and or inoculants to help plant proliferation.

== Medical application ==
The medical application to industrial microbiology is the production of new drugs synthesized in a specific organism for medical purposes. Production of antibiotics is necessary for the treatment of many bacterial infections. Some natural occurring antibiotics and precursors, are produced through a process called fermentation. The microorganisms grow in a liquid media where the population size is controlled in order to yield the greatest amount of product. In this environment nutrient, pH, temperature, and oxygen are controlled also in order to maximize the amount of cells and cause them not to die before the production of the antibiotic of interest. Once the antibiotic is produced it must be extracted in order to yield an income.

Vitamins also get produced in massive quantities either by fermentation or biotransformation. Vitamin B 2 (riboflavin) for example is produced both ways. Biotransformation is mostly used for the production of riboflavin, and the carbon source starting material for this reaction is glucose. There are a few strains of microorganisms that were engineered to increase the yield of riboflavin produced. The most common organism used for this reaction is Ashbya gossypii. The fermentation process is another common way to produce riboflavin. The most common organism used for production of riboflavin through fermentation is Eremothecium ashbyii. Once riboflavin is produced it must be extracted from the broth, this is done by heating the cells for a certain amount of time, and then the cells can be filtered out of solution. Riboflavin is later purified and released as final product.

Microbial biotransformation can be used to produce steroid medicaments. Steroids can be consumed either orally or by injection. Steroids play a big role in the control of arthritis. Cortisone is an anti-inflammatory drug that fights against arthritis, as well as several skin diseases. Another steroid used is testosterone, which was produced from dehydroepiandrosterone by using the Corynebacterium species.

== Food industry application ==
=== Fermentation ===
Fermentation is a reaction where sugar can be converted into a gas, alcohols or acids. Fermentation happens anaerobically, which means microorganisms that go through fermentation can function without the presence of oxygen. Yeasts and bacteria are commonly used to mass produce multiple products. Drinking alcohol is a product that is produced by yeasts and bacteria. Alcohol that can be consumed is also known as ethanol, and ethanol is used to power automobiles as a fuel source. Drinking alcohol is produced from natural sugars like glucose. Carbon dioxide is produced as a side product in this reaction and can be used to make bread, and can also be used to carbonate beverages. Fermentation Wine: Alcoholic beverages like beer and wine are fermented by microorganisms when there is no oxygen present.

In this process, once there is enough alcohol and carbon dioxide around in the media the yeast start to die due to the environment becoming toxic to them. There are many strains of yeast and bacteria that can tolerate different amounts of alcohol around in their environment before it becoming toxic, thus one can obtain different alcohol levels in beer and wine, just by selecting a different microbial strain. Most yeast can tolerate between 10 and 15 percent alcohol, but there are some strains that can tolerate up to 21 percent alcohol. Dairy products like cheese and yogurt can also be made through fermentation using microbes. Cheese was produced as a way to preserve the nutrients obtained from milk, through fermentation thus elongating the shelf-life of the product. Microbes are used to convert the lactose sugars into lactic acid through fermentation. The bacteria used for such fermentation are usually from Lactococci, Lactobacilli, or Streptococci families. Sometimes these microbes are added before or after the acidification step needed for cheese production. Also these microbes are responsible for the different flavors of cheese, since they have enzymes that breakdown milk sugars and fats into multiple building blocks. Some other microbes like mold may be purposely introduced during or before the aging of the cheese, in order to give it a different flavor.

The production of yogurt starts from the pasteurization of milk, where undesired microbes are reduced or eliminated. Once the milk is pasteurized the milk is ready to be processed to reduce fat and liquid content, so what remains is mostly solid content. This can be done by drying the milk so that the liquid evaporates or by adding concentrated milk. Increasing the solid content of the milk also increases the nutritional value since the nutrients are more concentrated. After this step is accomplished, the milk is ready for fermentation where the milk gets inoculated with bacteria in hygienic stainless steel containers and then gets carefully monitored for lactic acid production, temperature and pH.

Enzymes can be produced through fermentation either by submerged fermentation and/ or by solid state fermentation. Submerged fermentation is referred to when the microorganisms are in contact with media. In this process the contact with oxygen is essential. The bioreactors/fermentors that are used to do these mass production of product can store up to 500 cubic meters in volume. Solid state fermentation is less common than submerged fermentation, but has many benefits. There is less need for the environment to be sterile since there is less water, there is a higher stability and concentration for the end product. Insulin synthesis is done through the fermentation process and the use of recombinant E.coli or yeast in order to make human insulin also called Humulin.

== Agriculture application ==
The demand for agricultural products is constantly increasing due to the need of various fertilizers and pesticides. There are long term effects of the overuse of chemical fertilizers and pesticides. Due to the excessive use of chemical fertilizers and pesticides, the soil becomes infertile and a non-sufficient use for growing crops. For that matter, biofertelizers, biopesticides and organic farming come to the rescue.

Biopesticide is a pesticide derived from a living organism or natural occurring substances. Biochemical pesticides can also be produced from naturally occurring substances that can control pest populations in a non-toxic matter. An example of a biochemical pesticide is garlic and pepper based insecticides, these work by repelling insects from the desired location. Microbial pesticides, usually a virus, bacterium, or fungus are used to control pest populations in a more specific manner. The most commonly used microbe for the production of microbial bio-pesticides is Bacillus thuringiensis, also known as Bt. This spore forming bacterium produces a delta-endotoxins in which it causes the insect or pest to stop feeding on the crop or plant because the endotoxin destroys the lining of the digestive system.

== Chemical application ==
Schematic workflow for microbial factory optimization

Synthesis of amino acids and organic solvents can also be made using microbes. The synthesis of essential amino acids such as are L-Methionine, L-Lysine, L-Tryptophan and the non-essential amino acid L-glutamic acid are used today mainly for feed, food, and pharmaceutical industries. The production of these amino acids is due to Corynebacterium glutamicum and fermentation. C.glutamicum was engineered to be able to produce L-lysine and L-Glutamic acid in large quantities. L-Glutamic acid had a high demand for production because this amino acid is used to produce Monosodium glutamate (MSG) a food flavoring agent. In 2012 the total production of L-Glutamic acid was 2.2 million tons and is produced using a submerged fermentation technique inoculated with C.glutamicum. L-Lysine was originally produced from diaminopimelic acid (DAP) by E.coli, but once the C.glutamicum was discovered for the production of L-Glutamic acid. This organism and other autotrophs were later modified to yield other amino acids such as lysine, aspartate, methionine, isoleucine and threonine. L-Lysine is used for the feeding of pigs and chicken, as well as to treat nutrient deficiency, increase energy in a patient, and sometimes used to treat viral infections. L-Tryptophan is also produced through fermentation and by Corynebacterium and E.coli, though the production is not as large as the rest of the amino acids it is still produced for pharmaceutical purposes since it can be converted and used to produce neurotransmitters.

The production of organic solvents like acetone, butanol, and isopropanol through fermentation was one of the first things to be produced by using bacteria, since achieving the necessary chirality of the products is easily achieved by using living systems. Solvent fermentation uses a series of Clostridia bacterial species. Solvent fermentation at first was not as productive as it is used today. The amount of bacteria required to yield a product was high, and the actual yield of product was low. Later technological advances were discovered that allowed scientist to genetically alter these strains to achieve a higher yield for these solvents. These Clostridial strains were transformed to have extra gene copies of enzymes necessary for solvent production, as well as being more tolerant to higher concentrations of the solvent being produced, since these bacteria have a range of product in which they can survive in before the environment becomes toxic. Yielding more strains that can use other substrates was also another way to increase the productivity of these bacteria.
