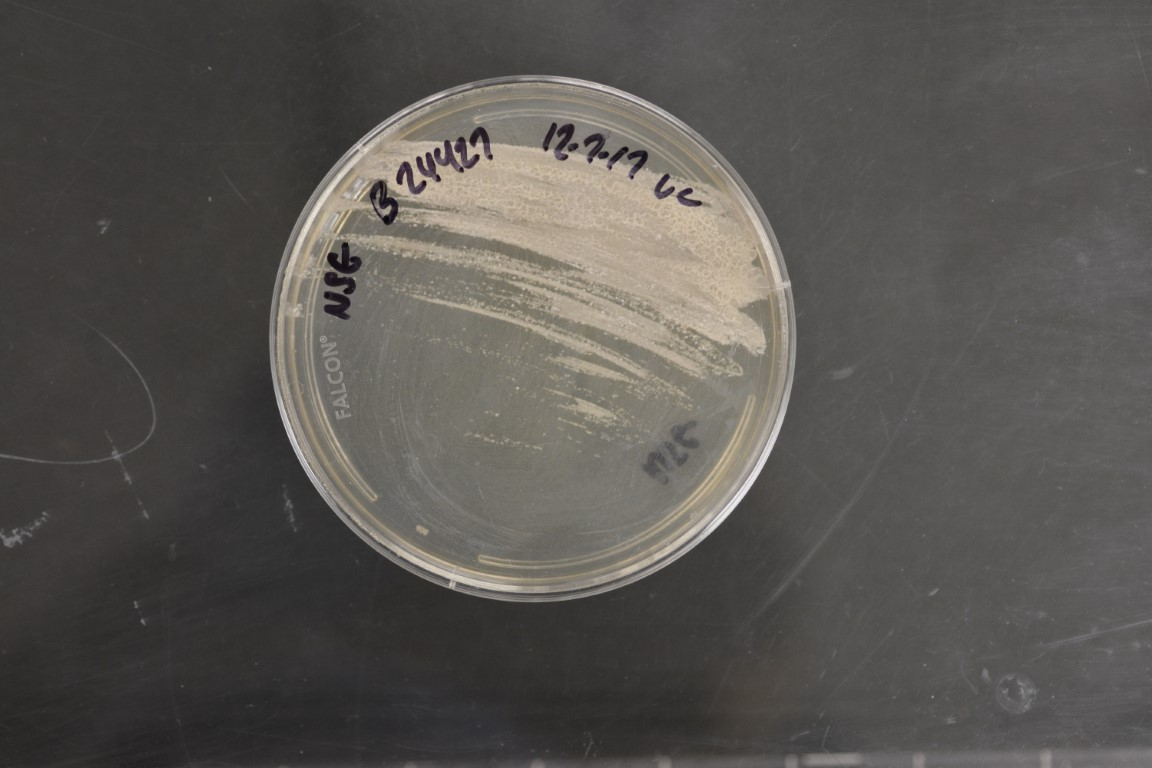
- Amycolatopsis jejuensis on agar plate

Scientific classification
- Domain: Bacteria
- Kingdom: Bacillati
- Phylum: Actinomycetota
- Class: Actinomycetes
- Order: Pseudonocardiales
- Family: Pseudonocardiaceae
- Genus: Amycolatopsis; Lechevalier et al. 1986

Type species
- Amycolatopsis orientalis (Pittenger and Brigham 1956) Lechevalier et al. 1986

Species
- See text

Synonyms
- Yuhushiella Mao et al. 2011

= Amycolatopsis =

Genus of bacteria

Amycolatopsis is a genus of high GC-content bacteria within the family Pseudonocardiaceae. The genus is known for producing many types of antibiotics, including

- Epoxyquinomicin, related to Amycolatopsis sulphurea, are a class of weak antibiotic and anti-inflammatory agent.
- Vancomycin, obtained from Amycolatopsis orientalis, is being used for infections resistant to other antibiotics.
- Ristocetin, made by Amycolatopsis lurida, was an antibiotic but ceased to apply due to adverse effects of platelet agglutination. Now it is used to assay von Willebrand disease.

== Degradation of bio-polymers ==
Several bacteria from the genus Amycolatopsis are able to enzymatically hydrolyze the ester bonds of poly-lactic acid (PLA) films in aquatic medium. So far, it is one of the few known bacteria able to biodegrade the bioplastic outside compost facilities in a relatively short period of time.

== Phylogeny ==
The currently accepted taxonomy is based on the List of Prokaryotic names with Standing in Nomenclature (LPSN) and National Center for Biotechnology Information (NCBI).

16S rRNA based LTP_10_2024

- Amycolatopsis
  - - - A. acididurans Teo et al. 2021
      - - - A. alkalitolerans Narsing Rao et al. 2020
          - A. pithecellobii corrig. Mingma et al. 2020
        - - A. pigmentata Tamura et al. 2010
          - - A. helveola Tamura et al. 2010
            - A. taiwanensis Tseng et al. 2006
    - - A. cappadoca Işık et al. 2019
      - - A. thermalba Zucchi et al. 2012
        - - A. ruanii Zucchi et al. 2012
          - - - A. granulosa Zucchi et al. 2012
              - A. viridis Zucchi et al. 2012
            - - - A. methanolica De Boer et al. 1990
                - A. thermoflava Chun et al. 1999
              - - A. tucumanensis Albarracín et al. 2010
                - - A. eurytherma Kim et al. 2002
                  - - A. thermophila Zucchi et al. 2012
                    - - A. deserti Busarakam et al. 2017
                      - A. endophytica Miao et al. 2012
  - - - - A. acidicola Teo et al. 2020
        - - A. halophila Tang et al. 2010
          - A. salitolerans Guan et al. 2012
      - - - A. acidiphila Oyuntsetseg et al. 2017
          - A. bartoniae Zucchi et al. 2012
        - - A. rhizosphaerae Thawai 2018
          - - A. dongchuanensis Nie et al. 2012
            - A. sacchari Goodfellow et al. 2001
    - - - A. albispora Zhang et al. 2016
        - - A. magusensis Camas et al. 2013
          - A. xuchangensis Huang et al. 2021
      - - - A. marina Bian et al. 2009
          - A. palatopharyngis Huang et al. 2004
        - - A. xylanica Chen et al. 2010
          - - - A. suaedae Chantavorakit et al. 2019
              - - "A. aidingensis" Li et al. 2021
                - A. cihanbeyliensis Tatar et al. 2013
            - - A. anabasis Wang et al. 2020
              - - - A. minnesotensis Lee et al. 2006
                  - - A. nigrescens Groth et al. 2007
                    - - A. antarctica Wang et al. 2018
                      - A. jiguanensis Huang et al. 2021
                - - - A. jiangsuensis Xing et al. 2014
                    - - - A. panacis Peng et al. 2019
                        - A. ultiminotia Lee 2009
                      - - A. jejuensis Lee 2006
                        - A. sulphurea Lechevalier et al. 1986
                  - - - A. dendrobii Tedsree et al. 2021
                      - A. nivea Niu et al. 2020
                    - - A. saalfeldensis Carlsohn et al. 2007
                      - - - - A. alba Mertz and Yao 1993
                            - - - A. thailandensis Chomchoei et al. 2011
                                - A. umgeniensis Everest et al. 2013
                              - - A. coloradensis Labeda 1995
                                - A. roodepoortensis Everest et al. 2015
                          - - - A. orientalis (Pittenger and Brigham 1956) Lechevalier et al. 1986
                              - A. regifaucium Tan et al. 2007
                            - - A. speibonae Everest et al. 2015
                              - - - A. decaplanina Wink et al. 2004
                                  - A. keratiniphila Al-Musallam et al. 2003
                                - - A. lurida (Lechevalier et al. 1986) Stackebrandt et al. 2004
                                  - - A. azurea (Ōmura et al. 1983) Henssen et al. 1987
                                    - - A. japonica corrig. Goodfellow et al. 1997
                                      - A. oliviviridis Penkhrue et al. 2018
                        - - - - - A. iheyensis Ngamcharungchit et al. 2023
                                - A. rhabdoformis Souza et al. 2015
                              - - A. australiensis Tan et al. 2006
                                - - A. plumensis Saintpierre-Bonaccio et al. 2005
                                  - A. tolypomycina Wink et al. 2003
                            - - A. albidoflava corrig. Lee and Hah 2001
                              - - - A. halotolerans Lee 2006
                                  - - A. echigonensis Ding et al. 2007
                                    - A. niigatensis Ding et al. 2007
                                - - A. benzoatilytica Majumdar et al. 2006
                                  - - A. circi Everest and Meyers 2012
                                    - - A. equina Everest and Meyers 2012
                                      - A. hippodromi Everest and Meyers 2012
                          - - - A. rubida Huang et al. 2001
                              - A. silviterrae Jamjan et al. 2018
                            - - - A. bullii Zucchi et al. 2012
                                - A. vancoresmycina Wink et al. 2003
                              - - A. kentuckyensis Labeda et al. 2003
                                - - - - A. lexingtonensis Labeda et al. 2003
                                      - A. pretoriensis Labeda et al. 2003
                                    - - A. rifamycinica Bala et al. 2004
                                      - - A. eburnea Chaiya et al. 2019
                                        - "A. camponoti" Zakalyukina et al. 2022
                                  - - A. balhimycina Wink et al. 2003
                                    - - - A. samaneae Duangmal et al. 2011
                                        - A. stemonae Klykleung et al. 2015
                                      - - A. mediterranei (Margalith and Beretta 1960) Lechevalier et al. 1986
                                        - A. vastitatis Idris et al. 2019

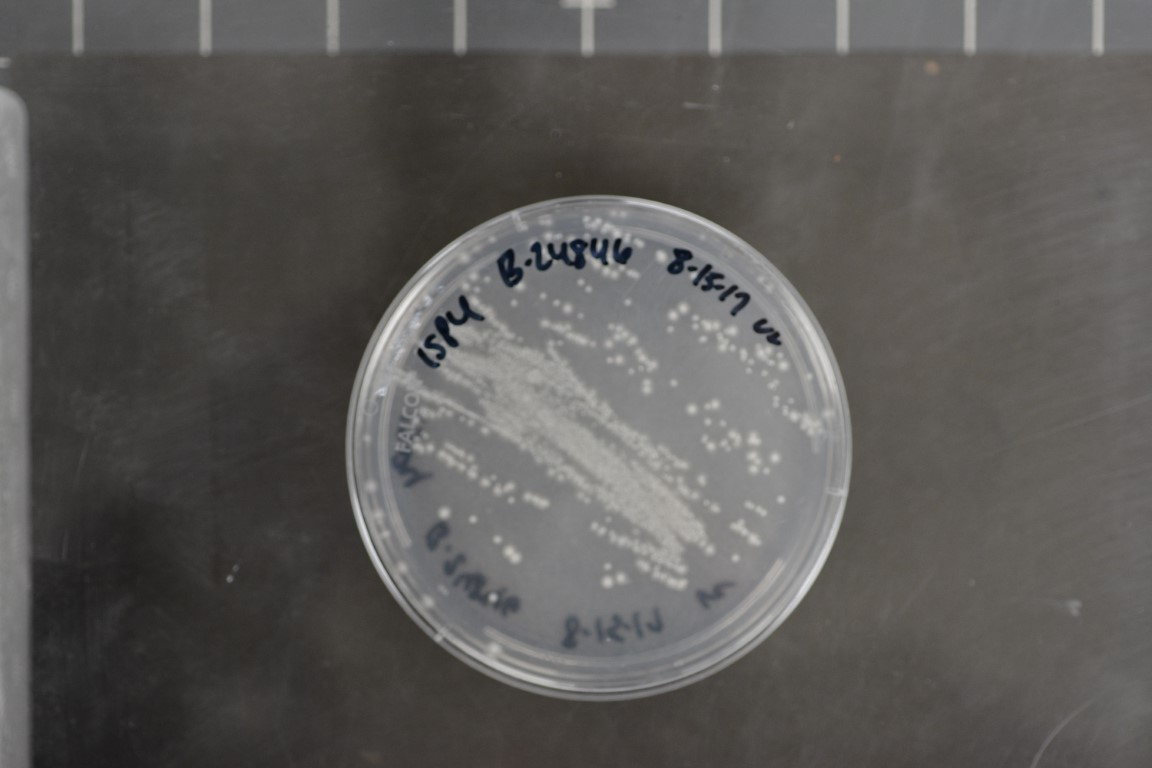
Amycolatopsis bartoniae

Species incertae sedis:

- A. arida Nouioui et al. 2018
- A. carbonis Oyuntsetseg and Kim 2024
- "A. cyclosori" Chen et al. 2025
- "A. cynarae" Deng et al. 2024
- "A. flava" Wei et al. 2015
- "A. lactamdurans" Stapley et al. 1973 ex Barreiro et al. 2000
- A. nalaikhensis Oyuntsetseg & Kim 2024
- "A. pittospori" Kaewkla and Franco 2021
- A. ponsaeliensis Thompson et al. 2025
- A. rhizosphaerihabitans Chen et al. 2025

== See also ==
- List of bacterial orders
- List of bacteria genera
