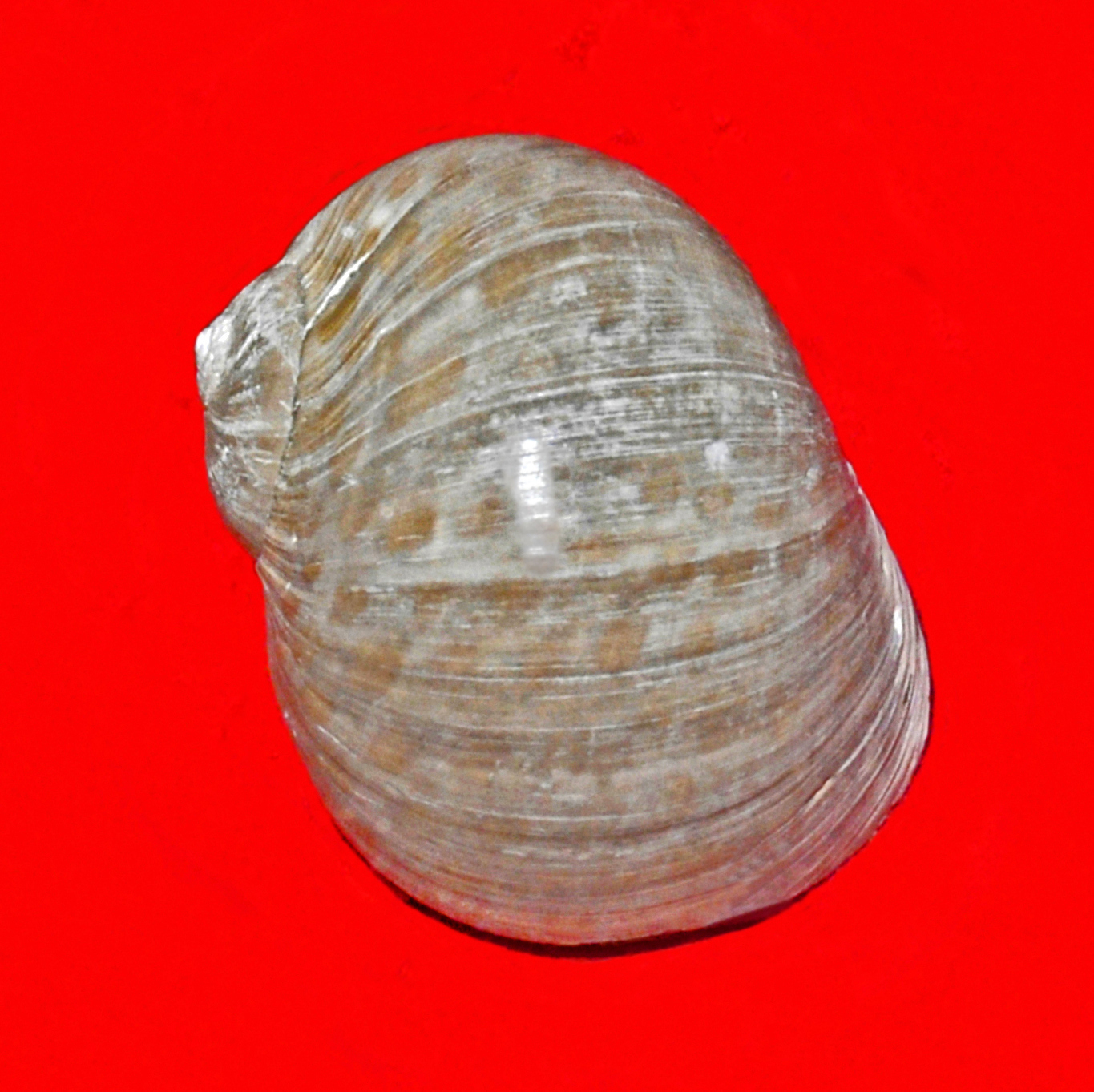
- Fossil shell of Naticarius stercusmuscarum from Pleistocene of Italy

Scientific classification
- Kingdom: Animalia
- Phylum: Mollusca
- Class: Gastropoda
- Subclass: Caenogastropoda
- Order: Littorinimorpha
- Family: Naticidae
- Genus: Naticarius
- Species: N. stercusmuscarum

Binomial name
- Naticarius stercusmuscarum (Gmelin, 1791)

Synonyms
- Natica millepunctata Lamarck, 1822; Natica stercusmuscarum Gmelin, 1791; Nerita stercusmuscarum Gmelin, 1791 (basionym)

= Naticarius stercusmuscarum =

Naticarius stercusmuscarum Temporal range: Pleistocene - Recent

Species of gastropod

Naticarius stercusmuscarum, the Fly-specked Moon Snail, is a species of predatory sea snail, a marine gastropod mollusk in the family Naticidae, the moon snails.

== Description ==
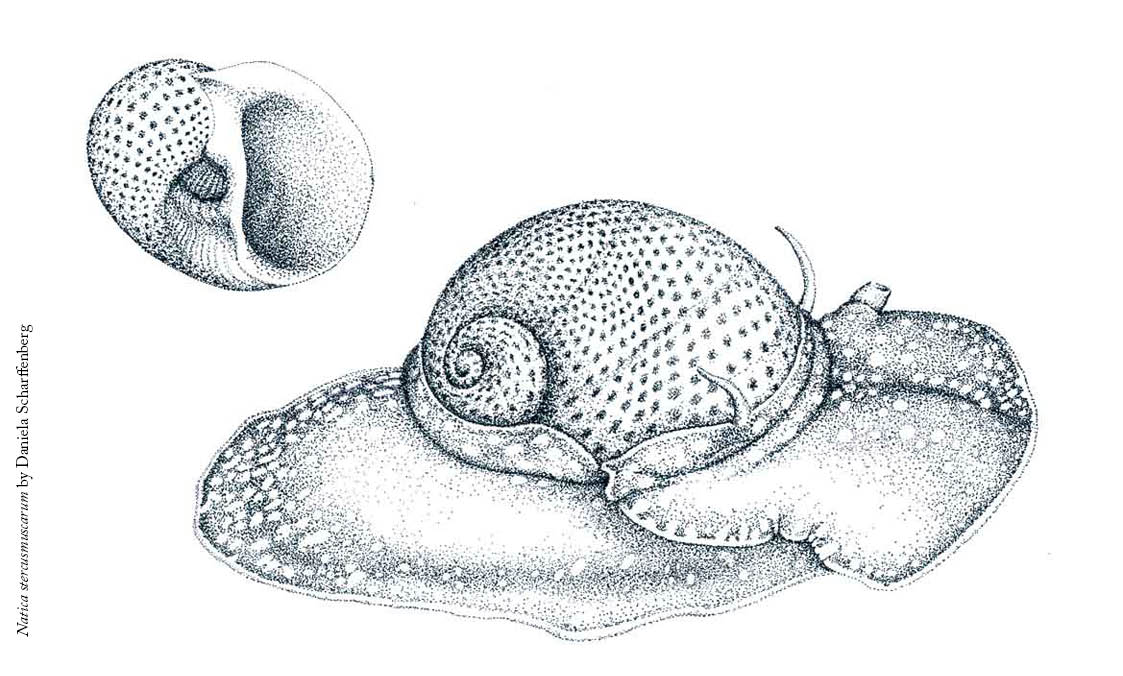
Drawing of Natica stercusmuscarum

Shells of Naticarius stercusmuscarum can reach a size of 25–56 millimetres (0.98–2.20 in). The shell surface is yellow or color cream with dense, small, red-brown dots. The mantle and the foot of this mollusk are brownish dotted with bright spots. It has a well-developed foot with the two cephalic visible appendages.

== Distribution and habitat ==
This quite common species can be found in the Mediterranean sea and in North Western Africa. It lives mostly on sandy and muddy seabeds but it can also be found on rocky bottoms.

Fossils of this species can be found in sediment of Italy and Greece from Pleistocene to recent.
