= Amycolatopsis alba =

Scientific classification
- Domain: Bacteria
- Kingdom: Bacillati
- Phylum: Actinomycetota
- Class: Actinomycetia
- Order: Pseudonocardiales
- Family: Pseudonocardiaceae
- Genus: Amycolatopsis
- Species: A. alba

Binomial name
- Amycolatopsis alba Mertz and Yao 1993

Type strain
- A 838SD; A83850; ATCC 51368; DSM 44262; IFO 15602; IMSNU 22095; JCM 10030; KCTC 9611; NBRC 15602; NRRL 18532

Species of bacterium

Amycolatopsis alba is a bacterium from the genus of Amycolatopsis which has been isolated from soil. The strain DSM 44262 of Amycolatopsis alba produces sesquiterpenes and ansamycins.
