= Amycolatopsis acidiphila =

Scientific classification
- Domain: Bacteria
- Kingdom: Bacillati
- Phylum: Actinomycetota
- Class: Actinomycetes
- Order: Pseudonocardiales
- Family: Pseudonocardiaceae
- Genus: Amycolatopsis
- Species: A. acidiphila

Binomial name
- Amycolatopsis acidiphila Oyuntsetseg et al., 2017

Species of acidophilic actinobacterium

Amycolatopsis acidiphila is an acidophilic actinobacterium from the genus Amycolatopsis that has been isolated from a coal mining site soil in Mongolia (Nalaikh coal mining site, Nalaikh, Mongolia).
