= Nicrophorus orientalis =

Nicrophorus orientalis may refer to:

- Nicrophorus americanus, misidentified in 1784 by Johann Friedrich Wilhelm Herbst
- Nicrophorus dauricus, misidentified in 1860 by Motschulsky
