= Edmund Kornfeld =

American organic chemist

Edmund Carl Kornfeld
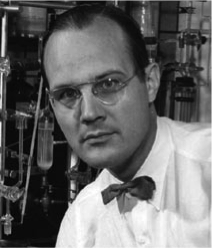
- Born: February 24, 1919; Philadelphia, Pennsylvania, US
- Died: June 22, 2012 (aged 93)
- Education: Temple University (AB); Harvard University (PhD)

Edmund Carl Kornfeld (February 24, 1919 – June 22, 2012) was an American organic chemist who devoted his life to the research of new drugs. His leading discovery, with the help of a team, was an antibiotic that was later named vancomycin.

== Early life and education ==
Edmund Carl Kornfeld was born on February 24, 1919, in Philadelphia, Pennsylvania, to Elsie and Julius Kornfeld. He received his AB from Temple University in 1940 and his PhD in chemistry from Harvard University in 1944.

== Career ==
In 1946, Kornfeld joined Eli Lilly and Company in Indianapolis, Indiana, where most of his discoveries took place. At Eli Lilly, he worked within the botanical and soil screening program and led the research team that isolated vancomycin in 1953. The discovery originated from a soil sample collected in 1952 on the island of Borneo, by missionary William M. Bouw. Bouw had taken over collection duties from the Reverend William W. Conley, who had been a regular contributor to Lilly's global soil screening program since 1948. This program utilized a network of Christian and Missionary Alliance members to obtain specimens from remote locations to identify novel microorganisms. While Kornfeld oversaw the initial team leadership and correspondence, the antibiotic-producing organism was identified as a previously unknown streptomycete found in the soil sample. Originally named Streptomyces orientalis, the bacterium was later reclassified as Amycolatopsis orientalis.

A breakthrough in the project occurred on June 18, 1953, when researcher Marvin Hoehn used paper chromatography to establish a unique "fingerprint" for the substance, then designated as "compound 05865". This analysis proved the compound was a radically new, water-soluble antibiotic, distinct from common rediscoveries like chloromycetin. One of the most difficult tasks Kornfeld's team faced was purification. The early purification method employed during that time utilized picric acid (a potentially explosive chemical); because of this, an alternate process was developed. However, this new method yielded material with a purity of only 82% and, when solubilized, produced a brown liquid termed "Mississippi mud". Despite its appearance, the urgent need for a penicillin alternative for resistant staphylococcal infections led to its initial human use.

The drug was first administered to a patient facing foot amputation due to a severe post-operative infection unresponsive to other antibiotics. After a five-day course of 100 mg doses of 05865 every eight hours, the infection cleared, and the patient was discharged two months later with an intact foot. Due to the clinical success and the lack of rapid resistance development, the drug was fast-tracked for approval by the Food and Drug Administration. The generic name "vancomycin" was adopted, with historical accounts attributing the name both to the term "vanquish" and the Latin word vanesco, meaning "to vanish or disappear". In 1958, the FDA approved the drug and Eli Lilly began marketing vancomycin hydrochloride under the trade name Vancocin.

In 1956, with help from Robert Burns Woodward, Kornfeld was successful in synthesizing the first lab-produced lysergic acid (LSD). Eli Lilly was looking for a treatment for anxiety, depression, psychosomatic diseases, and addiction.

Kornfeld's research also resulted in the discovery of pergolide as a medication for Parkinson's disease.

== Published books ==
Condensation of heterocyclic bases with acetylene dicarboxylic ester. Publisher: Harvard University, 1945.

The Total Synthesis of Lysergic Acid. Edmund C. Kornfeld, E. J. Fornefeld, G. Bruce Kline, Marjorie J. Mann, Dwight E. Morrison, Reuben G. Jones, R. B. Woodward.
