= Natica buriasiensis =

Scientific classification
- Kingdom: Animalia
- Phylum: Mollusca
- Class: Gastropoda
- Subclass: Caenogastropoda
- Order: Littorinimorpha
- Family: Naticidae
- Genus: Natica
- Species: N. buriasiensis

Binomial name
- Natica buriasiensis Récluz, 1844

Synonyms
- Natica atypha R. B. Watson, 1881; Natica kempi Preston, 1916; Natica supraornata Schepman, 1909; Natica trailli Reeve, 1855

Species of gastropod

Natica buriasiensis is a species of predatory sea snail, a marine gastropod mollusk in the family Naticidae, the moon snails.

== Description ==
N. buriasiensis' shell is approximately 11 mm tall and 15 mm wide at the aperture.

== Distribution ==
This species occurs in the Indian Ocean off the coasts of Madagascar, Mozambique, South Africa, India, Sri Lanka, Thailand, Malaysia, and Indonesia. In the Pacific Ocean, N. buriasiensis can be found off of Indonesia, Australia, Papua New Guinea, China, Japan, and Hawaii in the United States.
