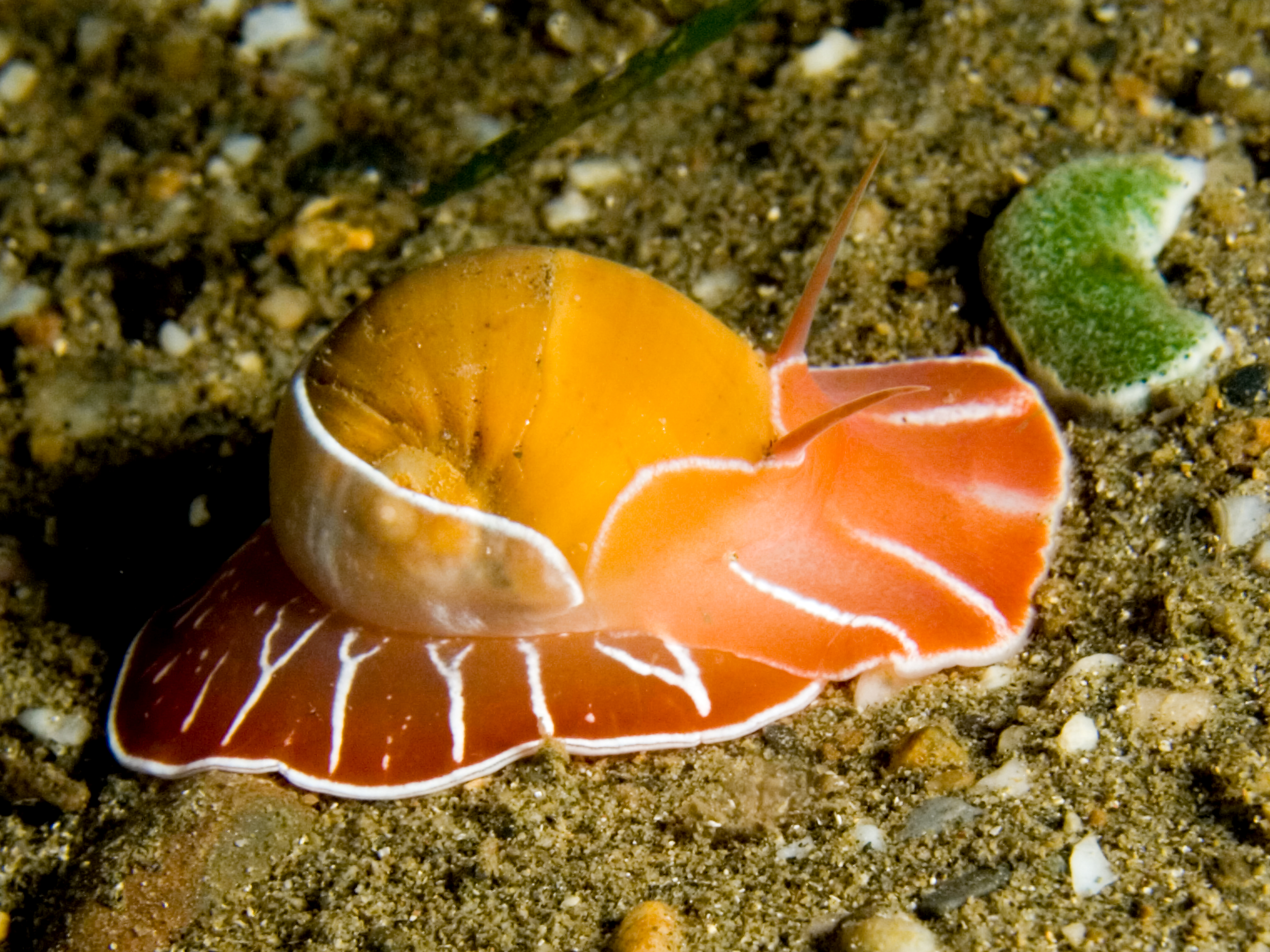
- Naticarius orientalis

Scientific classification
- Domain: Eukaryota
- Kingdom: Animalia
- Phylum: Mollusca
- Class: Gastropoda
- Subclass: Caenogastropoda
- Order: Littorinimorpha
- Family: Naticidae
- Genus: Naticarius
- Species: N. orientalis

Binomial name
- Naticarius orientalis (Gmelin, 1791)

Synonyms
- Cochlis explanata Röding, 1798; Natica eburnea Deshayes, 1838 (invalid: junior homonym of Natica eburnea de Cristofori & Jan, 1832); Nerita orientalis Gmelin, 1791 (original combination)

= Naticarius orientalis =

Species of gastropod

Naticarius orientalis is a species of predatory sea snail, a marine gastropod mollusk in the family Naticidae, the moon snails.
