= Amycolatopsis albidoflava =

Scientific classification
- Domain: Bacteria
- Kingdom: Bacillati
- Phylum: Actinomycetota
- Class: Actinomycetia
- Order: Pseudonocardiales
- Family: Pseudonocardiaceae
- Genus: Amycolatopsis
- Species: A. albidoflava

Binomial name
- Amycolatopsis albidoflava corrig. Lee and Hah 2001

Type strain
- ATCC 53205; Bristol G495-11[SA-25711; DSM 44639; G495-11; IMSNU 22139; JCM 11300; KCTC 9471; NBRC 100337; NRRL B-24149; SA-25711

Synonyms
- Amycolatopsis albidoflavus Lee and Hah 2001

Species of bacterium

Amycolatopsis albidoflava is a bacterium from the genus Amycolatopsis which has been isolated from soil.
