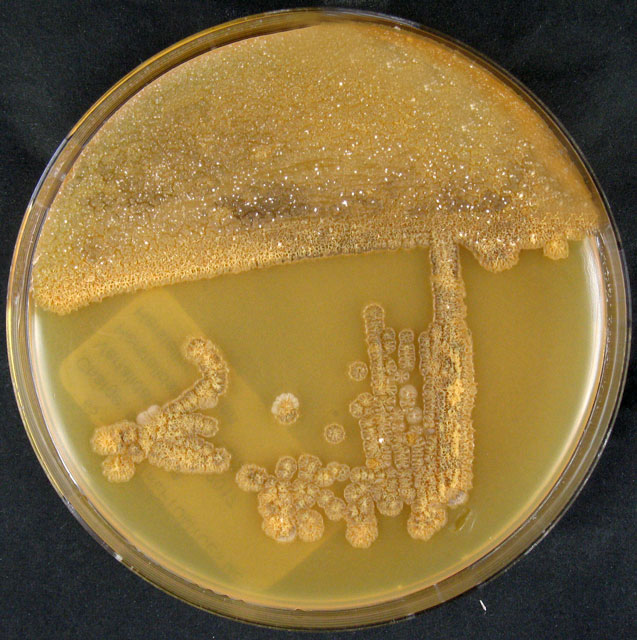

Scientific classification
- Domain: Bacteria
- Kingdom: Bacillati
- Phylum: Actinomycetota
- Class: Actinomycetia
- Order: Pseudonocardiales
- Family: Pseudonocardiaceae
- Genus: Amycolatopsis
- Species: A. orientalis

Binomial name
- Amycolatopsis orientalis (Pittenger and Brigham 1956) Lechevalier et al. 1986

Type strain
- ATCC 19795; CIP 107113; DSM 40040; IFO 12806; ISP 5040; JCM 4235; JCM 4600; NBRC 12806; NRRL 2450; UNIQEM 181; VKM Ac-866

Synonyms
- Nocardia orientalis (Pittenger and Brigham 1956) Pridham and Lyons 1969 (Approved Lists 1980); "Streptomyces orientalis" Pittenger and Brigham 1956

= Amycolatopsis orientalis =

Species of bacterium

Amycolatopsis orientalis (previously known as Streptomyces orientalis) is a Gram-positive bacterium in the phylum Actinomycetota. It produces several substances with antimicrobial properties, including the antibiotic drug vancomycin.

== History ==
A. orientalis was originally discovered by Edmund Kornfeld, an organic chemist at Eli Lilly and Company, in a soil sample gathered by a missionary from forests on the island of Borneo. The antibiotic vancomycin was first isolated from the bacteria in 1953.
