= Vancomycin =

Antibiotic medication

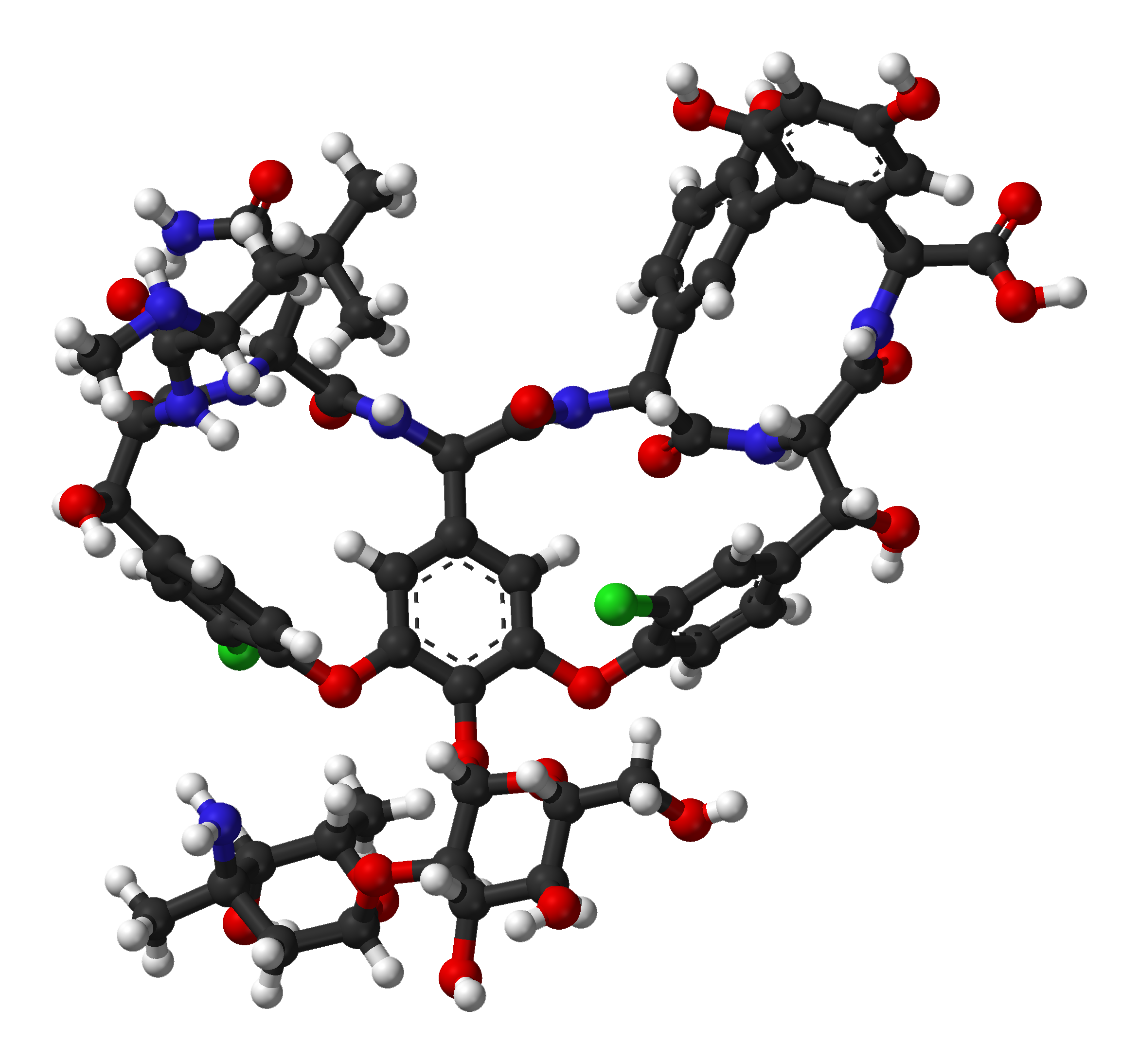

Clinical data
- Pronunciation: /væŋkəˈmaɪsɪn/
- Trade names: Vancocin, others
- AHFS/Drugs.com: Monograph
- MedlinePlus: a604038
- License data: EU EMA: by INN; US DailyMed: Vancomycin; US FDA: Vancomycin
- Pregnancy category: AU: B2
- Routes of administration: Intravenous, oral
- Drug class: Glycopeptide antibiotic
- ATC code: A07AA09 (WHO) J01XA01 (WHO) S01AA28 (WHO)

Legal status
- Legal status: AU: S4 (Prescription only); CA: ℞-only; UK: POM (Prescription only); US: ℞-only; EU: Rx-only

Pharmacokinetic data
- Bioavailability: Negligible (oral)
- Metabolism: Excreted unchanged
- Elimination half-life: 4 h to 11 h (adults, normal renal function); 6 d to 10 d (adults, impaired renal function)
- Excretion: urine (IV), feces (oral)

Identifiers
- IUPAC name: (1S,2R,18R,19R,22S,25R,28R,40S)- 48- {[(2S,3R,4S,5S,6R)- 3- {[(2S,4S,5S,6S)- 4- amino- 5- hydroxy- 4,6- dimethyloxan- 2- yl]oxy}- 4,5- dihydroxy- 6- (hydroxymethyl)oxan- 2- yl]oxy}- 22- (carbamoylmethyl)- 5,15- dichloro- 2,18,32,35,37- pentahydroxy- 19- [(2R)- 4- methyl- 2- (methylamino)pentanamido]- 20,23,26,42,44- pentaoxo- 7,13- dioxa- 21,24,27,41,43- pentaazaoctacyclo[26.14.2.2^{3,6}.2^{14,17}.1^{8,12}.1^{29,33}.0^{10,25}.0^{34,39}]pentaconta- 3,5,8(48),9,11,14,16,29(45),30,32,34,36,38,46,49- pentadecaene- 40- carboxylic acid
- CAS Number: 1404–90–6
- PubChem CID: 14969
- PubChem SID: 46505261
- DrugBank: DB00512
- ChemSpider: 14253
- UNII: 6Q205EH1VU
- KEGG: D00212; as HCl: D00926
- ChEBI: CHEBI:28001
- ChEMBL: ChEMBL262777
- CompTox Dashboard (EPA): DTXSID0042664
- ECHA InfoCard: 100.014.338

Chemical and physical data
- Formula: C_{66}H_{75}Cl_{2}N_{9}O_{24}
- Molar mass: 1449.27 g·mol^{−1}
- 3D model (JSmol): Interactive image
- SMILES: C[C@H]1[C@H]([C@@](C[C@@H](O1)O[C@@H]2[C@H]([C@@H]([C@H](O[C@H]2Oc3c4cc5cc3Oc6ccc(cc6Cl)[C@H]([C@H](C(=O)N[C@H](C(=O)N[C@H]5C(=O)N[C@@H]7c8ccc(c(c8)-c9c(cc(cc9O)O)[C@H](NC(=O)[C@H]([C@@H](c1ccc(c(c1)Cl)O4)O)NC7=O)C(=O)O)O)CC(=O)N)NC(=O)[C@@H](CC(C)C)NC)O)CO)O)O)(C)N)O
- InChI: InChI=1S/C66H75Cl2N9O24/c1-23(2)12-34(71-5)58(88)76-49-51(83)26-7-10-38(32(67)14-26)97-40-16-28-17-41(55(40)101-65-56(54(86)53(85)42(22-78)99-65)100-44-21-66(4,70)57(87)24(3)96-44)98-39-11-8-27(15-33(39)68)52(84)50-63(93)75-48(64(94)95)31-18-29(79)19-37(81)45(31)30-13-25(6-9-36(30)80)46(60(90)77-50)74-61(91)47(28)73-59(89)35(20-43(69)82)72-62(49)92/h6-11,13-19,23-24,34-35,42,44,46-54,56-57,65,71,78-81,83-87H,12,20-22,70H2,1-5H3,(H2,69,82)(H,72,92)(H,73,89)(H,74,91)(H,75,93)(H,76,88)(H,77,90)(H,94,95)/t24-,34+,35-,42+,44-,46+,47+,48-,49+,50-,51+,52+,53+,54-,56+,57+,65-,66-/m0/s1; Key:MYPYJXKWCTUITO-LYRMYLQWSA-N

Vancomycin is a glycopeptide antibiotic medication used to treat certain bacterial infections. It is administered intravenously (injection into a vein) to treat complicated skin infections, bloodstream infections, endocarditis, bone and joint infections, and meningitis caused by methicillin-resistant Staphylococcus aureus (medications used to treat MRSA). Blood levels may be measured to determine the correct dose. Vancomycin is also taken orally (by mouth) to treat Clostridioides difficile infections. When taken orally, it is poorly absorbed.

Common side effects include pain at the injection site and allergic reactions. Occasionally, hearing loss, low blood pressure, or bone marrow suppression occur. Safety in pregnancy is not clear, but no evidence of harm has been found, and it is likely safe for use when breastfeeding. It is a type of glycopeptide antibiotic and works by blocking the construction of a cell wall.

Vancomycin was approved for medical use in the United States in 1958. It is on the World Health Organization's List of Essential Medicines. The WHO classifies vancomycin as critically important for human medicine. It is available as a generic medication. Vancomycin is made by the soil bacterium Amycolatopsis orientalis.

== Medical uses ==
Vancomycin is indicated for the treatment of serious, life-threatening infections by Gram-positive bacteria of both aerobic and anaerobic types that are unresponsive to other antibiotics.

The increasing emergence of vancomycin-resistant enterococci (VRE) has resulted in the development of guidelines for use by the Centers for Disease Control Hospital Infection Control Practices Advisory Committee. These guidelines restrict use of vancomycin to these indications:

- treatment of serious infections caused by susceptible organisms resistant to penicillins, such as methicillin-resistant S. aureus (MRSA) and multidrug-resistant S. epidermidis (MRSE),
- treatment of infections in individuals with serious allergy to penicillins,
- treatment of pseudomembranous colitis caused by C. difficile; in particular, in cases of relapse or where the infection is unresponsive to metronidazole treatment (for this indication, vancomycin is given orally rather than intravenously),
- treatment of infections caused by Gram-positive microorganisms in patients with serious allergies to beta-lactam antimicrobials,
- antibacterial prophylaxis for endocarditis after certain procedures in penicillin-hypersensitive people at high risk,
- surgical prophylaxis for major procedures involving implantation of prostheses in institutions with a high rate of MRSA or MRSE,
- early in treatment as an empiric antibiotic for possible MRSA infection while waiting for culture identification of the infecting organism,
- halting the progression of primary sclerosing cholangitis and preventing symptoms; vancomycin does not cure the patient and success is limited,
- treatment of endophthalmitis by intravitreal injection for Gram-positive bacteria coverage; it has been used to prevent the condition but is not recommended due to the risk of side effects.

=== Spectrum of susceptibility ===
Vancomycin is a last-resort medication for the treatment of sepsis and lower respiratory tract, skin, and bone infections caused by Gram-positive bacteria. The minimum inhibitory concentration susceptibility data for a few medically significant bacteria are:

- S. aureus: 0.25 μg/mL to 4.0 μg/mL
- S. aureus (methicillin resistant or MRSA): 1 μg/mL to 138 μg/mL
- S. epidermidis: ≤0.12 μg/mL to 6.25 μg/mL

Although once described as narrow-spectrum, numerous studies have now shown that vancomycin decreases the levels of a wide spectrum of bacteria, including members of the Gram-negative Bacteroidota that are important in the human gut.

== Side effects ==
=== Oral administration ===
Common side effects associated with oral vancomycin administration (used to treat intestinal infections) include:

- gastrointestinal adverse effects (such as abdominal pain and nausea);
- dysgeusia (distorted sense of taste), in case of administration of vancomycin oral solution, but not in case of vancomycin capsules.

=== Intravenous administration ===
Serum vancomycin levels may be monitored in an effort to reduce side effects, but the value of such monitoring has been questioned. Peak and trough levels are usually monitored, and for research purposes the area under the concentration curve is also sometimes used. Toxicity is best monitored by looking at trough values. Immunoassays are commonly used to measure vancomycin levels.

Common adverse drug reactions (≥1% of patients) associated with intravenous vancomycin include:

- pain, redness, or swelling at the injection site;
- vancomycin flushing syndrome (VFS), previously known as red man syndrome (or "redman syndrome");
- thrombophlebitis, which is common when administered through peripheral catheters but not when central venous catheters are used, although central venous catheters are a predisposing factor for upper-extremity deep-vein thrombosis.

Damage to the kidneys (nephrotoxicity) and to the hearing (ototoxicity) were side effects of the early, impure versions of vancomycin, and were prominent in clinical trials conducted in the mid-1950s. Later trials using purer forms of vancomycin found nephrotoxicity is an infrequent adverse effect (0.1% to 1% of patients), but this is accentuated in the presence of aminoglycosides.

Rare adverse effects associated with intravenous vancomycin (<0.1% of patients) include anaphylaxis, toxic epidermal necrolysis, erythema multiforme, superinfection, thrombocytopenia, neutropenia, leukopenia, tinnitus, dizziness and/or ototoxicity, and DRESS syndrome.

Vancomycin can induce platelet-reactive antibodies in the patient, leading to severe thrombocytopenia and bleeding with florid petechial hemorrhages, ecchymoses, and wet purpura.

Historically, vancomycin has been considered a nephrotoxic and ototoxic drug, based on numerous case reports in the medical literature following initial approval by the FDA in 1958. But as its use increased with the spread of MRSA beginning in the 1970s, toxicity risks were reassessed. With the removal of impurities present in earlier formulations of the drug, and with the introduction of therapeutic drug monitoring, the risk of severe toxicity has been reduced.

==== Nephrotoxicity ====
The extent of nephrotoxicity for vancomycin remains controversial. In the 1980s, vancomycin with a purity > 90% was available, and kidney toxicity defined by an increase in serum creatinine of at least 0.5 mg/dL occurred in only about 5% of patients. But dosing guidelines from the 1980s until 2008 recommended vancomycin trough concentrations between 5 and 15 μg/mL. Concern for treatment failures prompted recommendations for higher dosing (troughs 15 to 20 μg/mL) for serious infection, and acute kidney injury (AKI) rates attributable to the vancomycin increased.

Importantly, the risk of AKI increases with co-administration of other known nephrotoxins, in particular aminoglycosides. Furthermore, the sort of infections treated with vancomycin may also cause AKI, and sepsis is the most common cause of AKI in critically ill patients. Finally, studies in humans are mainly associations studies, where the cause of AKI is usually multifactorial.

Animal studies have demonstrated that higher doses and longer duration of vancomycin exposure correlates with increased histopathologic damage and elevations in urinary biomarkers of AKI.37-38 Damage is most prevalent at the proximal tubule, which is further supported by urinary biomarkers, such as kidney injury molecule-1 (KIM-1), clusterin, and osteopontin (OPN). In humans, insulin-like growth factor binding protein 7 (IGFBP7) as part of the nephrocheck test.

The mechanisms underlying the pathogenesis of vancomycin nephrotoxicity are multifactorial but include interstitial nephritis, tubular injury due to oxidative stress, and cast formation.

Therapeutic drug monitoring can be used during vancomycin therapy to minimize the risk of nephrotoxicity associated with excessive drug exposure. Immunoassays are commonly utilized for measuring vancomycin levels.

In children, concomitant administration of vancomycin and piperacillin/tazobactam has been associated with an elevated incidence of AKI relative to other antibiotic regimens.

==== Ototoxicity ====
Attempts to establish rates of vancomycin-induced ototoxicity are even more difficult due to lack of good data. The consensus is that clearly related cases of vancomycin ototoxicity are rare. The association between vancomycin serum levels and ototoxicity is also uncertain. Cases of ototoxicity have been reported in patients whose vancomycin serum level exceeded 80 μg/mL, but cases have also been reported in patients with therapeutic levels. Thus it remains unknown whether therapeutic drug monitoring of vancomycin for the purpose of maintaining "therapeutic" levels prevents ototoxicity. Still, therapeutic drug monitoring can be used during vancomycin therapy to minimize the risk of ototoxicity associated with excessive drug exposure.

==== Interactions with other nephrotoxins ====
Another area of controversy and uncertainty is whether and to what extent vancomycin increases the toxicity of other nephrotoxins. Clinical studies have yielded various results, but animal models indicate that the nephrotoxic effect probably increases when vancomycin is added to nephrotoxins such as aminoglycosides. A dose- or serum level-effect relationship has not been established.

==== Vancomycin flushing reaction ====
Vancomycin is recommended to be administered in a dilute solution slowly, over at least 60 min (maximum rate of 10 mg/min for doses >500 mg) due to the high incidence of pain and thrombophlebitis and to avoid an infusion reaction known as vancomycin flushing reaction. This phenomenon has been often clinically referred to as "red man syndrome". The reaction usually appears within 4 to 10 min after the commencement or soon after the completion of an infusion and is characterized by flushing and/or an erythematous rash that affects the face, neck, and upper torso, attributed to the release of histamine from mast cells. This reaction is caused by the interaction of vancomycin with MRGPRX2, a GPCR-mediating IgE-independent mast cell degranulation. Less frequently, hypotension and angioedema occur. Symptoms may be treated or prevented with antihistamines, including diphenhydramine, and are less likely to occur with slow infusion.

== Dosing considerations ==
The recommended intravenous dosage in adults is 500 mg every 6 hours or 1000 mg every 12 hours, with modification to achieve a therapeutic range as needed. The recommended oral dosage in the treatment of antibiotic-induced pseudomembranous enterocolitis is 125 to 500 mg every 6 hours for 7 to 10 days.

Dose optimization and target attainment of vancomycin in children involves adjusting the dosage to maximize effectiveness while minimizing the risk of adverse effects, specifically acute kidney injury. Dose optimization is achieved by therapeutic drug monitoring (TDM), which allows measurement of vancomycin levels in the blood. TDM using area under the curve (AUC)-guided dosing, preferably with Bayesian forecasting, is recommended to ensure that the AUC0-24h/minimal inhibitory concentration (MIC) ratio is maintained above a certain threshold (400–600) associated with optimal efficacy.

== Routes of administration ==
In the United States, vancomycin is approved by the Food and Drug Administration for intravenous and oral administration.

=== Intravenous ===
Vancomycin must be given intravenously for systemic therapy since it is poorly absorbed from the intestine. Vancomycin is a large hydrophilic molecule that partitions poorly across the gastrointestinal mucosa. Due to its short half-life, it is often injected twice daily.

=== Oral ===
The only approved indication for oral vancomycin therapy is in the treatment of pseudomembranous colitis, where it must be given orally to reach the site of infection in the colon. After oral administration, the fecal concentration of vancomycin is around 500 μg/mL (sensitive strains of Clostridioides difficile have a mean inhibitory concentration of ≤2 μg/mL)

=== Inhaled (off-label) ===
Inhaled vancomycin can also be used off-label, via nebulizer, to treat various infections of the upper and lower respiratory tract.

=== Rectal (off-label) ===
Rectal administration is an off-label use of vancomycin for the treatment of Clostridioides difficile infection.

== Therapeutic drug monitoring ==
Plasma level monitoring of vancomycin is necessary due to the drug's biexponential distribution, intermediate hydrophilicity, and potential for ototoxicity and nephrotoxicity, especially in populations with poor renal function and/or increased propensity to bacterial infection. Vancomycin activity is considered time-dependent; that is, antimicrobial activity depends on how long the serum drug concentration exceeds the minimum inhibitory concentration of the target organism. Thus, peak serum levels have not been shown to correlate with efficacy or toxicity; indeed, concentration monitoring is unnecessary in most cases. Circumstances in which therapeutic drug monitoring is warranted include patients receiving concomitant aminoglycoside therapy, patients with (potentially) altered pharmacokinetic parameters, patients on haemodialysis, patients administered high-dose or prolonged treatment, and patients with impaired renal function. In such cases, trough concentrations are measured.

Therapeutic drug monitoring is also used for dose optimization of vancomycin in treating children.

Target ranges for serum vancomycin concentrations have changed over the years. Early authors suggested peak levels of 30 to 40 mg/L and trough levels of 5 to 10 mg/L, but current recommendations are that peak levels need not be measured and that trough levels of 10 to 15 mg/L or 15 to 20 mg/L, depending on the nature of the infection and the specific patient's needs, may be appropriate. Measuring vancomycin concentrations to calculate doses optimizes therapy in patients with augmented renal clearance.

== Chemistry ==
Vancomycin is a branched tricyclic glycosylated nonribosomal peptide produced by the Actinomycetota species Amycolatopsis orientalis (formerly designated Nocardia orientalis).

Vancomycin exhibits atropisomerism—it has multiple chemically distinct rotamers owing to the rotational restriction of some of the bonds. The form present in the drug is the thermodynamically more stable conformer.

== Biosynthesis ==
Vancomycin is made by the soil bacterium Amycolatopsis orientalis.

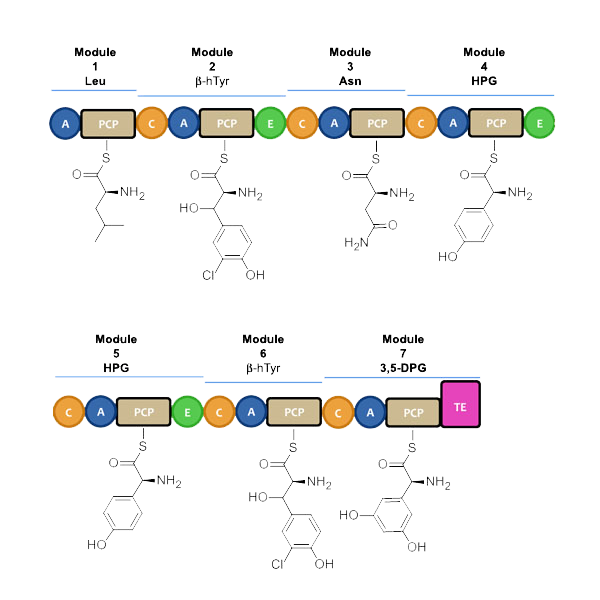
Figure 1: Modules and domains of vancomycin assembly

Vancomycin biosynthesis occurs primarily via three nonribosomal protein syntheses (NRPSs) VpsA, VpsB, and VpsC. The enzymes determine the amino acid sequence during its assembly through its 7 modules. Before vancomycin is assembled through NRPS, the non-proteinogenic amino acids are first synthesized. L-tyrosine is modified to become the β-hydroxytyrosine (β-HT) and 4-hydroxyphenylglycine (4-Hpg) residues. 3,5-dihydroxyphenylglycine ring (3,5-DPG) is derived from acetate.

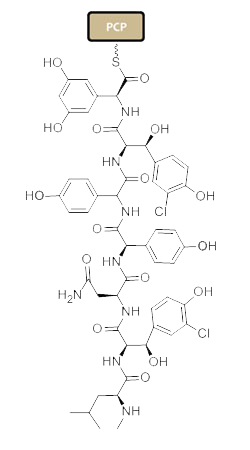
Figure 2: Linear heptapeptide, which consists of modified aromatic rings

Nonribosomal peptide synthesis occurs through distinct modules that can load and extend the protein by one amino acid per module through the amide bond formation at the contact sites of the activating domains. Each module typically consists of an adenylation (A) domain, a peptidyl carrier protein (PCP) domain, and a condensation (C) domain. In the A domain, the specific amino acid is activated by converting into an aminoacyl adenylate enzyme complex attached to a 4'-phosphopantetheine cofactor by thioesterification. The complex is then transferred to the PCP domain with the expulsion of AMP. The PCP domain uses the attached 4'-phosphopantethein prosthetic group to load the growing peptide chain and their precursors. The organization of the modules necessary to biosynthesize vancomycin is shown in Figure 1. In the biosynthesis of vancomycin, additional modification domains are present, such as the epimerization (E) domain, which isomerizes the amino acid from one stereochemistry to another, and a thioesterase domain (TE) is used as a catalyst for cyclization and releases of the molecule via a thioesterase scission.

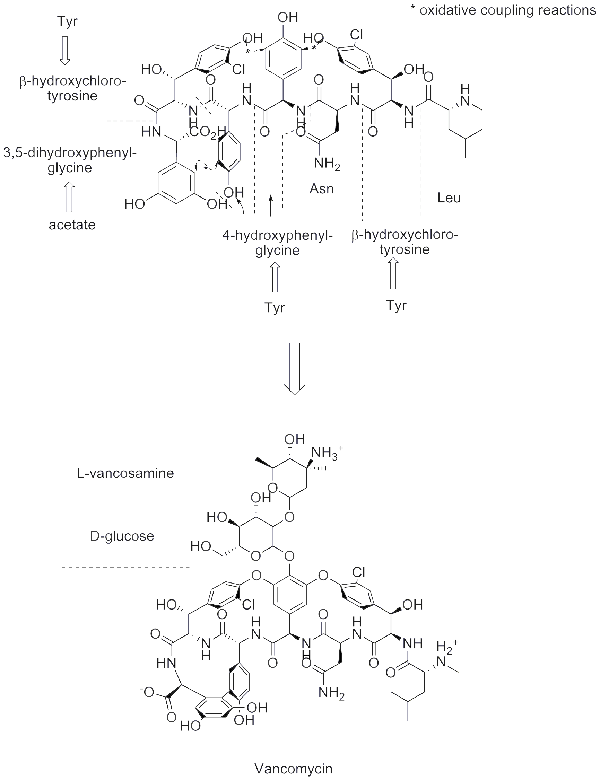
Figure 3: Modifications necessary for vancomycin to become biologically active

A set of NRPS enzymes (peptide synthase VpsA, VpsB, and VpsC) are responsible for assembling the heptapeptide. (Figure 2). VpsA codes for modules 1, 2, and 3. VpsB codes for modules 4, 5, and 6, and VpsC codes for module 7. The vancomycin aglycone contains 4 D-amino acids, although the NRPSs only contain 3 epimerization domains. The origin of D-Leu at residue 1 is unknown. The three peptide syntheses are at the start of the region of the bacterial genome linked with antibiotic biosynthesis, and span 27 kb.

β-hydroxytyrosine (β-HT) is synthesized before incorporation into the heptapeptide backbone. L-tyrosine is activated and loaded on the NRPS VpsD, hydroxylated by OxyD, and released by the thioesterase Vhp. The timing of the chlorination by halogenase VhaA during biosynthesis is undetermined, but is proposed to occur before the complete assembly of the heptapeptide.

After the linear heptapeptide molecule is synthesized, vancomycin must undergo further modifications, such as oxidative cross-linking and glycosylation, in trans by distinct enzymes, referred to as tailoring enzymes, to become biologically active (Figure 3). To convert the linear heptapeptide to cross-linked, glycosylated vancomycin, six enzymes are required. The enzymes OxyA, OxyB, OxyC, and OxyD are cytochrome P450 enzymes. OxyB catalyzes oxidative cross-linking between residues 4 and 6, OxyA between residues 2 and 4, and OxyC between residues 5 and 7. This cross-linking occurs while the heptapeptide is covalently bound to the PCP domain of the 7th NRPS module. These P450s are recruited by the X domain in the 7th NRPS module, which is unique to glycopeptide antibiotic biosynthesis. The cross-linked heptapeptide is then released by the action of the TE domain, and methyltransferase Vmt then N-methylates the terminal leucine residue. GtfE then joins D-glucose to the phenolic oxygen of residue 4, followed by the addition of vancosamine catalyzed by GtfD.

Some of the glycosyltransferases capable of glycosylating vancomycin and related nonribosomal peptides display notable permissivity and have been used to generate libraries of differentially glycosylated analogs through glycorandomization.

== Total synthesis ==
Both the vancomycin aglycone and the complete vancomycin molecule have been targets successfully reached by total synthesis. The target was first achieved by David Evans in October 1998, KC Nicolaou in December 1998, Dale Boger in 1999, and more selectively synthesized again by Boger in 2020.

== Mechanism of action ==
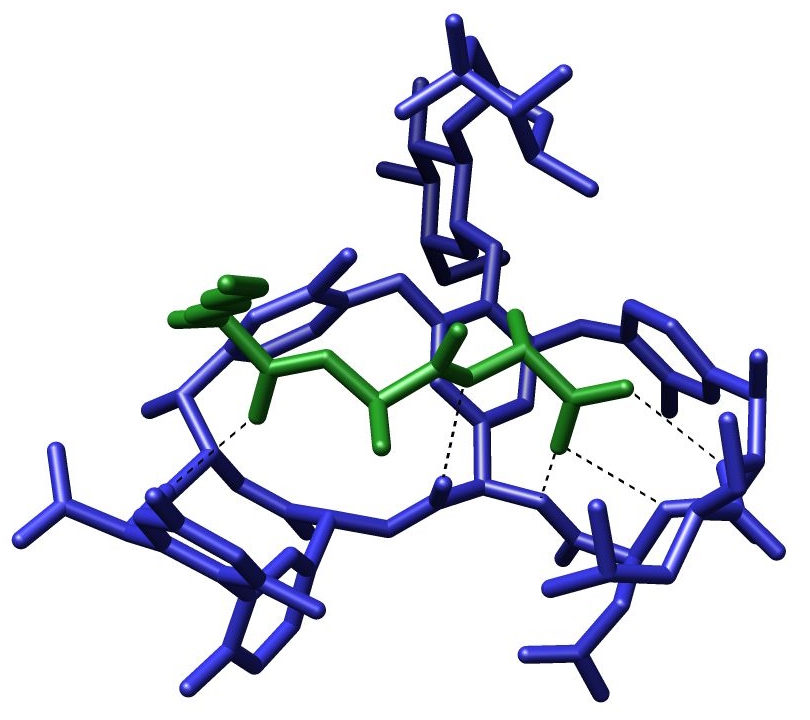
Crystal structure of a short peptide L-Lys-D-Ala-D-Ala (bacterial cell wall precursor, in green) bound to vancomycin (blue) through hydrogen bonds

Vancomycin targets bacterial cell wall synthesis by binding to the basic building block of the bacterial cell wall of Gram-positive bacteria, whether it is of aerobic or anaerobic type. Specifically, vancomycin forms hydrogen bonds with the D-alanyl-D-alanine (D-Ala-D-Ala) peptide motif of the peptidoglycan precursor, a component of the bacterial cell wall.

Peptidoglycan is a polymer that provides structural support to the bacterial cell wall. The peptidoglycan precursor is synthesized in the cytoplasm and then transported across the cytoplasmic membrane to the periplasmic space, where it is assembled into the cell wall. The assembly process involves two enzymatic activities: transglycosylation and transpeptidation. Transglycosylation involves the polymerization of the peptidoglycan precursor into long chains, while transpeptidation involves the cross-linking of these chains to form a three-dimensional mesh-like structure.

Vancomycin inhibits bacterial cell wall synthesis by binding to the D-Ala-D-Ala peptide motif of the peptidoglycan precursor, thereby preventing its processing by the transglycosylase; as such, vancomycin disrupts the transglycosylation activity of the cell wall synthesis process. The disruption leads to an incomplete and corrupted cell wall, which makes the replicating bacteria vulnerable to external forces such as osmotic pressure, so that the bacteria cannot survive and are eliminated by the immune system.

Gram-negative bacteria are insensitive to vancomycin due to their different cell wall morphology. The outer membrane of Gram-negative bacteria contains lipopolysaccharide, which acts as a barrier to vancomycin penetration. This barrier is why vancomycin is mainly used to treat infections caused by Gram-positive bacteria (except some nongonococcal species of Neisseria).

The large hydrophilic molecule of vancomycin is able to form hydrogen bond interactions with the terminal D-alanyl-D-alanine moieties of the NAM/NAG-peptides. Under normal circumstances, this is a five-point interaction. This binding of vancomycin to the D-Ala-D-Ala prevents cell wall synthesis of the long polymers of N-acetylmuramic acid (NAM) and N-acetylglucosamine (NAG) that form the backbone strands of the bacterial cell wall, and prevents the backbone polymers from cross-linking with each other.

Mechanism of vancomycin action and resistance: This diagram shows only one of two ways vancomycin acts against bacteria (inhibition of cell wall cross-linking) and only one of many ways that bacteria can become resistant to it.
1. Vancomycin is added to the bacterial environment while it is trying to synthesize new cell wall. Here, the cell wall strands have been synthesized, but not yet cross-linked.
2. Vancomycin recognizes and binds to the two D-ala residues on the end of the peptide chains. However, in resistant bacteria, the last D-ala residue has been replaced by a D-lactate, so vancomycin cannot bind.
3. In the resistant bacteria, cross-links are successfully formed; still, in the nonresistant (sensitive) bacteria, the vancomycin bound to the peptide chains prevents them from interacting properly with the cell wall cross-linking enzyme.
4. In the resistant bacteria, stable cross-links are formed. In the sensitive bacteria, cross-links cannot be formed and the cell wall falls apart.

== Plant tissue culture ==
Vancomycin is one of the few antibiotics used in plant tissue culture to eliminate Gram-positive bacterial infection. Vancomycin has relatively low toxicity to plants.

== Antibiotic resistance ==
=== Intrinsic resistance ===
A few Gram-positive bacteria, such as Leuconostoc and Pediococcus, are intrinsically resistant to vancomycin, but they rarely cause disease in humans. Most Lactobacillus species are also intrinsically resistant to vancomycin, except for L. acidophilus and L. delbrueckii, which are sensitive. Other Gram-positive bacteria with intrinsic resistance to vancomycin include Erysipelothrix rhusiopathiae, Weissella confusa, and Clostridium innocuum.

Most Gram-negative bacteria are intrinsically resistant to vancomycin because their outer membranes are impermeable to large glycopeptide molecules (with the exception of some non-gonococcal Neisseria species).

=== Acquired resistance ===
Evolution of microbial resistance to vancomycin is a growing problem, especially in healthcare facilities such as hospitals. While newer alternatives to vancomycin exist, such as linezolid (2000) and daptomycin (2003), the widespread use of vancomycin makes resistance to it a significant worry, especially for individual patients if resistant infections are not quickly identified and the patient continues an ineffective treatment. Vancomycin-resistant Enterococcus emerged in 1986. Vancomycin resistance evolved in more common pathogenic organisms during the 1990s and 2000s, including vancomycin-intermediate S. aureus (VISA) and vancomycin-resistant S. aureus (VRSA). Agricultural use of avoparcin, another similar glycopeptide antibiotic, may have contributed to the evolution of vancomycin-resistant organisms.

One mechanism of resistance to vancomycin involves the alteration to the terminal amino acid residues of the NAM/NAG-peptide subunits, under normal conditions, D-alanyl-D-alanine, to which vancomycin binds. The D-alanyl-D-lactate variation results in the loss of one hydrogen-bonding interaction (4, as opposed to 5 for D-alanyl-D-alanine) possible between vancomycin and the peptide. This loss of just one point of interaction results in a 1000-fold decrease in affinity. The D-alanyl-D-serine variation causes a six-fold loss of affinity between vancomycin and the peptide, likely due to steric hindrance.

In enterococci, this modification appears to be due to the expression of an enzyme that alters the terminal residue. Three main resistance variants have been characterized to date among resistant Enterococcus faecium and E. faecalis populations:

- VanA - enterococcal resistance to vancomycin and teicoplanin; inducible on exposure to these agents
- VanB - lower-level enterococcal resistance; inducible by vancomycin, but strains may remain susceptible to teicoplanin
- VanC - least clinically important; enterococci resistant only to vancomycin; constitutive resistance

A variant of vancomycin has been tested that binds to the resistant D-lactic acid variation in vancomycin-resistant bacterial cell walls and also binds well to the original target (vancomycin-susceptible bacteria).

=== "Regained" vancomycin ===
In 2020 a team at the University Hospital Heidelberg (Germany) regained vancomycin's antibacterial power by modifying the molecule with a cationic oligopeptide. The oligopeptide consists of six arginin units in Position V_{N}. In comparison to the unmodified vancomycin the activity against vancomycin-resistant bacteria could be enhanced by a factor of 1,000. This pharmacon is still in preclinical development.

== History ==
Vancomycin was first isolated in 1953 by a research team led by chemist Edmund Kornfeld at Eli Lilly, from a soil sample provided by missionary William M. Bouw. The sample had been collected in 1952 within a forest on the island of Borneo, after Bouw took over collection duties from the Reverend William W. Conley, who had been a regular contributor to Lilly's global soil screening program since 1948. This program used a network of Christian and Missionary Alliance members to obtain specimens from remote locations to identify novel microorganisms. The organism within the soil that produced the antibiotic was a previously unknown streptomycete originally named Streptomyces orientalis (later reclassified as Amycolatopsis orientalis).

Initially designated as "compound 05865", the substance was identified as a distinct antibiotic on June 18, 1953, when researcher Marvin Hoehn used paper chromatography to establish its unique "fingerprint." Unlike many contemporaneous samples that resulted in the rediscovery of known agents like chloromycetin, 05865 exhibited a novel chromatographic pattern and was found to be water-soluble. One of the most difficult tasks Kornfeld's team faced was purification. The early purification method employed during that time utilized picric acid (a potentially explosive chemical); because of this, an alternate process was developed. However, this new method yielded material with a purity of only 82% and, when solubilized, produced a brown liquid termed "Mississippi mud".

The drug's primary indication was the treatment of penicillin-resistant Staphylococcus aureus. The drug was given to a patient who had developed a severe infection on his foot after surgery which had been unresponsive to multiple antibiotics. The surgical staff had recommended amputation or the use of the new antibiotic. His answer was, "Anything that might save my foot". Due to the spread of the bacteria, a high dosage of the antibiotic 05865 was recommended, 100 mg every eight hours, over five days. After the first day, the heat was decreasing, his white cell count was dropping, and the exudate of his wound was less. During the next seven days, the staphylococci disappeared from the wound, and his foot was free from any sign of infection. Two months later, he left the hospital with an intact foot. The drug was fast-tracked for approval by the Food and Drug Administration due to the clinical need for effective anti-staphylococcal agents and an observed lack of resistance development in serial passage in culture media with the drug. The origins of the generic name vancomycin differ; some sources state the name was is linked to the term "vanquish", with others stating it came from the Latin word "vanesco", which means to vanish or disappear. In 1958, Eli Lilly began marketing vancomycin hydrochloride under the trade name Vancocin.

Vancomycin never became the first-line treatment for S. aureus for several reasons:

1. It possesses poor oral bioavailability, so must be given intravenously for most infections.
2. β-Lactamase-resistant semisynthetic penicillins such as methicillin (and its successors, nafcillin and cloxacillin) were subsequently developed, which have better activity against non-MRSA staphylococci.
3. Early trials used early, impure forms of the drug ("Mississippi mud"), which were found to be toxic to the inner ear and to the kidneys; these findings led to the relegation of vancomycin to a drug of last resort.

In 2004, Eli Lilly licensed Vancocin to ViroPharma in the U.S., Flynn Pharma in the UK, and Aspen Pharmacare in Australia. The patent expired in the early 1980s, and the FDA authorized the sale of several generic versions in the U.S., including from manufacturers Bioniche Pharma, Baxter Healthcare, Sandoz, Akorn-Strides, and Hospira.

== Research ==
The combination of vancomycin powder and povidone-iodine lavage may reduce the risk of periprosthetic joint infection in hip and knee arthroplasties.
