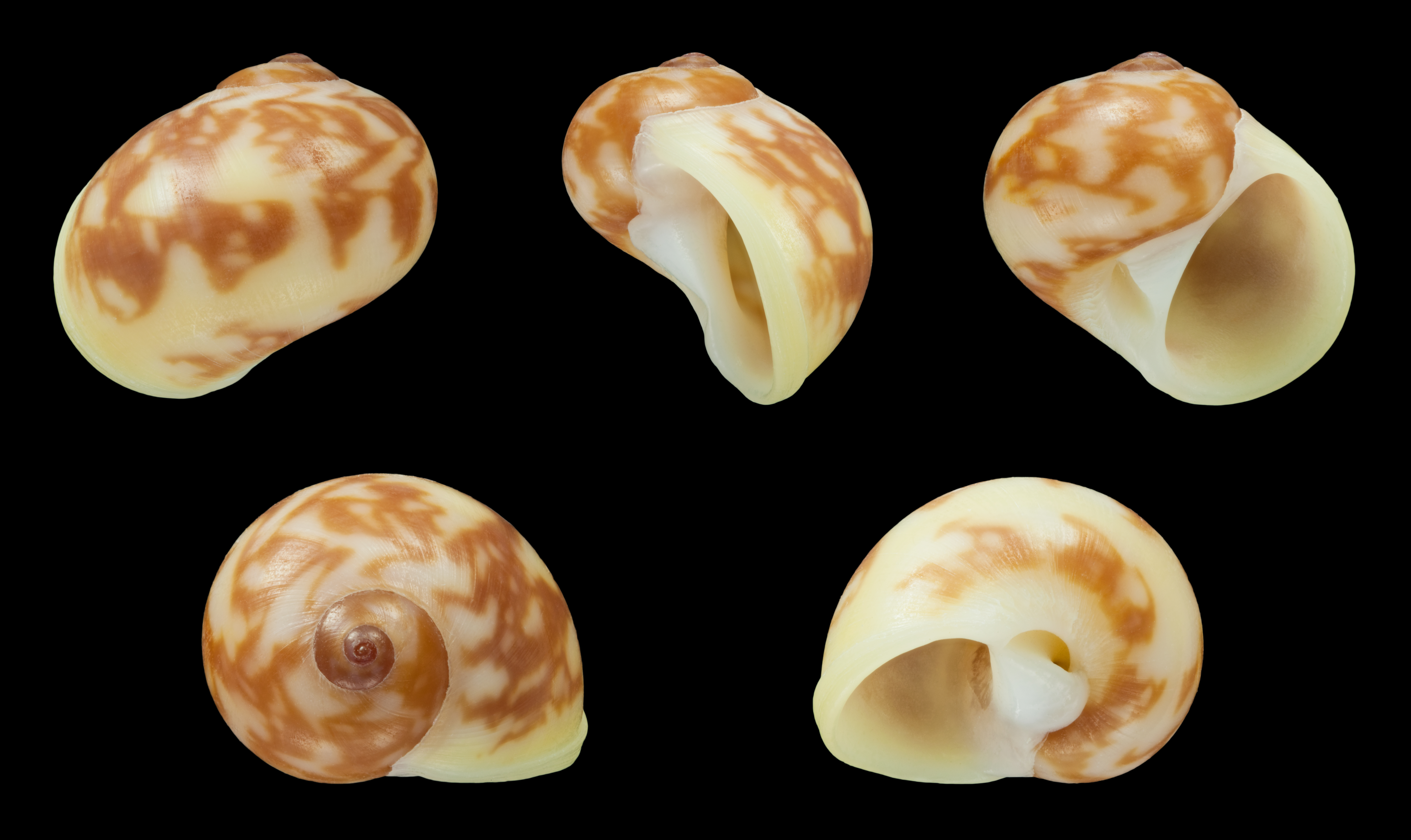
- Several views of a shell of Natica arachnoidea
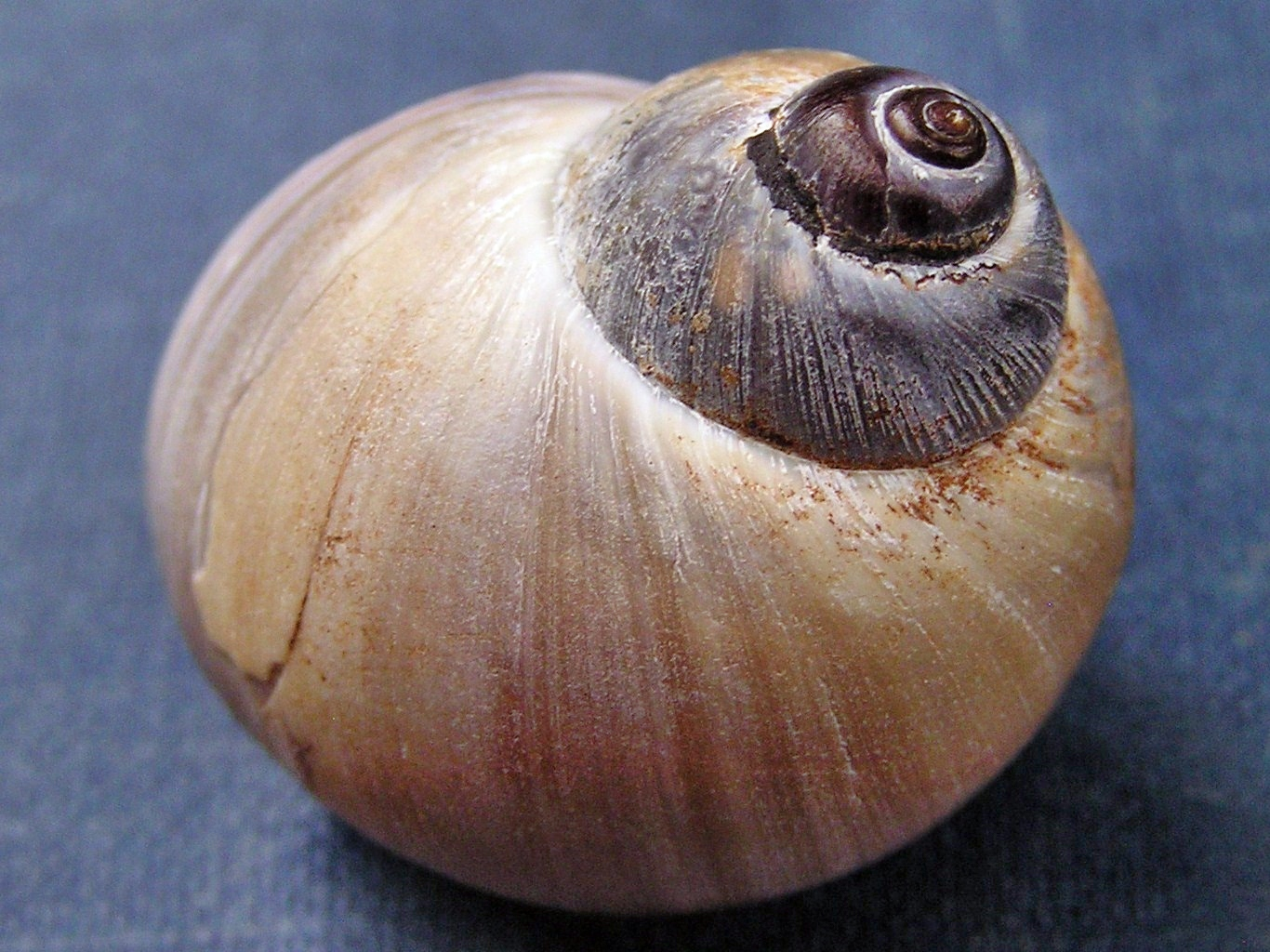
- A shell of Natica limbata

Scientific classification
- Kingdom: Animalia
- Phylum: Mollusca
- Class: Gastropoda
- Subclass: Caenogastropoda
- Order: Littorinimorpha
- Family: Naticidae
- Subfamily: Naticinae
- Genus: Natica; Scopoli, 1777

Type species
- Natica vitellus vitellus Linnaeus, 1758

Synonyms
- Glyphepithema Rehder, 1943; Lunaia S. S. Berry, 1964; Nacca Risso, 1826; Natica (Mamilla) Fabricius, 1823; Natica (Nacca) Risso, 1826; Natica (Natica) Scopoli, 1777 accepted, alternate representation

= Natica =

Natica Temporal range: Eocene - Recent

Genus of gastropods

Natica is a genus of small to medium-sized predatory sea snails, marine gastropods in the subfamily Naticinae of the family Naticidae, the moon snails. The genus was erected by Giovanni Antonio Scopoli in 1777.

The genus is known from the Eocene to the Recent periods (age range: 37.2 to 0.012 million years ago).

== Description ==
The shell is subglobose or obovate, rarely somewhat depressed. The spire is short. The body whorl is enlarged. The aperture is entire, semicircular, with an oblique, edentate, callous columellar side. The prominent umbilicus is deep, often wide, well separated between the contracted columellar margin and the spiral, often thickened base of the columella. A small pit near the callosity is almost distinct.

The peristome is sharp, smooth on the interior. The large operculum is calcareous, fully attached to the surface, sometimes sculpted with ridges, sometimes flattened, with the spiral located anteriorly and internally.

The rounded, solid shell varies from small to large and has a low spire. The surface is smooth or bears radial ribs at the sutures. The aperture is wide and semi-ovate. The umbilicus is deep, posteriorly open or partially covered by the parietal callus.The funicle is weakly to strongly developed, entering the umbilicus either perpendicularly or obliquely. The parietal callus is prominent, occasionally confluent with the funicle.

The Operculum is calcareous, smooth, and bearing one to three marginal ribs. The columellas edge is smooth or serrate.

== Species ==
The World Register of Marine Species (WoRMS) includes the following species with accepted names in the genus Natica

- Natica acinonyx Marche Marchad, 1957
- Natica adansoni Blainville, 1825
- Natica agulhasensis Thiele, 1925
- Natica albospira E. A. Smith, 1895
- Natica anosyensis Bozzetti, 2010
- Natica apertissima E. A. Smith, 1906
- Natica arachnoidea (Gmelin, 1791)
- Natica bibalteata G. B. Sowerby III, 1914
- Natica bouvieri Jousseaume, 1883
- Natica broderipiana Récluz, 1844
- Natica brunneolinea McLean, 1970
- Natica buriasiensis Récluz, 1844
- Natica cabrerai Kase & Shigeta, 2000
- Natica canariensis Odhner, 1932
- Natica candidula E. A. Smith, 1895
- Natica caneloensis Hertlein & Strong, 1955
- Natica castrensis (Dall, 1889)
- Natica colima Strong & Hertlein, 1937
- Natica collaria (Lamarck, 1822)
- Natica concavoperculata Liu, 1977
- Natica couteaudi Rochebrune & Mabille, 1885
- Natica crassoperculata X. Liu, 1977
- Natica crispata Thiele, 1925
- † Natica deshayesiana Nyst, 1845
- Natica dimidiata E. A. Smith, 1906
- Natica dixoni Fernandes & Rolán, 1992
- † Natica elegans J. Sowerby, 1836
- † Natica euthele Tournouër, 1874
- Natica explicatula Sacco, 1891 (uncertain- unassessed)
- Natica fabella Jousseaume, 1884
- Natica fasciata (Röding, 1798)
- Natica forata Reeve, 1855
- Natica forskalii G. B. Sowerby I, 1825
- Natica fulgurans Récluz, 1844
- Natica fulminea Gmelin, 1791
- Natica furva Watson, 1897
- Natica grayi Philippi, 1852
- Natica gruveli Dautzenberg, 1910
- Natica inexpectans Olsson, 1971
- Natica juani Costa & Pastorino, 2012
- Natica jukyriuva Simone, 2014
- Natica kawamurai Sakurai, 1983
- Natica koperbergae van der Bijl & Moolenbeek, 2009
- Natica lacteobasis Kuroda, 1961
- Natica larvaroni P. Bernard, 1983
- Natica limbata d'Orbigny, 1837
- Natica linguifera Thiele, 1925
- Natica livida Pfeiffer, 1840
- Natica luculenta Iredale, 1929
- Natica lunaris (Berry, 1964)
- Natica marchadi Pin, 1992
- Natica marochiensis (Gmelin, 1791)
- † Natica matheroni Deshayes, 1864
- Natica maxiutongi S.-P. Zhang, 2009
- Natica menkeana Philippi, 1851
- Natica michaelis Fischer-Piette, 1942
- Natica monodi Marche-Marchad, 1957
- Natica multipunctata Blainville, 1825
- Natica nipponensis Kuroda, 1961
- Natica oteroi (Fernandes & Rolán, 1991)
- Natica othello Dall, 1908
- Natica pavimentum Récluz, 1844
- Natica perlineata Dall, 1889
- Natica pipoca Simone, 2014
- Natica pluvialis (Kurono, 1999)
- Natica pseustes Watson, 1881
- Natica pulicaris Philippi, 1851
- † Natica pumila G. B. Sowerby I, 1846
- Natica pygmaea Philippi, 1842
- Natica queketti G.B. Sowerby III, 1894
- Natica rocquignyi Fischer-Piette, 1942
- Natica rouxi Nicklès, 1952
- Natica royi Pin, 1992
- Natica rubromaculata E. A. Smith, 1872
- Natica ryalli Fernandes & Rolán, 1992
- Natica saitoi Kuroda & Habe, 1971
- Natica sanctaehelenae E. A. Smith, 1890
- Natica sandwichensis (Dall, 1895)
- Natica sansibarica Thiele, 1925
- Natica scethra Dall, 1908
- Natica schepmani Thiele, 1925
- Natica scopaespira Liu, 1977
- Natica seychellium Watson R.B., 1886
- Natica siberutensis Thiele, 1925
- Natica sigillata McLean, 1970
- Natica simplex G.B. Sowerby III, 1897
- Natica sinensis Ma & Zhang, 1993
- Natica spadicea (Gmelin, 1791)
- Natica spadiceoides Liu, 1977
- Natica stellata Hedley, 1913
- Natica stenopa Woodring, 1957
- † Natica subsolida d'Orbigny, 1847
- † Natica suppleta Finlay, 1927
- Natica tedbayeri Rehder, 1986
- † Natica tremarici Tate, 1900
- Natica turtoni E. A. Smith, 1890
- Natica unibalteata Liu, 1977
- Natica unifasciata Lamarck, 1822
- Natica vitellus (Linnaeus, 1758)

Taxon inquirendum

- Natica gracilis Récluz, 1850
- Natica moquiniana Récluz, 1853
- Natica perscalpta Martens, 1878
- Natica swainsoni Philippi, 1851

== Synonyms ==
List of synonyms of the genus Natica
- Subgenus Natica (Cryptonatica) Dall, 1892: synonym of Cryptonatica Dall, 1892
- Subgenus Natica (Eunaticina) P. Fischer, 1885: synonym of Eunaticina P. Fischer, 1885
- Subgenus Natica (Nacca) Risso, 1826: synonym of Natica Scopoli, 1777
- Subgenus Natica (Natica) Scopoli, 1777 represented as Natica Scopoli, 1777 (alternate representation)
- Subgenus Natica (Naticarius) Duméril, 1805: synonym of Naticarius Duméril, 1805
- Subgenus Natica (Notocochlis): synonym of Notocochlis Powell, 1933
- Subgenus Natica (Payraudeautia) Bucquoy, Dautzenberg & Dollfus, 1883: synonym of Payraudeautia Bucquoy, Dautzenberg & Dollfus, 1883
- Subgenus Natica (Polinices) Montfort, 1810 represented as Polinices Montfort, 1810
- Natica abyssicola E. A. Smith, 1896: synonym of Lunatia abyssicola (E. A. Smith, 1896): synonym of Euspira abyssicola (E. A. Smith, 1896)
- Natica acynonyx [sic]: synonym of Natica acinonyx Marche-Marchad, 1957
- Natica adspersa Menke, 1830: synonym of Naticarius hebraeus (Martyn, 1786)
- Natica affinis (Gmelin, 1791): synonym of Cryptonatica affinis (Gmelin, 1791)
- Natica africana Bartsch, 1915: synonym of Natica queketti Sowerby III, 1894
- Natica alapapilionis (Röding, 1798): synonym of Naticarius alapapilionis (Röding, 1798)
- Natica albifasciata Liu, 1977: synonym of Tanea albifasciata (X. Liu, 1977) (original combination)
- Natica albula Récluz, 1851: synonym of Polinices mammilla (Linnaeus, 1758)
- Natica alderi Forbes, 1838: synonym of Euspira pulchella (Risso, 1826)
- Natica aleutica Dall, 1919: synonym of Cryptonatica aleutica (Dall, 1919)
- Natica alfredensis Bartsch, 1915: synonym of Tectonatica tecta (Anton, 1838)
- Natica algida Gould, 1848: synonym of Cryptonatica affinis (Gmelin, 1791)
- Natica alveata Troschel, 1852: synonym of Polinices alveatus (Troschel, 1852)
- Natica amabilis Locard, 1897: synonym of Euspira subplicata (Jeffreys, 1885)
- Natica amiculata Philippi, 1849: synonym of Polinices amiculatus (Philippi, 1849)
- Natica amphiala Watson, 1881: synonym of Friginatica amphiala (Watson, 1881)
- Natica ampla Philippi, 1849: synonym of Glossaulax didyma ampla (Philippi, 1849)
- Natica ampullaria Lamarck, 1822: synonym of Euspira heros (Say, 1822)
- Natica anderssoni Strebel, 1906: synonym of Amauropsis anderssoni (Strebel, 1906)
- Natica angulata Jeffreys, 1885: synonym of Euspira fusca (Blainville, 1825)
- Natica antoni Philippi, 1851: synonym of Notocochlis gualteriana (Récluz, 1844)
- Natica aperta Lovén, 1846: synonym of Bulbus smithii T. Brown, 1839
- Natica apora Watson, 1881: synonym of Amauropsis apora (Watson, 1881)
- Natica areolata Récluz, 1844: synonym of Tanea areolata (Recluz, 1844)
- Natica asellus Reeve, 1855: synonym of Notocochlis gualteriana (Récluz, 1844)
- Natica atrocyanea Philippi, 1845: synonym of Natica limbata d'Orbigny, 1837
- Natica atypha Watson, 1881: synonym of Natica buriasiensis Récluz, 1844
- Natica aurantia Lamarck, 1822: synonym of Polinices aurantius (Röding, 1798)
- Natica aureolutea Strebel, 1908: synonym of Amauropsis aureolutea (Strebel, 1908)
- Natica aureozona Tomlin, 1921: synonym of Tectonatica tecta (Anton, 1838)
- Natica baconi Reeve, 1855: synonym of Conuber incei (Philippi, 1853)
- Natica bahiensis Récluz, 1850: synonym of Polinices hepaticus (Röding, 1798)
- Natica balteata G.B. Sowerby III, 1914: synonym of Notocochlis gualteriana (Récluz, 1844)
- Natica bathybii Friele, 1879: synonym of Cryptonatica bathybii (Friele, 1879)
- Natica bayeri Rehder, 1986: synonym of Natica tedbayeri Rehder, 1986: synonym of Glyphepithema floridana Rehder, 1943
- Natica beddomei Johnston, 1885: synonym of Friginatica beddomei (Johnston, 1885)
- Natica bernardii Récluz, 1851: synonym of Mammilla bernardii (Récluz, 1851)
- Natica bicincta Récluz, 1850: synonym of Mammilla melanostomoides (Quoy & Gaimard, 1833)
- Natica bicolor Philippi, 1849: synonym of Glossaulax petiveriana (Récluz, 1843)
- Natica bifasciata Gray in Griffith & Pidgeon, 1833: synonym of Polinices bifasciatus (Gray in Griffith & Pidgeon, 1833)
- Natica bonplandi Valenciennes, 1832: synonym of Hypterita helicoides (Gray, 1825)
- Natica borealis Gray, 1839: synonym of Euspira pallida (Broderip & Sowerby, 1829)
- Natica bougei G.B. Sowerby III, 1908: synonym of Tectonatica bougei (G.B. Sowerby III, 1908); synonym of Tectonatica venustula (Philippi, 1851)
- Natica bourguignati Récluz, 1852: synonym of Natica fulminea (Gmelin, 1791)
- Natica brachya Locard, 1897: synonym of Amauropsis brassiculina (Locard, 1897)
- Natica brassiculina Locard, 1897: synonym of Amauropsis brassiculina (Locard, 1897)
- Natica brocchiana Philippi, 1851: synonym of Euspira fusca (Blainville, 1825)
- Natica brunnea Link, 1807: synonym of Polinices hepaticus (Röding, 1798)
- Natica brunoi P. Bernard, 1983: synonym of Natica rubromaculata E. A. Smith, 1872
- Natica bullula Locard, 1897: synonym of Amauropsis brassiculina (Locard, 1897)
- Natica burnupi E.A. Smith, 1903: synonym of Notocochlis gualteriana (Récluz, 1844)
- Natica cailliaudii Récluz, 1850: synonym of Natica pavimentum Récluz, 1844
- Natica campeachiensis Récluz in Reeve, 1855: synonym of Neverita duplicata (Say, 1822)
- Natica campechiensis Récluz in Chenu, 1843: synonym of Neverita duplicata (Say, 1822)
- Natica canaliculata Gould, 1840: synonym of Amauropsis islandica (Gmelin, 1791)
- Natica cancellata Swainson, 1840: synonym of Sigaretus mammilaris Récluz in Chenu, 1843
- Natica candidissima Le Guillou, 1842: synonym of Polinices candidissimus (Le Guillou, 1842)
- Natica candidissima Récluz, 1851: synonym of Polinices porcelanus (d'Orbigny, 1839)
- Natica caprae Philippi, 1852: synonym of Mammilla caprae (Philippi, 1852)
- Natica caribaea Philippi, 1851: synonym of Polinices lacteus (Guilding, 1834)
- Natica carinifera Koch in Philippi, 1852: synonym of Natica vittata (Gmelin, 1791)
- Natica castanea Lamarck, 1822: synonym of Euspira catena (da Costa, 1778)
- Natica catena (da Costa, 1778) - necklace shell: synonym of Euspira catena (da Costa, 1778)
- Natica catenata Philippi, 1853: synonym of Natica grayi Philippi, 1852
- Natica catenata Locard, 1886: synonym of Euspira catena (da Costa, 1778)
- Natica caurina Gould, 1847: synonym of Euspira pallida (Broderip & Sowerby, 1829)
- Natica cayennensis Récluz, 1850: synonym of Stigmaulax cayennensis (Récluz, 1850)
- Natica cernica Jousseaume, 1874: synonym of Notocochlis cernica (Jousseaume, 1874)
- Natica chemnitzii Récluz in Reeve, 1885: synonym of Neverita aulacoglossa (Pilsbry & Vanatta, 1909)
- Natica chemnitzii Récluz in Chenu, 1843: synonym of Neverita didyma (Röding, 1798)
- Natica chemnitzii L. Pfeiffer, 1840: synonym of Notocochlis chemnitzii (L. Pfeiffer, 1840)
- Natica chinensis Lamarck, 1816: synonym of Naticarius onca (Röding, 1798)
- Natica cincta Récluz, 1850: synonym of Natica pulicaris Philippi, 1851
- Natica cinnamomea Menke, 1830: synonym of Natica fasciata (Röding, 1798)
- Natica citrina Philippi, 1851: synonym of Polinices citrinus (Philippi, 1851)
- Natica clausa Broderip & Sowerby G.B. I, 1829: synonym of Cryptonatica affinis (Gmelin, 1791)
- Natica clausiformis (Oyama, 1969): synonym of Cryptonatica affinis (Gmelin, 1791)
- Natica clavata G. B. Sowerby II, 1883: synonym of Polinices peselephanti (Link, 1807)
- Natica collei [sic]: synonym of Naticarius colliei (Récluz, 1844)
- Natica colliei Récluz, 1844: synonym of Naticarius colliei (Récluz, 1844)
- Natica columnaris Récluz, 1850: synonym of Polinices peselephanti (Link, 1807)
- Natica compacta Jeffreys, 1885: synonym of Euspira fusca (Blainville, 1825)
- Natica complanata Locard, 1886: synonym of Euspira nitida (Donovan, 1804)
- Natica conica Lamarck, 1822: synonym of Conuber conicum (Lamarck, 1822)
- Natica consolidata Couthouy, 1838: synonym of Cryptonatica affinis (Gmelin, 1791)
- Natica cora d'Orbigny, 1840: synonym of Polinices cora (d'Orbigny, 1840)
- Natica cornea Möller, 1842: synonym of Amauropsis islandica (Gmelin, 1791)
- Natica costulata Quoy & Gaimard, 1833: synonym of Eunaticina papilla (Gmelin, 1791)
- Natica crassa Schepman, 1909: synonym of Natica arachnoidea (Gmelin, 1791)
- Natica crassatella Locard, 1886: synonym of Euspira intricata (Donovan, 1804)
- Natica crosseana Weinkauff, 1868: synonym of Megalomphalus azoneus (Brusina, 1865)
- Natica cruentata Lamarck, 1822: synonym of Natica fulminea (Gmelin, 1791)
- Natica cubana Dall, 1927: synonym of Stigmaulax sulcatus (Born, 1778)
- Natica cumingiana Récluz, 1844: synonym of Vanikoro cumingiana (Récluz, 1844)
- Natica cygnea Philippi, 1852: synonym of Polinices mammilla (Linnaeus, 1758)
- Natica cymba Menke, 1828: synonym of Sinum cymba (Menke, 1828)
- Natica decipiens E.A. Smith, 1904: synonym of Natica simplex Sowerby, 1897
- Natica deiodosa Reeve, 1855: synonym of Polinices aurantius (Röding, 1798)
- Natica delessertiana Récluz, 1843: synonym of Neverita delessertiana (Récluz, 1843)
- Natica delicatula E. A. Smith, 1902: synonym of Kerguelenatica delicatula (E. A. Smith, 1902)
- Natica depressa Gray, 1839: synonym of Natica grayi Philippi, 1852
- Natica didyma Bolten: synonym of Polinices didyma (Röding, 1798)
- Natica dillwynii Payraudeau, 1826: synonym of Notocochlis dillwynii (Payraudeau, 1826)
- Natica donghaiensis Ma & Zhang, 1994: synonym of Naticarius donghaiensis (X.-T. Ma & S.-P. Zhang, 2003)
- Natica draparnaudii Récluz, 1851: synonym of Polinices aurantius (Röding, 1798)
- Natica dubia Récluz, 1844: synonym of Polinices constanti Huelsken & Hollmann, 2012
- Natica duplicata Say, 1822: synonym of Neverita duplicata (Say, 1822)
- Natica eburnea Deshayes, 1838: synonym of Naticarius orientalis (Gmelin, 1791)
- Natica effosa Watson, 1886: synonym of Friginatica beddomei (Johnston, 1885)
- Natica elegans Récluz, 1850: synonym of Natica picta Récluz, 1844
- Natica elenae Récluz, 1844: synonym of Stigmaulax elenae (Récluz, 1844)
- Natica elkingtoni Hedley & May, 1908: synonym of Tectonatica shorehami (Pritchard & Gatliff, 1900)
- Natica euzona Recluz, 1844: synonym of Tanea euzona (Recluz, 1844)
- Natica extenta Locard, 1897: synonym of Euspira subplicata (Jeffreys, 1885)
- Natica exulans Gould, 1841: synonym of Amauropsis islandica (Gmelin, 1791)
- Natica falklandica Preston, 1913: synonym of Falsilunatia falklandica (Preston, 1913)
- Natica fanel Recluz, 1844: synonym of Natica multipunctata Fischer-Piette, 1942
- Natica fanel (Röding, 1798): synonym of Natica hebraea (Martyn, 1786), synonym of Naticarius hebraeus (Martyn, 1786)
- Natica fartilis Watson, 1881: synonym of Falsilunatia fartilis (Watson, 1881)
- Natica fibrosa Gray, 1850: synonym of Mammilla fibrosa (Gray, 1850)
- Natica fibrosa Souleyet, 1852: synonym of Natica fibrosa Gray, 1850: synonym of Mammilla fibrosa (Gray, 1850)
- Natica fibula Reeve, 1855: synonym of Conuber incei (Philippi, 1853)
- Natica filosa Reeve, 1855: synonym of Mammilla fibrosa (Gray, 1850)
- Natica filosa Philippi, 1845: synonym of Tectonatica sagraiana (d'Orbigny, 1842)
- Natica flammulata Requien, 1848: synonym of Tectonatica sagraiana (d'Orbigny, 1842)
- Natica flava Gould, 1839: synonym of Bulbus smithii T. Brown, 1839
- Natica flemingiana Récluz, 1844: synonym of Polinices flemingianus (Recluz, 1844)
- Natica fortunei Reeve, 1855: synonym of Laguncula pulchella Benson, 1842
- Natica fossar Bucquoy, Dautzenberg & Dollfus, 1884: synonym of Fossarus ambiguus (Linnaeus, 1758)
- Natica fossata Gould, 1847: synonym of Neverita delessertiana (Récluz, 1843)
- Natica fragilis Leach, 1819: synonym of Bulbus fragilis (Leach, 1819)
- Natica fringilla Dall, 1881: synonym of Euspira fringilla (Dall, 1881)
  - Natica fulminea cruentata (Gmelin, 1790): synonym of Natica fulminea (Gmelin, 1790)
- Natica funiculata Récluz, 1850: synonym of Polinices peselephanti (Link, 1807)
- Natica fusca Blainville, 1825: synonym of Euspira fusca (Blainville, 1825)
- Natica fuscata Récluz, 1844: synonym of Polinices hepaticus (Röding, 1798)
- Natica galactites Philippi, 1851: synonym of Polinices flemingianus (Recluz, 1844)
- Natica gallapagosa Récluz, 1844: synonym of Polinices otis (Broderip & Sowerby, 1829)
- Natica gambiae Récluz, 1844: synonym of Natica collaria Lamarck, 1822
- Natica genuana Reeve, 1855: synonym of Tectonatica tecta (Anton, 1838)
- Natica georgiana Strebel, 1908: synonym of Amauropsis georgiana (Strebel, 1908)
- Natica gilva Philippi, 1851: synonym of Laguncula pulchella Benson, 1842
- Natica glauca Lesson, 1830: synonym of Hypterita helicoides (Gray, 1825)
- Natica globosa Jeffreys, 1885: synonym of Semicassis saburon (Bruguière, 1792)
- Natica godfroyi Lamy, 1910: synonym of Amauropsis godfroyi (Lamy, 1910)
- Natica gouldii C. B. Adams, 1847: synonym of Amauropsis islandica (Gmelin, 1791)
- Natica grisea Martens, 1878: synonym of Kerguelenatica bioperculata Dell, 1990: synonym of Kerguelenatica delicatula (E. A. Smith, 1902)
- Natica grisea Requien, 1848: synonym of Euspira intricata (Donovan, 1804)
- Natica groenlandica Beck, 1847: synonym of Euspira montagui (Forbes, 1838)
- Natica groenlandica Möller, 1842: synonym of Euspira pallida (Broderip & Sowerby, 1829)
- Natica gruneriana Philippi, 1852: synonym of Polinices grunerianus (Philippi, 1852)
- Natica gruveli Dautzenberg, 1910: synonym of Payraudeautia gruveli (Dautzenberg, 1910)
- Natica gualteriana Récluz, 1844: synonym of Notocochlis gualteriana Récluz, 1844
- Natica gualtieriana Couturier, 1907: synonym of Natica gualteriana Récluz, 1844
- Natica guesti Harasewych & Jensen, 1984: synonym of Notocochlis guesti (Harasewych & Jensen, 1984)
- Natica guilleminii Payraudeau, 1826: synonym of Euspira guilleminii (Payraudeau, 1826)
- Natica haneti Récluz, 1850: synonym of Stigmaulax elenae (Récluz, 1844)
- Natica hannanensis Liu, 1977: synonym of Naticarius hainanensis (X. Liu, 1977)
- Natica haweraensis Marwick, 1924: synonym of † Taniella planisuturalis (Marwick, 1924)
- Natica hebraea (Martyn, 1784): synonym of Naticarius hebraeus (Martyn, 1786)
- Natica helicoides Johnston, 1835: synonym of Amauropsis islandica (Gmelin, 1791)
- Natica helicoides Gray, 1825: synonym of Hypterita helicoides (Gray, 1825)
- Natica helvacea Lamarck, 1822: synonym of Natica spadicea (Gmelin, 1791)
- Natica heros Say, 1822: synonym of Euspira heros (Say, 1822)
- Natica hilaris G. B. Sowerby, 1914: synonym of Tanea hilaris (G. B. Sowerby, III, 1914)
- Natica hirasei Pilsbry, 1905: synonym of Cryptonatica hirasei (Pilsbry, 1905)
- Natica idiopoma Pilsbry & Lowe, 1932: synonym of Glyphepithema idiopoma (Pilsbry & H. N. Lowe, 1932)
- Natica immaculata Totten, 1835: synonym of Polinices immaculatus (Totten, 1835)
- Natica imperforata Gray, 1839: synonym of Tectonatica tecta (Anton, 1838)
- Natica imperforata Jay, 1836: synonym of Globularia fluctuata (G.B. Sowerby I, 1825)
- Natica impervia Philippi, 1845: synonym of Tectonatica impervia (Philippi, 1845)
- Natica incei Philippi, 1853: synonym of Conuber incei (Philippi, 1853)
- Natica incisa Philippi, 1852: synonym of Glossaulax vesicalis (Philippi, 1849)
- Natica insecta Jousseaume, 1874: synonym of Naticarius insecta (Jousseaume, 1874)
- Natica insularum Watson, 1886: synonym of Notocochlis insularum (Watson, 1886)
- Natica intemerata Philippi, 1853: synonym of Polinices intemeratus (Philippi, 1853)
- Natica intermedia Récluz, 1843: synonym of Polinices mammilla (Linnaeus, 1758)
- Natica intermedia Philippi, 1836: synonym of Euspira nitida (Donovan, 1804)
- Natica intricata (Donovan, 1804): synonym of Euspira intricata (Donovan, 1804)
- Natica intricatoides Hidalgo, 1873: synonym of Natica vittata (Gmelin, 1791)
- Natica isabelleana d'Orbigny, 1840: synonym of Notocochlis isabelleana (d'Orbigny, 1840)
- Natica jamaicensis C. B. Adams, 1850: synonym of Natica livida Pfeiffer, 1840
- Natica josephinia (Risso, 1826): synonym of Neverita josephinia Risso, 1826
- Natica joubini Lamy, 1911: synonym of Falsilunatia joubini (Lamy, 1911)
- Natica jousseaumei Euthyme, 1885: synonym of Notocochlis cernica (Jousseaume, 1874)
- Natica jukesii Reeve, 1855: synonym of Polinices jukesii (Reeve, 1855)
- Natica kempi Preston, 1916: synonym of Natica buriasiensis Récluz, 1844
- Natica kingensis May, 1924: synonym of Laevilitorina kingensis (May, 1924)
- Natica kowiensis Turton, 1932: synonym of Natica simplex Sowerby III, 1897
- Natica kraussi E. A. Smith, 1902: synonym of Eunaticina kraussi (E. A. Smith, 1902)
- Natica labrella Lamarck, 1822: synonym of Natica collaria Lamarck, 1822
- Natica labrotincta Sowerby, 1900: synonym of Tectonatica suffusa (Reeve, 1855)
- Natica lacernula d'Orbigny, 1842: synonym of Natica livida Pfeiffer, 1840
- Natica lactea (Guilding, 1834): synonym of Polinices lacteus (Guilding, 1834)
- Natica laevis Hutton, 1885: synonym of Globisinum drewi (Murdoch, 1899)
- Natica lamarckiana Récluz in Reeve, 1855: synonym of Neverita didyma (Röding, 1798)
- Natica lamarckii Récluz in Chenu, 1843: synonym of Neverita didyma (Röding, 1798)
- Natica largillierti Récluz, 1852 accepted as Bulbus fragilis (Leach, 1819)
- Natica lavendula Woolacott, 1956: synonym of Natica pseustes Watson, 1881
- Natica lemnisciata Philippi, 1852: synonym of Natica marochiensis (Gmelin, 1791)
- Natica leptalea Watson, 1881: synonym of Polinices leptaleus (Watson, 1881)
- Natica leucophaea Reeve, 1855: synonym of Conuber sordidum (Swainson, 1821)
- Natica levicula A. E. Verrill, 1880: synonym of Euspira levicula (A. E. Verrill, 1880)
- Natica levis E. A. Smith, 1896: synonym of Euspira levis (E. A. Smith, 1896)
- Natica lewisii Gould, 1847: synonym of Neverita lewisii (Gould, 1847)
- Natica limacina Jousseaume, 1874: synonym of Natica marochiensis (Gmelin, 1791)
- Natica lineata (Röding, 1798): synonym of Tanea lineata (Röding, 1798)
- Natica lineolata Philippi, 1844: synonym of Tectonatica sagraiana (d'Orbigny, 1842)
- Natica lineozona Jousseaume, 1874: synonym of Naticarius lineozonus (Jousseaume, 1874)
- Natica listeri Philippi, 1850: synonym of Neverita duplicata (Say, 1822)
- Natica litterata Link, 1807: synonym of Naticarius onca (Röding, 1798)
- Natica locellus Reeve, 1855: synonym of Notocochlis gualteriana (Récluz, 1844)
- Natica lupinus Deshayes, 1838: synonym of Natica fasciata (Röding, 1798)
- Natica macilenta Philippi, 1844: synonym of Euspira macilenta (Philippi, 1844)
- Natica macrostoma Philippi, 1852: synonym of Mammilla melanostomoides (Quoy & Gaimard, 1832)
- Natica macrotremis A. Adams & Reeve, 1850: synonym of Eunaticina umbilicata (Quoy & Gaimard, 1832)
- Natica maculata von Salis, 1793: synonym of Naticarius hebraeus (Martyn, 1786)
- Natica maculata Deshayes, 1838: synonym of Naticarius hebraeus (Martyn, 1786)
- Natica maculosa Lamarck, 1822: synonym of Paratectonatica tigrina (Röding, 1798)
- Natica magnifluctuata Kuroda, 1961: synonym of Tanea magnifluctuata (Kuroda, 1961)
- Natica maheense Reeve, 1855: synonym of Natica seychellium Watson, 1886
- Natica mamilla (Linnaeus, 1758): synonym of Polinices mammilla (Linnaeus, 1758)
- Natica manceli Jousseaume, 1874: synonym of Naticarius manceli (Jousseaume, 1874)
- Natica marmorata Risso, 1826: synonym of Euspira guilleminii (Payraudeau, 1826)
- Natica marmorata H. Adams, 1869: synonym of Natica prietoi Hidalgo, 1873
- Natica maura Lamarck, 1816: synonym of Mammilla maura (Lamarck, 1816)
- Natica melanochila Philippi, 1852: synonym of Mammilla melanostoma (Gmelin, 1791)
- Natica melanoperculata Liu, 1977: synonym of Naticarius melanoperculatus (X. Liu, 1977)
- Natica melanostomoides Quoy & Gaimard, 1832: synonym of Mammilla melanostomoides (Quoy & Gaimard, 1832)
- Natica melanostoma (Gmelin, 1791): synonym of Mammilla melanostoma (Gmelin, 1791)
- Natica micra Haas, 1953: synonym of Tectonatica micra (Haas, 1953)
- Natica microstoma Quoy & Gaimard, 1833: synonym of Conuber sordidum (Swainson, 1821)
- Natica millepunctata Lamarck: synonym of Natica stercusmuscarum (Gmelin, 1791)
- Natica mittrei Hombron & Jacquinot, 1853: synonym of Polinices citrinus (Philippi, 1851)
- Natica monilifera Lamarck, 1822: synonym of Euspira catena (da Costa, 1778)
- Natica montacuti Jeffreys, 1867: synonym of Euspira montagui (Forbes, 1838)
- Natica montagui Forbes, 1838: synonym of Euspira montagui (Forbes, 1838)
- Natica mozaica Sowerby, 1883: synonym of Tanea mozaica (Sowerby, 1883)
- Natica nana Møller, 1842: synonym of Pseudopolinices nanus (Møller, 1842)
- Natica napus E.A. Smith, 1904: synonym of Euspira napus (E.A. Smith, 1904)
- Natica nebulosa Schepman, 1909: synonym of Notocochlis cernica (Jousseaume, 1874)
- Natica nemo Bartsch, 1915: synonym of Notocochlis gualteriana (Récluz, 1844)
- Natica neustriaca Locard, 1886: synonym of Euspira nitida (Donovan, 1804)
- Natica nigromaculata Lamy, 1911: synonym of Falsilunatia nigromaculata (Lamy, 1911)
- Natica nitida (Donovan, 1804): synonym of Euspira nitida (Donovan, 1804)
- Natica notabilis Jeffreys, 1885: synonym of Euspira notabilis (Jeffreys, 1885)
- Natica nubila Dall, 1889: synonym of Payraudeautia nubila (Dall, 1889)
- Natica nucula Reeve, 1855: synonym of Tectonatica suffusa (Reeve, 1855)
- Natica nukahivensis Jardin, 1859: synonym of Naticarius zonalis (Récluz, 1850)
- Natica obtusa Jeffreys, 1885: synonym of Euspira obtusa (Jeffreys, 1885)
- Natica ochrostigmata Rehder, 1980: synonym of Notocochlis cernica (Jousseaume, 1874)
- Natica olivella Locard, 1897: synonym of Amauropsis brassiculina (Locard, 1897)
- Natica olla de Serres, 1829: synonym of Neverita josephinia Risso, 1826
- Natica ochrostoma Récluz, 1850: synonym of Polinices lacteus (Guilding, 1834)
- Natica omoia Mabille & Rochebrune, 1885 †: synonym of Glossaulax secunda (Rochebrune & Mabille, 1885) †
- Natica onca (Röding, 1798): synonym of Naticarius onca (Röding, 1798)
- Natica opaca Récluz, 1851: synonym of Mammilla melanostoma (Gmelin, 1791)
- Natica operculata Jeffreys, 1885: synonym of Cryptonatica operculata (Jeffreys, 1885)
- Natica orientalis (Gmelin, 1791): synonym of Naticarius orientalis (Gmelin, 1791)
- Natica otis Broderip & G. B. Sowerby I, 1829: synonym of Polinices otis (Broderip & G. B. Sowerby I, 1829)
- Natica ovata G. B. Sowerby III, 1914: synonym of Lunatia pila ovata (G. B. Sowerby III, 1914)
- Natica ovum Menke, 1850: synonym of Polinices uber (Valenciennes, 1832)
- Natica pallida Broderip & Sowerby, 1829: synonym of Euspira pallida (Broderip & Sowerby, 1829)
- Natica pallium Récluz, 1850: synonym of Vanikoro cumingiana (Récluz, 1844)
- Natica panamaensis Récluz, 1844: synonym of Polinices panamaensis (Récluz, 1844)
- Natica papilla (Gmelin, 1791): synonym of Eunaticina papilla (Gmelin, 1791)
- Natica papyracea von den Busch, 1845: synonym of Neverita didyma (Röding, 1798)
- Natica parvula Tapparone Canefri, 1869: synonym of Euspira nitida (Donovan, 1804)
- Natica patagonica Philippi, 1845: synonym of Falsilunatia patagonica (Philippi, 1845)
- Natica patula G.B. Sowerby I, 1824: synonym of Hypterita helicoides (Gray, 1825)
- Natica payeni Rochebrune & Mabille, 1885: synonym of Tectonatica impervia (Philippi, 1845)
- Natica peselephanti Link, 1807: synonym of Polinices peselephanti (Link, 1807)
- Natica petiveriana Récluz in Chenu, 1843: synonym of Neverita didyma (Röding, 1798)
- Natica pfeifferi Philippi, 1851: synonym of Polinices lacteus (Guilding, 1834)
- Natica phaeocephala Dautzenberg & Fischer H., 1896: synonym of Euspira phaeocephala (Dautzenberg & H. Fischer, 1896)
- Natica philippiana Récluz in Chenu, 1843: synonym of Neverita josephinia Risso, 1826
- Natica philippiana Reeve, 1855: synonym of Neverita josephinia Risso, 1826
- Natica phytelephas Reeve, 1855: synonym of Polinices candidissimus (Le Guillou, 1842)
- Natica picta Recluz, 1843: synonym of Tanea picta (Récluz, 1844)
- Natica plicatula Reeve, 1855: synonym of Euspira fusca (Blainville, 1825)
- Natica plumbea Lamarck, 1822: synonym of Conuber sordidum (Swainson, 1821)
- Natica poliana Delle Chiaje, 1826: synonym of Euspira nitida (Donovan, 1804)
- Natica pomum Philippi, 1851: synonym of Euspira heros (Say, 1822)
- Natica ponderosa Philippi, 1852: synonym of Polinices mammilla (Linnaeus, 1758)
- Natica ponsonbyi Melvill, 1899: synonym of Natica vitellus (Linnaeus, 1758)
- Natica porcelana d'Orbigny, 1840: synonym of Polinices lacteus (Guilding, 1834)
- Natica powisiana Récluz, 1844: synonym of Polinices peselephanti (Link, 1807)
- Natica prasina Watson, 1881: synonym of Amauropsis prasina (Watson, 1881)
- Natica priamus Récluz, 1844: synonym of Mammilla priamus (Récluz, 1844)
- Natica prietoi (Hidalgo, 1873): synonym of Tectonatica prietoi (Hidalgo, 1873)
- Natica pritchardi Forbes, 1850: synonym of Natica chemnitzii L. Pfeiffer, 1840
- Natica problematica Reeve, 1855: synonym of Glossaulax vesicalis (Philippi, 1849)
- Natica prosistens Locard, 1897: synonym of Euspira subplicata (Jeffreys, 1885)
- Natica psila Watson, 1886: synonym of Polinices psilus (Watson, 1886)
- Natica puella Philippi, 1852: synonym of Polinices lacteus (Guilding, 1834)
- Natica pulchella Risso, 1826: synonym of Euspira pulchella (Risso, 1826)
- Natica pulicaris Philippi, 1842: synonym of Natica cincta Récluz, 1850
- Natica purpurea Dall, 1871: synonym of Amauropsis islandica (Gmelin, 1791)
- Natica pusilla Say, 1822: synonym of Tectonatica pusilla (Say, 1822)
- Natica pusilla Gould, 1841: synonym of Euspira pallida (Broderip & Sowerby, 1829)
- Natica pyramis Reeve, 1855: synonym of Conuber conicum (Lamarck, 1822)
- Natica pyriformis Récluz, 1844: synonym of Polinices mammilla (Linnaeus, 1758)
- Natica pyrrhosticta Dautzenberg & H. Fischer, 1896: synonym of Tectonatica rizzae (Philippi, 1844)
- Natica ranzii Kuroda, 1961: synonym of Cryptonatica hirasei (Pilsbry, 1905)
- Natica rapulum Reeve, 1855: synonym of Polinices intemeratus (Philippi, 1853)
- Natica ravida Souleyet, 1852: synonym of Polinices amiculatus (Philippi, 1849)
- Natica raynaudiana: synonym of Natica raynoldiana Récluz, 1844
- Natica raynoldiana Récluz, 1844: synonym of Natica arachnoidea (Gmelin, 1791)
- Natica reclusiana Deshayes, 1839: synonym of Neverita reclusiana (Deshayes, 1839)
- Natica recognita Mabille & Rochebrune, 1889: synonym of Falsilunatia patagonica (Philippi, 1845)
- Natica reneae Saunders, 1978: synonym of Natica canariensis Odhner, 1932
- Natica rhodostoma Philippi, 1842: synonym of Tectonatica violacea (G. B. Sowerby I, 1825)
- Natica rizzae Philippi, 1844: synonym of Tectonatica rizzae (Philippi, 1844)
- Natica robillardi Sowerby, 1893: synonym of Tectonatica robillardi (Sowerby III, 1894)
- Natica roscoei Kilburn, 1976: synonym of Natica buriasiensis Récluz, 1844
- Natica rufa Born, 1778: synonym of Natica vitellus (Linnaeus, 1758)
- Natica rufilabris Reeve, 1855: synonym of Natica livida Pfeiffer, 1840
- Natica russa Gould, 1859: synonym of Cryptonatica affinis (Gmelin, 1791)
- Natica russa Dall, 1874: synonym of Cryptonatica affinis (Gmelin, 1791)
- Natica rutila MacGillivray, 1843: synonym of Euspira montagui (Forbes, 1838)
- Natica sagittata Menke, 1843: synonym of Tanea sagittata (Menke, 1843)
- Natica sagittifera Récluz, 1852: synonym of Natica alapapilionis (Röding, 1798)
- Natica sagraiana d'Orbigny, 1842: synonym of Tectonatica sagraiana (d'Orbigny, 1842)
- Natica salangonensis Récluz, 1844: synonym of Polinices otis (Broderip & Sowerby, 1829)
- Natica saldontiana Bartsch, 1915: synonym of Natica simplex Sowerby III, 1897
- Natica samarensis Récluz, 1844: synonym of Mammilla simiae (Deshayes, 1838)
- Natica sanctivincentii Brooks, 1933: synonym of Polinices lacteus (Guilding, 1834)
- Natica sanguinolenta Deshayes, 1839: synonym of Conuber melastoma (Swainson, 1821)
- Natica sanguinolenta Brusina, 1865: synonym of Naticarius stercusmuscarum (Gmelin, 1791)
- Natica schoutanica May, 1913: synonym of Tasmatica schoutanica (May, 1913)
- Natica sculpta Martens, 1878: synonym of Sinuber sculptum (Martens, 1878)
- Natica sebae Récluz, 1844: synonym of Mammilla sebae (Récluz, 1844)
- Natica secunda Rochebrune and Mabille, 1885: synonym of Glossaulax secunda (Rochebrune and Mabille, 1885)
- Natica senegalensis Récluz, 1850: synonym of Natica fulminea (Gmelin, 1791)
- Natica septentrionalis Møller, 1842: synonym of Cryptonatica affinis (Gmelin, 1791)
- Natica settepassii Gaglini in Settepassi, 1985: synonym of Tectonatica rizzae (Philippi, 1844)
- Natica shorehami Pritchard & Gatliff, 1900: synonym of Tectonatica shorehami (Pritchard & Gatliff, 1900)
- Natica sigaretina Menke, 1828: synonym of Mammilla simiae (Deshayes, 1838)
- Natica simiae Deshayes, 1838: synonym of Mammilla simiae (Deshayes, 1838)
- Natica simplex Schepman, 1909: synonym of Natica schepmani Thiele, 1925
- Natica simulans E. A. Smith, 1906: synonym of Uberella simulans (E. A. Smith, 1906)
- Natica solida Blainville, 1825: synonym of Natica fasciata (Röding, 1798)
- Natica soluta Gould, 1848: synonym of Falsilunatia patagonica (Philippi, 1845)
- Natica sordida Swainson, 1821: synonym of Conuber sordidum (Swainson, 1821)
- Natica sordida Philippi, 1844: synonym of Euspira fusca (Blainville, 1825)
- Natica souleyetiana Récluz, 1850: synonym of Tanea zelandica (Quoy & Gaimard, 1832)
- Natica sphaeroides Jeffreys, 1877: synonym of Amauropsis sphaeroides (Jeffreys, 1877)
- Natica squalida MacGillivray, 1843: synonym of Euspira montagui (Forbes, 1838)
- Natica stercusmuscarum (Gmelin, 1791): synonym of Naticarius stercusmuscarum (Gmelin, 1791)
- Natica stimpsoni Bartsch, 1915: synonym of Tectonatica tecta (Anton, 1838)
- Natica straminea Récluz, 1844: synonym of Polinices aurantius (Röding, 1798)
- Natica strangei Reeve, 1855: synonym of Conuber sordidum (Swainson, 1821)
- Natica strongyla Melvill, 1897: synonym of Naticarius manceli (Jousseaume, 1874)
- Natica subpallescens Strebel, 1908: synonym of Amauropsis subpallescens (Strebel, 1908)
- Natica subplicata Jeffreys, 1885: synonym of Euspira subplicata (Jeffreys, 1885)
- Natica succineoides Reeve, 1855: synonym of Mammilla melanostoma (Gmelin, 1791)
- Natica suffusa Reeve, 1855: synonym of Tectonatica suffusa (Reeve, 1855)
- Natica sulphurea Récluz, 1844: synonym of Polinices aurantius (Röding, 1798)
- Natica supraornata Schepman, 1909: synonym of Natica buriasiensis Récluz, 1844
- Natica taeniata Menke, 1830: synonym of Naticarius alapapilionis (Röding, 1798)
- Natica taslei Récluz, 1853: synonym of Natica broderipiana Récluz, 1844
- Natica tasmanica Tenison-Woods, 1876: synonym of Conuber conicum (Lamarck, 1822)
- Natica tecta Anton H.E., 1838: synonym of Tectonatica tecta (Anton, 1838)
- Natica telaaraneae Melvill, 1901: synonym of Natica buriasiensis Récluz, 1844
- Natica tenuicula G. B. Sowerby III, 1915: synonym of Bulbus tenuiculus (G. B. Sowerby III, 1915)
- Natica tenuipicta Kuroda, 1961: synonym of Tanea tenuipicta (Kuroda, 1961)
- Natica tenuis Philippi, 1852: synonym of Laguncula pulchella Benson, 1842
- Natica tenuis Récluz, 1851: synonym of Euspira tenuis (Récluz, 1851)
- Natica tenuistriata Dautzenberg & H. Fischer, 1911: synonym of Euspira tenuistriata (Dautzenberg & H. Fischer, 1911)
- Natica tessellata Philippi, 1849: synonym of Notocochlis gualteriana (Récluz, 1844)
- Natica texasiana Philippi, 1849: synonym of Neverita delessertiana (Récluz, 1843)
- Natica textilis Reeve, 1855: synonym of Natica vittata (Gmelin, 1791)
- Natica tigrina (Röding, 1798): synonym of Notocochlis tigrina (Röding, 1798)
- Natica tincturata Reeve, 1855: synonym of Natica cincta Récluz, 1850
- Natica tosaensis Kuroda, 1961: synonym of Tanea tosaensis (Kuroda, 1961)
- Natica trailli Reeve, 1835: synonym of Natica buriasiensis Récluz, 1844
- Natica tranquilla Melvill & Standen, 1901: synonym of Notocochlis tranquilla (Melvill & Standen, 1901)
- Natica triseriata Say, 1826: synonym of Euspira triseriata (Say, 1826)
- Natica uber Valenciennes, 1832: synonym of Polinices uber (Valenciennes, 1832)
- Natica uberina d'Orbigny, 1842: synonym of Polinices uberinus (d'Orbigny, 1842)
- Natica umbilicata Quoy & Gaimard, 1832: synonym of Eunaticina umbilicata (Quoy & Gaimard, 1832)
- Natica undata Philippi, 1852: synonym of Natica chemnitzii L. Pfeiffer, 1840
- Natica undulata: synonym of Tanea undulata (Röding, 1798)
- Natica unimaculata Reeve, 1855: synonym of Polinices otis (Broderip & G. B. Sowerby I, 1829)
- Natica ustulata G. B. Sowerby II, 1883: synonym of Conuber conicum (Lamarck, 1822)
- Natica valenciennesii Payraudeau, 1826: synonym of Euspira intricata (Donovan, 1804)
- Natica variabilis Reeve, 1855: synonym of Natica adansoni Blainville, 1825
- Natica variolaria Récluz, 1844: synonym of Natica multipunctata Blainville, 1825
- Natica vavaosi Reeve, 1855: synonym of Polinices vavaosi (Reeve, 1855)
- Natica venustula Philippi, 1851: synonym of Tectonatica venustula (Philippi, 1851)
- Natica vesicalis Philippi, 1849: synonym of Glossaulax vesicalis (Philippi, 1849)
- Natica vestalis Philippi, 1851: synonym of Polinices flemingianus (Récluz, 1844)
- Natica violacea G.B. Sowerby I, 1825: synonym of Tectonatica violacea (G.B. Sowerby I, 1825)
- Natica virginea Récluz, 1850: synonym of Polinices uber (Valenciennes, 1832)
- Natica virginea Philippi, 1852: synonym of Polinices flemingianus (Recluz, 1844)
- Natica vitrea Hutton, 1873: synonym of Uberella vitrea (Hutton, 1873)
- Natica vittata (Gmelin, 1791): synonym of Cochlis vittata (Gmelin, 1791)
- Natica whitechurchi Turton, 1932: synonym of Natica simplex Sowerby III, 1897
- Natica xantha Watson, 1881: synonym of Falsilunatia xantha (Watson, 1881)
- Natica zanzebarica Récluz, 1844: synonym of Mammilla sebae (Récluz, 1844)
- Natica zebra Lamarck, 1822 accepted as Tanea undulata (Röding, 1798)
- Natica zelandica Quoy & Gaimard, 1832: synonym of Tanea zelandica (Quoy & Gaimard, 1832)
- Natica zonalis Récluz, 1850: synonym of Naticarius zonalis (Récluz, 1850)
- Natica zonulata Thiele, 1925: synonym of Tectonatica zonulata (Thiele, 1925)

50 second video of snails (most likely Natica chemnitzi and Cerithium stercusmuscaram) feeding on the sea floor in the Gulf of California, Puerto Peñasco, Mexico
