= Natica castrensis =

Scientific classification
- Kingdom: Animalia
- Phylum: Mollusca
- Class: Gastropoda
- Subclass: Caenogastropoda
- Order: Littorinimorpha
- Family: Naticidae
- Genus: Natica
- Species: N. castrensis

Binomial name
- Natica castrensis (Dall, 1889)

Species of gastropod

Natica castrensis is a species of predatory sea snail, a marine gastropod mollusk in the family Naticidae, the moon snails.

== Distribution ==
Barbados, Lesser Antilles. Known from hermit-crabbed shells, in deep-water traps set at 150-200 metres.
