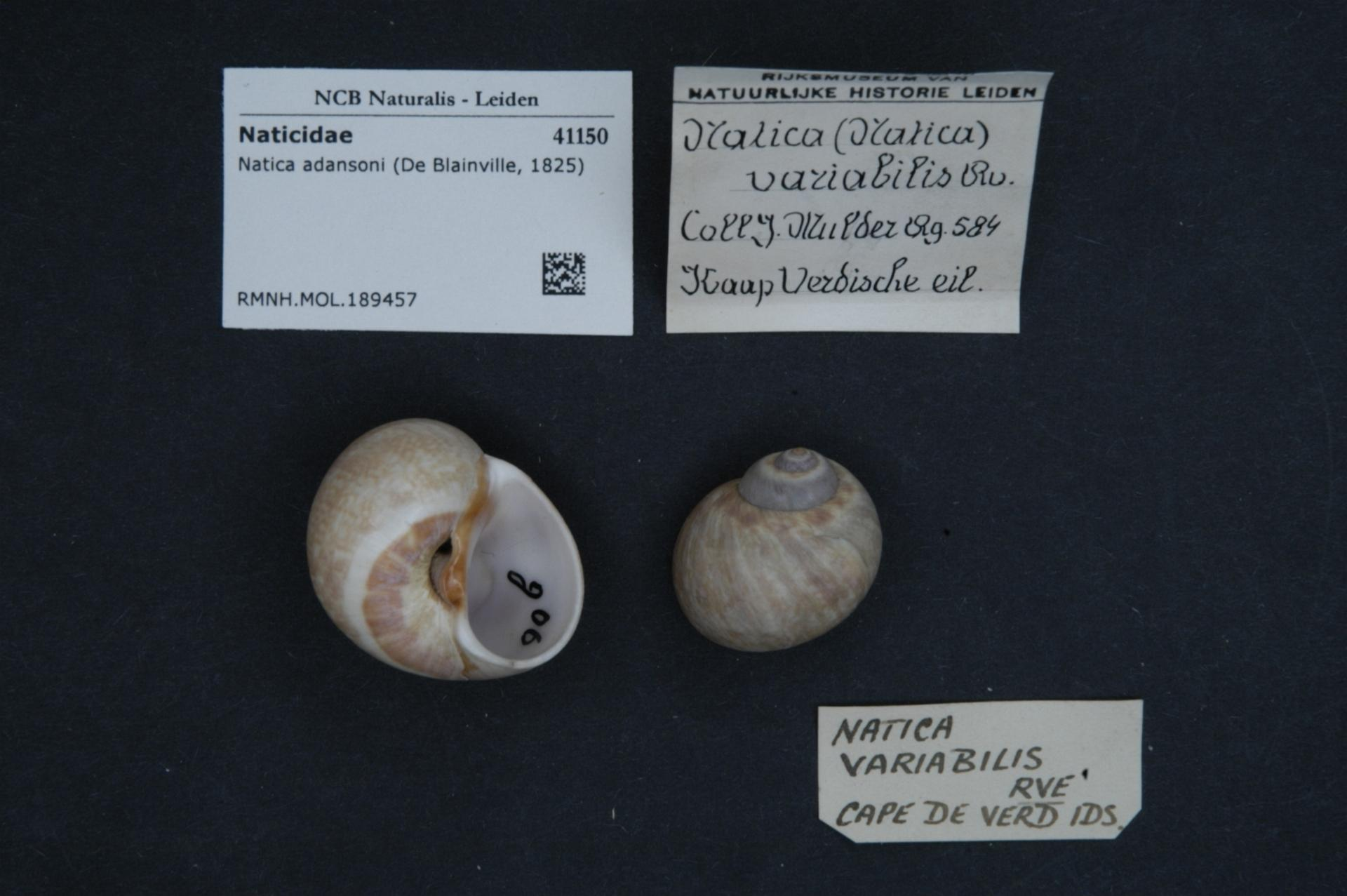

Scientific classification
- Kingdom: Animalia
- Phylum: Mollusca
- Class: Gastropoda
- Subclass: Caenogastropoda
- Order: Littorinimorpha
- Family: Naticidae
- Genus: Natica
- Species: N. adansoni

Binomial name
- Natica adansoni Blainville, 1825

= Natica adansoni =

Species of gastropod

Natica adansoni is a species of predatory sea snail, a marine gastropod mollusk in the family Naticidae, the moon snails.
