= Natica livida =

Scientific classification
- Kingdom: Animalia
- Phylum: Mollusca
- Class: Gastropoda
- Subclass: Caenogastropoda
- Order: Littorinimorpha
- Family: Naticidae
- Genus: Natica
- Species: N. livida

Binomial name
- Natica livida Pfeiffer, 1840

Synonyms
- Natica jamaicensis C.B. Adams, 1850; Natica lacernula d'Orbigny, 1842; Natica rufilabris Reeve, 1855

Species of gastropod

Natica livida is a species of predatory sea snail, a marine gastropod mollusk in the family Naticidae, the moon snails.

== Distribution ==
This species occurs in the Caribbean Sea, the Gulf of Mexico and the Lesser Antilles.

== Description ==
The maximum recorded shell length is 21 mm.

== Habitat ==
Minimum recorded depth is 0 m. Maximum recorded depth is 65 m.
