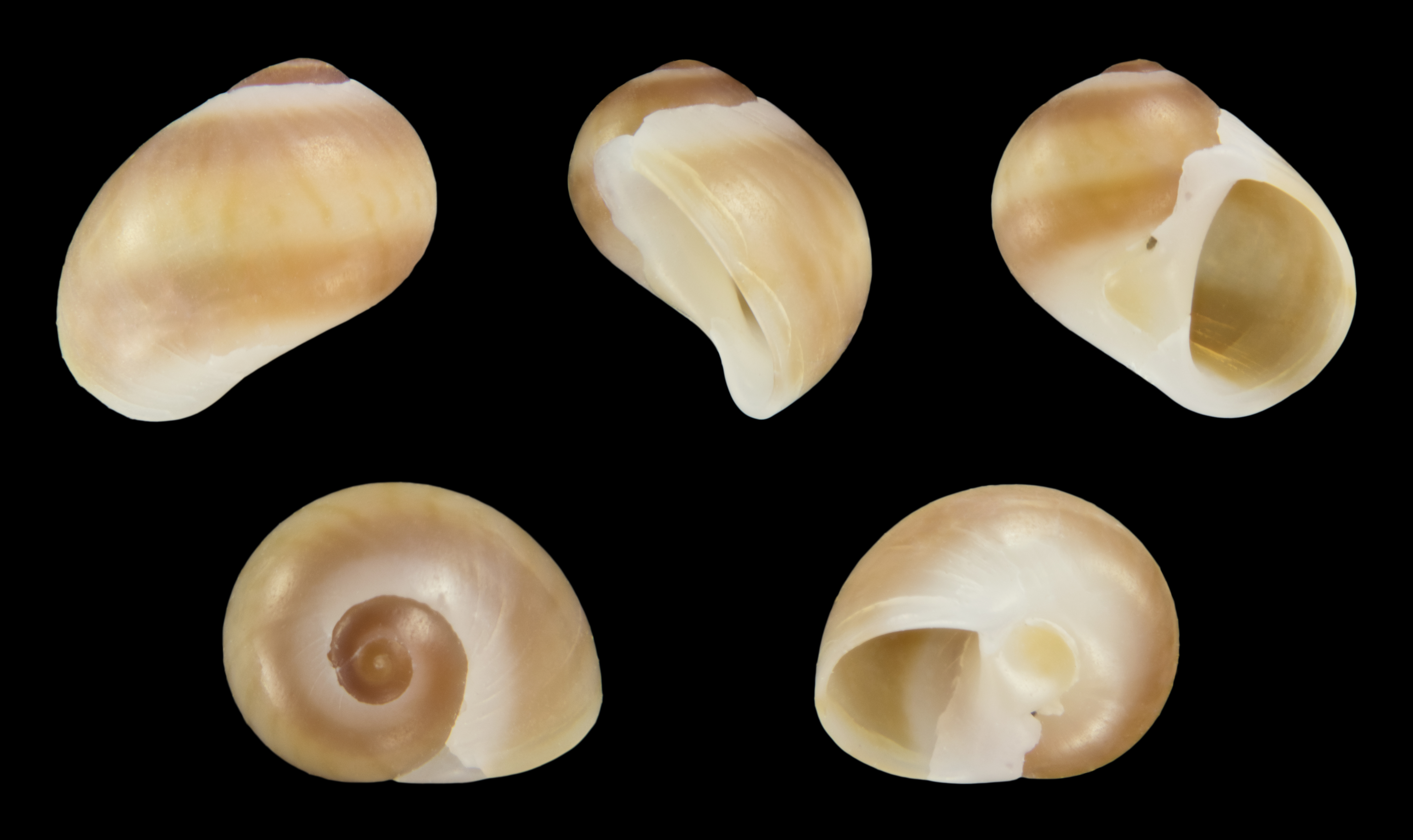

Scientific classification
- Kingdom: Animalia
- Phylum: Mollusca
- Class: Gastropoda
- Subclass: Caenogastropoda
- Order: Littorinimorpha
- Family: Naticidae
- Genus: Natica
- Species: N. furva

Binomial name
- Natica furva Watson, 1897

= Natica furva =

Species of gastropod

Natica furva is a species of predatory sea snail, a marine gastropod mollusk in the family Naticidae, the moon snails.
