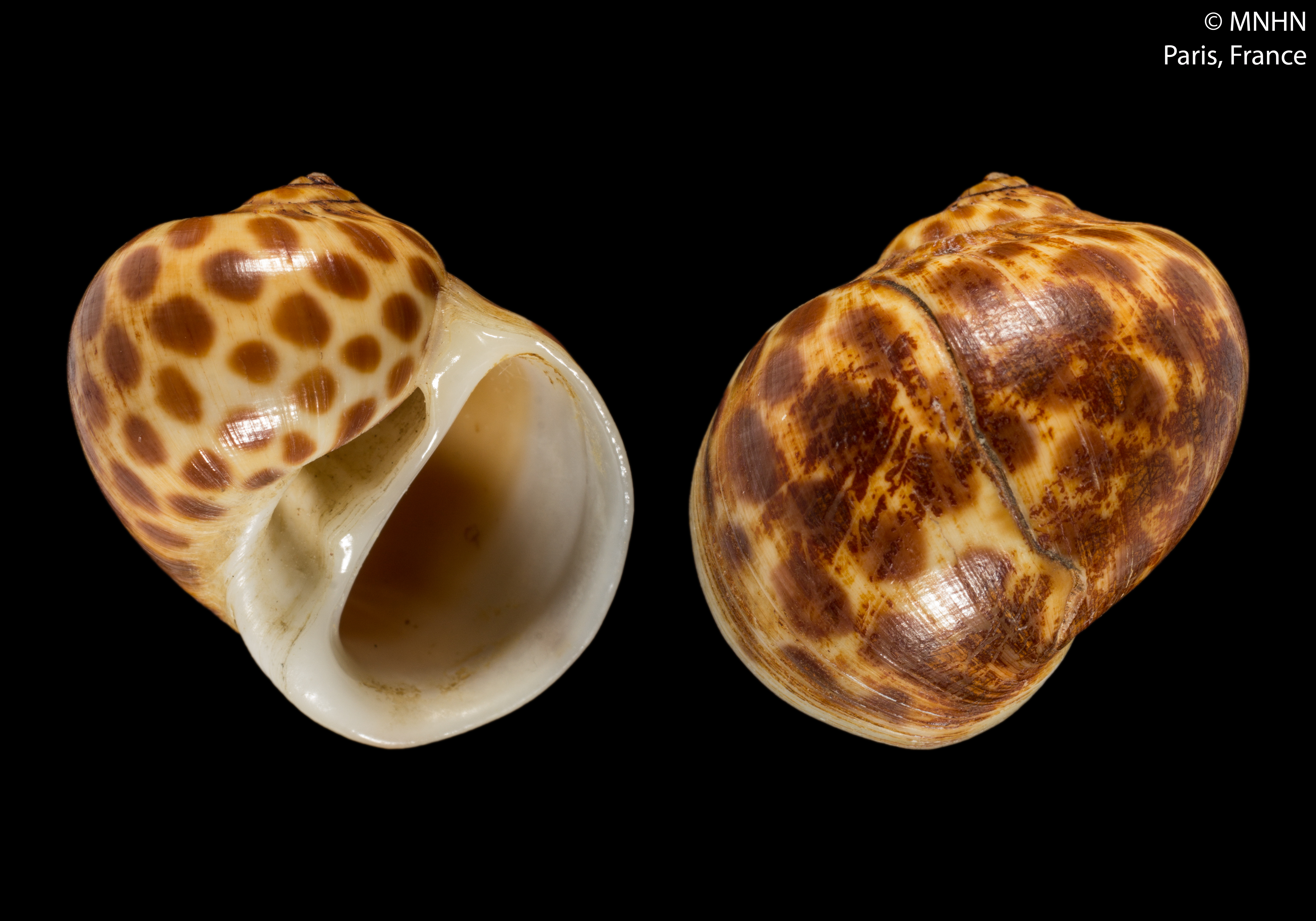
- Shell of Natica acinonyx (holotype at MNHN, Paris)

Scientific classification
- Kingdom: Animalia
- Phylum: Mollusca
- Class: Gastropoda
- Subclass: Caenogastropoda
- Order: Littorinimorpha
- Family: Naticidae
- Genus: Natica
- Species: N. acinonyx

Binomial name
- Natica acinonyx Marche-Marchad, 1957

Synonyms
- Natica acynonyx [sic] (misspelling)

= Natica acinonyx =

Species of gastropod

Natica acinonyx is a species of predatory sea snail, a marine gastropod mollusk in the family Naticidae, the moon snails. This species is more commonly known as the African Berry Moon Snail.

== Description ==
The length of the spiral shell attains 15.6 mm.

== Distribution ==
This species occurs in the Atlantic Ocean off Angola and Senegal.
