= Natica turtoni =

- Natica turtoni shell at the Naturalis Biodiversity Center.

Scientific classification
- Kingdom: Animalia
- Phylum: Mollusca
- Class: Gastropoda
- Subclass: Caenogastropoda
- Order: Littorinimorpha
- Family: Naticidae
- Genus: Natica
- Species: N. turtoni

Binomial name
- Natica turtoni E.A.Smith, 1890

Species of gastropod

Natica turtoni is a species of predatory sea snail, a marine gastropod mollusk in the family Naticidae, the moon snails.
