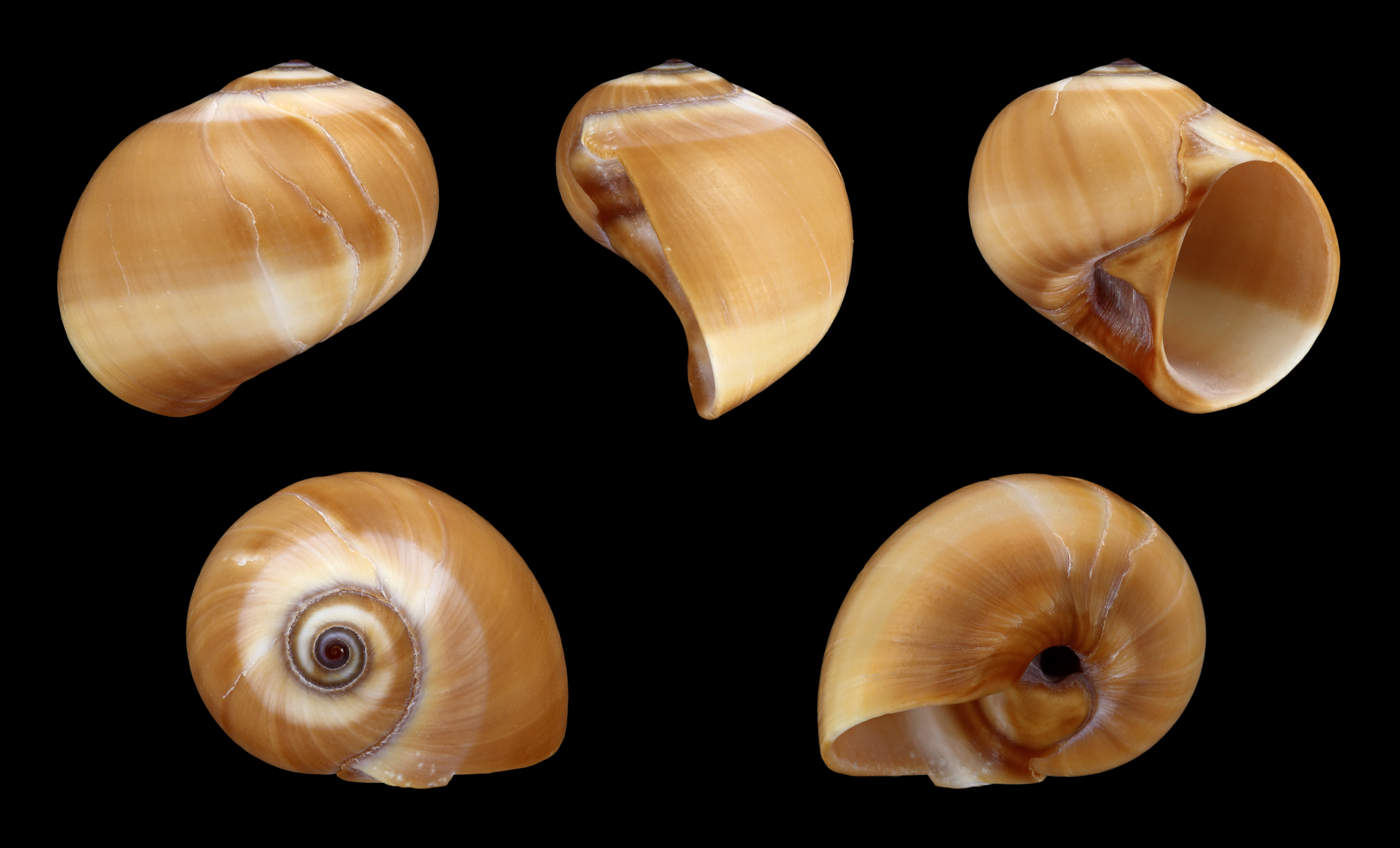
- Several views of a shell of Natica fasciata

Scientific classification
- Kingdom: Animalia
- Phylum: Mollusca
- Class: Gastropoda
- Subclass: Caenogastropoda
- Order: Littorinimorpha
- Family: Naticidae
- Genus: Natica
- Species: N. fasciata

Binomial name
- Natica fasciata (Röding, 1798)

Synonyms
- Albula fasciata Röding, 1798 (original combination); Natica cinnamomea Menke, 1830; Natica lupinus Deshayes, 1838; Natica solida Blainville, 1825

= Natica fasciata =

Species of gastropod

Natica fasciata is a species of predatory sea snail, a marine gastropod mollusk in the family Naticidae, the moon snails.

== Description ==
The shell is moderately small, 15–25 mm in height, solid, rounded, and globose, with a short spire that is sculptured with irregular growth striae. It is light to dark brown in colour and is ornamented with a lighter band at the suture and another at the lower third of the body whorl; the whorls of the protoconch are purple.

The aperture is semi-ovate, and the parietal callus is dark chocolate-brown, shining, and covers most of the umbilicus, leaving only an anterior umbilical opening. The area adjacent to the umbilical groove is dark brown. The periostracum is light brown, thin, and opaque.

The operculum is calcareous and white, with a single marginal rib and serrations along the columellar edge. The radula has tricuspid rachidians with two accessory basal cusps, tricuspid laterals, bifid inner marginals, and simple outer marginals.

== Distribution ==
This species is distributed across the Indo-Pacific, from the western Indian Ocean - including the Mascarene Basin and Mozambique - through the Andaman Islands and Southeast Asia, and into the Western Pacific as far as Fiji (rare) and the Marshall Islands, as well as Australia (New South Wales, Northern Territory, Queensland, Western Australia). It does not extend further east in the Pacific Ocean.
