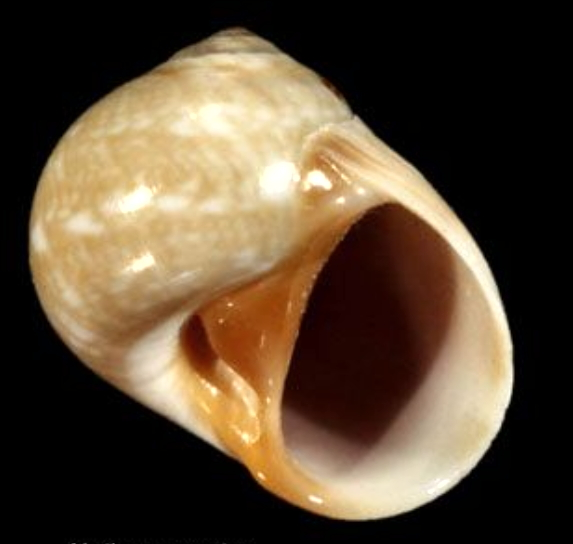
- Shell of Natica pseustes (specimen at the Natural History Museum, Rotterdam)

Scientific classification
- Kingdom: Animalia
- Phylum: Mollusca
- Class: Gastropoda
- Subclass: Caenogastropoda
- Order: Littorinimorpha
- Family: Naticidae
- Genus: Natica
- Species: N. pseustes

Binomial name
- Natica pseustes R. B. Watson, 1881

Synonyms
- Natica (Eunatica) telaaraneae Melvill, 1901 junior subjective synonym; Natica (Natica) roscoei Kilburn, 1976 junior subjective synonym; Natica lavendula Woolacott, 1956 junior subjective synonym; Natica roscoei Kilburn, 1976 junior subjective synonym; Natica telaaraneae Melvill, 1901 junior subjective synonym; Naticarius lavendula (Woolacott, 1956)

= Natica pseustes =

Species of gastropod

Natica pseustes is a species of predatory sea snail, a marine gastropod mollusk in the family Naticidae, the moon snails.

== Description ==
(Original description) The shell is rounded, with no angulation in its overall contour, and is obliquely, depressedly globose, with the spire scarcely projecting. It is thin, smooth, glossy, and porcellanous white, bearing a zone of large, irregular chestnut spots below the suture, while the umbilicus and columella are uniformly stained with the same colour.

The sculpture consists of numerous delicate, hair-like growth lines, which are strongest and most crowded near the suture and around the umbilicus. In addition, there is a very faint series of rounded spiral threads and furrows, one of which, just below the suture, is slightly stronger than the rest. The surface is also densely and microscopically scratched in a delicate, sharp pattern, these scratches being most evident on the upper part of the body whorl near the aperture, where their intersection with the growth lines produces a fine, crisp cross‑hatching. The centre of the base shows a scarcely perceptible carination, which becomes more pronounced just behind the point of the columella. Within this carination lies a strong but shallow umbilical furrow, which cuts deeply into the columella and curves around the base of the strong pad that chokes the umbilicus.

The colour is semitransparent, porcellanous white, becoming dead white around the umbilicus and in a broad band below the suture. This white band is flecked with irregular, sharply defined, ruddy chestnut spots, and a lighter stain of this colour suffuses the entire umbilicus and pillar. The rest of the shell is covered with a delicate network of fine, sharply defined light-chestnut lines, within which two or three spiral zones can be seen where the brown lines are sparser and pale lanceolate spots appear. No epidermis is visible.

The spire is scarcely raised, but is just perceptibly conical. The apex is rather large, with the extreme rounded tip forming the highest point of the shell. There are four and a half whorls in total, of which the first two and a half are embryonic and glassy; the whorls are very flatly rounded and increase rather slowly in size. The suture is almost horizontal and very inconspicuous.

The aperture is very oblique and semicircular, pointed above and rounded below, with a slight angulation at the front of the columella. The filling of the superior corner by a labial pad makes the two extremities more equal and reduces the opening to an unequal-sided oval; the aperture height is about three‑quarters of the total shell height, and the interior is open and transparent porcellanous white. The outer lip advances slightly as it leaves the body whorl, then just beyond the pad it retreats very slightly, and from that point its curve is even and regular; the edge is blunt and rounded.

The inner lip is very slightly concave. At the upper angle of the aperture it is formed by a thick, transparently porcellanous pad, faintly tinged with chestnut, which projects beyond the plane of the aperture as a point and is separated from the outer lip by a small triangular depression. This pad continues with an uneven surface across the body whorl and unites with the pad that closes the upper part of the umbilicus, where it is connected with the large chestnut-coloured spiral buttress that chokes the umbilicus. Below this, the narrow umbilical furrow cuts deeply into the thickness of the columella, whose edge is bevelled off both externally and internally. Towards its point, the columella is thickened by a feeble circumumbilical carina, which becomes suddenly more developed and distinct at that position. The umbilicus consists only of this channel or gutter, which twists around the columella callus and disappears behind it.

== Distribution ==
This species occurs in the Indian Ocean off Madagascar and Mozambique; and in the West Pacific (off Fiji); also off the Philippines, New Guinea and Australia
