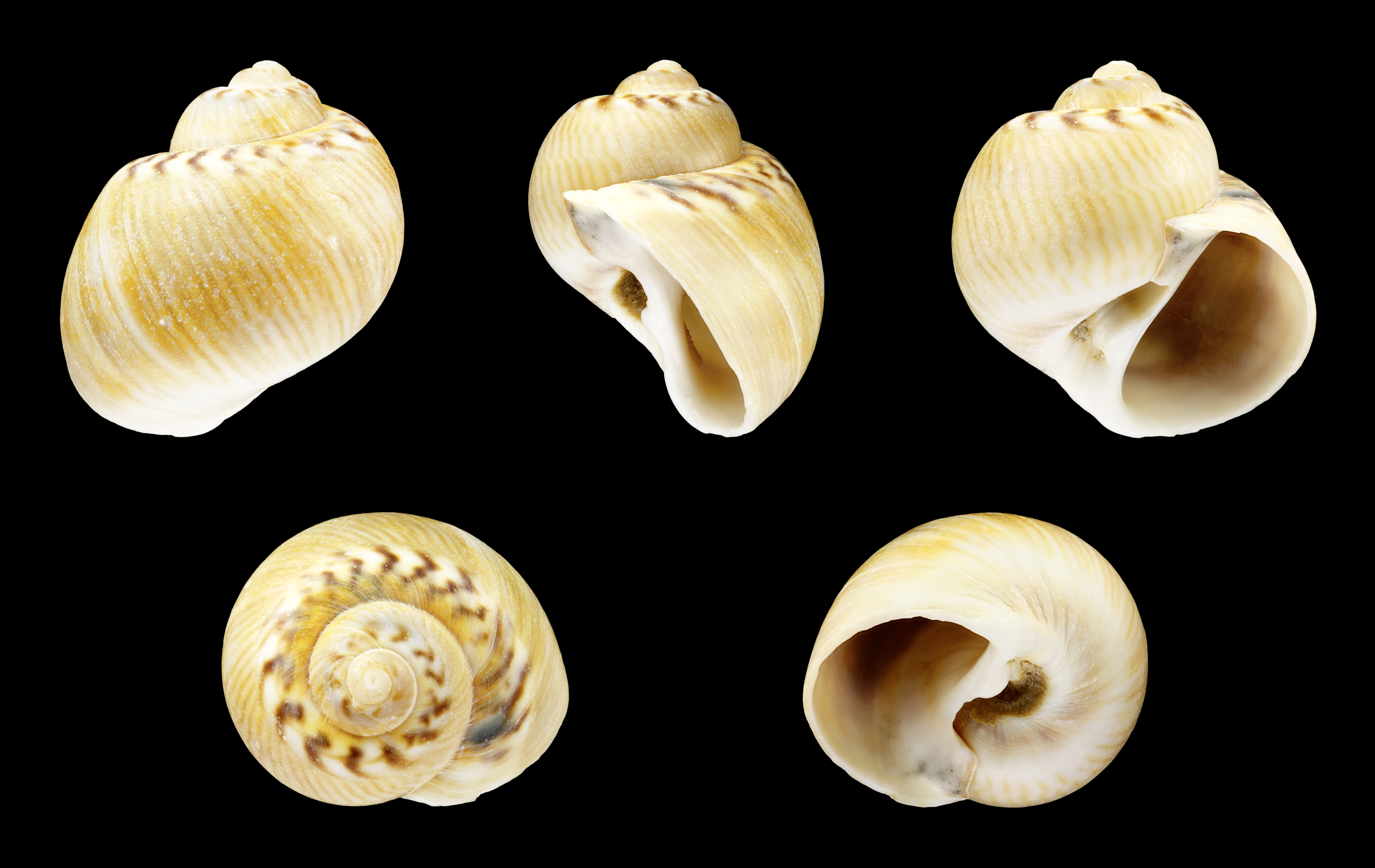

Scientific classification
- Kingdom: Animalia
- Phylum: Mollusca
- Class: Gastropoda
- Subclass: Caenogastropoda
- Order: Littorinimorpha
- Family: Naticidae
- Genus: Natica
- Species: N. collaris

Binomial name
- Natica collaris Link, 1807

Synonyms
- Natica collaria Lamarck, 1822; Natica gambiae Récluz, 1844; Natica labrella Lamarck, 1822

= Natica collaris =

Species of gastropod

Natica collaris, common name the collared moon snail, is a species of predatory sea snail, a marine gastropod mollusk in the family Naticidae, the moon snails.

== Description ==
The shell is globose to ovate and inflated, with a thick and generally smooth shell wall. The spire is low but acute, slightly projecting above the body whorl. Whorls are convex and may appear flattened above in some specimens. The inner lip may show a rose to violet tint, and the umbilicus is partly covered by a columellar callus.

Shell coloration is typically whitish to pale flesh-coloured, sometimes with darker or zoned markings. The aperture is oblique and relatively large, with a thickened and calloused columella. The umbilicus is narrow and deep and may contain a distinct funicle. The outer lip is thick, and the operculum is calcareous and solid.

Shell size commonly reaches approximately 25–30 mm in diameter, with a spire height of about 11 mm.

== Distribution ==
This snail occurs in the Atlantic Ocean off Senegal, Mauritania, Gabon and Angola.

== Taxonomy ==
The name Natica collaris was introduced by Link (1807) in a catalog-style treatment of the genus Natica, in which species were listed with brief vernacular identifiers and references to earlier literature rather than full descriptive accounts. Such catalog listings are considered sufficient to make names available under the rules of zoological nomenclature.

Natica collaria Lamarck, 1822 was later described as a distinct species, based on shell material in Lamarck's collection, but is currently regarded as a junior subjective synonym of N. collaris by WoRMS (MolluscaBase).

Other names, including Natica labrella Lamarck, 1822 and Natica gambiae Récluz, 1844, have historically been applied to shells now considered to belong to this species, but their synonymy is treated variably in the literature.
