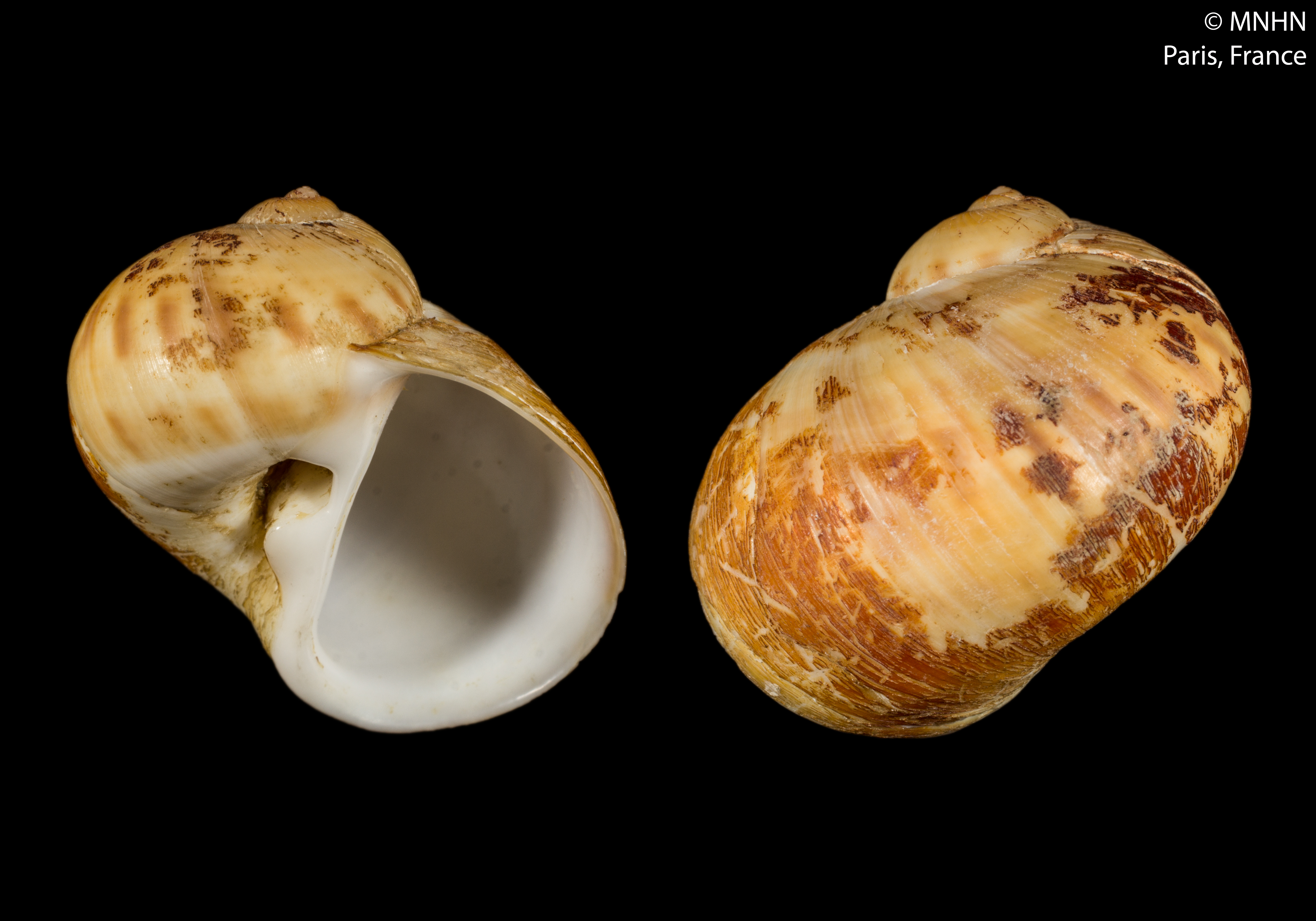
- Shell of Natica monodi (holotype at MNHN, Paris)

Scientific classification
- Kingdom: Animalia
- Phylum: Mollusca
- Class: Gastropoda
- Subclass: Caenogastropoda
- Order: Littorinimorpha
- Family: Naticidae
- Genus: Natica
- Species: N. monodi

Binomial name
- Natica monodi Marche-Marchad, 1957

= Natica monodi =

Species of gastropod

Natica monodi is a species of predatory sea snails, a marine gastropod mollusk in the family of Naticidae, also known as moon snails.

== Description ==
The length of the shell attains 25.3 mm.

== Distribution ==
This marine species occurs off the coast of Senegal.
