= Natica rocquignyi =

Scientific classification
- Kingdom: Animalia
- Phylum: Mollusca
- Class: Gastropoda
- Subclass: Caenogastropoda
- Order: Littorinimorpha
- Family: Naticidae
- Genus: Natica
- Species: N. rocquignyi

Binomial name
- Natica rocquignyi Fischer-Piette, 1942

Synonyms
- Natica fanel Récluz, 1844 (preoccupied name); Glyphepithema fanel rocquignyi Fischer-Piette, 1942

Species of gastropod

Natica rocquignyi is a species of predatory sea snail, a marine gastropod mollusk in the family Naticidae, the moon snails.

== Description ==
The length of the shell varies between 14 mm and 32 mm.

== Distribution ==
This species is distributed in the equatorial zone of the Atlantic Ocean along Angola and Gabon.
