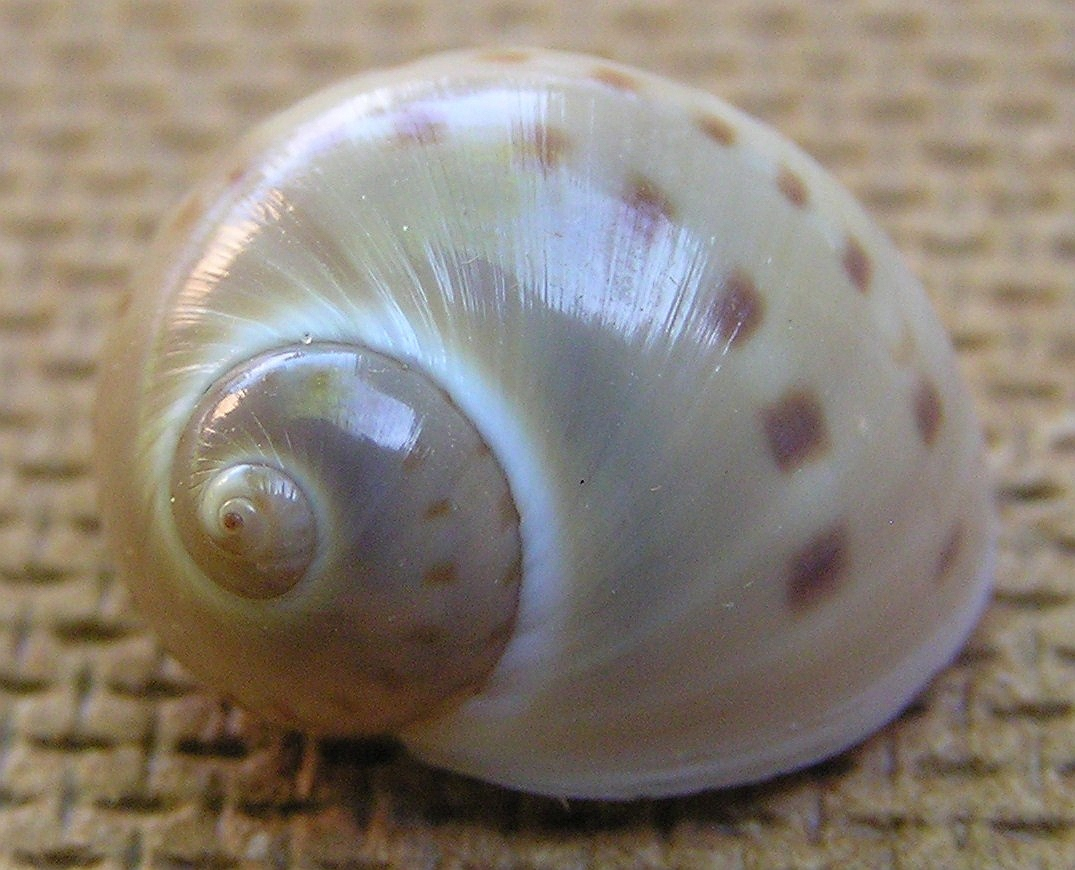
- Dorsal view of a shell of Natica limbata

Scientific classification
- Kingdom: Animalia
- Phylum: Mollusca
- Class: Gastropoda
- Subclass: Caenogastropoda
- Order: Littorinimorpha
- Family: Naticidae
- Genus: Natica
- Species: N. limbata

Binomial name
- Natica limbata d'Orbigny, 1837

Synonyms
- Natica atrocyanea Philippi, 1845

= Natica limbata =

Species of gastropod

Natica limbata is a species of predatory sea snail, a marine gastropod mollusk in the family Naticidae, the moon snails.

== Description ==
The maximum recorded shell length is 38 mm.

== Habitat ==
Minimum recorded depth is 0 m. Maximum recorded depth is 0 m.
