= Natica perlineata =

Scientific classification
- Kingdom: Animalia
- Phylum: Mollusca
- Class: Gastropoda
- Subclass: Caenogastropoda
- Order: Littorinimorpha
- Family: Naticidae
- Genus: Natica
- Species: N. perlineata

Binomial name
- Natica perlineata Dall, 1889

Species of gastropod

Natica perlineata is a species of predatory sea snail, a marine gastropod mollusk in the family Naticidae, the moon snails.

== Description ==
The maximum recorded shell length is 18.5 mm.

== Habitat ==
Minimum recorded depth is 69 m. Maximum recorded depth is 419 m.
