= Natica cabrerai =

Scientific classification
- Kingdom: Animalia
- Phylum: Mollusca
- Class: Gastropoda
- Subclass: Caenogastropoda
- Order: Littorinimorpha
- Family: Naticidae
- Genus: Natica
- Species: N. cabrerai

Binomial name
- Natica cabrerai Kase & Shigeta, 2000

Species of gastropod

Natica cabrerai is a species of predatory sea snail, a marine gastropod mollusk in the family Naticidae, the moon snails.
