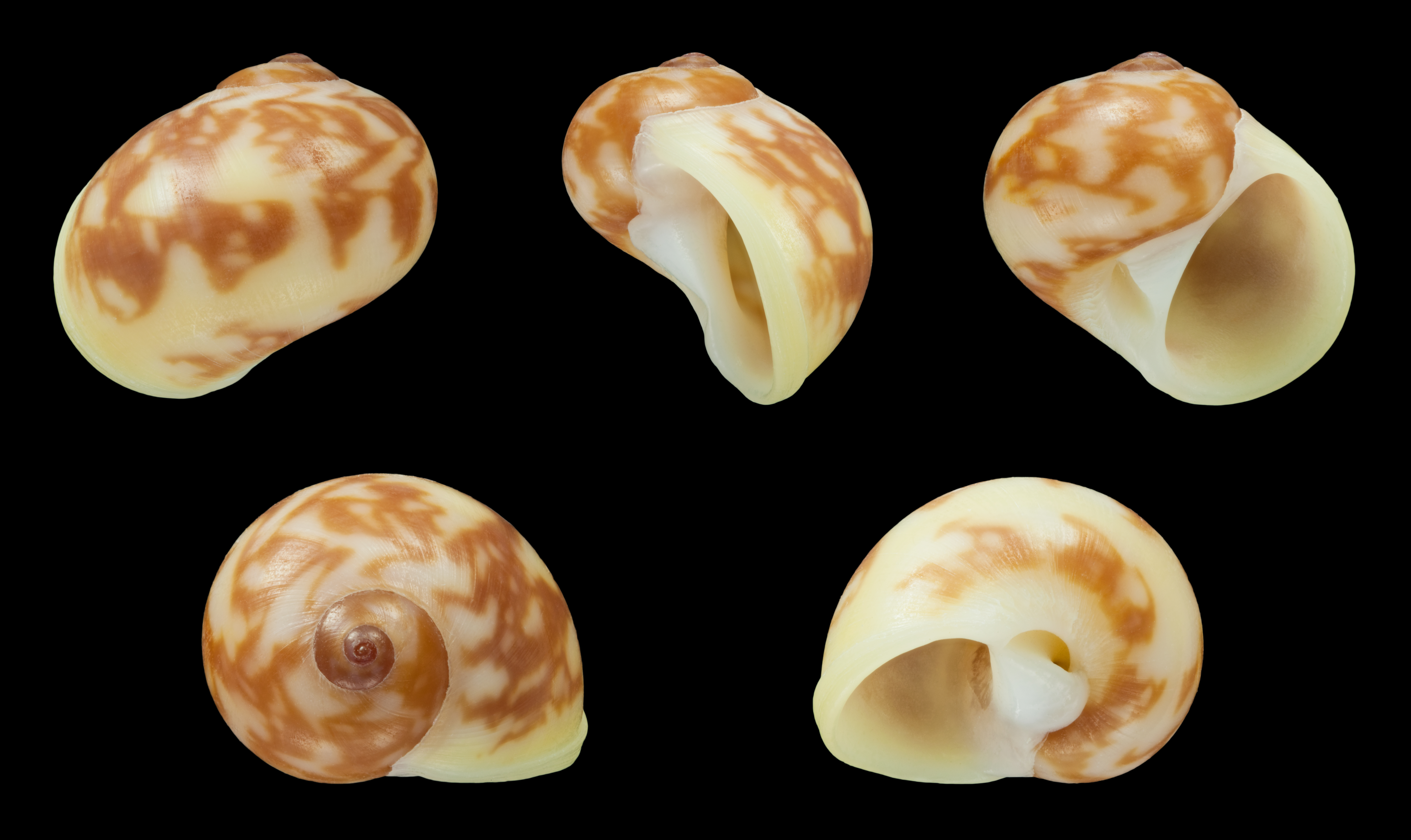
- Several views of a shell of Natica arachnoidea

Scientific classification
- Kingdom: Animalia
- Phylum: Mollusca
- Class: Gastropoda
- Subclass: Caenogastropoda
- Order: Littorinimorpha
- Family: Naticidae
- Genus: Natica
- Species: N. arachnoidea

Binomial name
- Natica arachnoidea (Gmelin, 1791)

Synonyms
- Natica (Natica) arachnoidea (Gmelin, 1791); Natica crassa Schepman, 1909 (Invalid: junior homonym of Natica crassa Nyst, 1845; Uber schepmani is a replacement name); Natica raynaudiana Récluz, 1844; Natica raynoldiana Récluz, 1844; Nerita arachnoidea Gmelin, 1791 (basionym); Uber schepmani Iredale, 1927

= Natica arachnoidea =

Species of gastropod

Natica arachnoidea, common name the spider moon snail, is a species of predatory sea snail, a marine gastropod mollusk in the family Naticidae, the moon snails.

== Description ==
The size of an adult shell varies between 13 mm and 26 mm. The shell is predominantly yellow-orange, patterned with irregular reddish-brown reticulate maculations across its whorls, and the protoconch is reddish-brown in color. As in other members of the genus Natica, the shell has a calcareous operculum and a circular to ovate umbilicus partially covered by fused parietal and umbilical calluses.

The shell is moderately small, measuring 10–25 mm in height, and is solid, with a low spire. It is smooth apart from fine axial growth striae. The coloration is white, yellow, or orange, and is ornamented with irregular brown streaks, zones, or lines; the protoconch is purplish brown, and the umbilical area is white.

The aperture is semiovate. The funicle (a spiral ridge or cord that runs into or around the umbilicus) is concealed beneath a parietal callus, which covers two-thirds to three-quarters of the umbilical area, and a posterior umbilical depression of variable width is present. The operculum is calcareous, white, and unisulcate, while the periostracum is thin, brown, and opaque.

The rachidian tooth of the radula is tricuspid, with two basal accessory cusps mounted on a narrow shield; the lateral teeth are tricuspid, the inner marginal teeth are bicuspid, and the outer marginal teeth are simple.

== Feeding and habitat ==
As a member of the family Naticidae, Natica arachnoidea is a predator targeting other mollusks, particularly bivalves. Naticid gastropods detect buried prey through the sediment and use their extensible foot to envelop the prey item, after which they may bore circular holes through the prey shell using the radula in combination with chemical secretions. Members of the family are most commonly associated with sandy substrates where burrowing prey are abundant.

== Distribution ==
This species is distributed across the Indo-Pacific, from the western Indian Ocean - including the Mascarene Basin and Mozambique - through the Andaman Islands and Southeast Asia, and into the Western Pacific as far as Fiji and the Marshall Islands, as well as Australia. It does not extend further east in the Pacific Ocean.
