= Natica multipunctata =

Scientific classification
- Kingdom: Animalia
- Phylum: Mollusca
- Class: Gastropoda
- Subclass: Caenogastropoda
- Order: Littorinimorpha
- Family: Naticidae
- Genus: Natica
- Species: N. multipunctata

Binomial name
- Natica multipunctata Blainville, 1825

Synonyms
- Natica fanel Récluz, 1844 (invalid: junior secondary homonym f Natica fanel (Röding, 1798)); Natica fanel rocquignyi Fischer-Piette, 1942; Natica variolaria Récluz, 1844

Species of gastropod

Natica multipunctata is a species of predatory sea snail, a marine gastropod mollusk in the family Naticidae, the moon snails.

== Distribution ==
This marine species occurs in the Atlantic Ocean off West Africa, the Cape Verdes and Angola.
