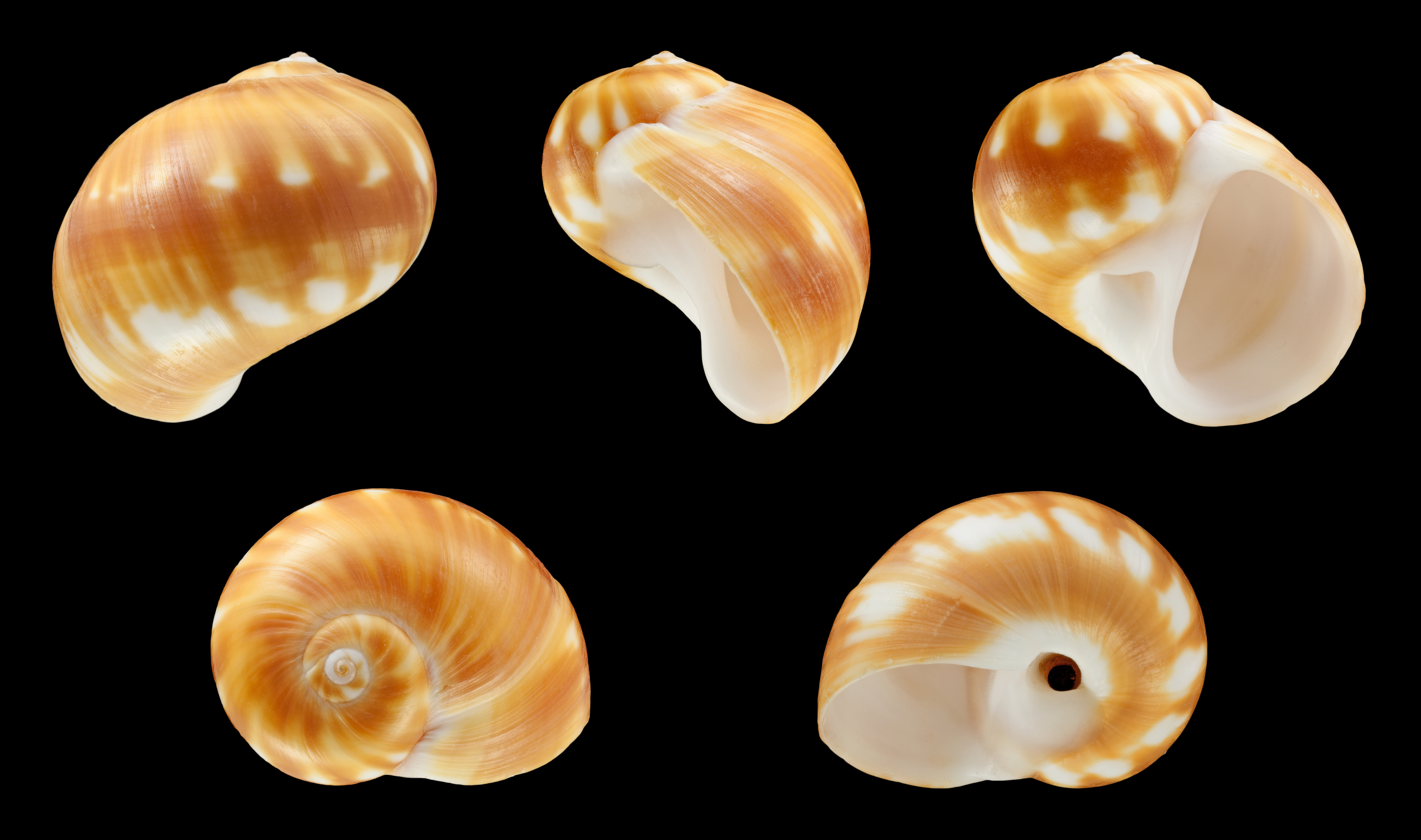
- Shell of Natica stellata

Scientific classification
- Kingdom: Animalia
- Phylum: Mollusca
- Class: Gastropoda
- Subclass: Caenogastropoda
- Order: Littorinimorpha
- Family: Naticidae
- Genus: Natica
- Species: N. stellata

Binomial name
- Natica stellata Hedley, 1913

Synonyms
- Natica stellatus Hedley, 1913 incorrect grammatical agreement of specific epithet

= Natica stellata =

Species of gastropod

Natica stellata is a species of predatory sea snail, a marine gastropod mollusk in the family Naticidae, the moon snails.

== Description ==
This species is similar in overall shape to Natica vitellus, but it differs markedly in coloration. The shell is a rich, saturated orange and is ornamented with spiral rows of white spots across the body whorl. A distinctive pink parietal callus forms a tongue-shaped extension that partially covers the posterior portion of the umbilicus.

The operculum is calcareous, white in colour, and bears two to three marginal ribs. An internal corneous operculum is attached to the foot along a central axis, while its margins remain free.

The radula is characterized by tricuspid rachidian teeth, with the two basal accessory cusps mounted on a broad basal shield. The lateral teeth are likewise tricuspid, whereas both the inner and outer marginal teeth are simple and unicuspid.

== Distribution ==
This species occurs in the Indo- West Pacific; also off Australia (Queensland)
