= Natica koperbergae =

Scientific classification
- Kingdom: Animalia
- Phylum: Mollusca
- Class: Gastropoda
- Subclass: Caenogastropoda
- Order: Littorinimorpha
- Family: Naticidae
- Genus: Natica
- Species: N. koperbergae

Binomial name
- Natica koperbergae van der Bijl & Moolenbeek, 2009

Species of gastropod

Natica koperbergae is a species of predatory sea snail, a marine gastropod mollusk in the family Naticidae, the moon snails.
