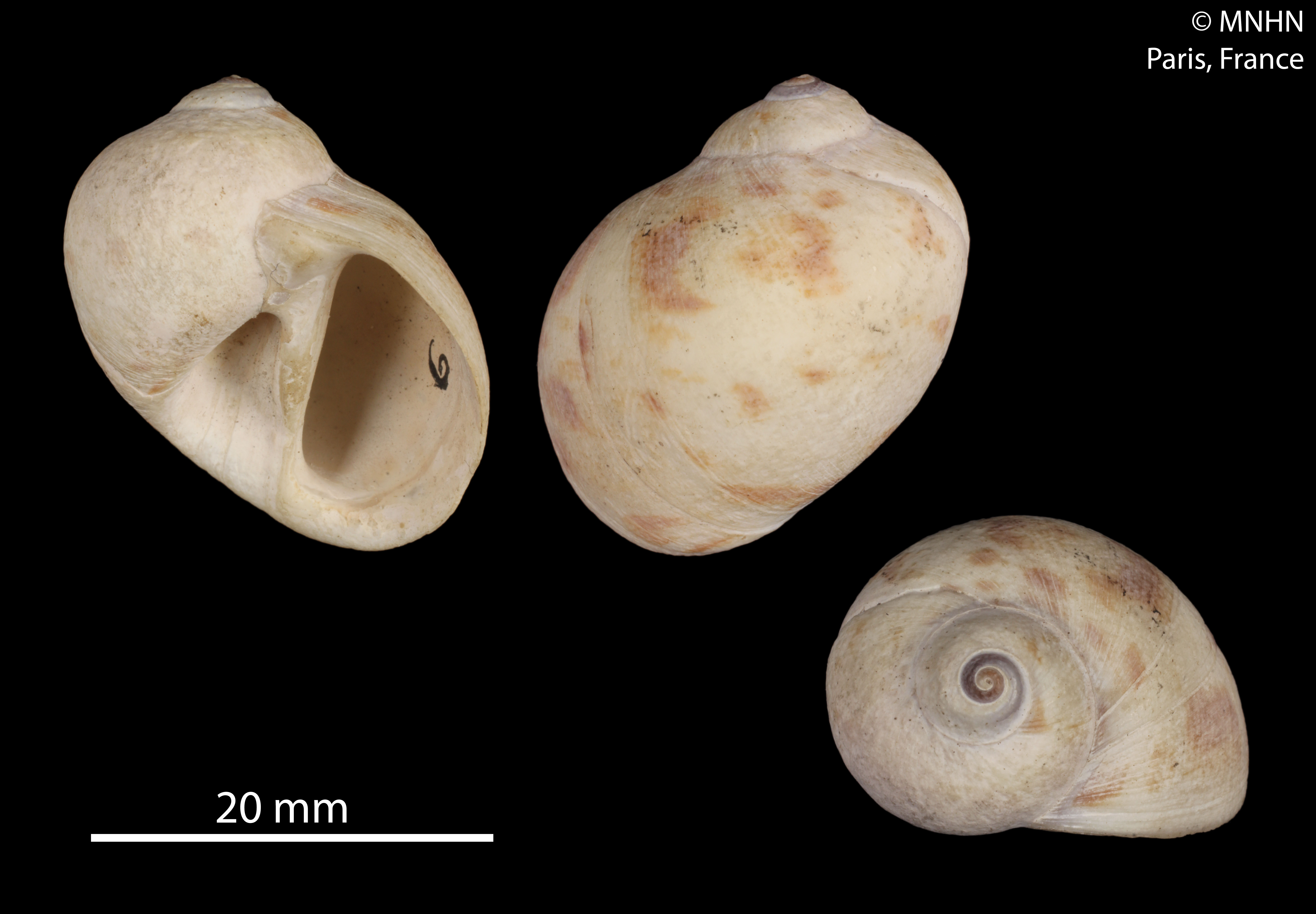
- Shell of Natica rouxi (paratype at MNHN, Paris)

Scientific classification
- Kingdom: Animalia
- Phylum: Mollusca
- Class: Gastropoda
- Subclass: Caenogastropoda
- Order: Littorinimorpha
- Family: Naticidae
- Genus: Natica
- Species: N. rouxi

Binomial name
- Natica rouxi Nicklès, 1952

Synonyms
- Euspira rouxi (Nicklès, 1952)

= Natica rouxi =

Species of gastropod

Natica rouxi is a species of predatory sea snail, a marine gastropod mollusk in the family Naticidae, the moon snails.

== Distribution ==
This marine species occurs off Gabon.
