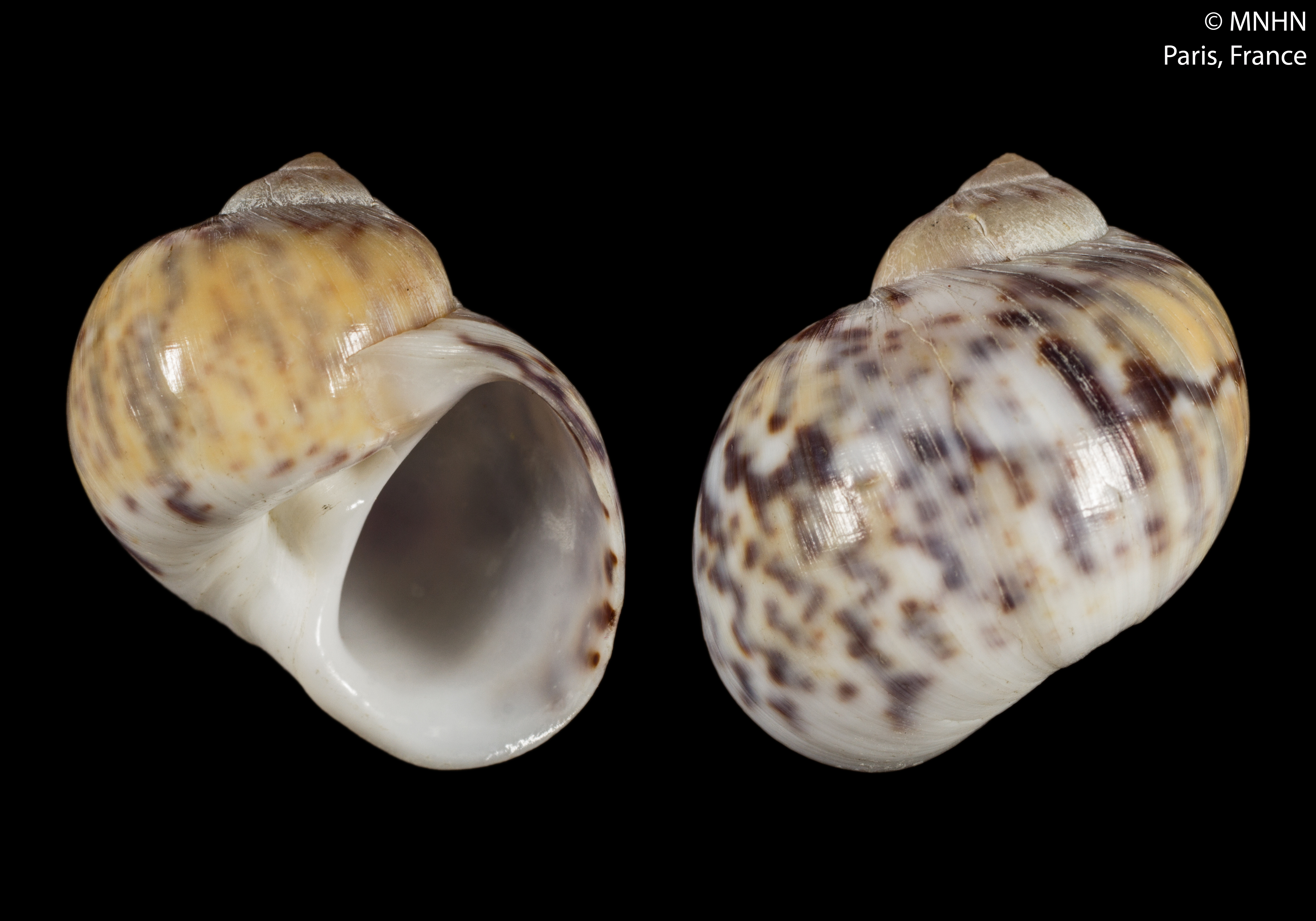
- Shell of Natica larvaroni (holotype at MNHN, Paris)

Scientific classification
- Kingdom: Animalia
- Phylum: Mollusca
- Class: Gastropoda
- Subclass: Caenogastropoda
- Order: Littorinimorpha
- Family: Naticidae
- Genus: Natica
- Species: N. larvaroni

Binomial name
- Natica larvaroni P. Bernard, 1983

= Natica larvaroni =

Species of gastropod

Natica larvaroni is a species of predatory sea snail, a marine gastropod mollusk in the family Naticidae, the moon snails.

== Description ==
The length of the shell attains 22.5 mm.

== Distribution ==
This marine species occurs off Gabon.
