= Natica michaelis =

Scientific classification
- Kingdom: Animalia
- Phylum: Mollusca
- Class: Gastropoda
- Subclass: Caenogastropoda
- Order: Littorinimorpha
- Family: Naticidae
- Genus: Natica
- Species: N. michaelis

Binomial name
- Natica michaelis Fischer-Piette, 1942

Species of gastropod

Natica michaelis is a species of predatory sea snail, a marine gastropod mollusk in the family Naticidae, the moon snails.
