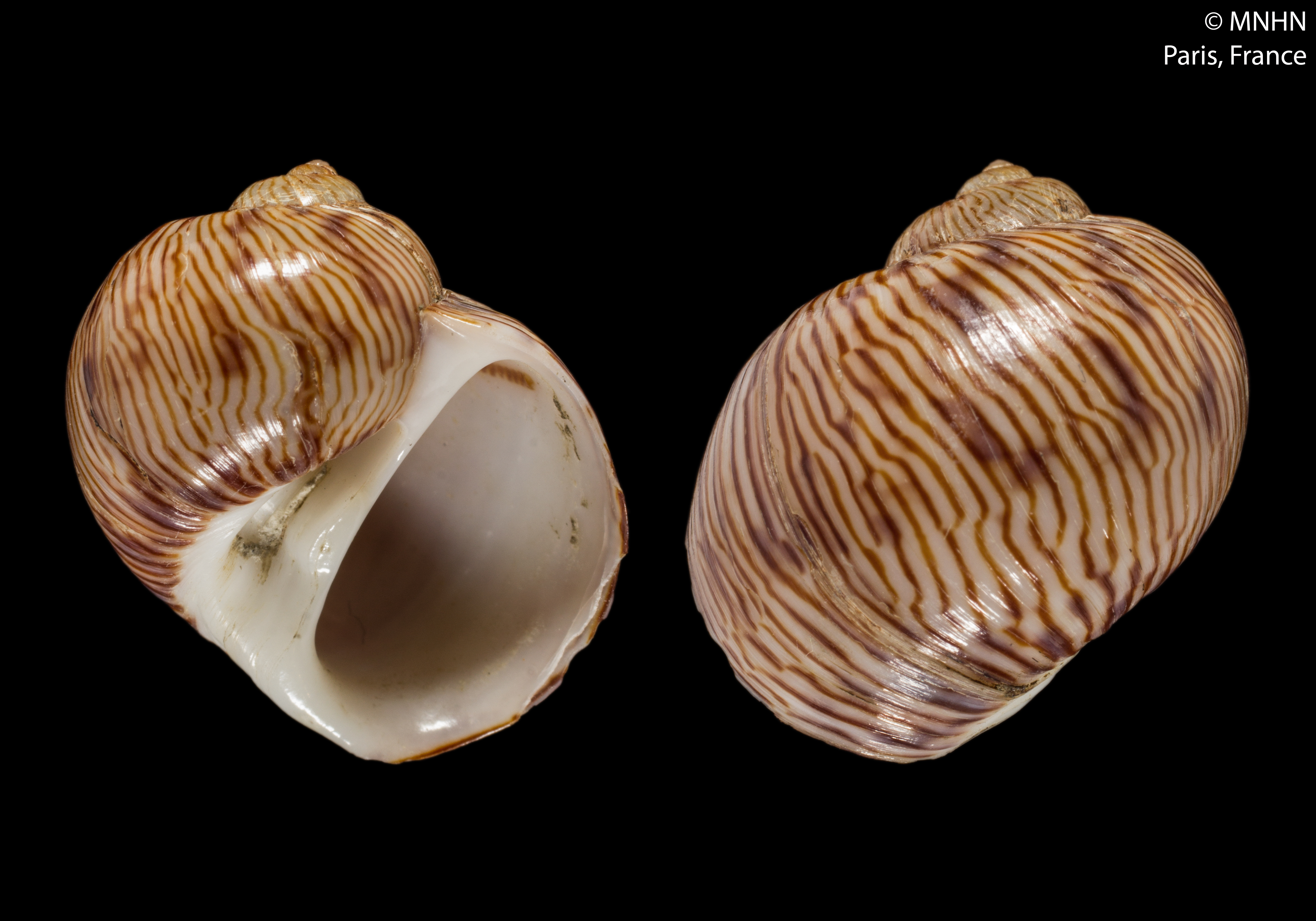
- Shell of Natica rubromaculata (holotype at MNHN, Paris)

Scientific classification
- Kingdom: Animalia
- Phylum: Mollusca
- Class: Gastropoda
- Subclass: Caenogastropoda
- Order: Littorinimorpha
- Family: Naticidae
- Genus: Natica
- Species: N. rubromaculata

Binomial name
- Natica rubromaculata E. A. Smith, 1872

Synonyms
- Natica brunoi P. Bernard, 1983

= Natica rubromaculata =

Species of gastropod

Natica rubromaculata is a species of predatory sea snail, a marine gastropod mollusk in the family Naticidae, the moon snails.

== Description ==
The length of the shell attains 20.2 mm.

== Distribution ==
This marine species occurs in the equatorial zone off Gabon.
