= Tectonatica rizzae =

Scientific classification
- Kingdom: Animalia
- Phylum: Mollusca
- Class: Gastropoda
- Subclass: Caenogastropoda
- Order: Littorinimorpha
- Family: Naticidae
- Genus: Tectonatica
- Species: T. rizzae

Binomial name
- Tectonatica rizzae (Philippi, 1844)

Synonyms
- Natica rizzae Philippi, 1844

Species of gastropod

Tectonatica rizzae is a species of predatory sea snail, a marine gastropod mollusk in the family Naticidae, the moon snails.
