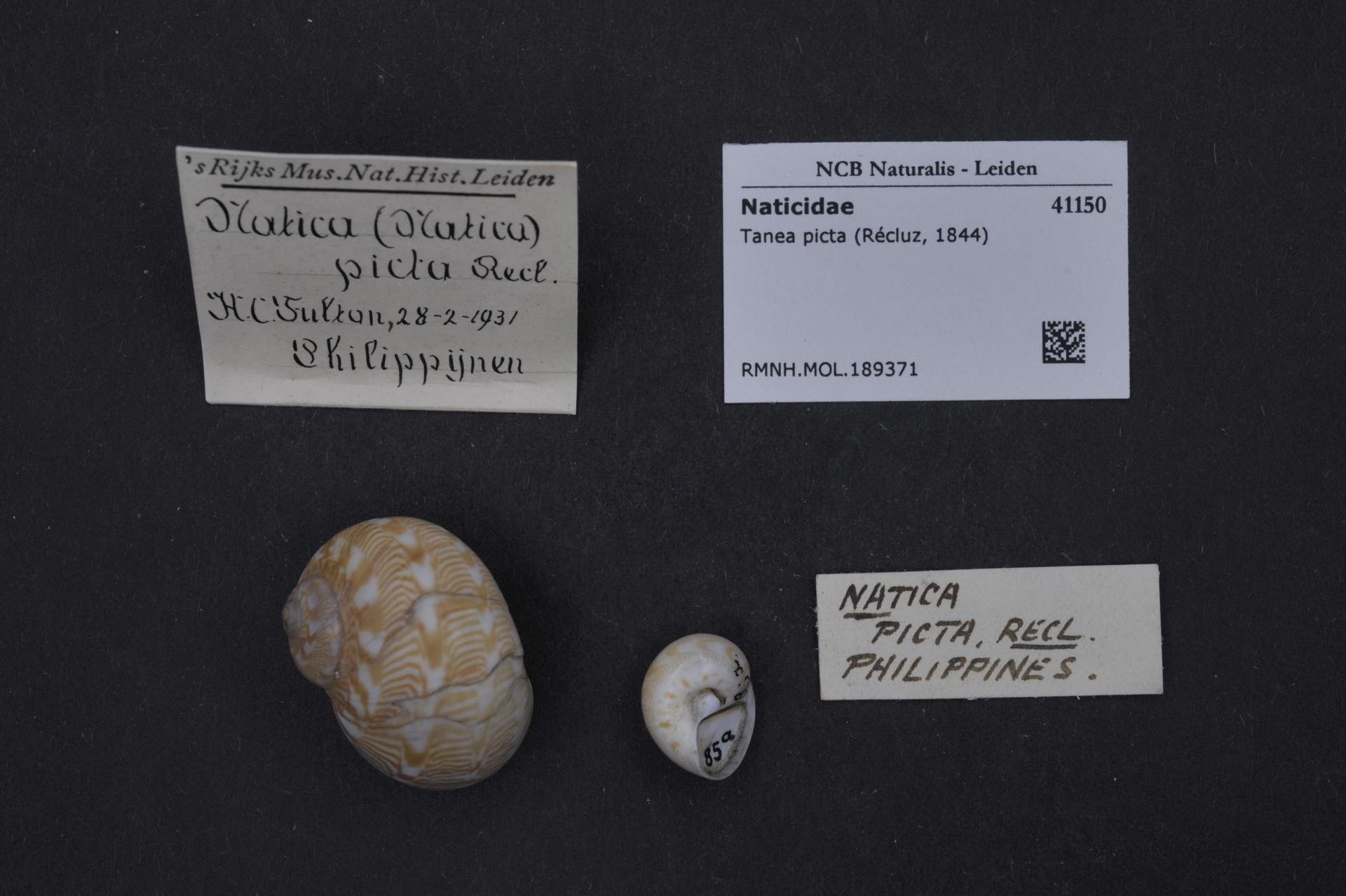
- Tanea picta

Scientific classification
- Kingdom: Animalia
- Phylum: Mollusca
- Class: Gastropoda
- Subclass: Caenogastropoda
- Order: Littorinimorpha
- Family: Naticidae
- Genus: Tanea
- Species: T. picta

Binomial name
- Tanea picta (Recluz, 1844)

Synonyms
- Natica (Notocochlis) picta Récluz, 1844; Natica elegans Récluz, 1850 (Invalid: junior homonym of Natica elegans J. Sowerby, 1836); Natica picta Récluz, 1844 (original combination)

= Tanea picta =

Species of gastropod

Tanea picta is a species of predatory sea snail, a marine gastropod mollusk in the family Naticidae, the moon snails.
