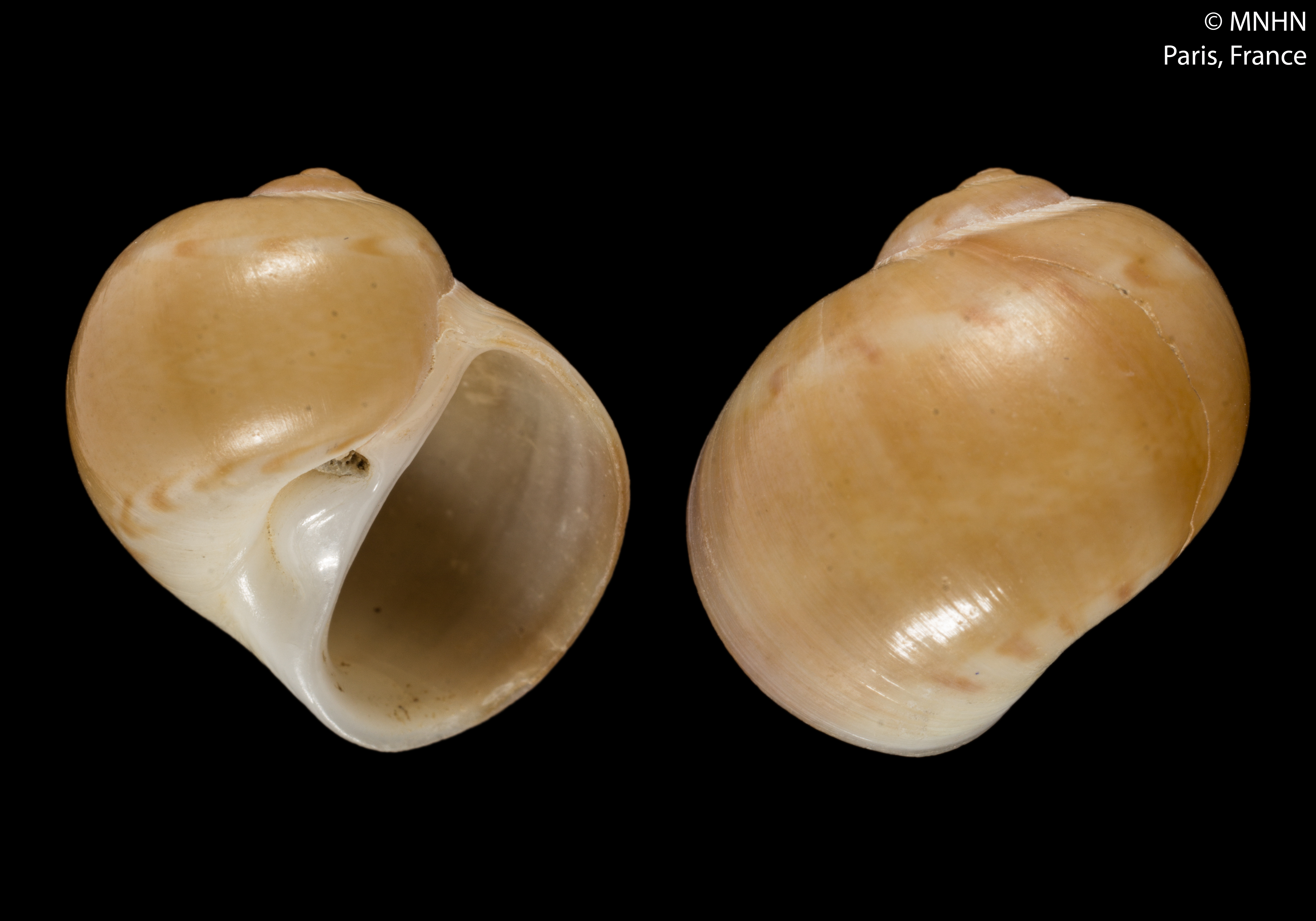
- Shell of Notocochlis cernica (syntype at MNHN, Paris)

Scientific classification
- Kingdom: Animalia
- Phylum: Mollusca
- Class: Gastropoda
- Subclass: Caenogastropoda
- Order: Littorinimorpha
- Family: Naticidae
- Genus: Notocochlis
- Species: N. cernica

Binomial name
- Notocochlis cernica (Jousseaume, 1874)

Synonyms
- Natica (Natica) cernica Jousseaume, 1874; Natica cernica Jousseaume, 1874 (basionym); Natica jousseaumei Euthyme, 1885; Natica nebulosa Schepman, 1909; Natica ochrostigmata Rehder, 1980; Notocochlis sagittata hancockae Powell, 1971

= Notocochlis cernica =

Species of gastropod

Notocochlis cernica is a species of predatory sea snail, a marine gastropod mollusk in the family Naticidae, the moon snails.

== Description ==
The length of the shell attains 15.7 mm.

== Distribution ==
This species occurs in the Indian Ocean off Mauritius in the Mascarene Basin.
