= Tectonatica sagraiana =

Scientific classification
- Kingdom: Animalia
- Phylum: Mollusca
- Class: Gastropoda
- Subclass: Caenogastropoda
- Order: Littorinimorpha
- Family: Naticidae
- Genus: Tectonatica
- Species: T. sagraiana

Binomial name
- Tectonatica sagraiana (d'Orbigny, 1842)

Synonyms
- Natica filosa Philippi, R.A., 1845; Natica flammulata Requien, 1848; Tectonatica filosa (Philippi, 1845)

Species of gastropod

Tectonatica sagraiana is a species of predatory sea snail, a marine gastropod mollusk in the family Naticidae, the moon snails.

== Description ==
The shell size varies between 5 mm and 21 mm.

== Distribution ==
This species is distributed in the Mediterranean Sea and in the Atlantic Ocean along Madeira, the Canaries, Cape Verde, and Angola.
