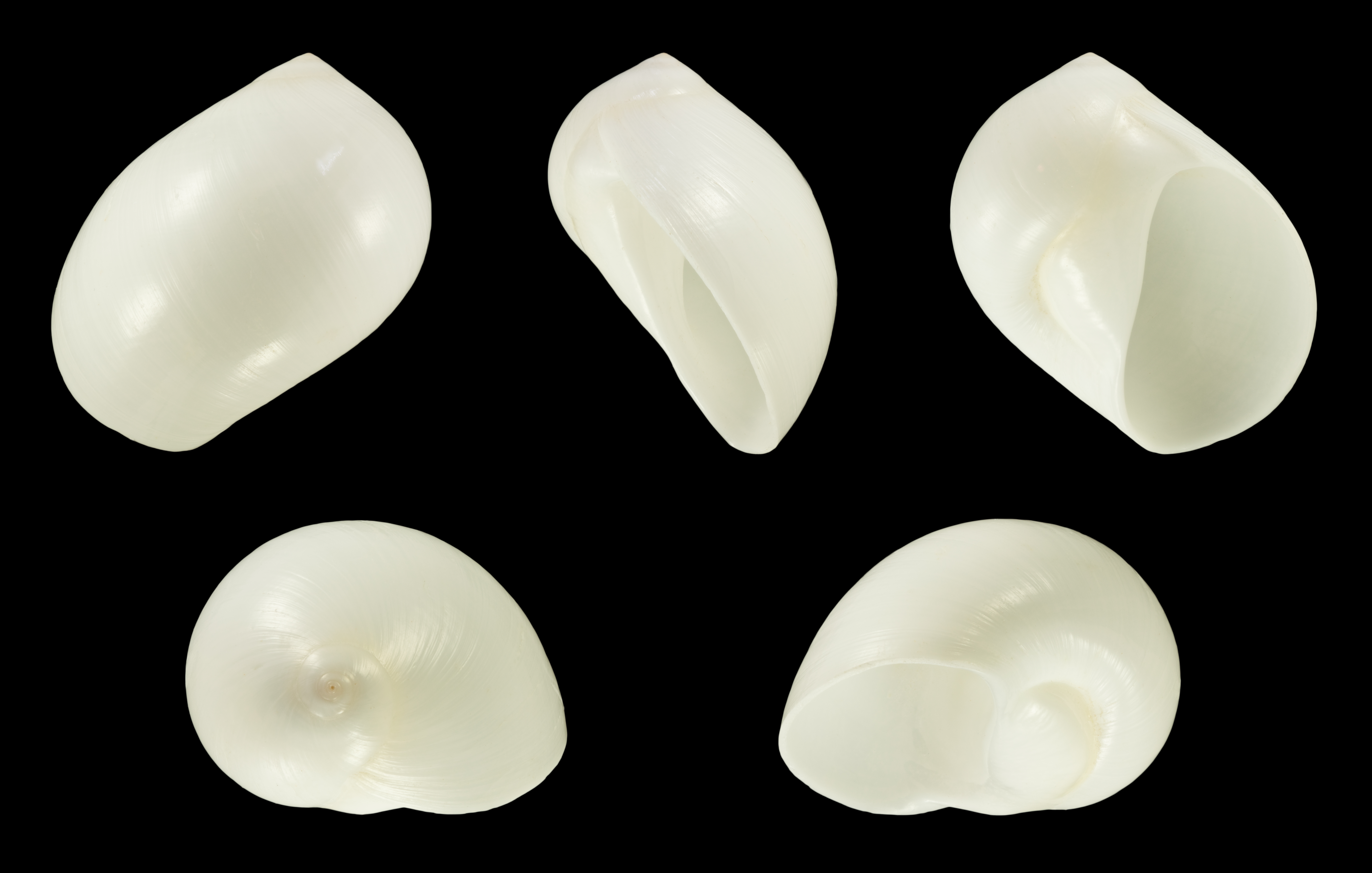

Scientific classification
- Kingdom: Animalia
- Phylum: Mollusca
- Class: Gastropoda
- Subclass: Caenogastropoda
- Order: Littorinimorpha
- Family: Naticidae
- Genus: Polinices
- Species: P. flemingianus

Binomial name
- Polinices flemingianus (Recluz, 1844)

Synonyms
- Natica flemingiana Récluz, 1844 (basionym); Natica galactites Philippi, 1851; Natica virginea Philippi, 1852 (doubtful synonym)

= Polinices flemingianus =

Species of gastropod

Polinices flemingianus is a species of predatory sea snail, a marine gastropod mollusk in the family Naticidae, the moon snails.

== Description ==
Polinices flemingianus is a species of predatory sea snail, a marine gastropod mollusk in the family Naticidae, the moon snails.

== Distribution ==
This species is distributed in the Indian Ocean along Aldabra, Chagos and the Mascarene Basin.
