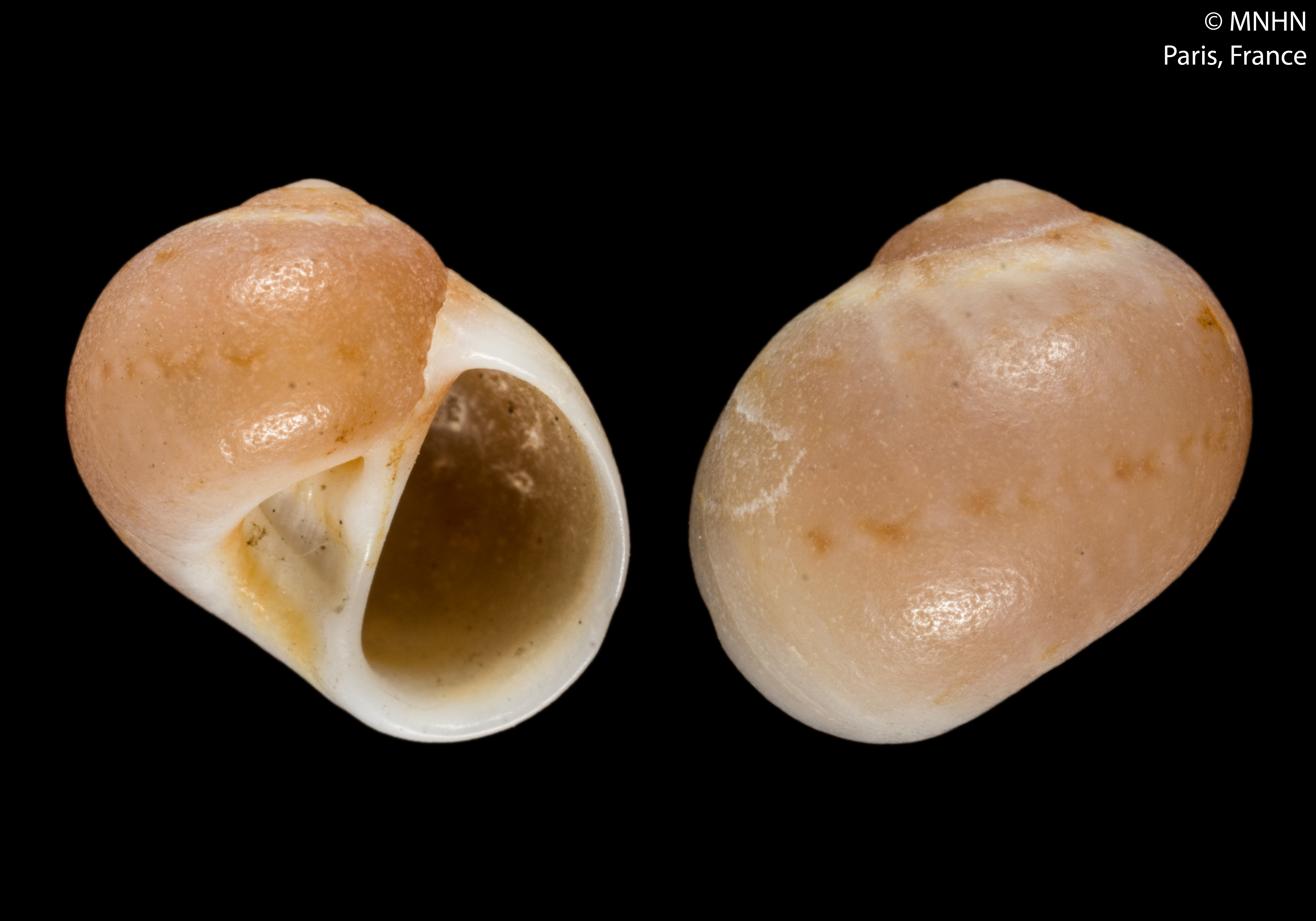
- Shell of Euspira guilleminii (lectotype at MNHN, Paris)

Scientific classification
- Kingdom: Animalia
- Phylum: Mollusca
- Class: Gastropoda
- Subclass: Caenogastropoda
- Order: Littorinimorpha
- Family: Naticidae
- Genus: Euspira
- Species: E. guilleminii

Binomial name
- Euspira guilleminii (Payraudeau, 1826)

Synonyms
- Lunatia guilleminii (Payraudeau, 1826); Natica guilleminii Payraudeau, 1826 (original combination); Natica marmorata Risso, 1826; Polinices guilleminii (Payraudeau, 1826)

= Euspira guilleminii =

Species of gastropod

Euspira guilleminii is a species of predatory sea snail, a marine gastropod mollusc in the family Naticidae, the moon snails.

== Description ==
The length of the shell attains 8.3 mm.

Euspira guilleminii feeds on mobile prey.

== Distribution ==
Euspira guilleminii is found in the Aegean Sea, the Black Sea, the Sea of Marmara, and the eastern basin of the Mediterranean Sea.
