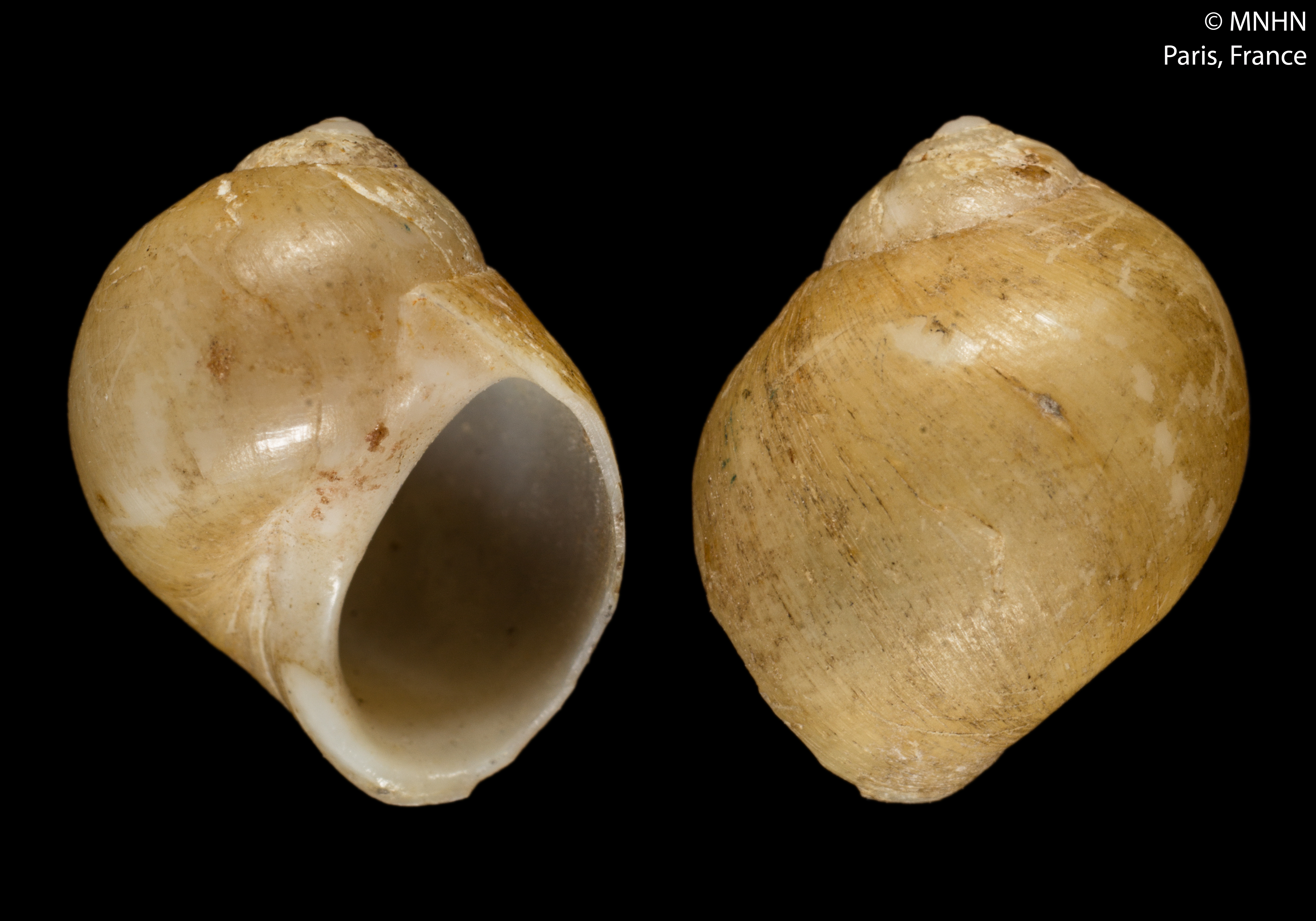
- Shell of Tectonatica impervia (syntype at MNHN, Paris)

Scientific classification
- Kingdom: Animalia
- Phylum: Mollusca
- Class: Gastropoda
- Subclass: Caenogastropoda
- Order: Littorinimorpha
- Family: Naticidae
- Genus: Tectonatica
- Species: T. impervia

Binomial name
- Tectonatica impervia (Philippi, 1845)

Synonyms
- Natica acuta Philippi, 1845 (not Deshayes, 1838; Natica philippiana Nyst, 1845 is a replacement name); Natica impervia Philippi, 1845 (basionym); Natica payeni Rochebrune & Mabille, 1885; Natica philippiana Nyst, 1845 (not Recluz, 1843)

= Tectonatica impervia =

Species of gastropod

Tectonatica impervia is a species of predatory sea snail, a marine gastropod mollusc in the family Naticidae, the moon snails.

== Description ==
The maximum recorded shell length is 18.1 mm.

== Distribution ==
This marine species occurs off Chile.

== Habitat ==
Minimum recorded depth is 5 m. Maximum recorded depth is 460 m.
