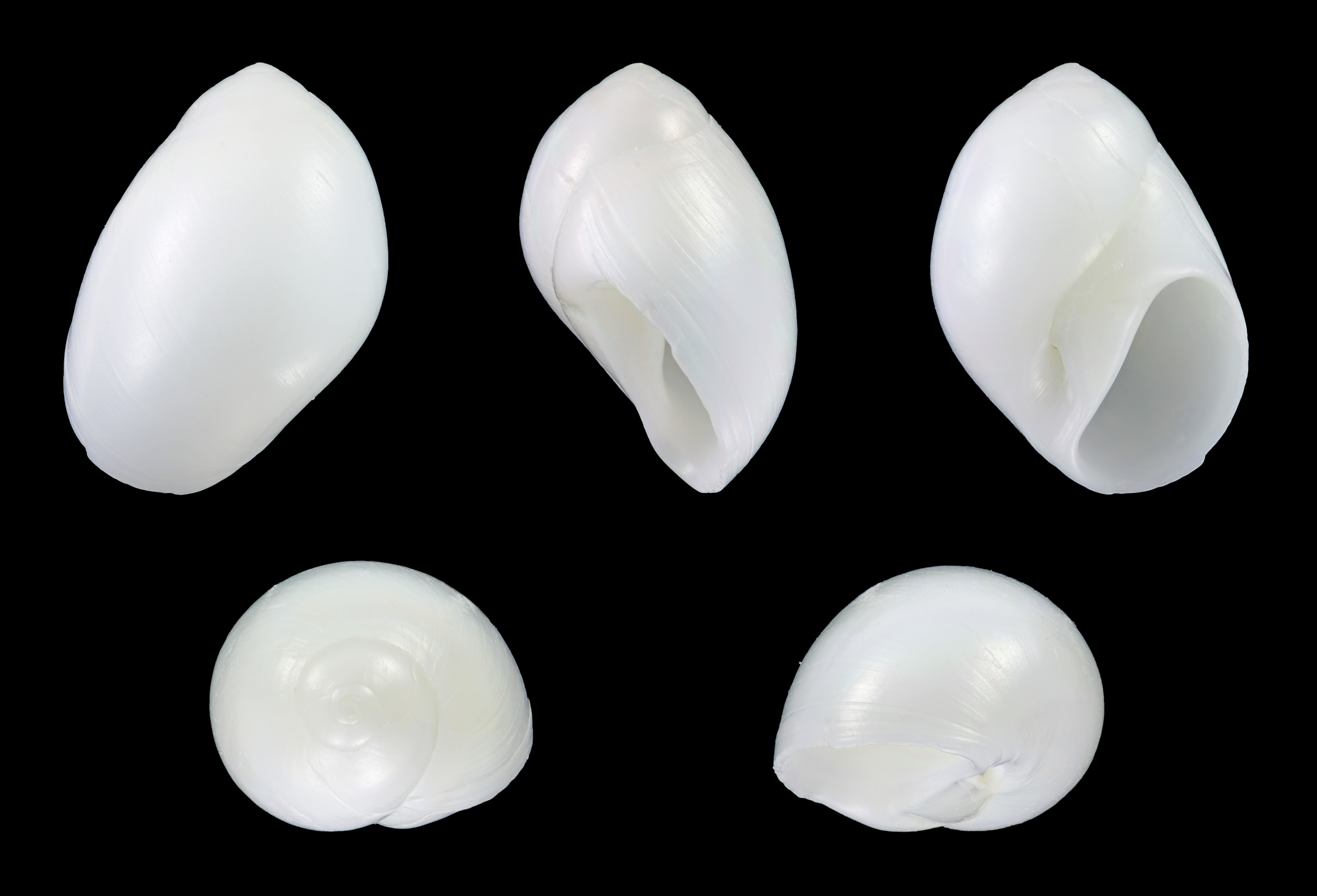
- Polinices lacteus shell

Scientific classification
- Kingdom: Animalia
- Phylum: Mollusca
- Class: Gastropoda
- Subclass: Caenogastropoda
- Order: Littorinimorpha
- Superfamily: Naticoidea
- Family: Naticidae
- Genus: Polinices; Montfort, 1810

Type species
- Polinices albus Montfort, 1810

Synonyms
- Albula Röding, 1798 (Invalid: junior homonym of Albula Osbeck, 1762 [Pisces]); Eucaryum Ehrenberg, 1831; Mamillaria Swainson, 1840; Mamma H. Adams & A. Adams, 1853 (junior synonym); Mammillaria Herrmannsen, 1847 (Unjustified emendation); Natica (Mamma) H. Adams & A. Adams, 1853; Natica (Polinices) Montfort, 1810; Naticella Swainson, 1840; Naticina Guilding, 1834; Polinices (Polinices) Montfort, 1810· accepted, alternate representation; Polynices Herrmannsen, 1847 (Invalid: unjustified emendation of Polinices); † Uba [sic] (Incorrect subsequent spelling); Uber Philippi, 1853

= Polinices =

Genus of gastropods

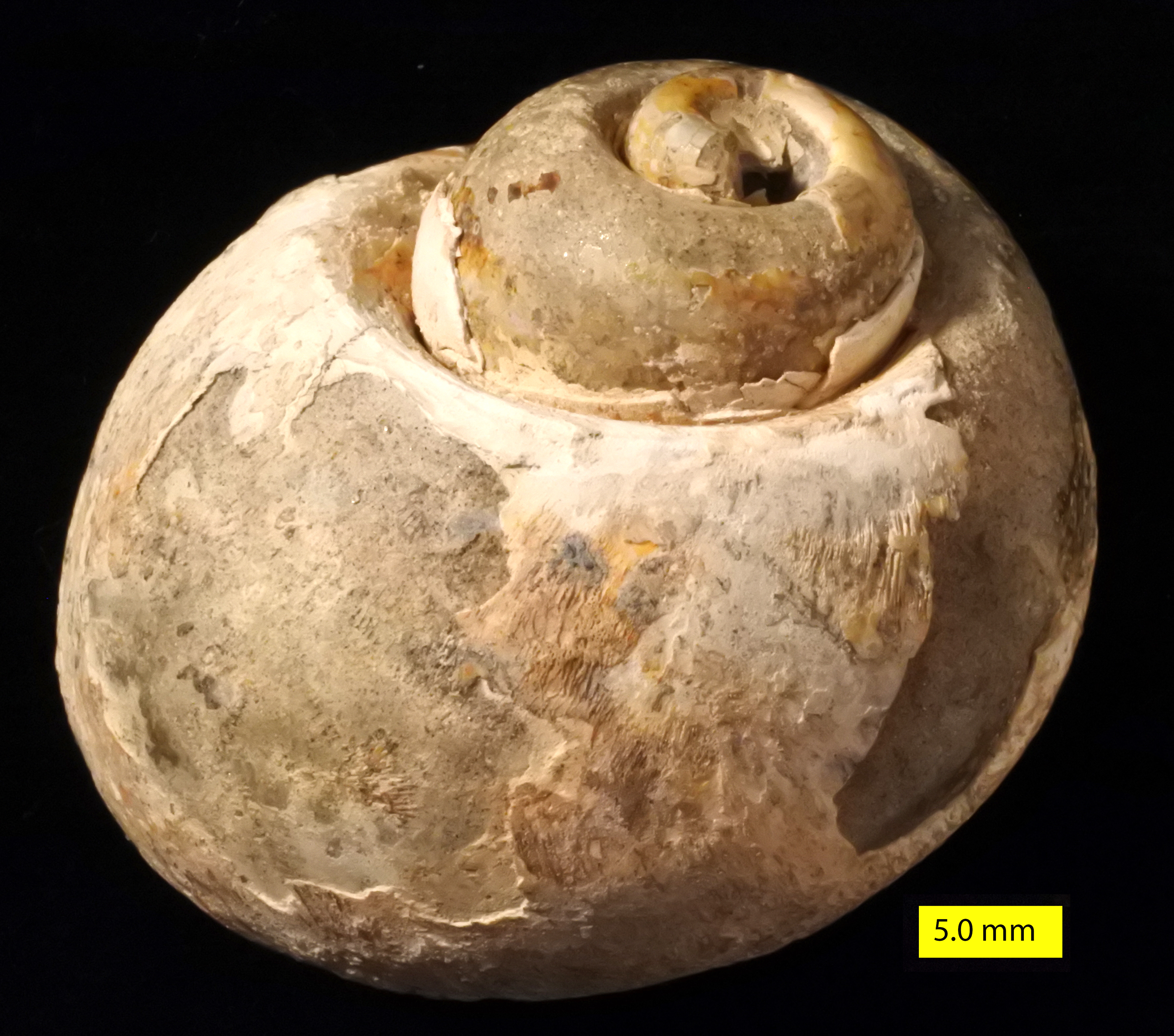
Polinices galianor from the Pliocene of San Diego County, California.

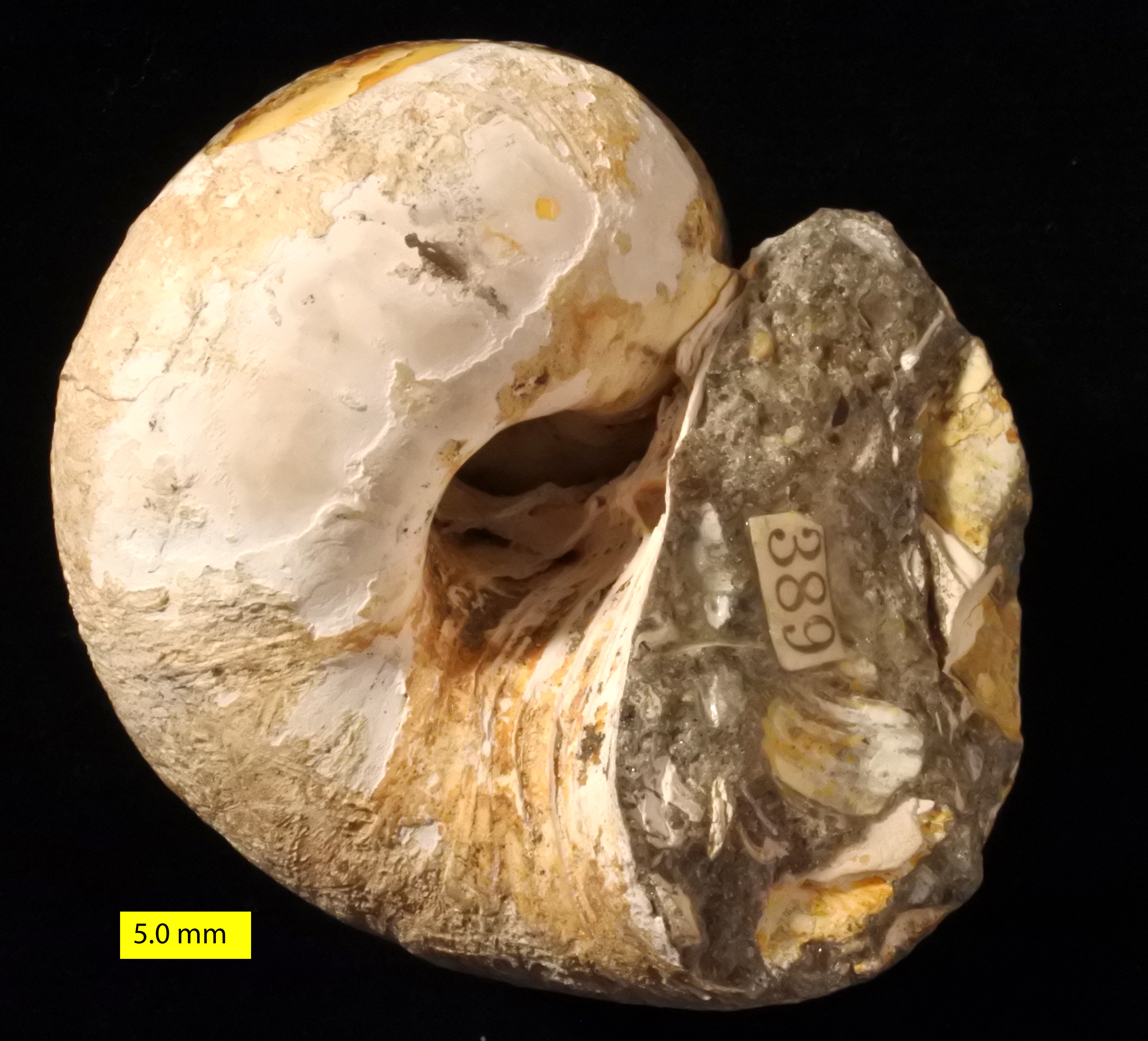
Polinices galianor umbilicus; Pliocene of San Diego County, California.

Polinices is a genus of predatory sea snails, marine gastropod molluscs in the subfamily Polinicinae of the family Naticidae, commonly known as moon snails.

== Species ==
Species within the genus Polinices include:

- Polinices albumen (Linnaeus, 1758)
- Polinices alveatus (Troschel, 1852)
- Polinices amiculatus (Philippi, 1849)
- Polinices aurantius (Röding, 1798)
- Polinices bifasciatus (Griffith & Pidgeon, 1834)
- Polinices candidissimus (Le Guillou, 1842)
- † Polinices cerovaensis Harzhauser, 2011
- † Polinices chattonensis (Marwick, 1924)
- Polinices citrinus (Philippi, 1851)
- Polinices cleistopsila Barnard, 1963
- Polinices constanti Huelsken & Hollmann, 2012
- Polinices cora (d'Orbigny, 1840)
- Polinices cumingianus (Récluz, 1844)
- Polinices effusus (Swainson, 1840)
- † Polinices fallai (Fletcher, 1938)
- Polinices flemingianus (Recluz, 1844)
- Polinices grunerianus (Philippi, 1852)
- Polinices hacketti Marincovich, 1975
- Polinices hepaticus (Röding, 1798) - brown moonsnail
- † Polinices huttoni Ihering, 1907
- Polinices immaculatus (Totten, 1835)
- Polinices intemeratus (Philippi, 1853)
- † Polinices intracrassus Finlay, 1924
- Polinices jukesii (Reeve, 1855)
- Polinices lacteus (Guilding, 1834) - milk moonsnail
- † Polinices laxus (Finlay, 1926)
- Polinices leptaleus Watson, 1881
- Polinices limi Pilsbry, 1931
- † Polinices lobatus (Marwick, 1924)
- † Polinices mackayi Marwick, 1931
- Polinices mammilla (Linnaeus, 1758)
- Polinices mediopacificus Kosuge, 1979
- Polinices mellosus (Hedley, 1924)
- † Polinices mucronatus (Marwick, 1924)
- † Polinices oneroaensis Powell & Bartrum, 1929
- † Polinices otaioensis Marwick, 1960
- Polinices otis G.B. Broderip & Sowerby I, 1829
- Polinices paciae Bozzetti, 1997
- Polinices panamaensis (Récluz, 1844)
- † Polinices parki Finlay & Marwick, 1937
- Polinices perspicuus (Récluz, 1850)
- Polinices peselephanti (Link, 1807)
- Polinices powisianus (Récluz, 1844)
- † Polinices propeovatus (Marwick, 1924)
- Polinices psilus (Watson, 1886)
- Polinices putealis Garrard, 1961
- † Polinices redemptus (Michelotti, 1847)
- Polinices sagamiensis Pilsbry, 1904
- † Polinices sagenus Suter, 1917
- Polinices tawhitirahia Powell, 1965
- Polinices uber (Valenciennes, 1832)
- Polinices uberinus (d'Orbigny, 1842) - dwarf white moonsnail, white moonsnail
- † Polinices unisulcatus (Marwick, 1924)
- Polinices vavaosi (Reeve, 1855)
- Polinices vestitus Kuroda, 1961
- † Polinices waipaensis (Marwick, 1924)
- † Polinices waipipiensis (Marwick, 1924)

Species brought into synonymy

- Polinices agujanus Dall, 1908: synonym of Lunatia agujana (Dall, 1908)
- Polinices albus Montfort, 1810: synonym of Polinices mammilla (Linnaeus, 1758)
- Polinices alderi (Forbes, 1838): synonym of Euspira pulchella (Risso, 1826)
- Polinices aulacoglossa Pilsbry & Vanatta, 1909: synonym of Glossaulax aulacoglossa (Pilsbry & Vanatta, 1909)
- Polinices bahamensis (Dall, 1825): synonym of Sigatica semisulcata (Gray, 1839)
- Polinices bathyraphe Pilsbry, 1911: synonym of Sigatica bathyraphe (Pilsbry, 1911)
- Polinices blaesus Marwick, 1929 †: synonym of Polinella blaesa (Marwick, 1929) †
- Polinices blaizensis Kilburn, 1976: synonym of Euspira blaizensis (Kilburn, 1976) (original combination)
- Polinices caprae (Philippi, 1852): synonym of Mammilla caprae (Philippi, 1852)
- Polinices columnaris (Récluz, 1850): synonym of Polinices peselephanti (Link, 1807)
- Polinices conicus (Lamarck, 1822): synonym of Conuber conicum (Lamarck, 1822)
- Polinices creper Marwick, 1965 †: synonym of Polinella creper (Marwick, 1965) † (original combination)
- Polinices didyma (Röding, 1798): synonym of Neverita didyma (Röding, 1798)
- Polinices draconis (Dall, 1903): synonym of Glossaulax draconis (Dall, 1903)
- Polinices dubius (Récluz, 1844): synonym of Polinices constanti Huelsken & Hollmann, 2012
- Polinices duplicatus (Say, 1822): synonym of Neverita duplicata (Say, 1822)
- Polinices ephebus Hedley, 1915: synonym of Glossaulax epheba (Hedley, 1915)
- Polinices fibrosa (Souleyet, 1852): synonym of Mammilla fibrosa (Gray, 1850)
- Polinices fringillus (Dall, 1881): synonym of Euspira fringilla (Dall, 1881)
- Polinices fryei Laws, 1933 †: synonym of Polinella fryei (Laws, 1933) † (original combination)
- Polinices fuscus (Blainville, 1825): synonym of Lunatia fusca (Blainville, 1825)
- Polinices galapagosus (Récluz, 1844): synonym of Polinices otis (Broderip & G.B. Sowerby I, 1829)
- Polinices gradisuturalis Marwick, 1932 †: synonym of Polinella gradisuturalis (Marwick, 1932) †
- Polinices groenlandica [sic]: synonym of Polinices groenlandicus (Møller, 1842): synonym of Euspira pallida (Broderip & G. B. Sowerby I, 1829) (incorrect gender ending)
- Polinices groenlandicus (Møller, 1842): synonym of Euspira pallida (Broderip & G. B. Sowerby I, 1829)
- Polinices grossularia Marche-Marchad, 1957: synonym of Lunatia grossularia (Marche-Marchad, 1957)
- Polinices guilleminii (Payraudeau, 1826): synonym of Euspira guilleminii (Payraudeau, 1826)
- Polinices helicoides (Gray, 1825): synonym of Hypterita helicoides (Gray, 1825)
- Polinices heros Say, 1822: synonym of Euspira heros (Say, 1822)
- Polinices incei (Philippi, 1853): synonym of Conuber incei (Philippi, 1853)
- Polinices kurodai Iw. Taki, 1944: synonym of Mammilla kurodai (Iw. Taki, 1944)
- Polinices lewisii: synonym of Euspira lewisii (Gould, 1847)
- Polinices litorinus Dall, 1908: synonym of Lunatia litorina (Dall, 1908)
- Polinices macilenta (Philippi, 1844): synonym of Lunatia macilenta (Philippi, 1844)
- Polinices macrostoma (Philippi, 1852): synonym of Mammilla kurodai (Iw. Taki, 1944)
- Polinices mamilla [sic]: synonym of Polinices mammilla (Linnaeus, 1758)
- Polinices mammata [sic]: synonym of Polinices mammatus (Röding, 1798): synonym of Mammilla mammata (Röding, 1798) (incorrect gender ending)
- Polinices maurus (Lamarck, 1816): synonym of Mammilla maura (Lamarck, 1816)
- Polinices melanostoma (Gmelin, 1791): synonym of Mammilla melanostoma (Gmelin, 1791)
- Polinices motutaraensis Powell, 1935 †: synonym of Taniella motutaraensis (Powell, 1935) †
- Polinices nanus Möller, 1842: synonym of Pseudopolinices nanus (Möller, 1842)
- Polinices napus (E.A. Smith, 1904): synonym of Euspira napus (E.A. Smith, 1904)
- Polinices nubilus (Dall, 1889): synonym of Payraudeautia nubila (Dall, 1889)
- Polinices obtusa (Jeffreys, 1885): synonym of Neverita obtusa (Jeffreys, 1885)
- Polinices opaca [sic]: synonym of Polinices opacus (Récluz, 1851): synonym of Mammilla melanostoma (Gmelin, 1791) (incorrect gender ending)
- Polinices opacus (Récluz, 1851): synonym of Mammilla melanostoma (Gmelin, 1791)
- Polinices pallidus (Broderip & Sowerby, 1829): synonym of Lunatia pallida (Broderip & G.B. Sowerby I, 1829)
- Polinices pardoanus Dall, 1908: synonym of Lunatia pardoana (Dall, 1908)
- Polinices parvulus Bozzetti, 2010: synonym of Notocochlis gualteriana (Récluz, 1844)
- Polinices patagonicus (Philippi, 1845): synonym of Falsilunatia patagonica (Philippi, 1845)
- Polinices pila Pilsbry, 1911: synonym of Lunatia pila (Pilsbry, 1911)
- Polinices planispirus Suter, 1917 †: synonym of Magnatica planispira (Suter, 1917) † (original combination)
- Polinices porcelanus (d'Orbigny, 1839): synonym of Polinices lacteus (Guilding, 1834)
- Polinices presubplicata Bouchet & Warén, 1993: synonym of Euspira presubplicata (Bouchet & Warén, 1993)
- Polinices priamus (Récluz, 1843): synonym of Mammilla priamus (Récluz, 1844)
- Polinices pseudovitreus Finlay, 1924 †: synonym of Uberella pseudovitrea (Finlay, 1924) †
- Polinices psila [sic]: synonym of Polinices psilus (R. B. Watson, 1886) (incorrect gender ending)
- Polinices pulchella (Risso, 1826): synonym of Euspira pulchella (Risso, 1826)
- Polinices pyriformis (Récluz, 1844): synonym of Polinices mammilla (Linnaeus, 1758)
- Polinices rapulum (Reeve, 1855): synonym of Polinices intemeratus (Philippi, 1853)
- Polinices ravidus (Souleyet, 1852): synonym of Polinices amiculatus (Philippi, 1849)
- Polinices reclusianus (Deshayes, 1839): synonym of Glossaulax reclusiana (Deshayes, 1839)
- Polinices recluzianus (Deshayes, 1839): synonym of Glossaulax reclusiana (Deshayes, 1839)
- Polinices sandwichensis Dall, 1895: synonym of Natica sandwichensis (Dall, 1895)
- Polinices sebae (Récluz, 1844): synonym of Mammilla sebae (Récluz, 1844)
- Polinices simiae (Deshayes, 1838): synonym of Mammilla simiae (Deshayes, 1838)
- Polinices sordidus (Swainson, 1821): synonym of Conuber sordidum (Swainson, 1821)
- Polinices stanleyi Marwick, 1948 †: synonym of Polinices waipipiensis (Marwick, 1924) † (synonym)
- Polinices subplicata (Jeffreys, 1885): synonym of Euspira subplicata (Jeffreys, 1885)
- Polinices tawhitirahia Powell, 1965: synonym of Polinices mellosum (Hedley, 1924)
- Polinices triseriata (Say, 1826): synonym of Lunatia triseriata (Say, 1826)
- Polinices tumidus (Swainson, 1840): synonym of Polinices mammilla (Linnaeus, 1758)
- Polinices unimaculatus (Reeve, 1855): synonym of Polinices otis (Broderip & G.B. Sowerby I, 1829)
- Polinices yokoyamai Kuroda & Habe, 1952: synonym of Euspira yokoyamai (Kuroda & Habe, 1952)
- Polinices zanzibarica Recluz, 1844: synonym of Mammilla sebae (Récluz, 1844)
