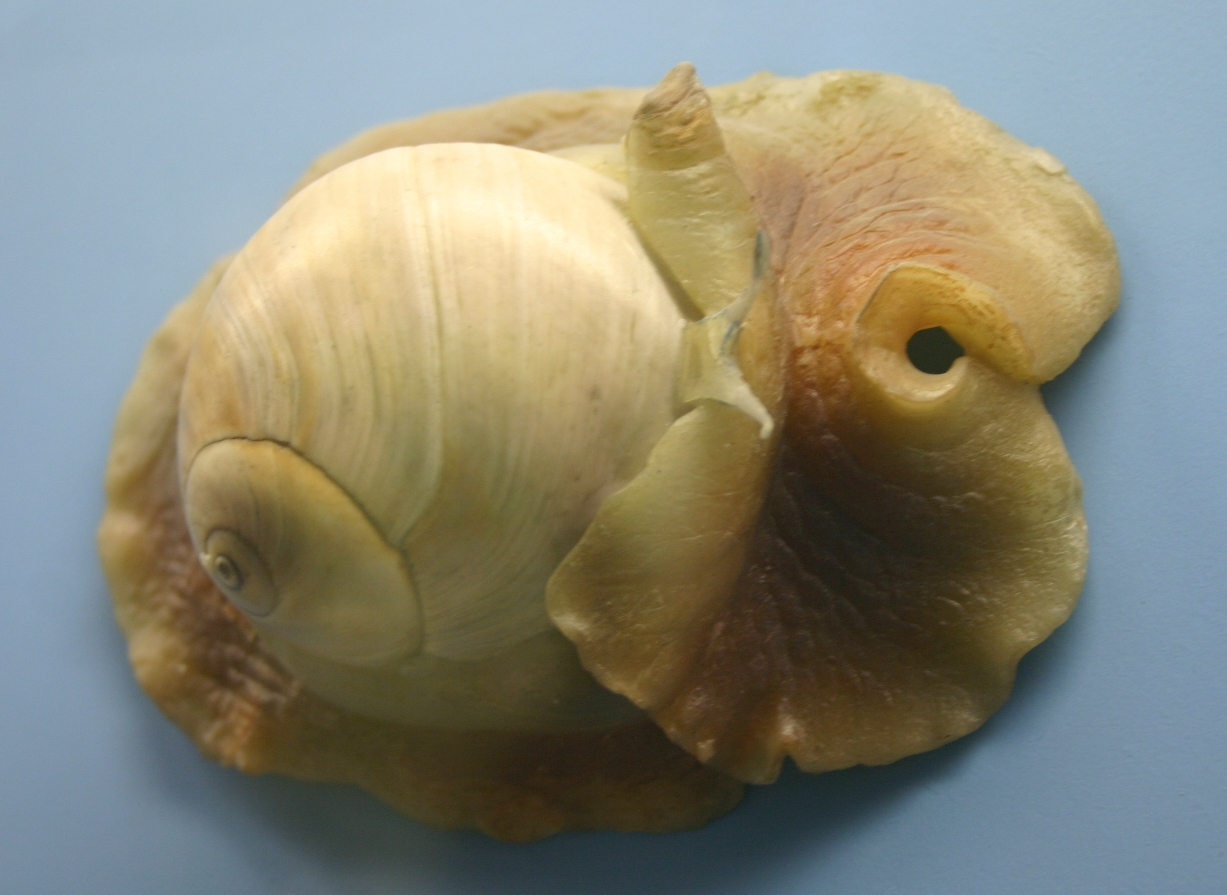
- A model of a live Neverita duplicata

Scientific classification
- Kingdom: Animalia
- Phylum: Mollusca
- Class: Gastropoda
- Subclass: Caenogastropoda
- Order: Littorinimorpha
- Superfamily: Naticoidea
- Family: Naticidae
- Genus: Neverita; Risso, 1826

Type species
- Neverita josephinia Risso, 1826

Synonyms
- Natica (Neverita); Neverita (Neverita) Risso, 1826· accepted, alternate representation; Polinices (Neverita) Risso, 1826; Uber (Neverita) Risso, 1826

= Neverita =

Genus of molluscs

Neverita is a genus of medium-sized to large sea snails, marine gastropod molluscs in the subfamily Polinicinae of the family Naticidae, the moon snails

The type species of this genus is Neverita josephinia Risso, 1826.

== Species ==
Species within the genus Neverita include:

- † Neverita amerrukensis Pacaud & Lebrun, 2019
- Neverita aulacoglossa (Pilsbry & Vanatta, 1909)
- Neverita delessertiana (Recluz in Chenu, 1843)
- Neverita didyma (Röding, 1798)
- Neverita duplicata (Say, 1822)
- Neverita josephinia Risso, 1826 Huelsken, T. et al. (2008) The Naticidae (Mollusca: Gastropoda) of Isola del Giglio (Tuscany, Italy): Shell characters, live animals, and a molecular analysis of egg masses. Zootaxa, 1770:1-40.
- Neverita lamonae Marincovich, 1975
- Neverita lewisii (Gould, 1847)
- † Neverita olla (de Serres, 1829)
- † Neverita pontis(Marwick, 1924)

Species brought into synonymy

- Neverita albumen (Linnaeus, 1758): synonym of Polinices albumen (Linnaeus, 1758)
- Neverita ampla (Philippi, 1849): synonym of Glossaulax didyma ampla (Philippi, 1849)
- Neverita hayashii Azuma, 1961: synonym of Glossaulax didyma hayashii (Azuma, 1961)
- Neverita hosoyai Kira, 1959: synonym of Glossaulax didyma hosoyai (Kira, 1959)
- Neverita nana (Møller, 1842): synonym of Pseudopolinices nanus (Møller, 1842)
- Neverita obtusa (Jeffreys, 1885): synonym of Euspira obtusa (Jeffreys, 1885)
- Neverita peselephanti ' (Link, 1807): synonym of Polinices peselephanti (Link, 1807)
- Neverita pilula Locard, 1897: synonym of Neverita obtusa (Jeffreys, 1885)
- Neverita politiana ' (Dall, 1919): synonym of Euspira pallida (Broderip & G.B. Sowerby I, 1829)
- Neverita reclusiana (Deshayes, 1839): synonym of Glossaulax reclusiana (Deshayes, 1839)
- Neverita reiniana Dunker, 1877: synonym of Glossaulax reiniana (Dunker, 1877) (original combination)
- Neverita robusta Dunker, 1860: synonym of Glossaulax didyma ampla (Philippi, 1849)
- Neverita secta Gabb, 1864: synonym of Glossaulax reclusiana (Deshayes, 1839)
