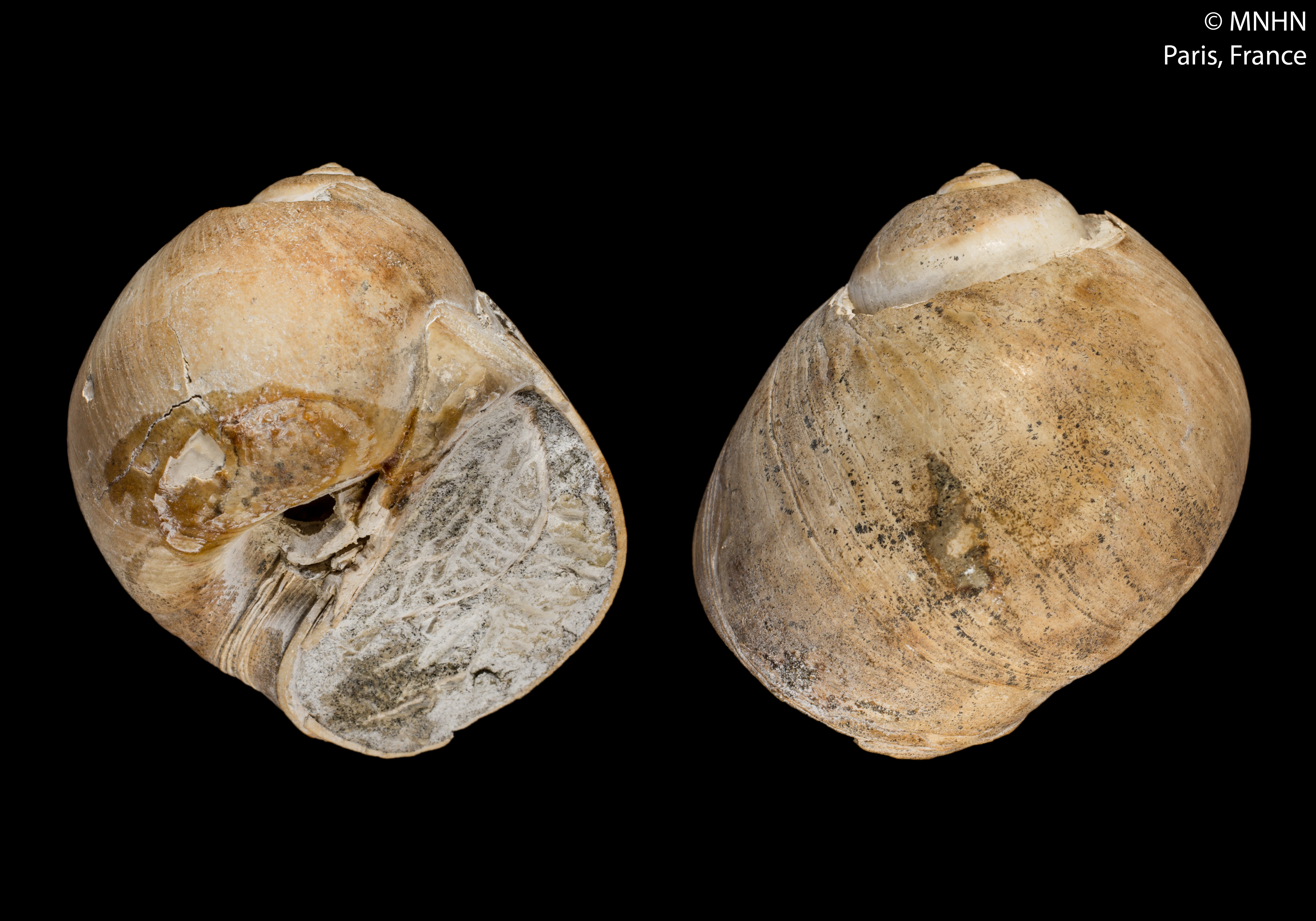
- Shell of † Glossaulax secunda (Rochebrune & Mabille, 1885) (syntype at MNHN, Paris)

Scientific classification
- Kingdom: Animalia
- Phylum: Mollusca
- Class: Gastropoda
- Subclass: Caenogastropoda
- Order: Littorinimorpha
- Family: Naticidae
- Genus: Glossaulax; Pilsbry, 1929

Type species
- Natica reclusiana Deshayes, 1839

Synonyms
- Neverita (Glossaulax) Pilsbry, 1929 (original rank); Polinices (Glossaulax) Pilsbry, 1929

= Glossaulax =

Genus of Gastropoda

Glossaulax is a genus of large sea snails, marine gastropod mollusks in the family Naticidae, the moon snails.

== Species ==
- Glossaulax draconis (Dall, 1903)
- Glossaulax epheba (Hedley, 1915)
- Glossaulax petiveriana (Récluz, 1843)
- Glossaulax reclusiana (Deshayes, 1839)
- Glossaulax reiniana (Dunker, 1877)
- † Glossaulax secunda (Rochebrune & Mabille, 1885) - extinct
- Glossaulax vesicalis (Philippi, 1849)

Species brought into synonymy

- Glossaulax aulacoglossa (Pilsbry & Vanatta, 1909): synonym of Neverita aulacoglossa (Pilsbry & Vanatta, 1909)
- Glossaulax bicolor (Philippi, 1849): synonym of Glossaulax petiveriana (Récluz, 1843)
- Glossaulax didyma (Röding, 1798): synonym of Neverita didyma (Röding, 1798)

== Feeding habits ==
As is true of all naticid genera, species in this genus are carnivorous and predatory.
