= Sebae =

Sebae may refer to:

== Animals ==
- Sebae anemone, a species of sea anemone

=== As part of a species name ===
Sebae is a specific name for several species:

- Amphiprion sebae, the sebae clownfish
- Aranea sebae, a synonym for the northern/giant golden orb weaver
- Argonauta sebae, an alternate name for the greater argonaut
- Lutjanus sebae, the emperor red snapper
- Mammilla sebae, a predatory sea snail
- Monodactylus sebae, the African moonyfish
- Ninia sebae, the redback coffee snake
- Python sebae, the African rock python

== Other uses ==
- Sebae, a Korean New Year ritual
- Shareef Al-Sebae, a player on the Syria national under-17 football team
