= C. sordidus =

C. sordidus may refer to:

- Citharichthys sordidus, the Pacific sanddab, a flatfish species
- Chlorurus sordidus, a fish species
- Cynanthus sordidus, the dusky hummingbird, a bird species

== Synonyms ==
- Conuber sordidus, a synonym for Conuber sordidum, a sea snail species
