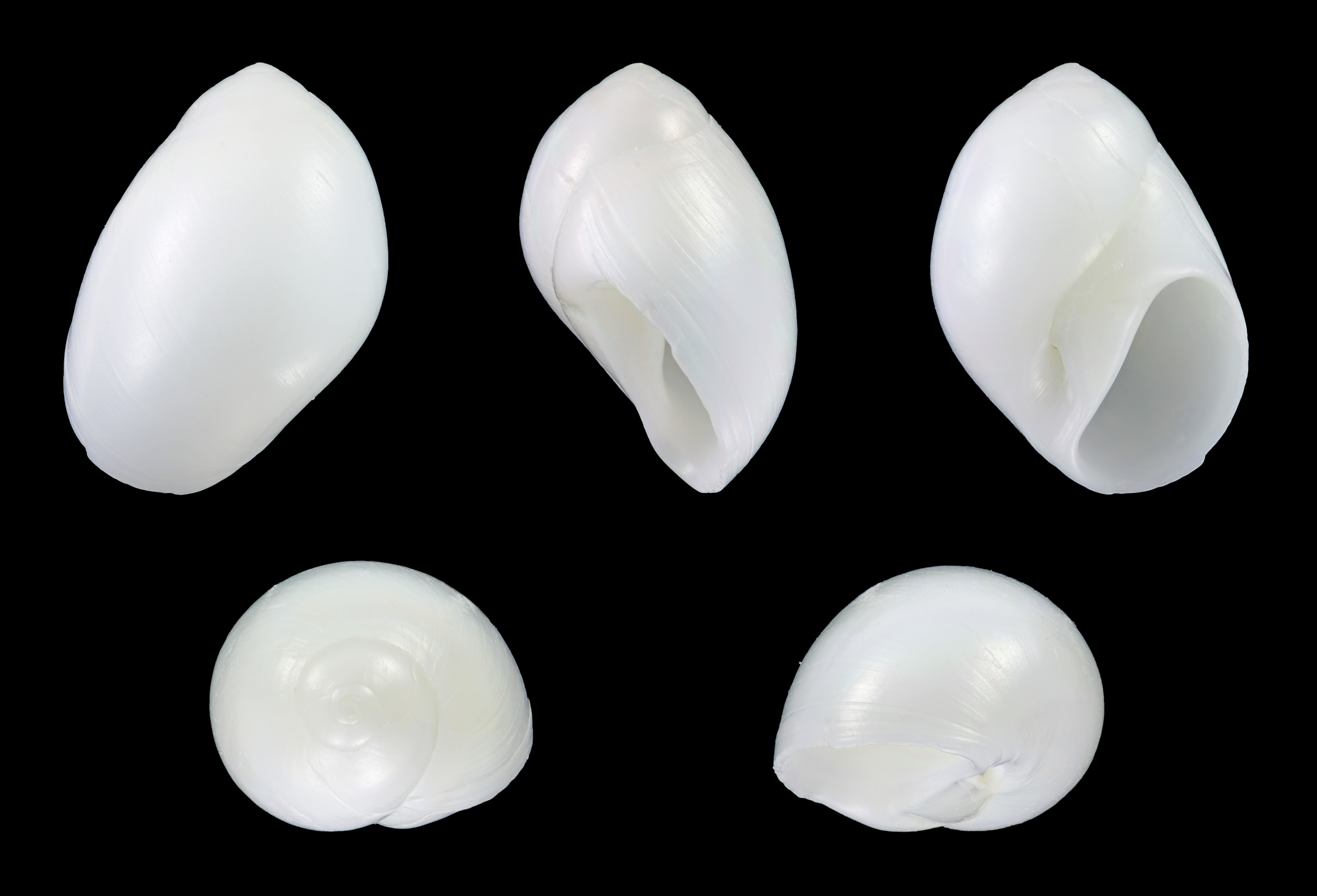
- Polinices lacteus shell

Scientific classification
- Kingdom: Animalia
- Phylum: Mollusca
- Class: Gastropoda
- Subclass: Caenogastropoda
- Order: Littorinimorpha
- Family: Naticidae
- Genus: Polinices
- Species: P. lacteus

Binomial name
- Polinices lacteus (Guilding, 1834)

Synonyms
- Natica candidissima Récluz, 1851; Natica caribaea Philippi, 1851; Natica lactea (Guilding, 1834); Natica ochrostoma Récluz, 1850; Natica pfeifferi Philippi, 1851; Natica porcelana d'Orbigny, 1840; Natica puella Philippi, 1852; Natica rodatzii Philippi, 1851 (junior synonym); Natica sanctivincentii Brooks, 1933; Naticina lactea Guilding, 1834 (original combination); Polinices porcelanus (d'Orbigny, 1840); Polynices lacteus (Guilding, 1834)

= Polinices lacteus =

Species of gastropod

Polinices lacteus is a species of predatory sea snail, a marine gastropod mollusk in the family Naticidae, the moon snails.

== Distribution ==
Polinices lacteus specimens have been found throughout the southern Atlantic coastlines. This includes the Caribbean Sea, the Canary Islands, the Angolan coast, and the Cape Verde island chain. The species has also been spotted along almost the entire South American coast and in the Gulf of Mexico.

== Description ==
The maximum recorded shell length is 40 mm. Operculum is thin, horny, yellow or amber-red. (R.Tucker Abbott -1968- "Seashells of North America") Periostracum is thin, yellowish.

== Habitat ==
The minimum recorded depth for this species is 0 m; maximum recorded depth is 120 m.
