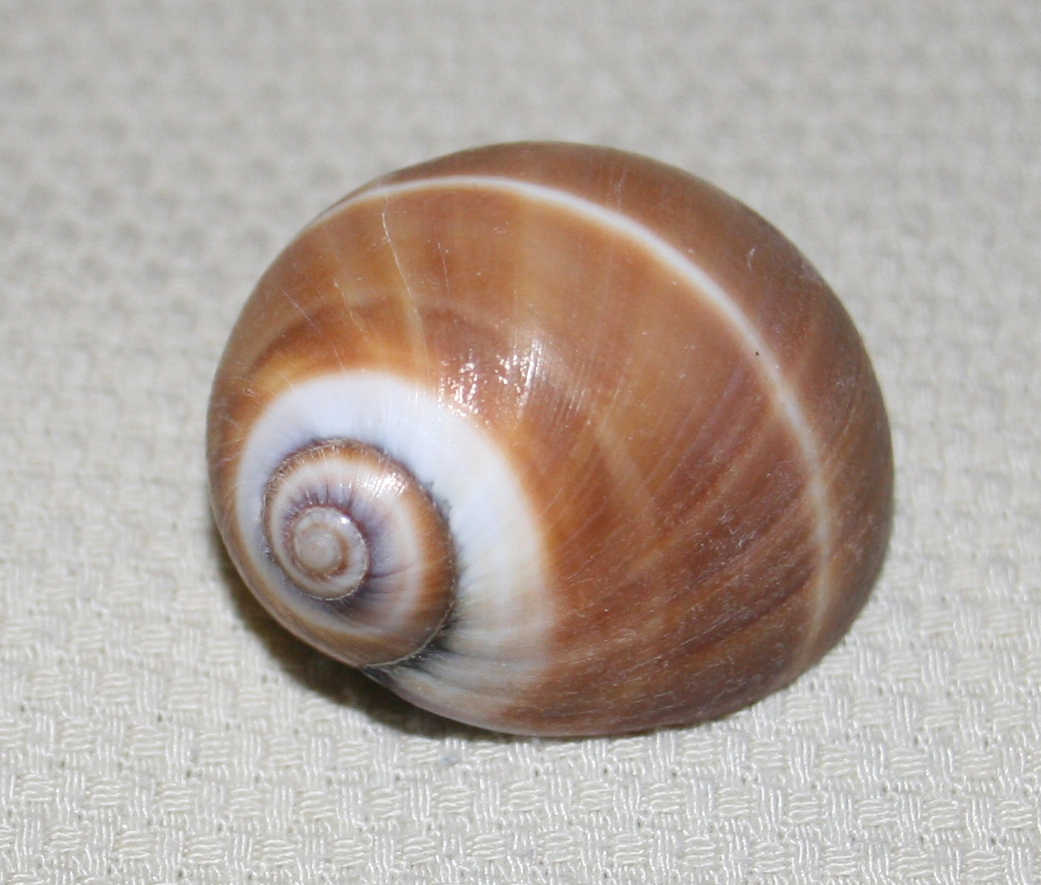

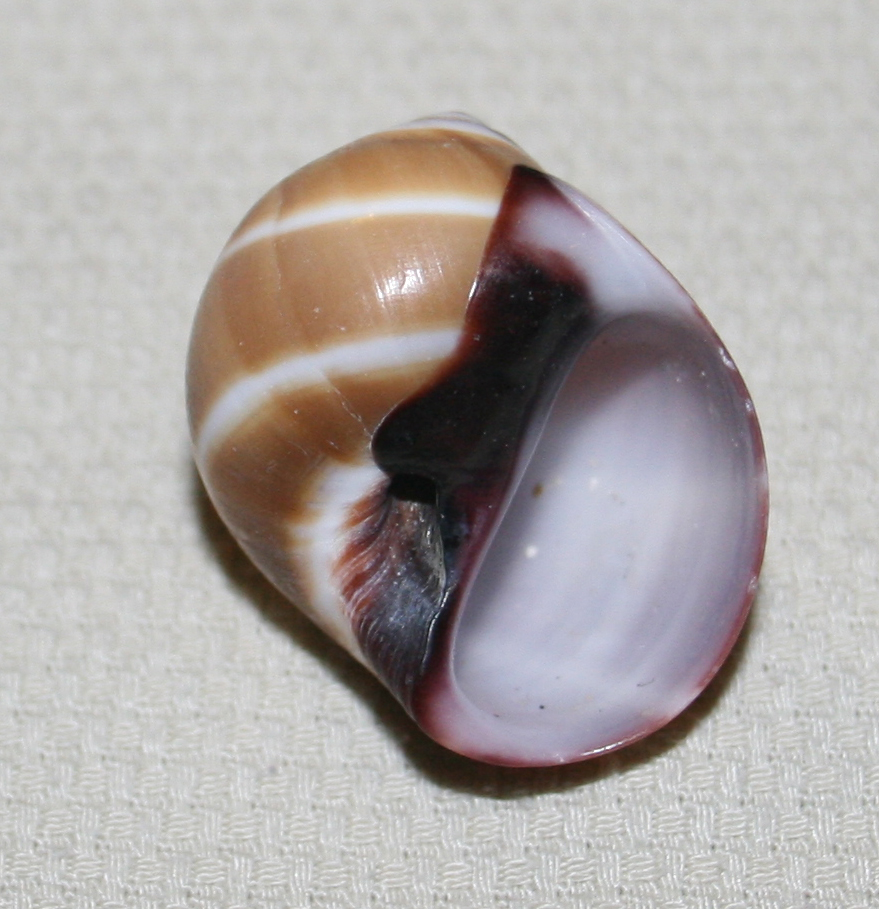
- Showing aperture

Scientific classification
- Kingdom: Animalia
- Phylum: Mollusca
- Class: Gastropoda
- Subclass: Caenogastropoda
- Order: Littorinimorpha
- Family: Naticidae
- Genus: Polinices
- Species: P. bifasciatus

Binomial name
- Polinices bifasciatus (Gray in Griffith & Pidgeon, 1833)

Synonyms
- Natica bifasciatus Gray in Griffith & Pidgeon, 1833

= Polinices bifasciatus =

Species of gastropod

Polinices bifasciatus, or two-banded moon snail, is a species of gastropod mollusc. The animal was first described to science in a work authored by English biologists Edward Griffith and Edward Pidgeon. This was a multi-volume translation of George Cuvier's, Le Règne Animal (1830). The Griffith and Pidgeon work went beyond translation and added a supplement that included the description of Polinices bifasciatus. The description of Polinices bifasciatus is attributed to John Edward Gray. It reads, in its entirety, "Pale brown, with two narrow bands".

== Description ==
The shell is smooth. The exterior is tan or light brown with two widely separated, narrow white bands. There are about four whorls and a low spire. The shell has a large aperture. The shell is a darker brown at the inside edge of the aperture. The interior is white. The shell reaches a height of 40 mm (1.6 inches) and a diameter of 26 mm (1 inch). The operculum is brown.

== Distribution ==
This moon snail is found from in the eastern Pacific Ocean from the Gulf of California to Panama. It has not been documented on the west coast of the Baja Peninsula. It is a shallow water species found in the intertidal zone to 3 meters (10 feet) deep on sand and mud flats.

== Life history ==
Like most of the moon snails, Polinices bifasciatus produces a sand collar to lay its eggs during breeding season.

This moon snail preys on small bivalves. It is actively mobile, hunting on soft seabeds for buried clams. It uses an abrasive appendage called a radula to drill into the shells of small clams. Once inside, it secretes digestive fluids and then feeds on the clam slurry that results.
