= Glossaulax petiveriana =

Scientific classification
- Kingdom: Animalia
- Phylum: Mollusca
- Class: Gastropoda
- Subclass: Caenogastropoda
- Order: Littorinimorpha
- Family: Naticidae
- Genus: Glossaulax
- Species: G. petiveriana

Binomial name
- Glossaulax petiveriana (Récluz, 1843)

Species of gastropod

Glossaulax petiveriana is a species of sea snail, a marine gastropod mollusk in the family Naticidae, the moon snails. The scientific name of this species was first published in 1843 by César Auguste Récluz.
