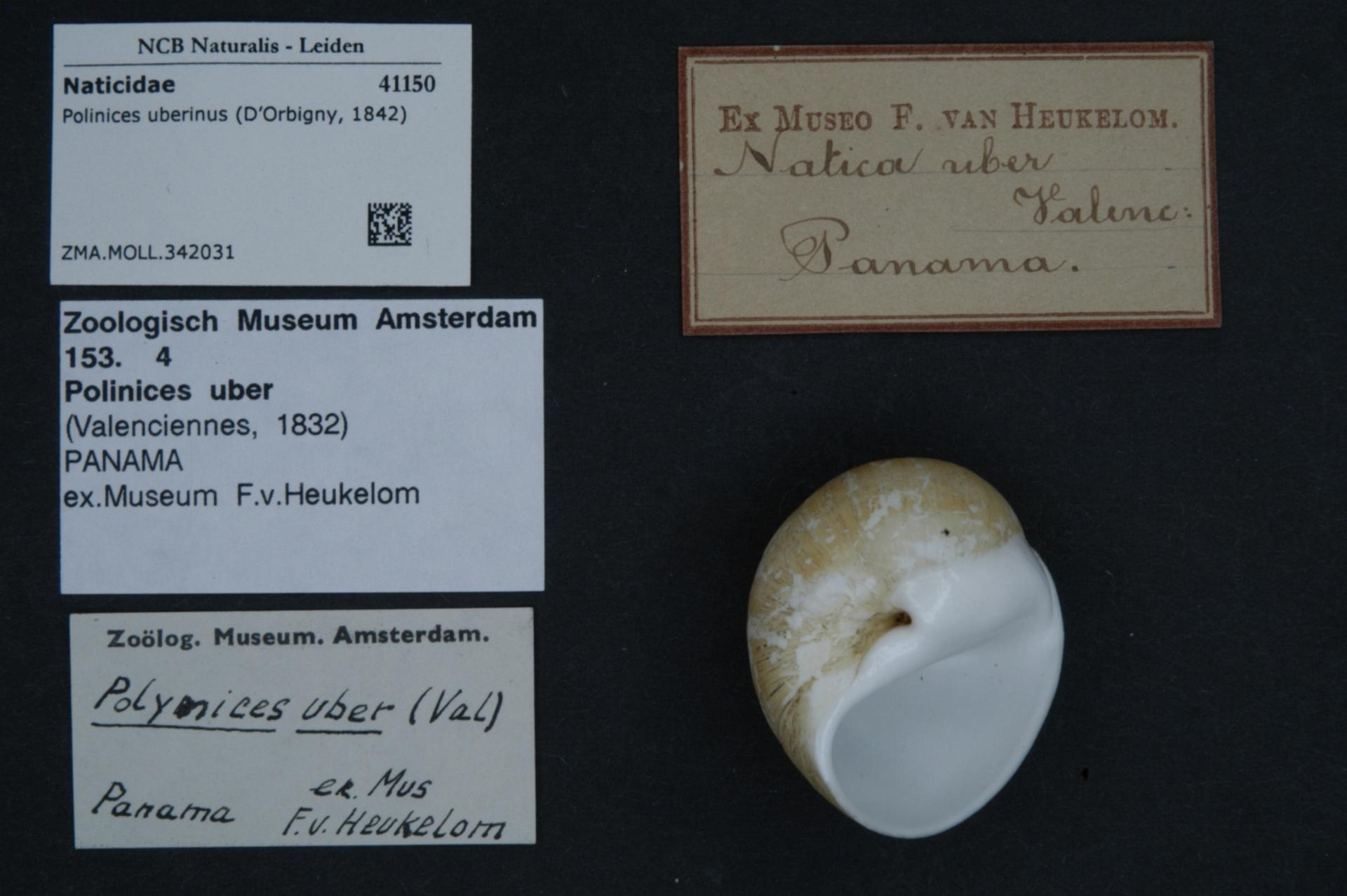
- Polinices uberinus

Scientific classification
- Kingdom: Animalia
- Phylum: Mollusca
- Class: Gastropoda
- Subclass: Caenogastropoda
- Order: Littorinimorpha
- Family: Naticidae
- Genus: Polinices
- Species: P. uberinus

Binomial name
- Polinices uberinus (d’Orbigny, 1842)

= Polinices uberinus =

Species of gastropod

Polinices uberinus, common name the "white moon snail" or "dwarf white moon snail", is a species of small predatory sea snail. It is a marine gastropod mollusk in the family Naticidae, the moon snails.

== Description ==
The maximum recorded shell length of P. uberinus is 20 mm (0.79 in).

== Habitat ==
The minimum recorded depth for this species is 27 m (89 ft); the maximum recorded depth is 183 m (600 ft).
