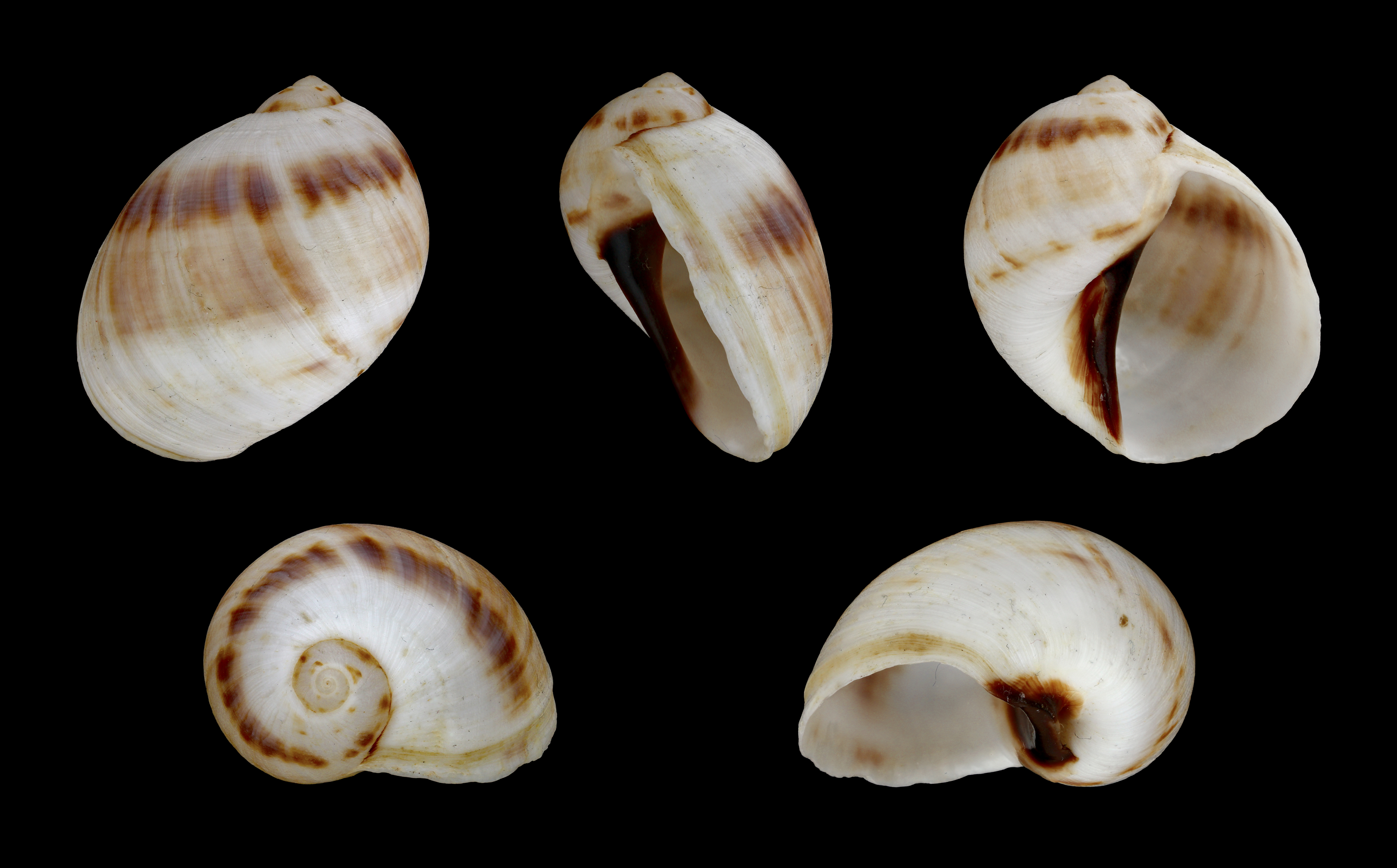
- Five views of a shell of Mammilla sebae

Scientific classification
- Kingdom: Animalia
- Phylum: Mollusca
- Class: Gastropoda
- Subclass: Caenogastropoda
- Order: Littorinimorpha
- Family: Naticidae
- Genus: Mammilla; Schumacher, 1817

Type species
- Mammilla fasciata Schumacher, 1817

Synonyms
- Mamilla (incorrect spelling of generic name); Naticaria Swainson, 1840; Polinices (Mammilla) Schumacher, 1817; Ruma Gray, 1847

= Mammilla (gastropod) =

Genus of gastropods

Mammilla is a genus of predatory sea snails, marine gastropod mollusks in the subfamily Polinicinae of the family Naticidae, the moon snails.

== Species ==
Species within the genus Mamilla include:

- Mammilla caprae (Philippi, 1852)
- Mammilla fibrosa (Gray, 1850)
- Mammilla kurodai (Iw. Taki, 1944)
- Mammilla mammata (Röding, 1798)
- Mammilla maura (Lamarck, 1816)
- Mammilla melanostoma (Gmelin, 1791)
- Mammilla melanostomoides (Quoy & Gaimard, 1832)
- Mammilla mikawaensis Azuma, 1961
- Mammilla priamus (Récluz, 1844)
- Mammilla sebae (Récluz, 1844)
- Mammilla simiae (Deshayes, 1848)
- Mammilla syrphetodes (Kilburn, 1976)

Species brought into synonymy

- Mammilla fasciata Schumacher, 1817: synonym of Mammilla mammata (Röding, 1798)
- Mammilla plumatilis Iredale, 1936: synonym of Mammilla fibrosa (Gray, 1850)
- Mammilla propesimiae Iredale, 1929: synonym of Mammilla simiae (Deshayes, 1838)

Further investigation needed

- Mammilla bernardii (Récluz, 1851) (species inquirenda)
