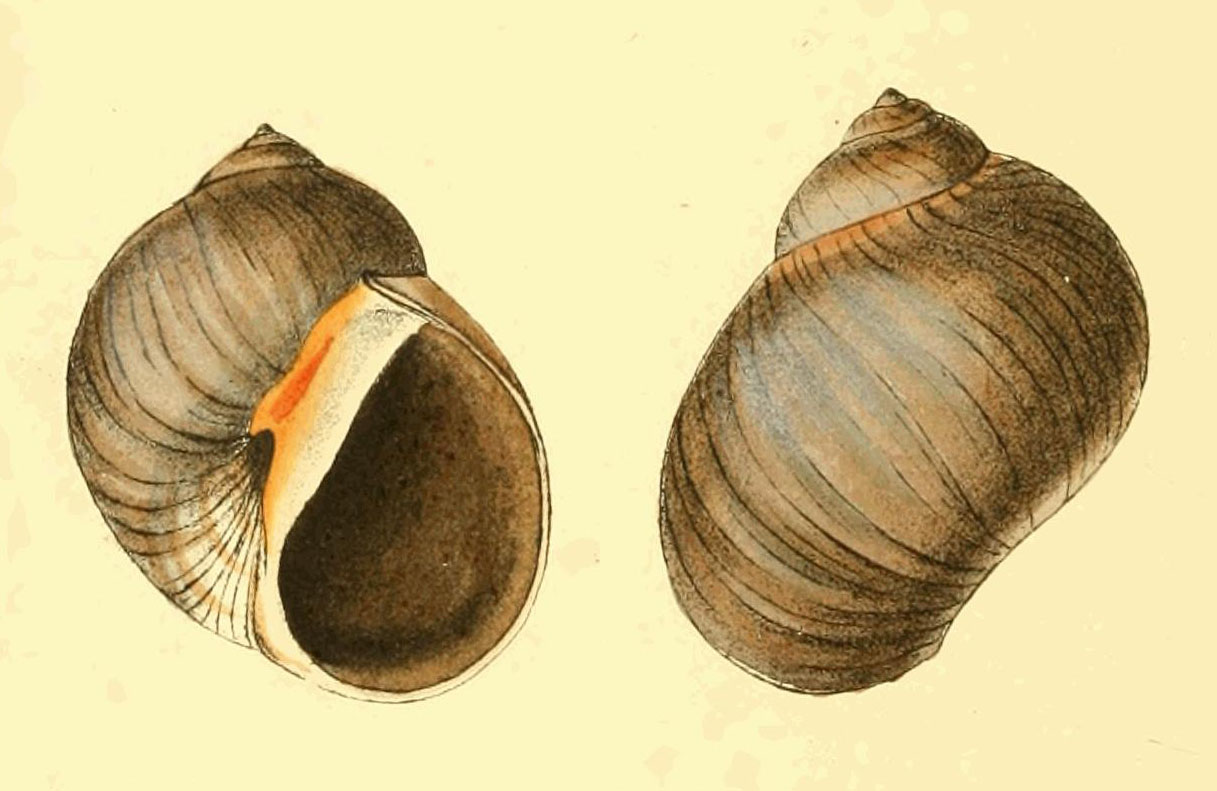
- Drawing of shells of Conuber sordidum.

Scientific classification
- Kingdom: Animalia
- Phylum: Mollusca
- Class: Gastropoda
- Subclass: Caenogastropoda
- Order: Littorinimorpha
- Superfamily: Naticoidea
- Family: Naticidae
- Genus: Conuber; Finlay & Marwick, 1937

Type species
- Natica conica Lamarck, 1822

= Conuber =

Genus of gastropods

Conuber is a genus of predatory sea snails, marine gastropod mollusks in the family Naticidae, the moon snails.

== Species ==
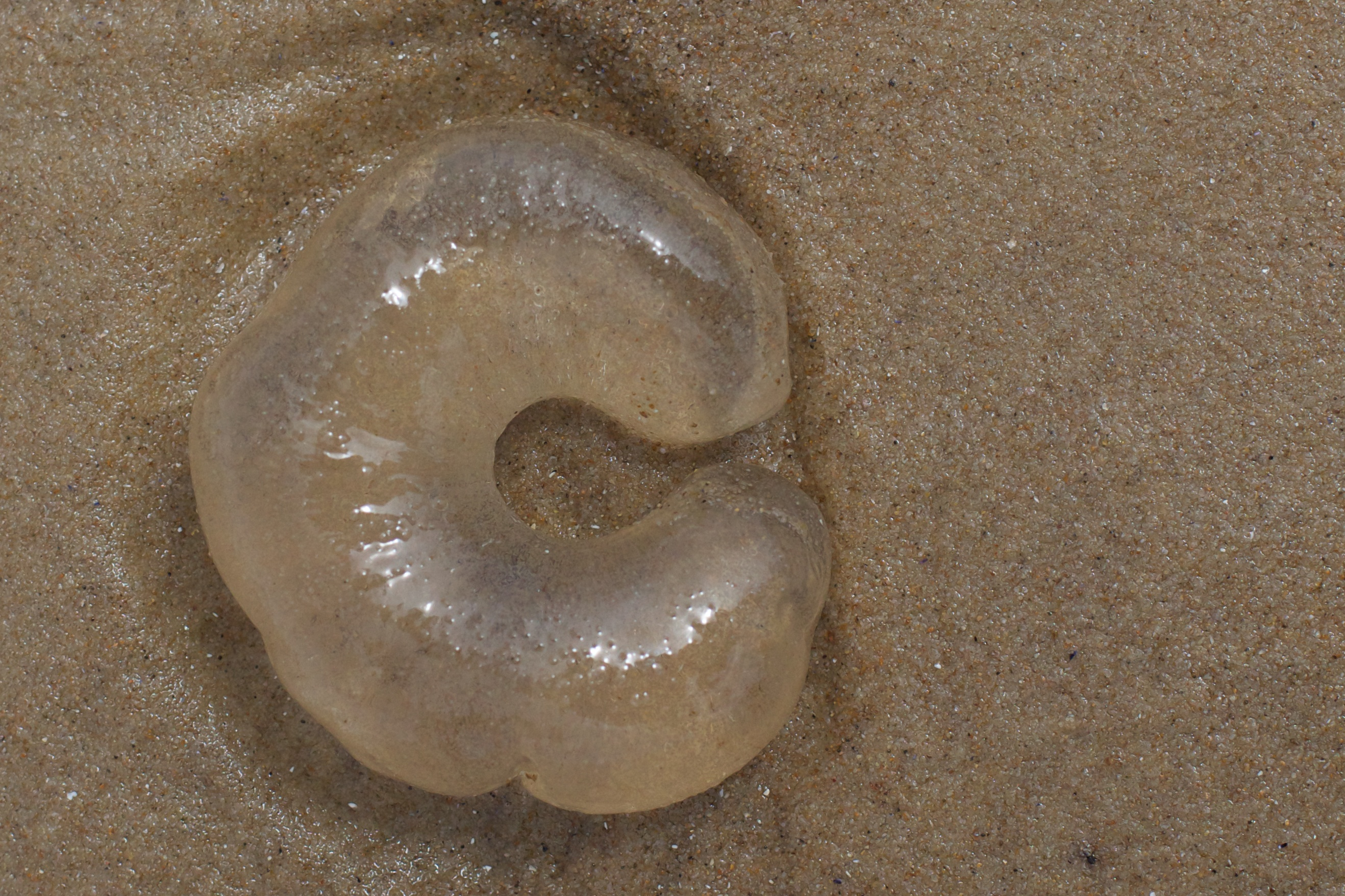
Females of Conuber conicum lay C-shaped eggs in a stiff jelly. They are often mistaken for jellyfish.

Species within the genus Conuber include:

- Conuber conicum (Lamarck, 1822) - Conical Moon Snail.
- Conuber incei (Philippi, 1835)
- Conuber melastoma (Swainson, 1821)
- Conuber sordidum (Swainson, 1821)
