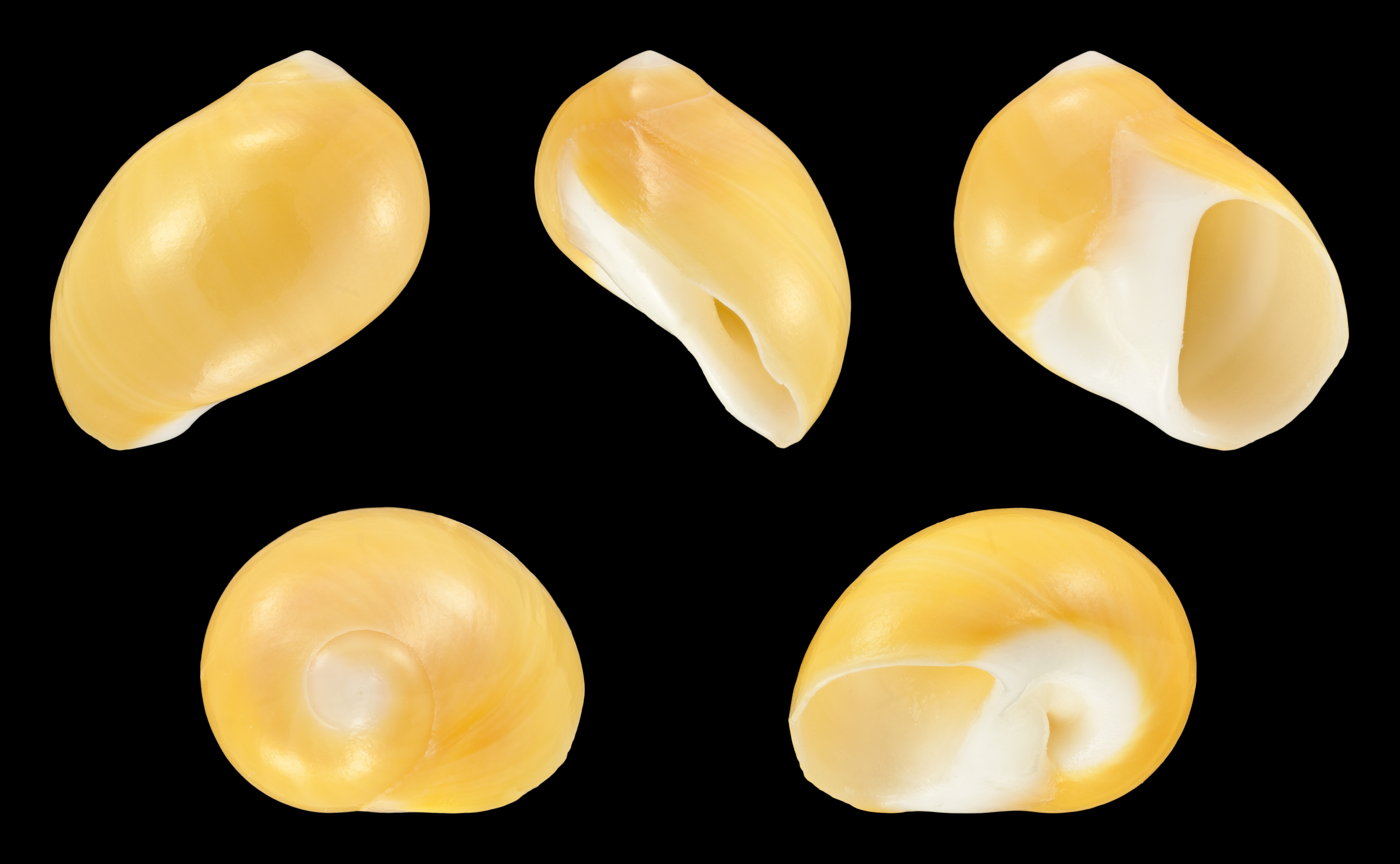

Scientific classification
- Kingdom: Animalia
- Phylum: Mollusca
- Class: Gastropoda
- Subclass: Caenogastropoda
- Order: Littorinimorpha
- Family: Naticidae
- Genus: Polinices
- Species: P. aurantius

Binomial name
- Polinices aurantius (Röding, 1798)

Synonyms
- Albula aurantium Röding, 1798 (basionym); Natica aurantia (Röding, 1798); Natica straminea Récluz, 1844; Natica sulphurea Récluz, 1844

= Polinices aurantius =

Species of gastropod

Polinices aurantius is a species of predatory sea snail, a marine gastropod mollusk in the family Naticidae, the moon snails.

== Distribution ==
This species occurs in the Indian Ocean off Madagascar.
