= Polinices mammilla =

- Polinices mammilla shell

Scientific classification
- Kingdom: Animalia
- Phylum: Mollusca
- Class: Gastropoda
- Subclass: Caenogastropoda
- Order: Littorinimorpha
- Family: Naticidae
- Genus: Polinices
- Species: P. mammilla

Binomial name
- Polinices mammilla (Linnaeus, 1758)

Synonyms
- Mamillaria tumida Swainson, 1840; Natica albula Récluz, 1851; Natica cygnea Philippi, 1852; Natica intermedia Récluz, 1843 (non Deshayes, 1832 nec Philippi, 1836); Natica ponderosa Philippi, 1852; Natica pyriformis Récluz, 1844; Nerita mammilla Linnaeus, 1758 (basionym); Polinices albus Montfort, 1810; Polinices pyriformis (Récluz, 1844)

Species of gastropod

Polinices mammilla is a species of predatory sea snail, a marine gastropod mollusk in the family Naticidae, the moon snails.

== Description ==
Pure white shells, rather elongated in shape, up to 4 cm; chestnut-brown, horny operculum.

== Distribution ==
This species occurs in the Red Sea and in the Indian Ocean off Kenya, Madagascar, Mauritius, Tanzania, Transkei and is also found in the Central Indo-Pacific Ocean and in the west Pacific Ocean off Papua New Guinea and Australia.
