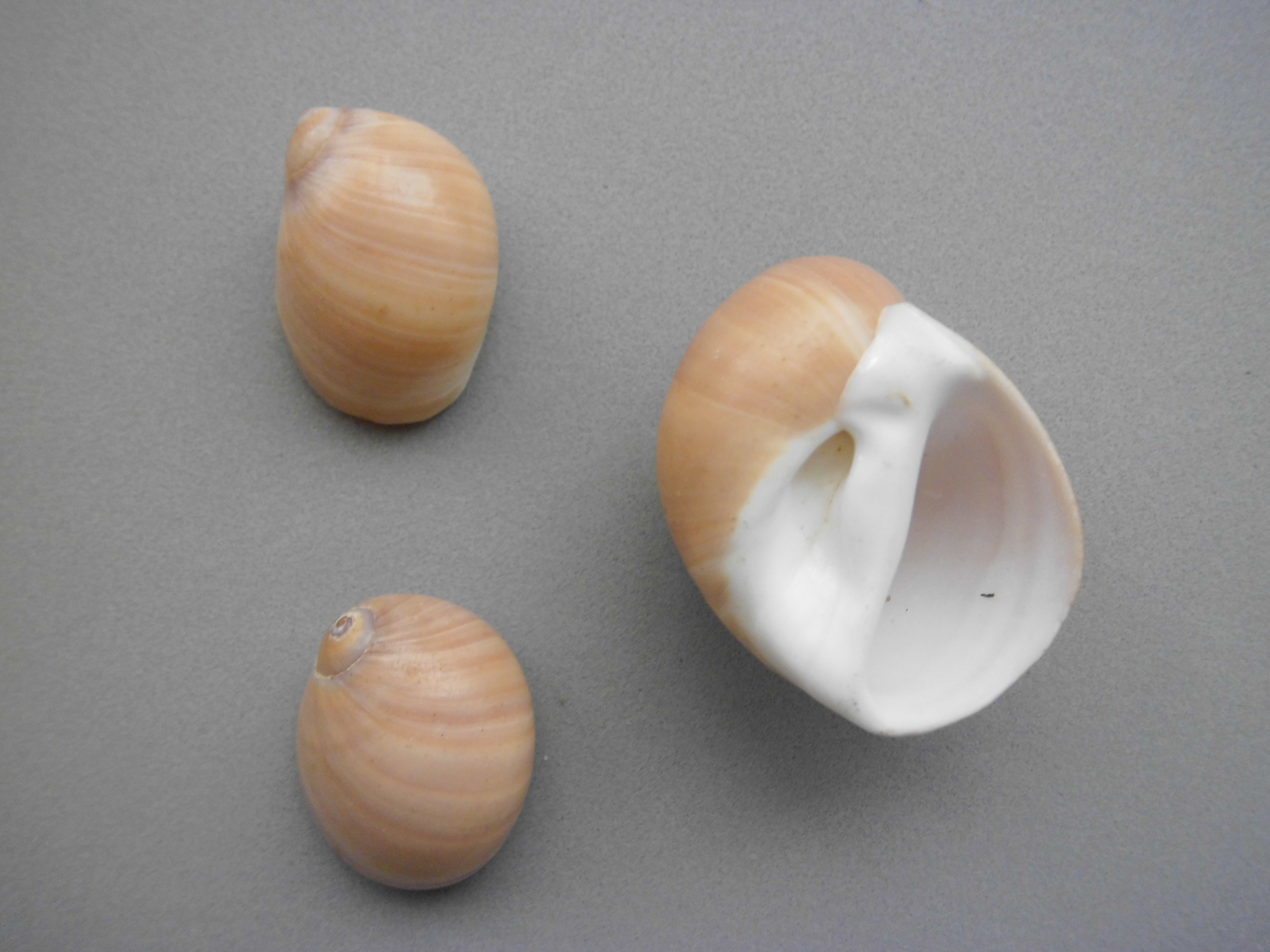

Scientific classification
- Kingdom: Animalia
- Phylum: Mollusca
- Class: Gastropoda
- Subclass: Caenogastropoda
- Order: Littorinimorpha
- Family: Naticidae
- Genus: Polinices
- Species: P. hepaticus

Binomial name
- Polinices hepaticus (Röding, 1798)

= Polinices hepaticus =

Species of gastropod

Polinices hepaticus is a species of predatory sea snail, a marine gastropod mollusk in the family Naticidae, the moon snails.

== Description ==
The maximum recorded shell length is 51 mm.

== Habitat ==
The minimum recorded depth for this species is 0 m.; the maximum recorded depth is 55 m.
