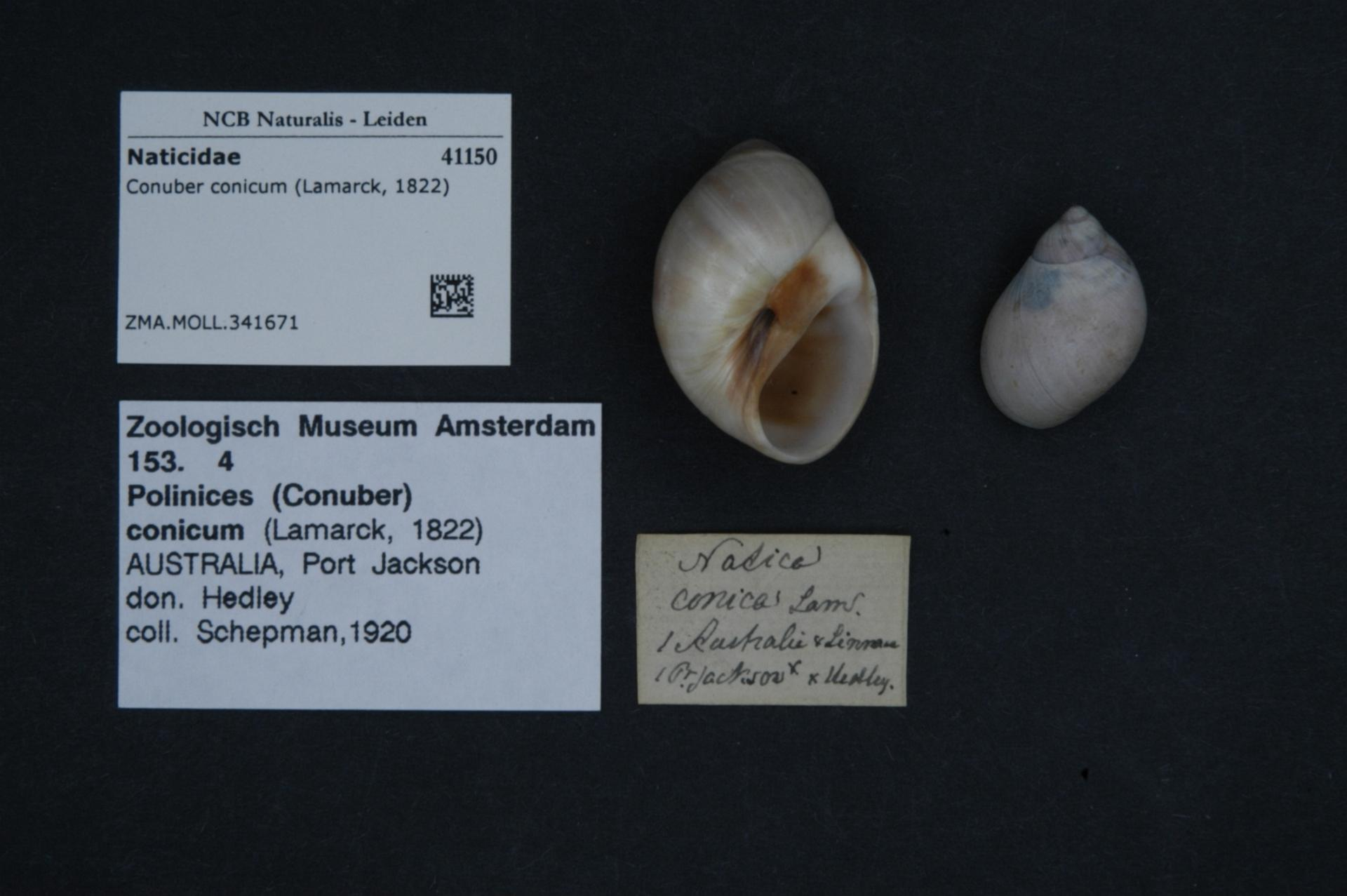

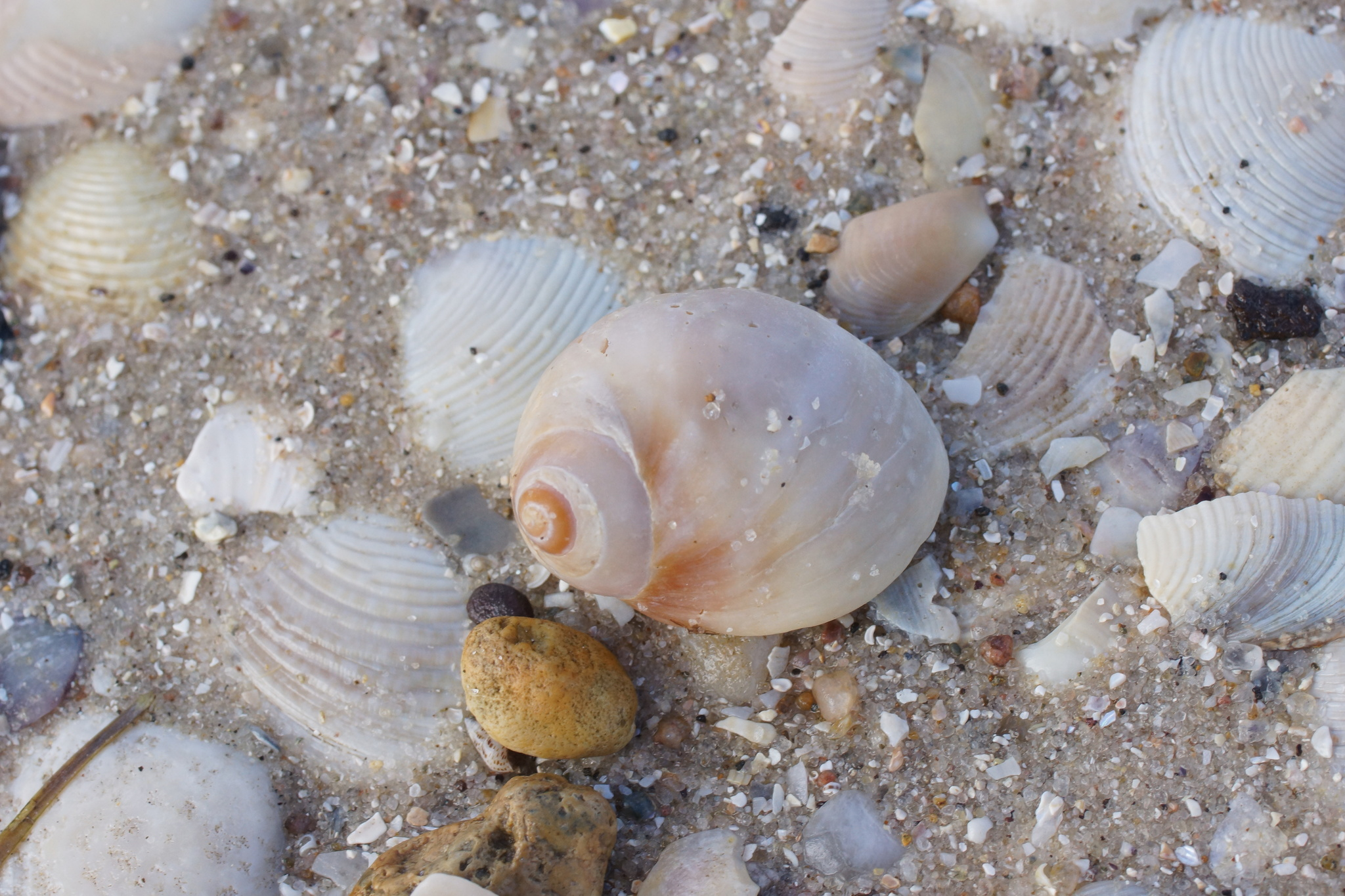

Scientific classification
- Kingdom: Animalia
- Phylum: Mollusca
- Class: Gastropoda
- Subclass: Caenogastropoda
- Order: Littorinimorpha
- Family: Naticidae
- Genus: Conuber
- Species: C. conicum

Binomial name
- Conuber conicum (Lamarck, 1822)

Synonyms
- Natica conica Lamarck, 1822; Natica pyramis Reeve, 1855; Natica tasmanica Tenison Woods, 1876; Natica ustulata G. B. Sowerby II, 1883; Polinices conicus (Lamarck, 1822); Sigaretus acuminatus A. Adams & Reeve, 1850

= Conuber conicum =

Species of gastropod

Conuber conicum, the conical moon snail, is a species of predatory sea snail, in the family Naticidae, the moon snails. It was first described in 1822 as Natica conica by Jean-Baptiste Lamarck.

== Description ==
The length of the shell attains 10 mm, its diameter 6 mm.

(Described as Natica tasmanica) The shell has a somewhat covered umbilicus. It is depressedly orbicular, thick, with a short but slightly exsert spire. The whorls are convex, rounded, smooth, or obliquely thickly and most minutely striate. The aperture is semilunar and horizontal. The columella is somewhat thin, with a prominent callosity, which is spirally sulcate. The umbilicus is angularly excavate; with a kind of callosity within the suture at the aperture. The shell is pale fulvous or whitish, banded with brownish or orange lines. The base of the shell is white, chestnut or fulvous within.

== Distribution ==
This species is endemic to Australia (New South Wales, Queensland, South Australia, Tasmania, Victoria, Western Australia). It is a carnivorous marine snail found on intertidal sand flats, all around Australia. It feeds on small bivalves.
