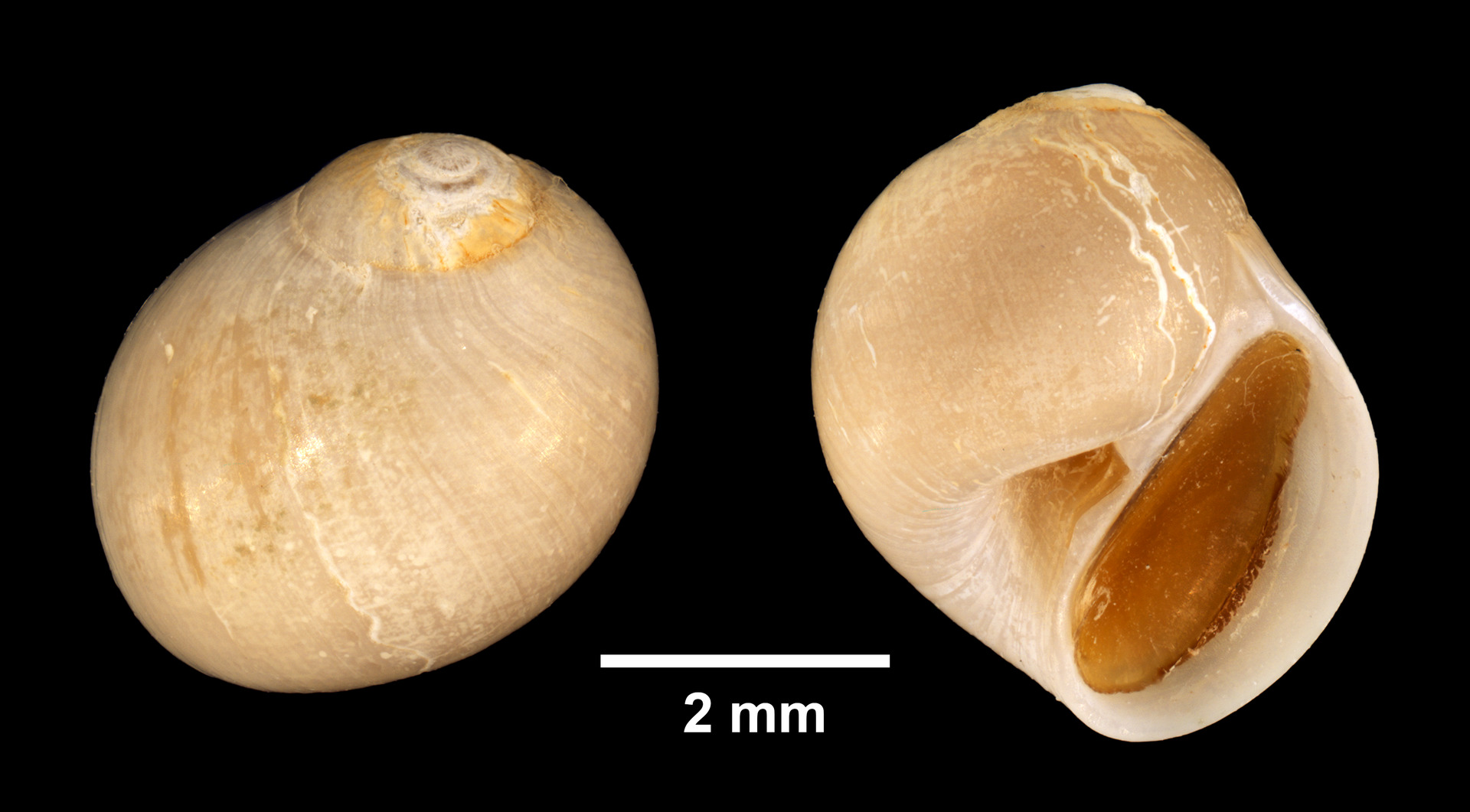

Scientific classification
- Kingdom: Animalia
- Phylum: Mollusca
- Class: Gastropoda
- Subclass: Caenogastropoda
- Order: Littorinimorpha
- Family: Naticidae
- Genus: Polinices
- Species: P. immaculatus

Binomial name
- Polinices immaculatus (Totten, 1835)

Synonyms
- Euspira immaculata (Totten, 1835); Natica immaculata Totten, 1835 (basionym)

= Polinices immaculatus =

Species of gastropod

Polinices immaculatus, common name the immaculate moonsnail, is a species of predatory sea snail, a marine gastropod mollusk in the family Naticidae, the moon snails.

== Distribution ==
This species occurs in the Northwest Atlantic Ocean.

== Description ==
The maximum recorded shell length is 10 mm.

== Habitat ==
Minimum recorded depth is 9 m. Maximum recorded depth is 201 m.
