= Polinices leptaleus =

Scientific classification
- Kingdom: Animalia
- Phylum: Mollusca
- Class: Gastropoda
- Subclass: Caenogastropoda
- Order: Littorinimorpha
- Family: Naticidae
- Genus: Polinices
- Species: P. leptaleus

Binomial name
- Polinices leptaleus (Watson, 1881)

Species of gastropod

Polinices leptaleus is a species of predatory sea snail, a marine gastropod mollusk in the family Naticidae, the moon snails.

== Description ==
The maximum recorded shell length is 8.9 mm.

== Habitat ==
Minimum recorded depth is 538 m. Maximum recorded depth is 1170 m.
