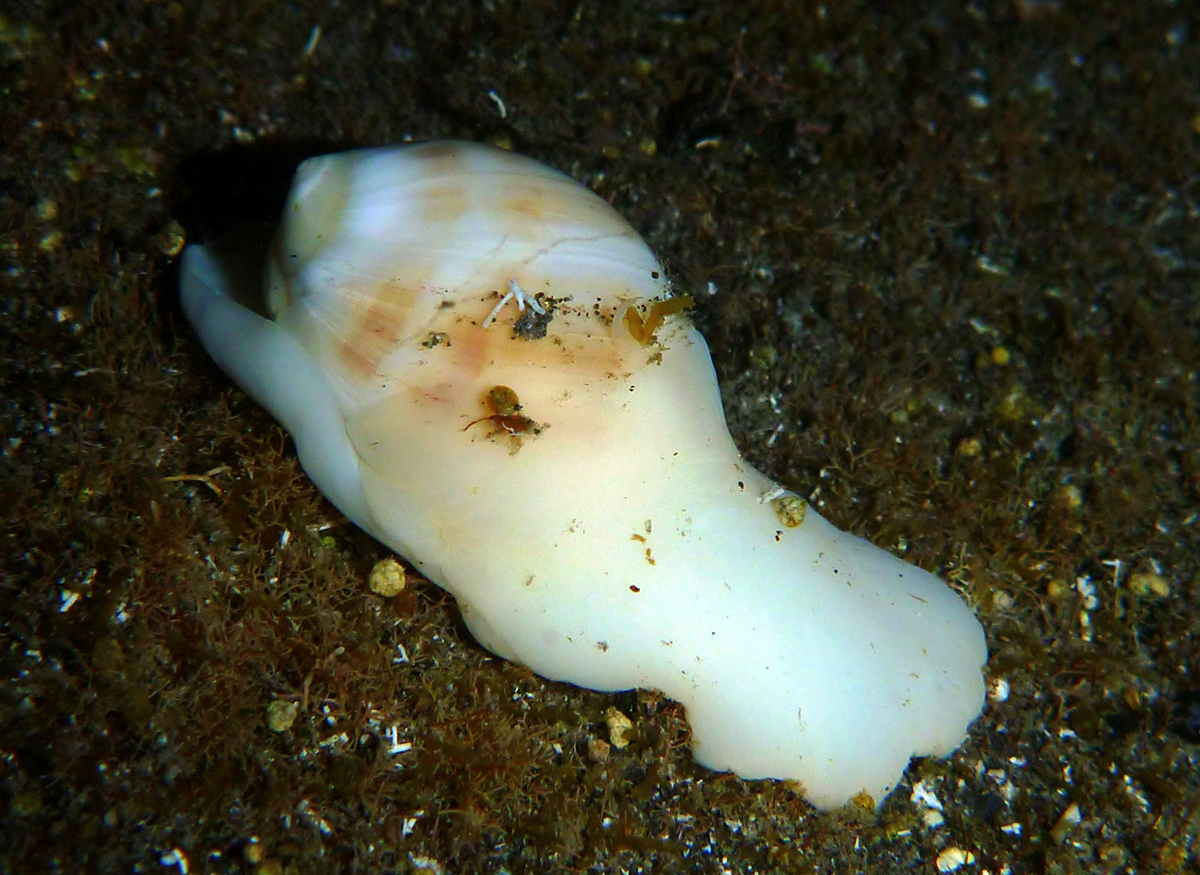

Scientific classification
- Kingdom: Animalia
- Phylum: Mollusca
- Class: Gastropoda
- Subclass: Caenogastropoda
- Order: Littorinimorpha
- Family: Naticidae
- Genus: Mammilla
- Species: M. melanostoma

Binomial name
- Mammilla melanostoma (Gmelin, 1791)

Synonyms
- Mamilla melanostoma (Gmelin, 1791) (wrong spelling); Natica melanochila Philippi, 1852; Natica melanostoma (Gmelin, 1791); Natica opaca Récluz, 1851; Natica succineoides Reeve, 1855; Nerita melanostoma Gmelin, 1791 (basionym); Polinices melanostoma Gmelin, 1791; Polinices opaca [sic] (incorrect gender ending); Polynices opacus (Récluz, 1851)

= Mammilla melanostoma =

Species of gastropod

Mammilla melanostoma is a species of predatory sea snail, a marine gastropod mollusk in the family Naticidae, the moon snails.

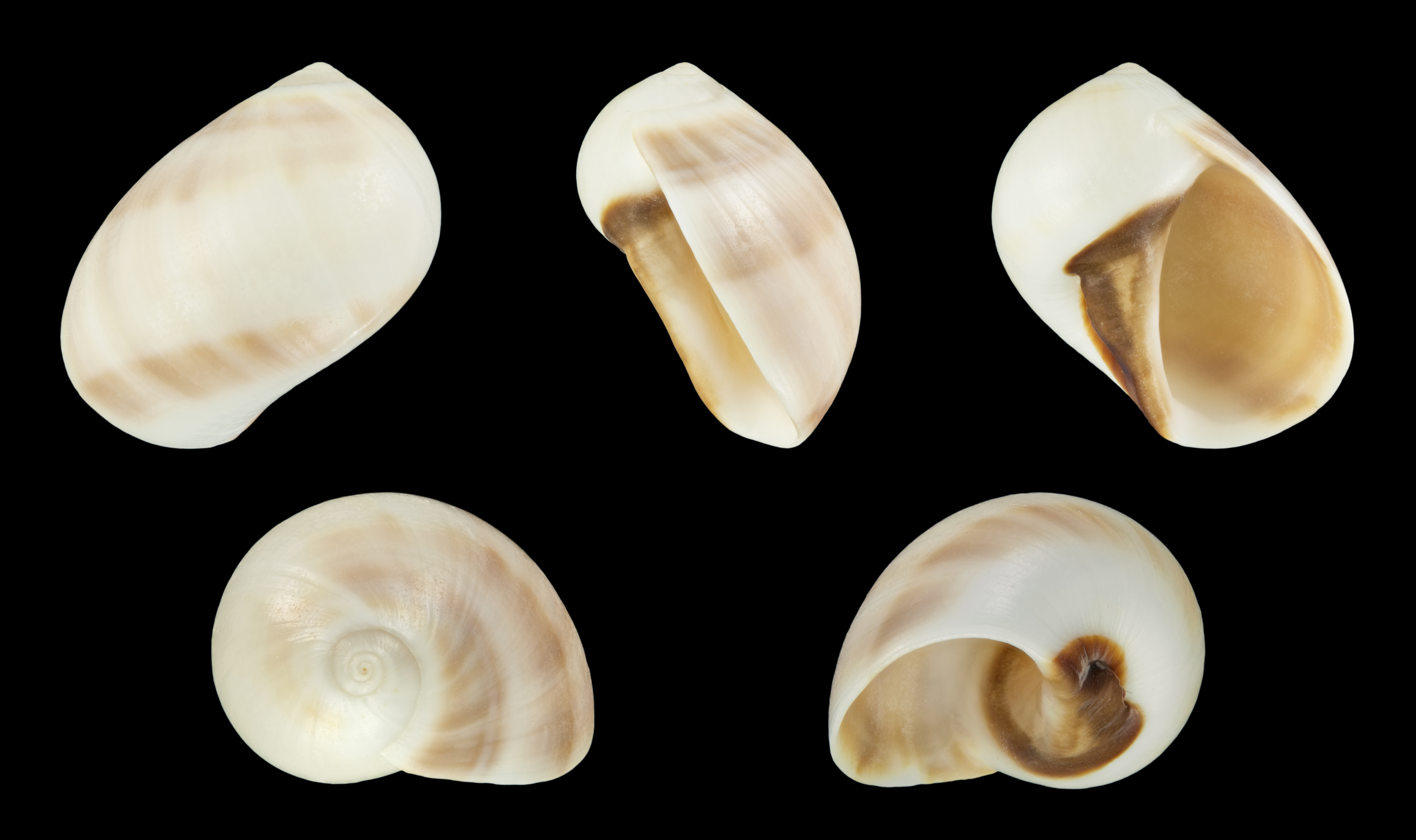
Shell

== Distribution ==
This marine species occurs from South Africa to Japan.
