= Mammilla simiae =

Scientific classification
- Kingdom: Animalia
- Phylum: Mollusca
- Class: Gastropoda
- Subclass: Caenogastropoda
- Order: Littorinimorpha
- Family: Naticidae
- Genus: Mammilla
- Species: M. simiae

Binomial name
- Mammilla simiae (Deshayes, 1838)

Synonyms
- Mamilla simiae (Deshayes, 1848); Mammilla propesimiae Iredale, 1929; Natica samarensis Récluz, 1844; Natica sigaretina Menke, 1828 (Invalid: junior homonym of Natica sigaretina J. Sowerby, 1824); Natica simiae Deshayes, 1838 (basionym); Polinices simiae Deshayes

Species of gastropod

Mammilla simiae is a species of predatory sea snail, a marine gastropod mollusk in the family Naticidae, the moon snails.

== Distribution ==
This species occurs in the Indian Ocean off Madagascar, Aldabra and the Mascarene Basin.
