= Umbilicus (mollusc) =

Feature of gastropod, Nautilus and Ammonite shell anatomy

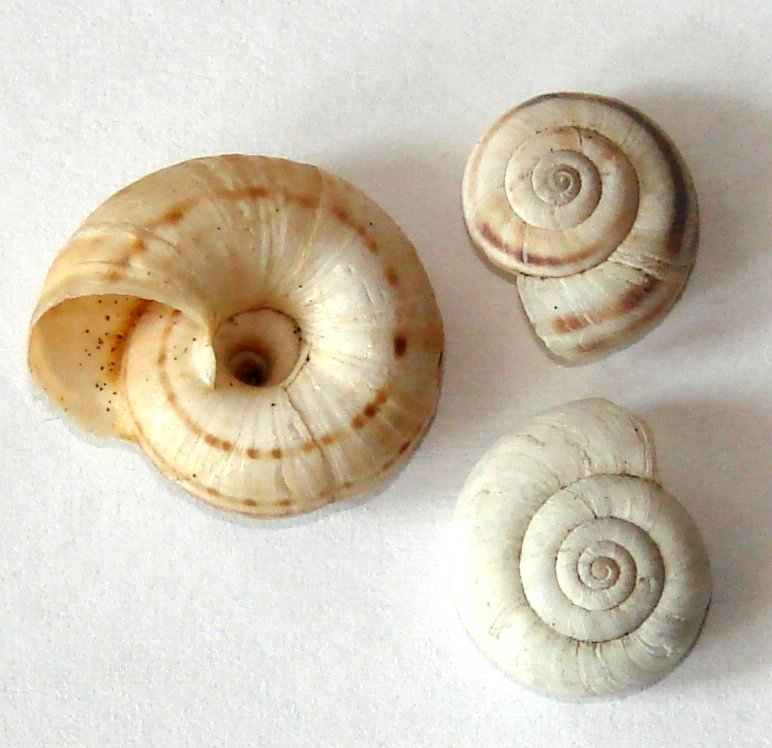
The umbilicus is clearly visible on the underside of the left shell of these three shells of Xerolenta obvia

The umbilicus of a coiled mollusc shell is the axially aligned, hollow cone-shaped space within its whorls. The term umbilicus is often used in descriptions of gastropod shells, i.e. it is a feature present on the ventral (or under) side of many (but not all) snail shells, including some species of sea snails, land snails, and freshwater snails.

The word is also applied to the depressed central area on the planispiral coiled shells of Nautilus species and fossil ammonites. (These are not gastropods, but shelled cephalopods.)

== In gastropods ==
The spirally coiled whorls of gastropod shells frequently connect to each other by their inner sides, during the natural course of its formation. This results in a more or less solid central axial pillar, known as the columella. The more intimate the contact between the concave side of the whorls is, the more solid the columella becomes. On the other hand, if this connection is less intense, a hollow space inside the whorls may result, with an opening to the outside at the shell's base. This opening is known as the umbilicus.

Another way of characterizing the umbilicus in gastropods is as the hole around which the inner surface of the shell is coiled, when that space is not filled by a columella. In species with a wide, open umbilicus, such as the heath snail (Helicella itala), the spiral of the whorls can be clearly viewed by looking into the umbilicus.

An umbilicus can vary from very narrow and punctured, as found in Petasina unidentata, to wide and shallow, such as the deep and wide depression in the rounded snail (Discus rotundatus). Shells with a conspicuous umbilicus are always orthostylic, i.e. they have a poorly developed columella.

Sometimes there is a dimple or funnel-shaped depression, known as the umbilical region or the umbilical field, next to or at the basal hollow of the columella, when the walls of successive whorls are not closely wound against each other.

A funicle is a cord-like spiral ridge within the umbilical area of the shell that runs into or partly fills the umbilicus. It usually appears as a raised, rounded spiral thickening that can either remain exposed in the umbilicus or be partly to largely covered by parietal callus in adult shells, and it is often used as a diagnostic feature such as the subfamily Naticinae, the moon snails.

A phaneromphalous shell has an open umbilicus. A cryptomphalous shell has the opening of the umbilicus completely plugged.

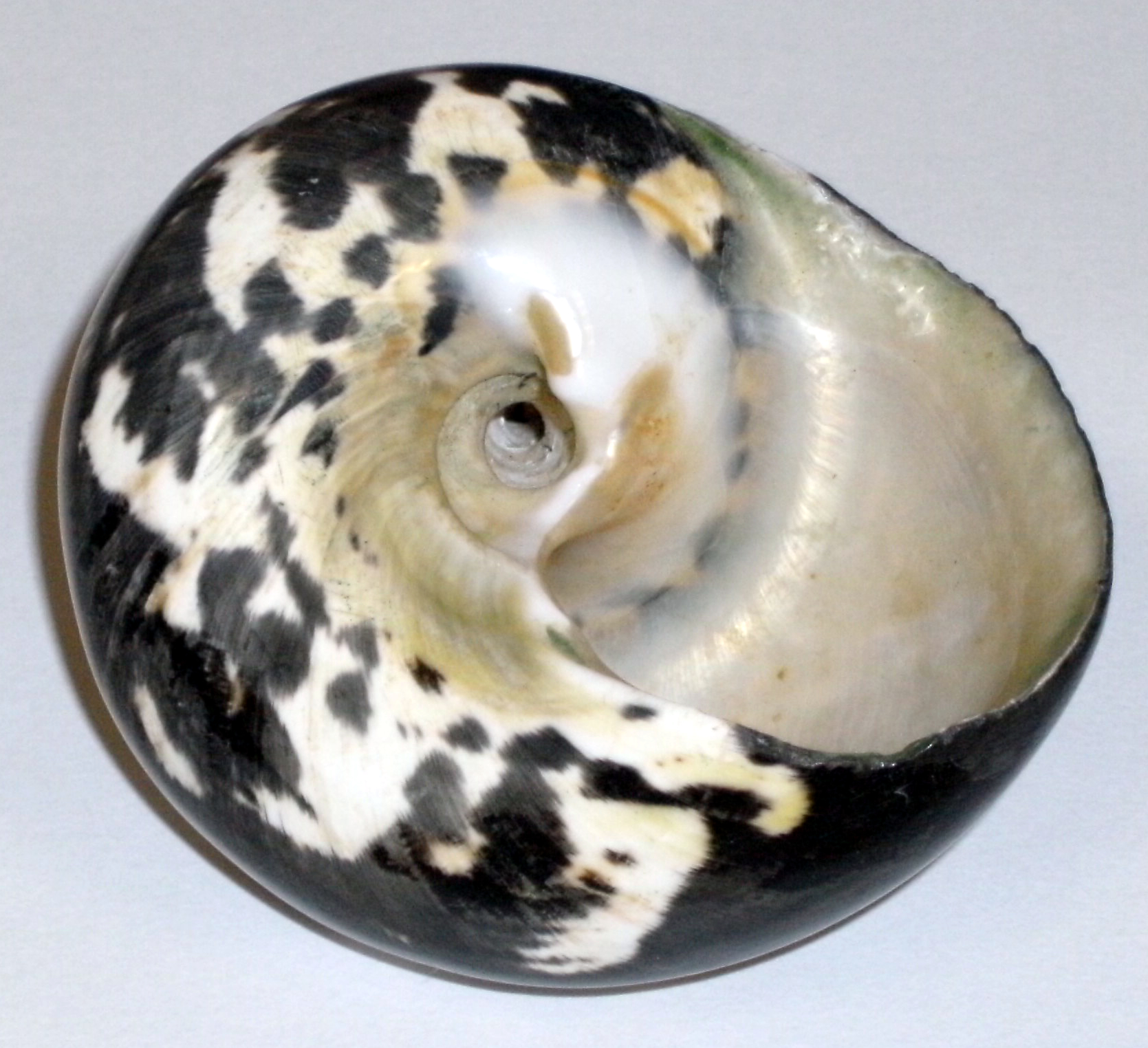
The wide and deep umbilicus of Cittarium pica is easily visible on the underside of the shell.

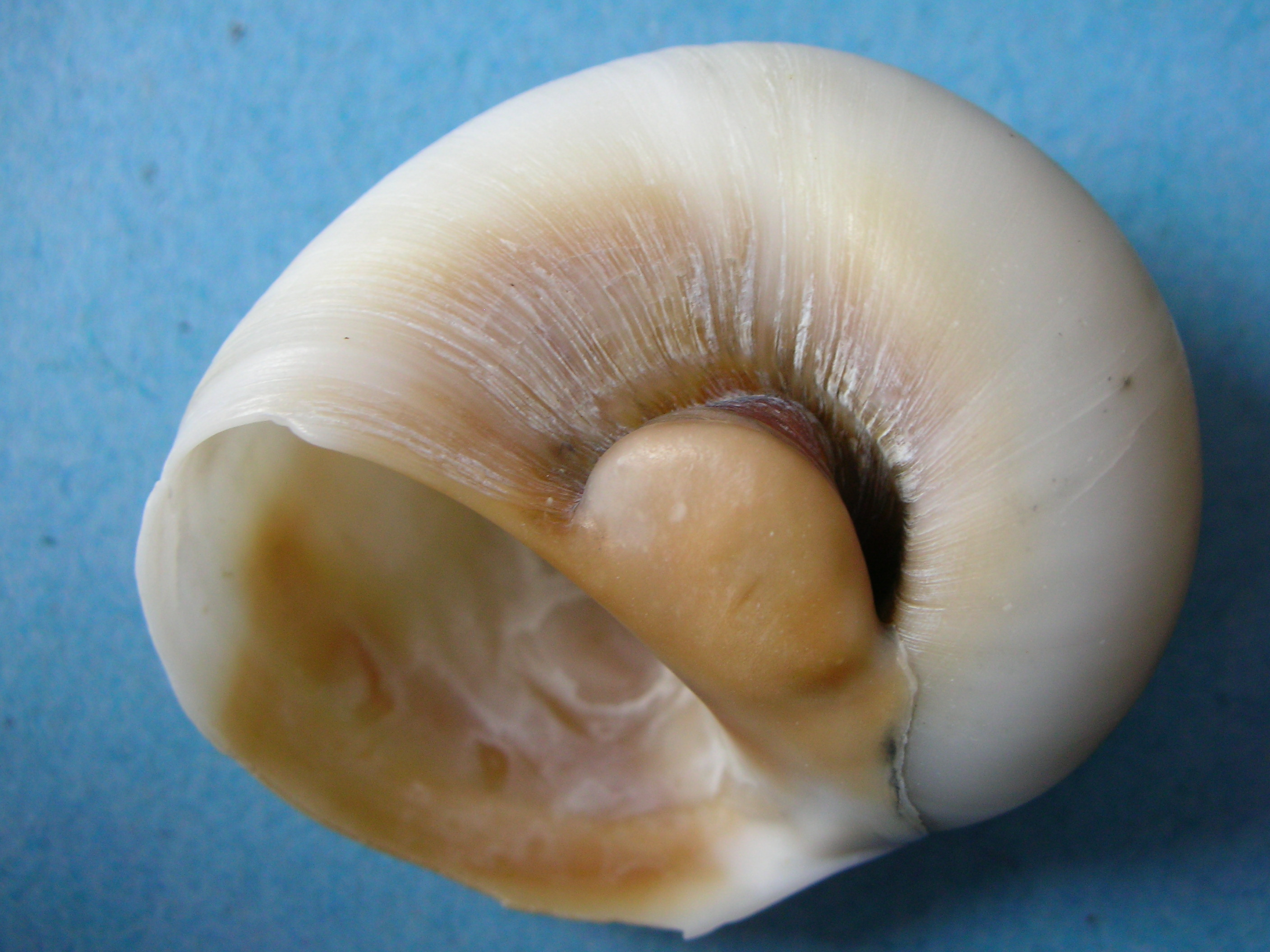
The shell of Neverita josephinia has an umbilical callus which almost completely fills the umbilicus, leaving only a groove, and a chink on one side.

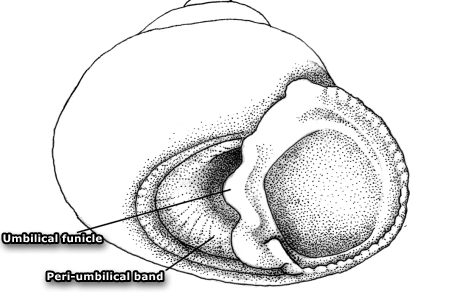
Drawing of a shell showing the umbilical funicle

== In cephalopods ==
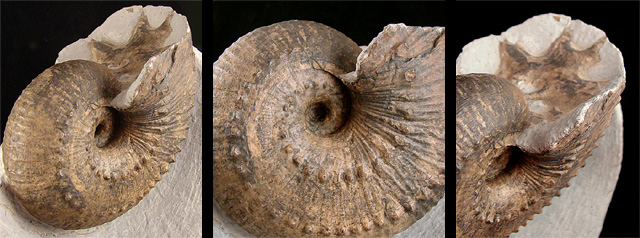
Three views of an ammonite shell, clearly showing the central umbilicus.

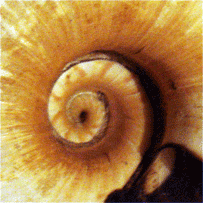
The umbilicus of the shell of the nautilus Allonautilus scrobiculatus
