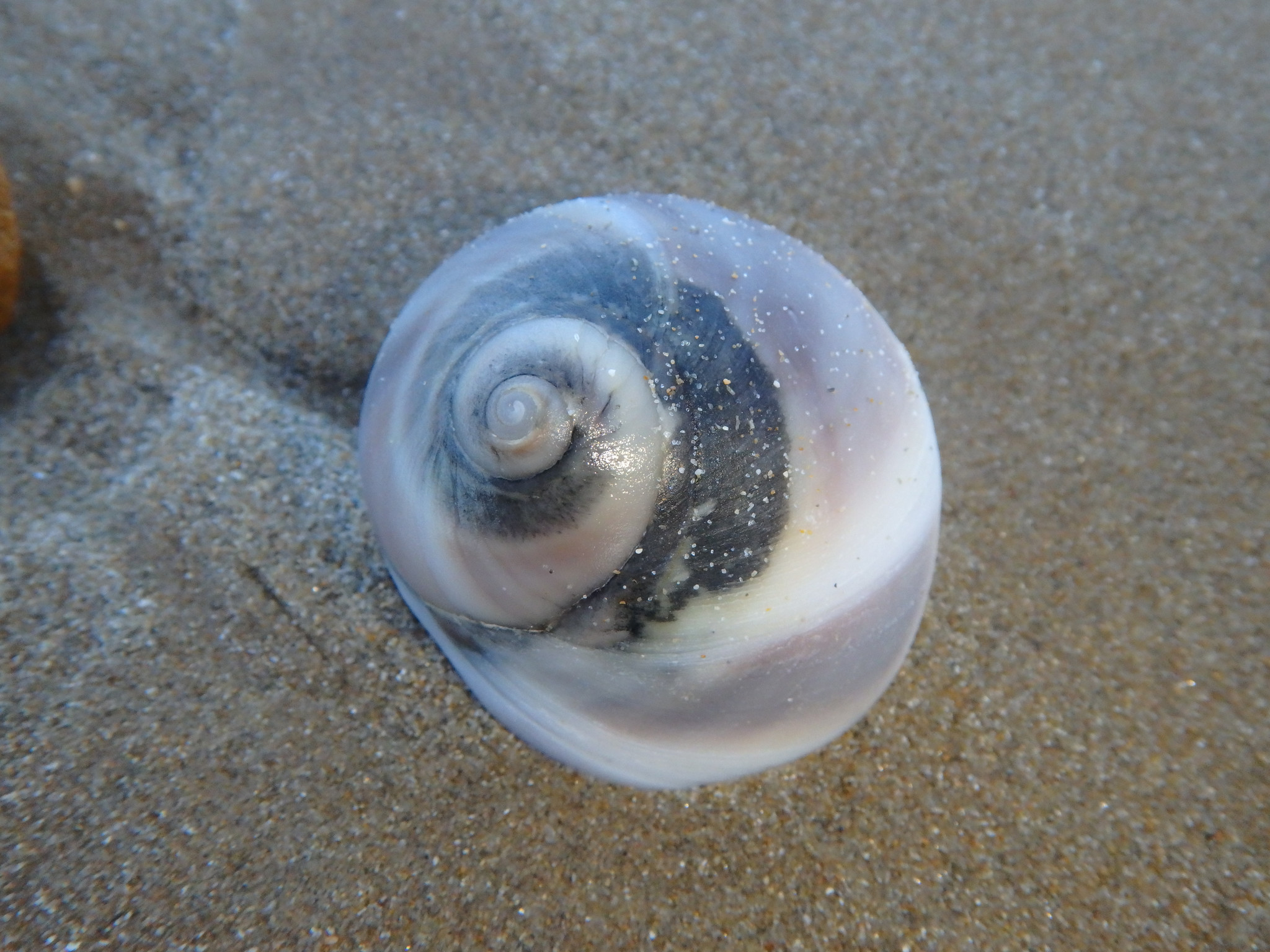

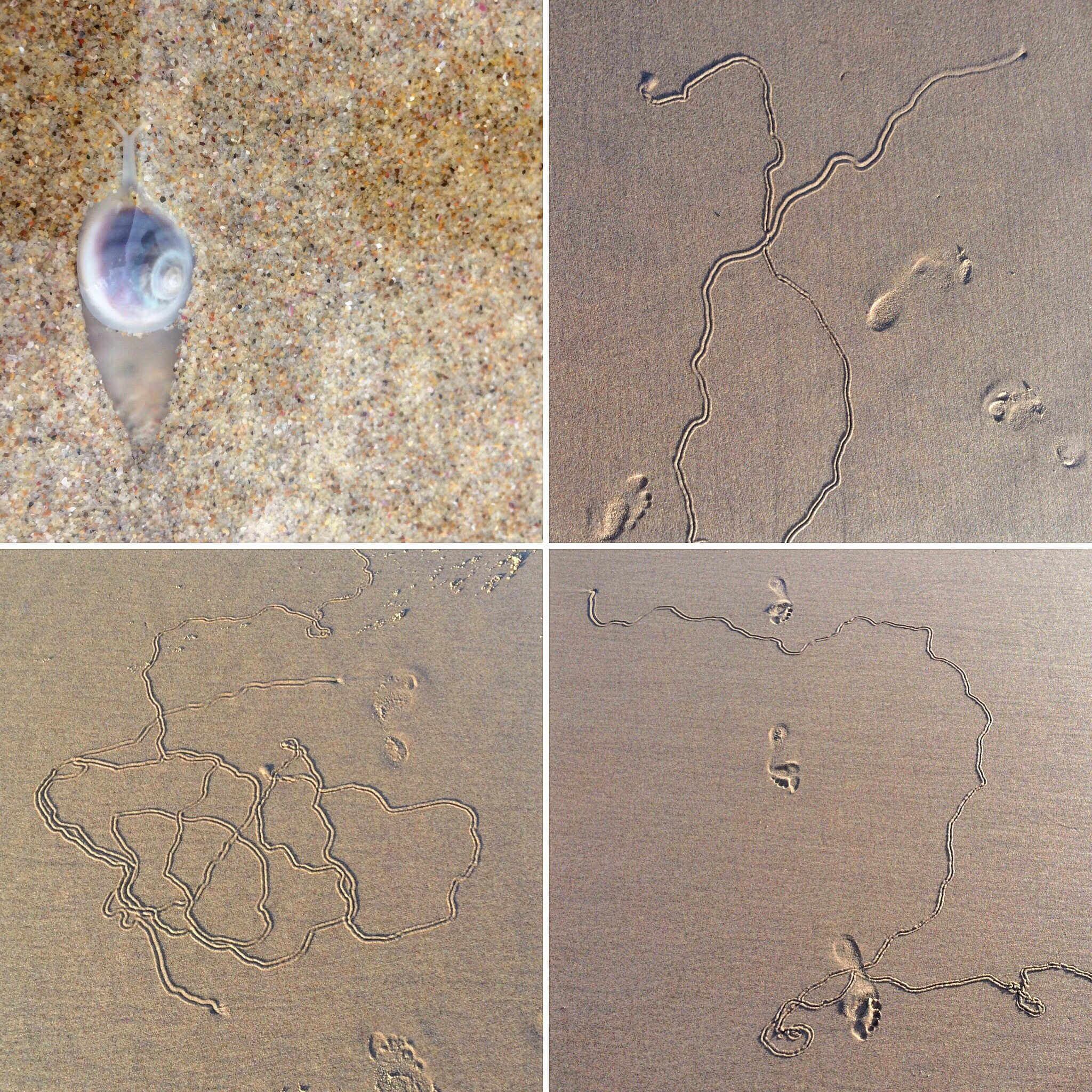

Scientific classification
- Kingdom: Animalia
- Phylum: Mollusca
- Class: Gastropoda
- Subclass: Caenogastropoda
- Order: Littorinimorpha
- Family: Naticidae
- Genus: Conuber
- Species: C. incei

Binomial name
- Conuber incei (R. A. Philippi, 1853)

Synonyms
- Natica incei R. A. Philippi, 1853; Natica baconi Reeve, 1855; Natica deiodosa Reeve, 1855; Natica fibula Reeve, 1855; Polinices incei (R. A. Philippi, 1853)

= Conuber incei =

Species of gastropod

Conuber incei (common name - Ince's Moon Snail, Ince's Sand Snail) is a species of predatory sea snail, in the family Naticidae, the moon snails. It was first described in 1853 as Natica incei by Rodolfo Philippi, from a specimen collected at Raines Island in the Torres Strait, by Captain Ince, R.N. (thus giving the species epithet, Incei).

It is a marine snail found on mud-silt and sand flats. In Australia, it is found in South Australia, Victoria, New South Wales, and Queensland.
