= Polinices peselephanti =

Scientific classification
- Kingdom: Animalia
- Phylum: Mollusca
- Class: Gastropoda
- Subclass: Caenogastropoda
- Order: Littorinimorpha
- Family: Naticidae
- Genus: Polinices
- Species: P. peselephanti

Binomial name
- Polinices peselephanti (Link, 1807)

Synonyms
- Natica funiculata Récluz, 1850; Natica powisiana Récluz, 1844

Species of gastropod

Polinices peselephanti is a species of predatory sea snail, a marine gastropod mollusk in the family Naticidae, the moon snails.
