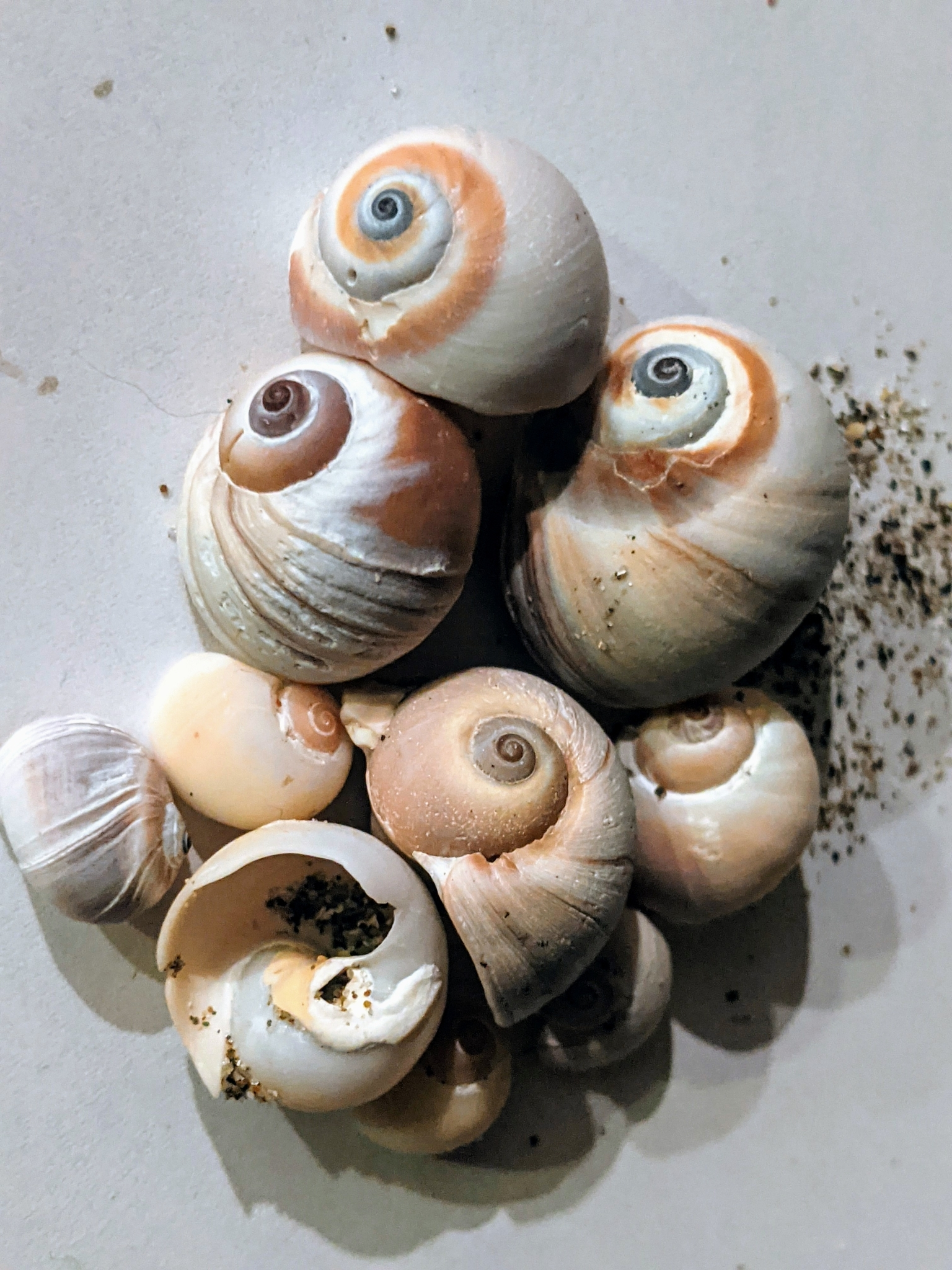
- Shells of Glossaulax reclusiana

Scientific classification
- Kingdom: Animalia
- Phylum: Mollusca
- Class: Gastropoda
- Subclass: Caenogastropoda
- Order: Littorinimorpha
- Family: Naticidae
- Genus: Glossaulax
- Species: G. reclusiana

Binomial name
- Glossaulax reclusiana (Deshayes, 1839)

Synonyms
- Natica reclusiana Deshayes, 1839; Neverita alta Arnold, 1903; Neverita reclusiana (Deshayes, 1839); Neverita reclusiana imperforata Dall, 1909 junior subjective synonym; Neverita recluziana [sic] (Deshayes, 1839) misspelling - incorrect subsequent spelling; Neverita recluziana var. alta (Arnold, 1903 (misspelling; variety); Neverita recluziana var. imperforata Dall, 1909 (variety); Neverita secta Gabb, 1864 † junior subjective synonym; Polinices reclusianus (Deshayes, 1839); Polinices recluzianus [sic] (Deshayes, 1839) (misspelling); Polinices recluzianus alta Arnold, 1903; Polinices recluzianus var. imperforata Dall, 1909 (variety); Polynices (Neverita) recluziana [sic] superseded combination (misspelling) Polynices (Neverita) recluziana var. alta; Arnold, 1903 (variety)

= Glossaulax reclusiana =

Species of gastropod

Glossaulax reclusiana, also known as Recluz's moon snail, is a species of sea snail in the family Naticidae, the moon snails. It is named for French amateur malacologist César Auguste Récluz.

== Description ==
(Original description in Latin) The shell is ovate-conical and swollen, with a smooth or slightly striated surface. It is grayish-lead in color, whitish at the base, and features a dark band around the suture. The umbilicus is large and mostly covered by a callus, which is unevenly divided by a groove. The columella is heavily calloused at the top, white in the upper part, and marked with a dark spot in the lower part. The aperture is ovate-semilunar, with a small channel at the top, and is white to brownish on the inside. The shell can reach 84 millimetres (3.3 in) in height.

== Distribution ==
It is found along the coasts of California and Mexico.

== Habitat ==
G. reclusiana lives in shallow bays and lagoons from the intertidal zone to depths around 49.5 metres (162 ft).

== Behavior ==
Like all moon snails, G. reclusiana is predatory. It feeds on other mollusks, including Callianax biplicata and Chione fluctifraga.
