= Mammilla priamus =

Scientific classification
- Kingdom: Animalia
- Phylum: Mollusca
- Class: Gastropoda
- Subclass: Caenogastropoda
- Order: Littorinimorpha
- Family: Naticidae
- Genus: Mammilla
- Species: M. priamus

Binomial name
- Mammilla priamus (Récluz, 1843)

Synonyms
- Natica priamus Récluz, 1844 (basionym); Polinices priamus (Récluz, 1844)

Species of gastropod

Mammilla priamus is a species of predatory sea snail, a marine gastropod mollusk in the family Naticidae, the moon snails.

== Distribution ==
This species occurs in the Indian Ocean off Mauritius.
