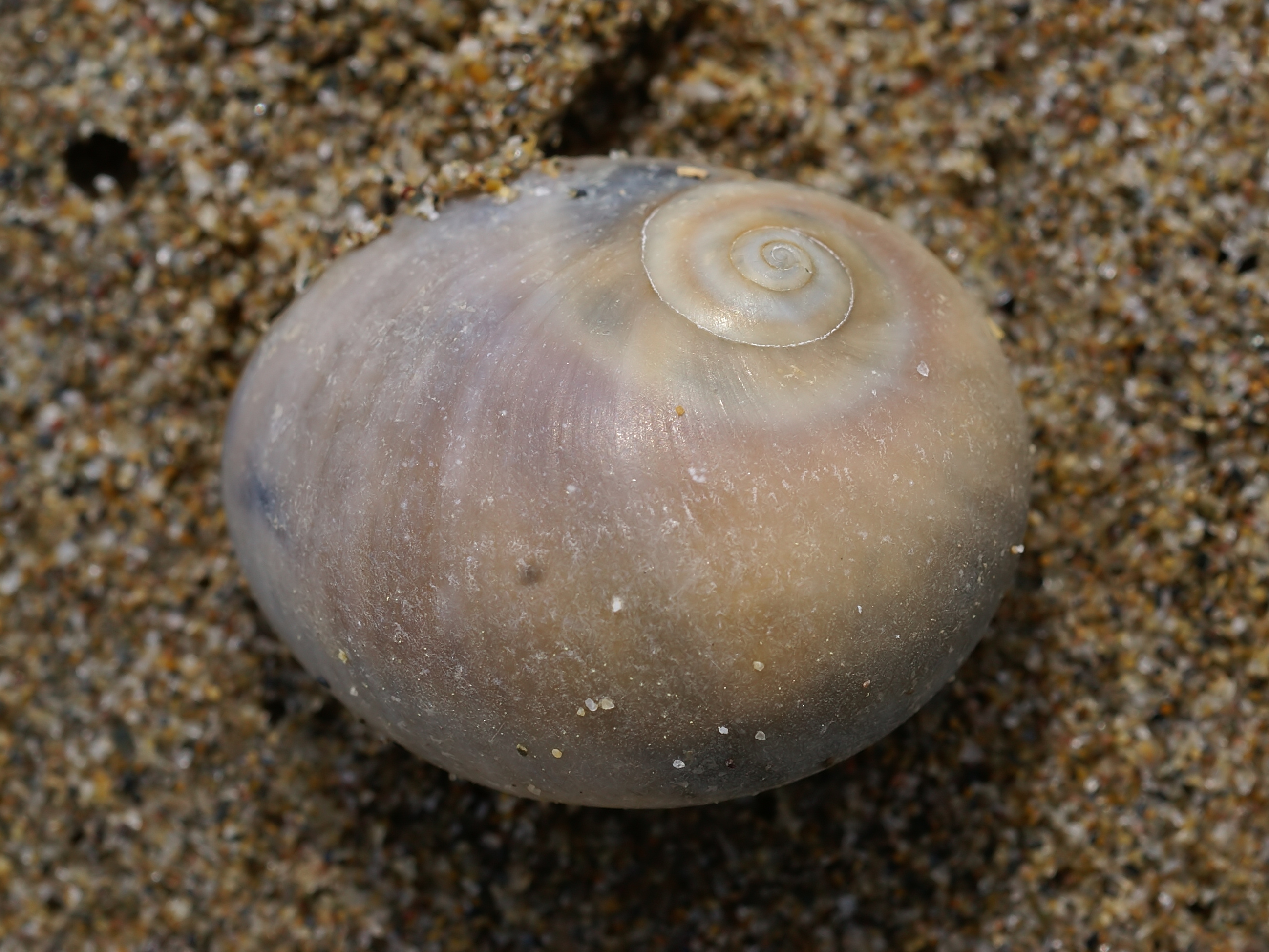

Scientific classification
- Kingdom: Animalia
- Phylum: Mollusca
- Class: Gastropoda
- Subclass: Caenogastropoda
- Order: Littorinimorpha
- Family: Naticidae
- Genus: Neverita
- Species: N. josephinia

Binomial name
- Neverita josephinia Risso, 1826

Synonyms
- Natica josephinia (Risso, 1826); Natica josephinia var. aegyptiaca Pallary, 1912; Natica josephinia var. caelata Bucquoy, Dautzenberg & Dollfus, 1883; Natica philippiana Récluz in Chenu, 1843; Natica philippiana Reeve, 1855; Neverita philippiana (Récluz, C., 1855)

= Neverita josephinia =

Neverita josephinia Temporal range: Oligocene - Recent

Species of mollusc (fossil)

Neverita josephinia is a species of predatory sea snail, a marine gastropod mollusc in the family Naticidae, the moon shells.

This is the type species of the genus Neverita.

The fossil record of this species dates back to the Oligocene (age range: 23.03 to 0.012 million years ago). These fossils have been found in Hungary, Germany, Greece, Italy, Slovakia, Spain and Morocco.

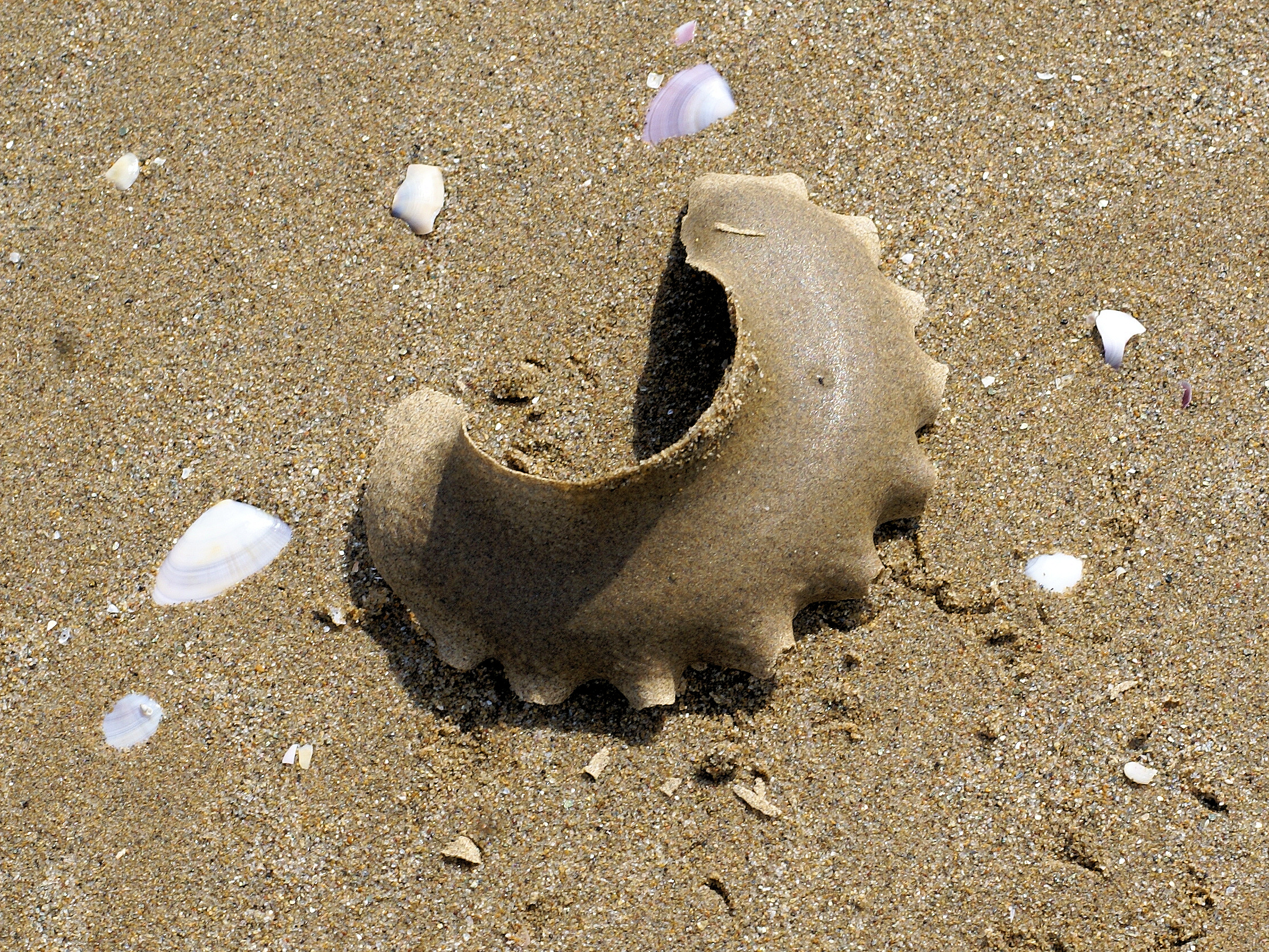
The sand collar of N. josephinia from the Ebro River Delta in Catalonia, Spain

== Distribution ==
This is a Mediterranean species.

== Description ==
Like other species in this genus, this snail has a corneous operculum.
