= Neverita aulacoglossa =

Scientific classification
- Kingdom: Animalia
- Phylum: Mollusca
- Class: Gastropoda
- Subclass: Caenogastropoda
- Order: Littorinimorpha
- Family: Naticidae
- Genus: Neverita
- Species: N. aulacoglossa

Binomial name
- Neverita aulacoglossa (Pilsbry & Vanatta, 1909)

Synonyms
- Glossaulax aulacoglossa (Pilsbry & Vanatta, 1909); Natica chemnitzii Reeve, 1855 (Invalid: junior homonym of Natica chemnitzii Pfeiffer, 1840); Polinices aulacoglossa Pilsbry & Vanatta, 1909 (basionym)

Species of mollusc

Neverita aulacoglossa is a species of sea snail, a marine gastropod mollusc in the family Naticidae, the moons snails.
