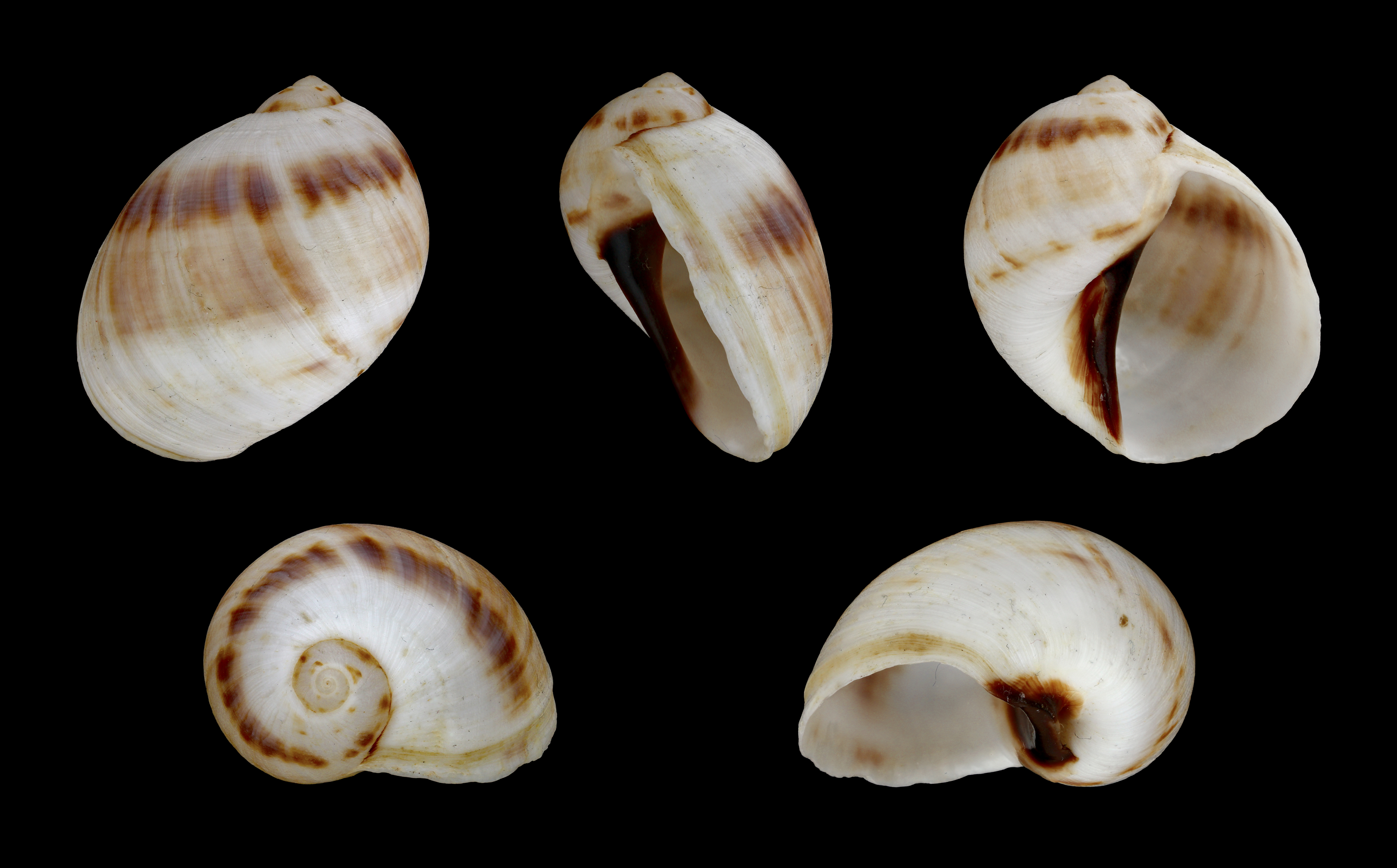
- Five views of a shell of Mammilla sebae

Scientific classification
- Kingdom: Animalia
- Phylum: Mollusca
- Class: Gastropoda
- Subclass: Caenogastropoda
- Order: Littorinimorpha
- Family: Naticidae
- Genus: Mammilla
- Species: M. sebae

Binomial name
- Mammilla sebae (Recluz, 1844)

Synonyms
- Natica sebae Récluz, 1844 (basionym); Natica zanzebarica Récluz, 1844; Polinices sebae (Récluz, 1844); Polinices zanzibarica Recluz, 1844

= Mammilla sebae =

Species of gastropod

Mammilla sebae is a species of predatory sea snail, a marine gastropod mollusc in the family Naticidae, the moon snails.

== Distribution ==
This species occurs in the Indian Ocean off Tanzania.
