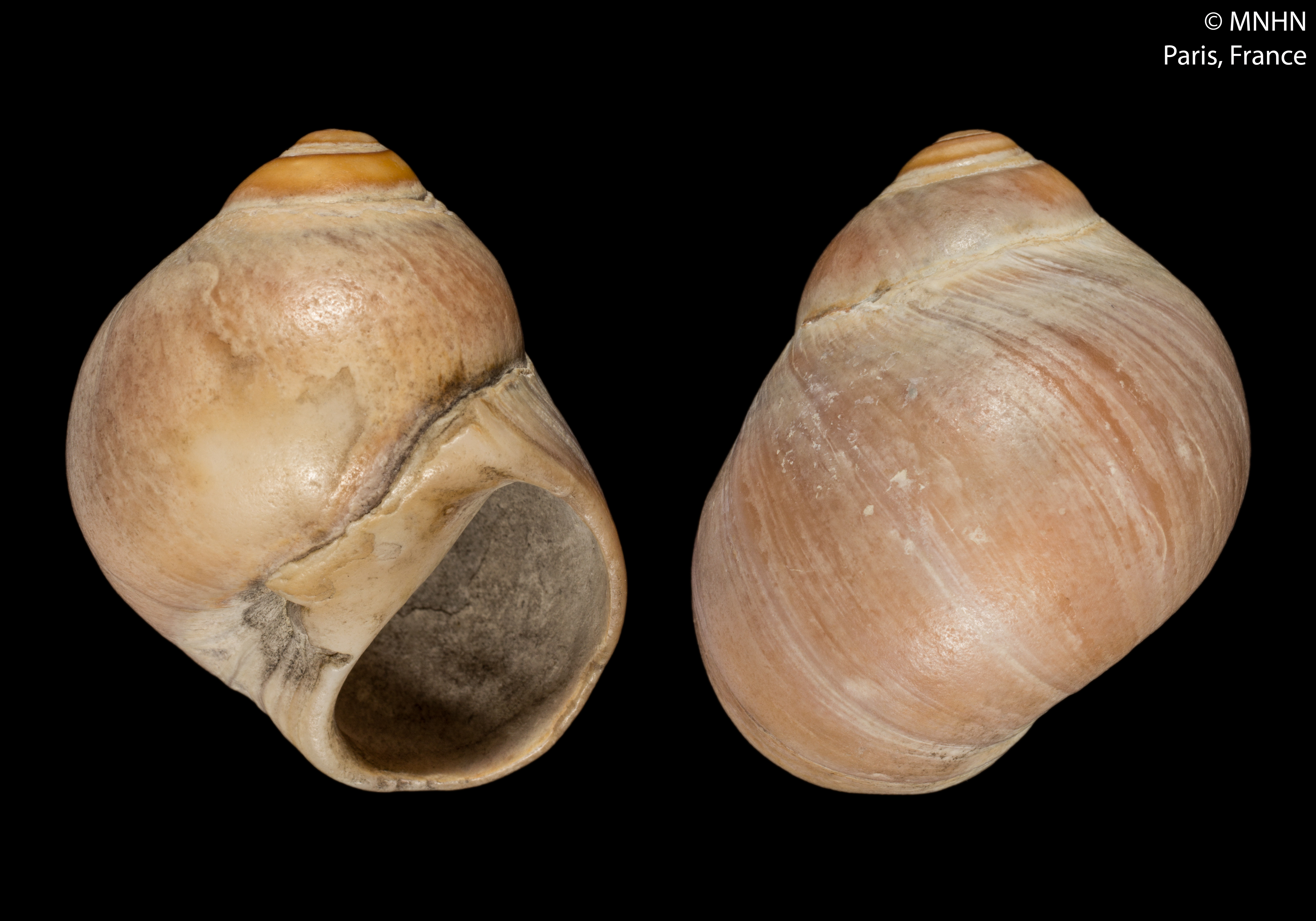
- Shell of Conuber sordidum (holotype at MNHN, Paris)

Scientific classification
- Kingdom: Animalia
- Phylum: Mollusca
- Class: Gastropoda
- Subclass: Caenogastropoda
- Order: Littorinimorpha
- Family: Naticidae
- Genus: Conuber
- Species: C. sordidum

Binomial name
- Conuber sordidum (Swainson, 1821)

Synonyms
- Conuber sordidus (Swainson, 1821); Natica leucophaea Reeve, 1855; Natica microstoma Quoy & Gaimard, 1833; Natica sordida Swainson, 1821; Natica strangei Reeve, 1855; Polinices sordidus (Swainson, 1821)

= Conuber sordidum =

Species of gastropod

Conuber sordidum (originally described as Natica sordida by Swainson) is a species of predatory sea snail, a marine gastropod mollusk family Naticidae, the moon snails.

== Distribution ==
East coast of Australia, from Victoria to Queensland. The species also occurs off Tasmania and New Zealand.

== Life habits ==
Conuber sordidum is predatory, feeding mostly on bivalves and gastropods. The species is also known to prey on the soldier crab Mictyris longicarpus by drilling predation. To catch soldier crabs, C. sordidum uses the same stereotyped behaviour as previously described for moon snails hunting shelled molluscan prey.

== Habitat ==
On intertidal muddy sand flats near mangroves or sea weed.
