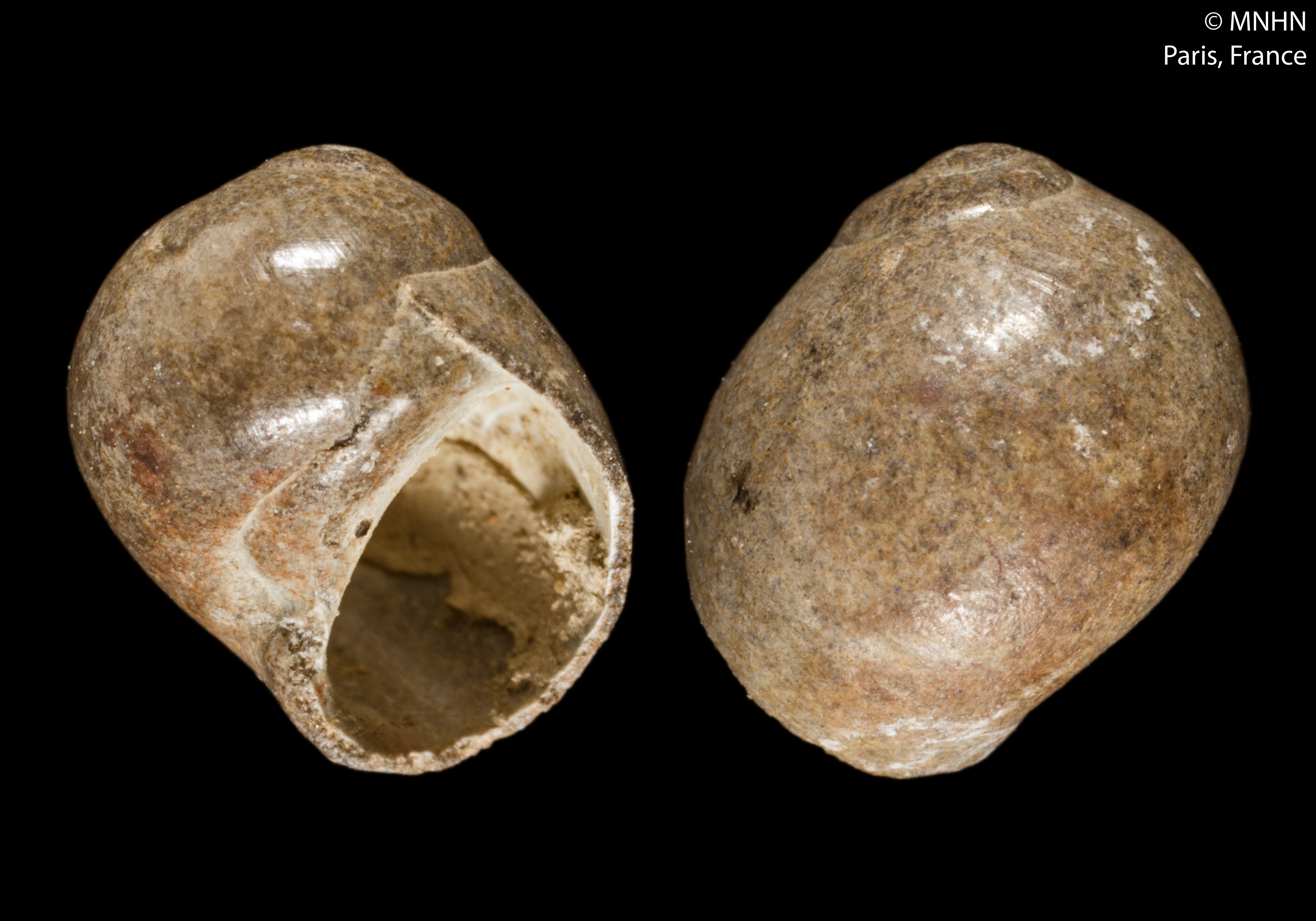
- Shell of Euspira obtusa (lectotype at MNHN, Paris)

Scientific classification
- Kingdom: Animalia
- Phylum: Mollusca
- Class: Gastropoda
- Subclass: Caenogastropoda
- Order: Littorinimorpha
- Family: Naticidae
- Genus: Euspira
- Species: E. obtusa

Binomial name
- Euspira obtusa (Jeffreys, 1885)

Synonyms
- Natica obtusa Jeffreys, 1885 (basionym); Neverita obtusa (Jeffreys, 1885); Neverita pilula Locard, 1897; Polinices obtusa (Jeffreys, 1885)

= Euspira obtusa =

Species of mollusc

Euspira obtusa is a species of predatory sea snail, a marine gastropod mollusc in the family Naticidae, the moon snails.

== Description ==
The length of the shell attains 10.2 mm.

== Distribution ==
This species occurs in European waters (the South Shetland-Faeroe Ridge), in the Atlantic Ocean off Galicia, Spain and the Cape Verdes and West Africa.
