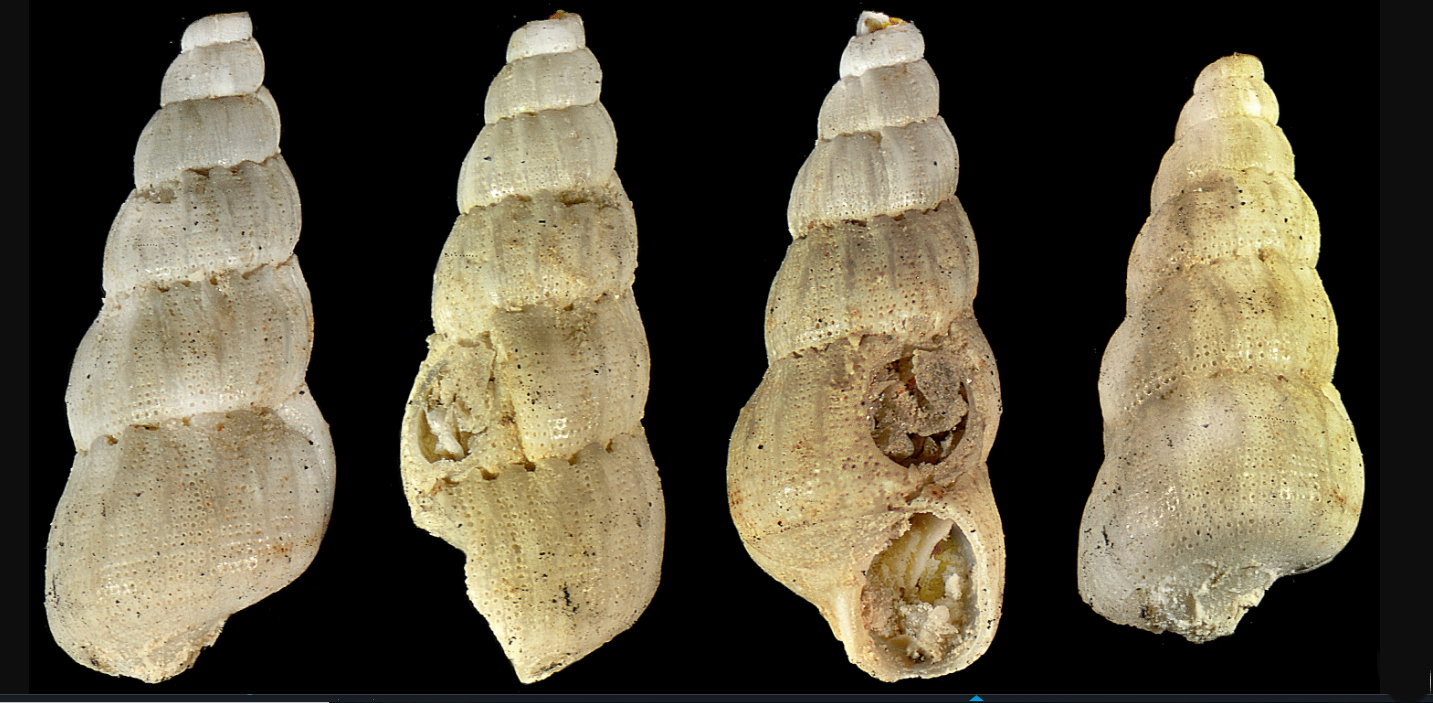
- Opalia coronata shells (holotype at MNHN, Paris)

Scientific classification
- Kingdom: Animalia
- Phylum: Mollusca
- Class: Gastropoda
- Subclass: Caenogastropoda
- Order: incertae sedis
- Superfamily: Epitonioidea
- Family: Epitoniidae
- Genus: Opalia; Boury, 1890

Synonyms
- List of synonyms: Epitonium (Nodiscala) de Boury, 1890 junior subjective synonym; Granuliscala de Boury, 1909; Nodiscala de Boury, 1886 (uncertain); † Opalia (Crassiscala) De Boury, 1887 · accepted, alternate representation; † Opalia (Funiscala) De Boury, 1891 †accepted, alternate representation; Opalia (Nodiscala) de Boury, 1890· accepted, alternate representation; Opalia (Opalia) H. Adams & Adams, 1853; Opalia (Pliciscala) de Boury, 1887· accepted, alternate representation; † Opalia (Rugatiscala) de Boury, 1913 †accepted, alternate representation; Payebrosoma Tapparone-Canefri, 1876; Pliciscala de Boury, 1887; Pliciscala (Nodiscala) de Boury, 1890; Psychrosoma Tapparone-Canefri, 1876; Scala (Dentiscala) de Boury, 1886; Scala (Nodiscala) de Boury, 1890; Scala (Opalia) H. Adams & A. Adams, 1853; † Scala (Pyramiscala) de Boury, 1909

= Opalia (gastropod) =

Genus of gastropods

Opalia is a genus of small sea snails, marine gastropod mollusks in the family Epitoniidae, commonly known as wentletraps.

== Species ==
According to the World Register of Marine Species (WoRMS), the following species with a valid name are included within the genus Opalia :

- Opalia abbotti Clench & Turner, 1952 (after R. Tucker Abbott)
- Opalia aglaia (Bartsch, 1915) (synonym of Gibbula agalia Bartsch, 1915)
- Opalia ahiparana (A. W. B. Powell, 1930)
- Opalia alba (de Boury, 1911)
- Opalia apostolorum (Iredale, 1936)
- Opalia attenuata (Pease, 1860)
- Opalia aurifila (Dall, 1889)
- Opalia australis (Lamarck, 1822)
- Opalia bairdii (E.A. Smith, 1872)
- Opalia ballinensis (E. A. Smith, 1891)
- Opalia bardeyi (Jousseaume, 1912)
- † Opalia basicarinata Lozouet, 1999
- Opalia bicarinata (G. B. Sowerby II, 1844)
- † Opalia billaudeli (Mayer, 1864)
- Opalia burchorum DuShane, 1988
- Opalia burryi Clench & Turner, 1950
- Opalia calyx Nakayama, 2012
- Opalia candida T. Cossignani, 2020
- Opalia colimana Hertlein & Strong, 1951
- Opalia corolla (Melvill & Standen, 1903)
- Opalia coronata (Philippi, 1844)
- Opalia crassilabrum (G.B. Sowerby II, 1844)
- Opalia crenata (Linnaeus, 1758)
- Opalia crenatoides Carpenter, 1864
- Opalia crystallina (Carpenter, 1864)
- Opalia diadema (G. B. Sowerby I, 1832)
- Opalia dushaneae Garcia, 2004
- Opalia eolis Clench & Turner, 1950
- Opalia exopleura (Dall, 1917)
- Opalia felderi Garcia, 2004
- † Opalia flemingi Beu, 2011
- Opalia fortunata Bouchet & Warén, 1986
- Opalia funiculata (Carpenter, 1857)
- Opalia gaini Lamy, 1922
- Opalia garciai Kilburn, 1994
- Opalia gereti (de Boury, 1913)
- Opalia granosa (Quoy & Gaimard, 1834)
- Opalia granulosa de Boury, 1909
- Opalia gruveli (de Boury) (temporary name)
- Opalia hellenica (Forbes, 1844)
- Opalia hidryma (Melvill, 1899)
- Opalia hotessieriana (d’Orbigny, 1842)
- Opalia infrequens (C. B. Adams, 1852)
- † Opalia komitica (Laws, 1944)
- Opalia japonica (Okutani, 1964)
- Opalia koskinum (Hedley, 1909)
- Opalia leeana (A. E. Verrill, 1882)
- Opalia levis Nakayama, 2010
- Opalia longissima Garcia, 2004
- Opalia lorenzi T. Cossignani, 2020
- † Opalia mackayi P. A. Maxwell, 1992
- Opalia mammosa (Melvill & Standen, 1903)
- Opalia martis (Thiele, 1925)
- Opalia matajiroi (Kuroda, 1954)
- Opalia mauritanica Talavera, 1975
- Opalia maxwelli (H. J. Finlay, 1930)
- Opalia megalodon Garcia, 2004
- Opalia methoria Kilburn, 1985
- Opalia mexicana Dall, 1908
- Opalia minervae (Thiele, 1925)
- Opalia monovaricosa (Kuroda & Habe, 1961)
- Opalia montereyensis (Dall, 1907)
- Opalia morchiana (Dall, 1889)
- Opalia mormulaeformis (Masahito, Kuroda & Habe, 1971)
- Opalia neocaledonica Garcia, 2004
- † Opalia nympha (Hutton, 1885)
- Opalia pacoi Engl, 2002
- Opalia paucisculpta Bozzetti, 2007
- Opalia paulula DuShane, 1974
- † Opalia peyrerensis Lozouet, 1999
- Opalia pseudoescalaris (Melvill & Standen, 1901)
- Opalia pumilio (Libassi, 1859)
- Opalia punctata (Thiele, 1925)
- Opalia pupipunctata (de Boury, 1911)
- Opalia revizee Lima & Christoffersen, 2014
- Opalia sanjuanensis (Lowe, 1932)
- Opalia soror (Odhner, 1919)
- Opalia spongiosa Carpenter, 1866
- Opalia subcrassa (Cotton & Godfrey, 1938)
- Opalia sumatrensis (Thiele, 1925)
- † Opalia tenuispiralis (P. Marshall, 1919)
- Opalia texta (E. A. Smith, 1903)
- Opalia thorsenae Garcia, 2004
- Opalia tortipunctata Weil, L. Brown & Neville, 1999
- Opalia turnerae Garcia, 2004
- Opalia velumnuptialis Garcia, 2004
- † Opalia waikakahiensis (P. A. Maxwell, 1992)
- Opalia wareni Garcia, 2004
- Opalia wroblewskyi (Mörch, 1875)
- Opalia zelandica Finlay, 1930

Species brought into synonymy

- Opalia andrewsii (A. E. Verrill, 1882): synonym of Cylindriscala andrewsii (A. E. Verrill, 1882)
- Opalia antarctica (E. A. Smith, 1907): synonym of Acirsa antarctica (E. A. Smith, 1907)
- Opalia barbadensis (de Boury, 1913): synonym of Opalia pumilio var. morchiana (Dall, 1889): synonym of Opalia morchiana (Dall, 1889)
- Opalia borealis Keep, 1881: synonym of Opalia wroblewskyi (Mörch, 1875)
- Opalia bullata Carpenter, 1864: synonym of Opalia infrequens (C. B. Adams, 1852)
- Opalia cerigottana Sturany, 1896: synonym of Punctiscala cerigottana (Sturany, 1896)
- Opalia chacei Strong, 1937: synonym of Opalia wroblewskyi (Mörch, 1875)
- Opalia consors (Crosse & P. Fischer, 1864): synonym of Gyroscala lamellosa (Lamarck, 1822)
- Opalia coronata (Scacchi, 1844): synonym of Opalia hellenica (Forbes, 1844)
- Opalia corsicana Nordsieck, 1974: synonym of Acirsa subdecussata (Cantraine, 1835)
- Opalia crenulata (Kiener, 1839): synonym of Opalia crenata (Linnaeus, 1758)
- Opalia dromio Dall, 1927: synonym of Opaliopsis opalina (Dall, 1927)
- Opalia espirita (Baker, Hanna & Strong, 1930): synonym of Opalia crystallina (Carpenter, 1864)
- Opalia evicta (de Boury, 1919): synonym of Opalia montereyensis (Dall, 1907)
- Opalia fregata (Iredale, 1936): synonym of Cirsotrema fregata (Iredale, 1936)
- Opalia fusoides (Jousseaume, 1912): synonym of Opalia bicarinata (G. B. Sowerby II, 1844)
- Opalia fusticulus Gaglini, 1992: synonym of Opalia abbotti Clench & Turner, 1952
- Opalia gracilis (Masahito, Kuroda & Habe, 1971): synonym of Opalia bicarinata (G. B. Sowerby II, 1844)
- Opalia grossicostata (Nyst, 1871): synonym of Opalia hotessieriana (d'Orbigny, 1842)
- Opalia humerosa (Schepman, 1909): synonym of Cylindriscala humerosa (Schepman, 1909)
- Opalia insculpta Carpenter, 1865: synonym of Opalia crenatoides Carpenter, 1864
- Opalia japonica (Okutani, 1964): synonym of Papuliscala japonica (Okutani, 1964)
- Opalia linteata (Schwengel, 1943): synonym of Opalia pumilio (Mörch, 1875)
- Opalia magellanica (Philippi, 1845): synonym of Epitonium magellanicum (Philippi, 1845)
- Opalia mazatlanica Dall, 1908: synonym of Opalia infrequens (C. B. Adams, 1852)
- Opalia nicolayi Nordsieck, 1974: synonym of Opalia abbotti Clench & Turner, 1952
- Opalia nodosocarinata (Dall, 1889): synonym of Opalia pumilio (Mörch, 1875)
- † Opalia plicosa (Philippi, 1844) : synonym of † Punctiscala plicosa (Philippi, 1844)
- Opalia pluricostata Dall, 1917: synonym of Opalia montereyensis (Dall, 1907)
- Opalia retiporosa (Carpenter, 1866): synonym of Opalia spongiosa Carpenter, 1864
- Opalia revizee Lima, Christoffersen, Barros & Folly, 2012: synonym of Opalia revizee Lima & Christoffersen, 2014
- Opalia terebralioides Kilburn, 1975: synonym of Claviscala terebralioides (Kilburn, 1975)
- Opalia tortilis (Watson, 1883): synonym of Cylindriscala tortilis (Watson, 1883)
- Opalia torulosa (Brocchi, 1814): synonym of Claviscala richardi (Dautzenberg & de Boury, 1897)
- Opalia tremperi Bartsch, 1927: synonym of Opalia infrequens (C. B. Adams, 1852)
- Opalia valida (Verco, 1906): synonym of Cirsotrema validum (Verco, 1906)
