= G. commutata =

G. commutata may refer to:

- Gagea commutata, a plant with linear leaves
- Grevillea commutata, a flowering plant
- Gyroscala commutata, a sea snail
