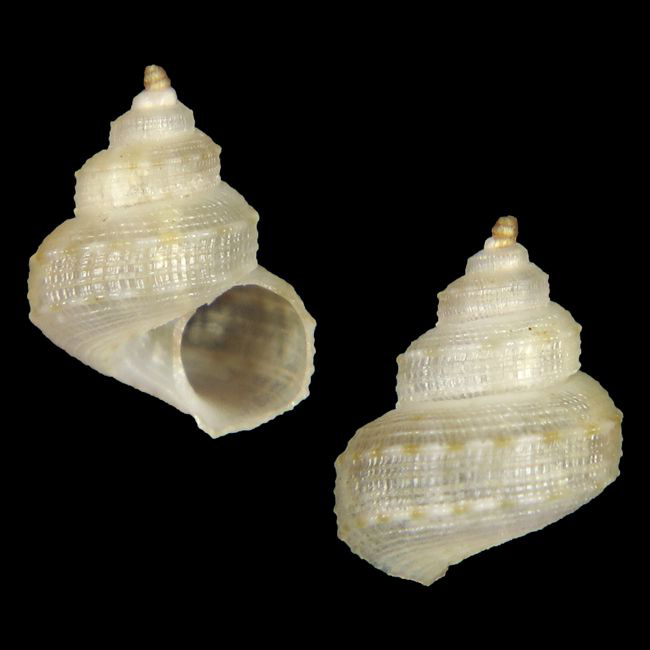

Scientific classification
- Kingdom: Animalia
- Phylum: Mollusca
- Class: Gastropoda
- Subclass: Caenogastropoda
- Order: incertae sedis
- Family: Epitoniidae
- Genus: Iphitus
- Species: I. boucheti

Binomial name
- Iphitus boucheti Poppe & Tagaro, 2016

= Iphitus boucheti =

Species of gastropod

Iphitus boucheti is a species of sea snail, a marine gastropod mollusc in the family Epitoniidae.

== Description ==
The length of the shell attains 3.8 mm.

== Original description ==
- Poppe G.T. & Tagaro S. (2016). New marine mollusks from the central Philippines in the families Aclididae, Chilodontidae, Cuspidariidae, Nuculanidae, Nystiellidae, Seraphsidae and Vanikoridae. Visaya. 4(5): 83-103. page(s): 90.

== Distribution ==
This marine species occurs off the Philippines.
