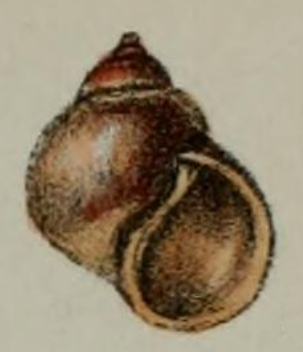
- Shell of Alexania globula (holotype)

Scientific classification
- Kingdom: Animalia
- Phylum: Mollusca
- Class: Gastropoda
- Subclass: Caenogastropoda
- Order: incertae sedis
- Family: Epitoniidae
- Genus: Alexania
- Species: A. globula

Binomial name
- Alexania globula (Angas, 1880)

Synonyms
- Amauropsis globulus Angas, 1880 superseded combination; Pellilitorina globula (Angas, 1880) superseded combination; Problitora globula (Angas, 1880) superseded combination

= Alexania globula =

Species of gastropod

Alexania globula is a species of predatory sea snails, marine prosobranch gastropod mollusks in the family Epitoniidae.

== Description ==
(Original description) The rimate shell is globosely turbinate. It is rather thin, and shiny, with an orange horn color that becomes much paler on the body whorl near the aperture. It has 4 convex whorls, with two narrow, raised concentric keels on the subapical whorl. The body whorl is very large and nearly smooth, marked by a few descending growth lines, crossed sporadically by extremely fine, delicate, closely set concentric striae, visible only under magnification. The aperture is semilunar, with a thin, simple, and arcuate outer lip. The columella is slightly thickened and expanded over the umbilicus.

== Distribution ==
This marine species is endemic to Australia and occurs off South Australia, Tasmania and Victoria
