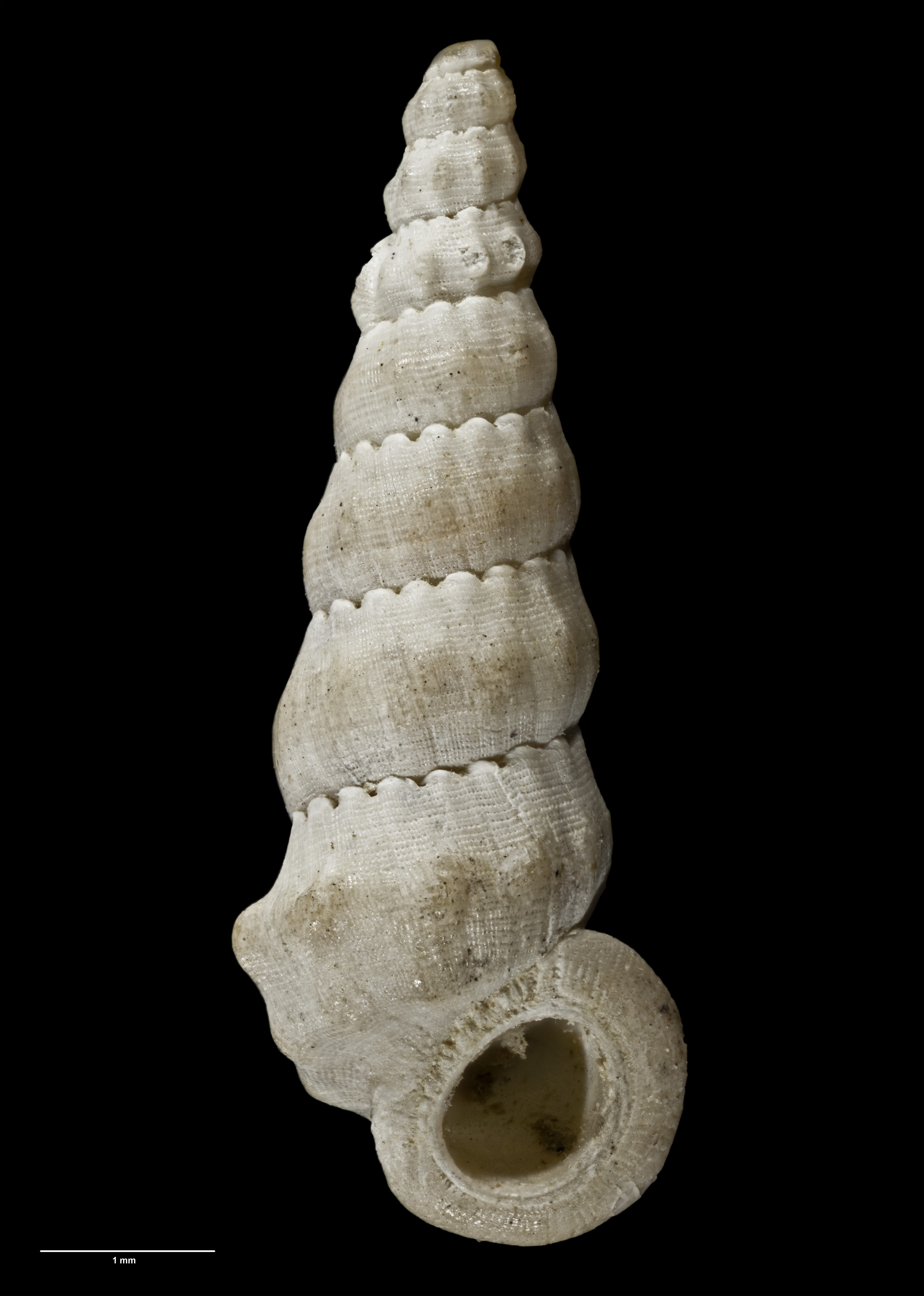

Scientific classification
- Kingdom: Animalia
- Phylum: Mollusca
- Class: Gastropoda
- Subclass: Caenogastropoda
- Order: incertae sedis
- Family: Epitoniidae
- Genus: Opalia
- Species: O. ahiparana

Binomial name
- Opalia ahiparana Powell, 1930

Synonyms
- Nodiscala ahiparana (Powell, 1930); Pliciscala ahiparana Powell, 1930 (original combination)

= Opalia ahiparana =

Species of gastropod

Opalia ahiparana is a species of very small deepwater sea snail, a marine gastropod mollusk in the family Epitoniidae, the wentletraps.

== Distribution ==
This marine species is endemic to New Zealand.
