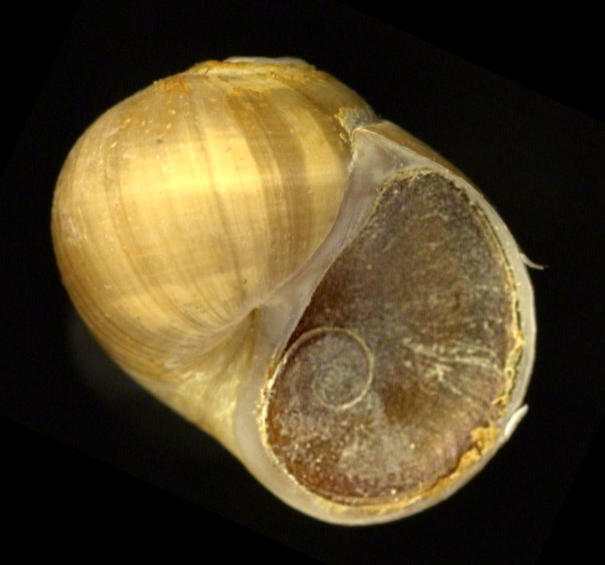
- Shell of Amauropsis anderssoni

Scientific classification
- Kingdom: Animalia
- Phylum: Mollusca
- Class: Gastropoda
- Subclass: Caenogastropoda
- Order: Littorinimorpha
- Superfamily: Naticoidea
- Family: Naticidae
- Genus: Amauropsis; Mörch, 1857

Type species
- Nerita islandica Gmelin, 1791

Species
- See text

Synonyms
- Acrybia (Amauropsis) Mörch, 1857; Amauropsis (Amauropsis) Mörch, 1857; Bulbus (Amauropsis) Morch, 1857 superseded combination; Choristes Carpenter 1872; Mamma (Amauropsis) Mörch, 1857 (original rank); Natica (Amauropsis) Mörch, 1857; Polynices (Amauropsis) Mörch, 1857 alternative representation

= Amauropsis =

Genus of gastropods

Amauropsis is a genus of predatory sea snails, marine gastropod mollusks in the family Naticidae, the moon snails.

== Species ==
Species within the genus Amauropsis include:

- Amauropsis anderssoni (Strebel, 1906)
- Amauropsis apora (R. B. Watson, 1881)
- Amauropsis aureolutea (Strebel, 1908)
- Amauropsis bransfieldensis (Preston, 1916)
- Amauropsis brassiculina (Locard, 1897)
- Amauropsis georgiana (Strebel, 1908)
- Amauropsis islandica (Gmelin, 1791)
- † Amauropsis notoleptos Stilwell, Zinsmeister & Oleinik, 2004
- Amauropsis powelli Dell, 1990
- Amauropsis prasina (Watson, 1881)
- Amauropsis rossiana Smith, 1907
- Amauropsis sphaeroides (Jeffreys, 1877)
- Amauropsis subpallescens (Strebel, 1908)

Species brought into synonymy

- † Amauropsis arenacea (O. Fraas, 1861) : synonym of † Omphaloptycha arenacea (O. Fraas, 1861) (superseded combination)
- † Amauropsis calypso (A. d'Orbigny, 1850): synonym of † Oonia calypso (A. d'Orbigny, 1850) (superseded combination)
- Amauropsis cornea (Möller, 1842): synonym of Amauropsis islandica (Gmelin, 1791) (junior subjective synonym)
- Amauropsis globulus Angas, 1880: synonym of Problitora globula (Angas, 1880)
- Amauropsis moerchi A. Adams & Angas, 1864: synonym of Problitora moerchi (A. Adams & Angas, 1864): synonym of Alexania moerchi (A. Adams & Angas, 1864)
- Amauropsis perscalpta (E. von Martens, 1878): synonym of Natica perscalpta E. von Martens, 1878
- Amauropsis purpurea Dall, 1871: synonym of Amauropsis islandica (Gmelin, 1791)
- Amauropsis subperforata (Dell, 1956): synonym of Falsilunatia subperforata Dell, 1956
- Amauropsis xantha (Watson, 1881): synonym of Falsilunatia xantha (Watson, 1881)
- † Amauropsis zelandica Bloklander, 1949: synonym of † Phasianema zelandicum (Bloklander, 1949) (superseded combination)

Uncertain species

- Amauropsis godfroyi (Lamy, 1910) (taxon inquirendum)

== Additional sources and external links ==
- Torigoe K. & Inaba A. (2011). "Revision on the classification of Recent Naticidae". Bulletin of the Nishinomiya Shell Museum. 7: 133 + 15 pp., 4 pls.
- Gofas, S.; Le Renard, J.; Bouchet, P. (2001). "Mollusca". in: Costello, M.J. et al. (eds), European Register of Marine Species: a check-list of the marine species in Europe and a bibliography of guides to their identification. Patrimoines Naturels. 50: 180–213
- Dall, W.H. (1890–1903). "Contributions to the Tertiary fauna of Florida with especial reference to the Miocene silex-beds of Tampa and the Pliocene beds of the Caloosahatchie River". Transactions of the Wagner Free Institute of Science. 3 (1): 377.
- Mørch O. A. (1857). "Fortegnelse over Grønlands Bløddyr". [in] Rink, Grønland geographisk og statistik beskrivet. Kjøbenhavn, Louis Klein: 75–100
