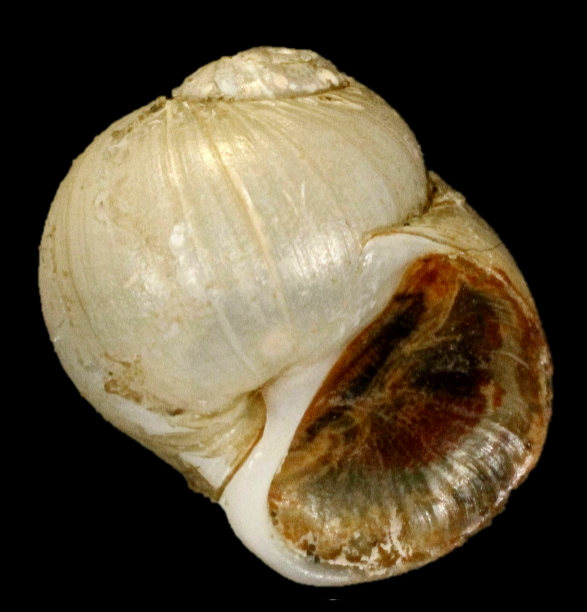
- Shell of Amauropsis aureolutea (specimen at Naturalis Biodiversity Center)

Scientific classification
- Kingdom: Animalia
- Phylum: Mollusca
- Class: Gastropoda
- Subclass: Caenogastropoda
- Order: Littorinimorpha
- Family: Naticidae
- Genus: Amauropsis
- Species: A. aureolutea

Binomial name
- Amauropsis aureolutea (Strebel, 1908)

Synonyms
- Natica aureolutea Strebel, 1908 (original combination)

= Amauropsis aureolutea =

Species of gastropod

Amauropsis aureolutea is a species of predatory sea snail, a marine gastropod mollusk in the family Naticidae, the moon snails.

== Description ==
The maximum recorded shell length is 32 mm. The minimum recorded depth is 6 m, while the maximum recorded depth is 662 m.

(Original description in German) The shell is orange-brown in color. It is more spherical in contrast to the more rhomboid-rounded contour of Amauropsis anderssoni. The umbilicus is concealed by a protruding tongue of the columellar overhang. The apex features a larger nucleus than that of A. anderssoni, though the operculum remains the same.

The sculpture consists of growth lines and a faint, somewhat irregularly arranged, dense grooving. The suture lacks a compressed zone.

== Distribution ==
This marine species occurs off the Falkland Islands, South Georgia, South Sandwich Islands and in the Southern Ocean.
