= Alexania callizona =

Scientific classification
- Kingdom: Animalia
- Phylum: Mollusca
- Class: Gastropoda
- Subclass: Caenogastropoda
- Order: incertae sedis
- Family: Epitoniidae
- Genus: Alexania
- Species: A. callizona

Binomial name
- Alexania callizona (T. Habe, 1961)

Synonyms
- Habea callizona T. Habe, 1961 superseded combination

Species of gastropod

Alexania callizona is a species of predatory sea snails, marine prosobranch gastropod mollusks in the family Epitoniidae.

== Distribution ==
This marine species is occurs off Japan.
