= Murdochella levifoliata =

Scientific classification
- Kingdom: Animalia
- Phylum: Mollusca
- Class: Gastropoda
- Subclass: Caenogastropoda
- Order: incertae sedis
- Family: Epitoniidae
- Genus: Murdochella
- Species: M. levifoliata

Binomial name
- Murdochella levifoliata (Murdoch & Suter, 1906)

Synonyms
- Scala levifoliata Murdoch & Suter, 1906

Species of gastropod

Murdochella levifoliata is a species of minute wentletrap, a sea snail, a marine gastropod mollusc or micromollusc in the family Epitoniidae.

This species is only known to occur in New Zealand.
