= Alexania natalensis =

Scientific classification
- Kingdom: Animalia
- Phylum: Mollusca
- Class: Gastropoda
- Subclass: Caenogastropoda
- Order: incertae sedis
- Family: Epitoniidae
- Genus: Alexania
- Species: A. natalensis

Binomial name
- Alexania natalensis (Tomlin, 1926)

Species of gastropod

Alexania natalensis is a species of predatory sea snails, marine prosobranch gastropod mollusks in the family Epitoniidae.

== Distribution ==
This marine species occurs off KwaZulu-Natal, South Africa.
