= Murdochella alacer =

Scientific classification
- Kingdom: Animalia
- Phylum: Mollusca
- Class: Gastropoda
- Subclass: Caenogastropoda
- Order: incertae sedis
- Family: Epitoniidae
- Genus: Murdochella
- Species: M. alacer

Binomial name
- Murdochella alacer Finlay, 1927

Species of gastropod

Murdochella alacer is a species of minute wentletrap, a sea snail, a marine gastropod mollusc or micromollusc in the family Epitoniidae, found in New Zealand.
