= Funiscala =

Scientific classification
- Kingdom: Animalia
- Phylum: Mollusca
- Class: Gastropoda
- Subclass: Caenogastropoda
- Order: incertae sedis
- Family: Epitoniidae
- Genus: Funiscala; Boury, 1891

Species
- See text.

Genus of gastropods

Funiscala is a genus of small sea snails, marine gastropod molluscs in the family Epitoniidae, commonly known as wentletraps.

== Species ==
Species within the genus Funiscala include:

- Funiscala maxwelli Finlay, 1930
- † Funiscala nympha Hutton, 1885
- † Funiscala speyeri Sacco, 1890
