= Alexania floridana =

Scientific classification
- Kingdom: Animalia
- Phylum: Mollusca
- Class: Gastropoda
- Subclass: Caenogastropoda
- Order: incertae sedis
- Family: Epitoniidae
- Genus: Alexania
- Species: A. floridana

Binomial name
- Alexania floridana (Pilsbry, 1945)

Synonyms
- Habea floridana (Pilsbry, 1945) superseded combination; Stenacme floridana Pilsbry, 1945 superseded combination

Species of gastropod

Alexania floridana is a species of predatory sea snails, marine prosobranch gastropod mollusks in the family Epitoniidae.

== Description ==
The height of the shell attains 6 mm (0.24 in), its greatest diameter 4.5 mm (0.18 in).

== Distribution ==
This marine species is endemic to the United States and occurs off Florida.
