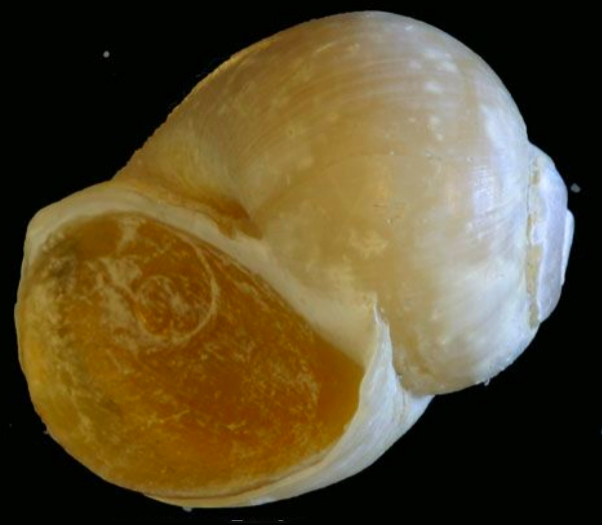
- Shell of Amauropsis subpallescens (specimen at the Swedish Museum of Natural History)

Scientific classification
- Kingdom: Animalia
- Phylum: Mollusca
- Class: Gastropoda
- Subclass: Caenogastropoda
- Order: Littorinimorpha
- Family: Naticidae
- Genus: Amauropsis
- Species: A. subpallescens

Binomial name
- Amauropsis subpallescens (Strebel, 1908)

Synonyms
- Natica subpallescens Strebel, 1908 (original combination)

= Amauropsis subpallescens =

Species of gastropod

Amauropsis subpallescens is a species of predatory sea snail, a marine gastropod mollusk in the family Naticidae, the moon snails.

== Description ==
The length of the shell attains 9.3 mm, its diameter 7.1 mm.

(Original description in German) Only one specimen of similar shape to the preceding species is available, but it has a very light greenish-gray coloration and a more closed umbilicus compared to the presumed Natica grisea Requien, 1848. The basal edge lies slightly lower than in Amauropsis georgiana, although it shares the same operculum as the latter. The apex is also worn down, and it appears to have had 3½ whorls.

== Distribution ==
This marine species occurs off the Antarctic Peninsula.
