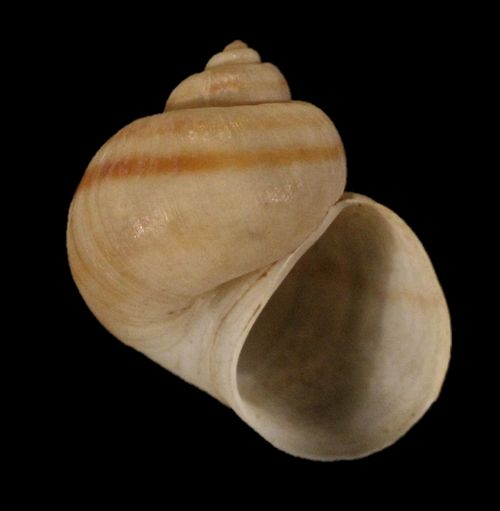
- Shell of Alexania inazawai (specimen at Naturalis Biodiversity Center)

Scientific classification
- Kingdom: Animalia
- Phylum: Mollusca
- Class: Gastropoda
- Subclass: Caenogastropoda
- Order: incertae sedis
- Family: Epitoniidae
- Genus: Alexania
- Species: A. inazawai

Binomial name
- Alexania inazawai (Kuroda, 1943)

Synonyms
- Habea inazawai Kuroda, 1943

= Alexania inazawai =

Species of gastropod

Alexania inazawai is a species of predatory sea snails, marine prosobranch gastropod mollusks in the family Epitoniidae.

== Distribution ==
This marine species occurs off Japan
