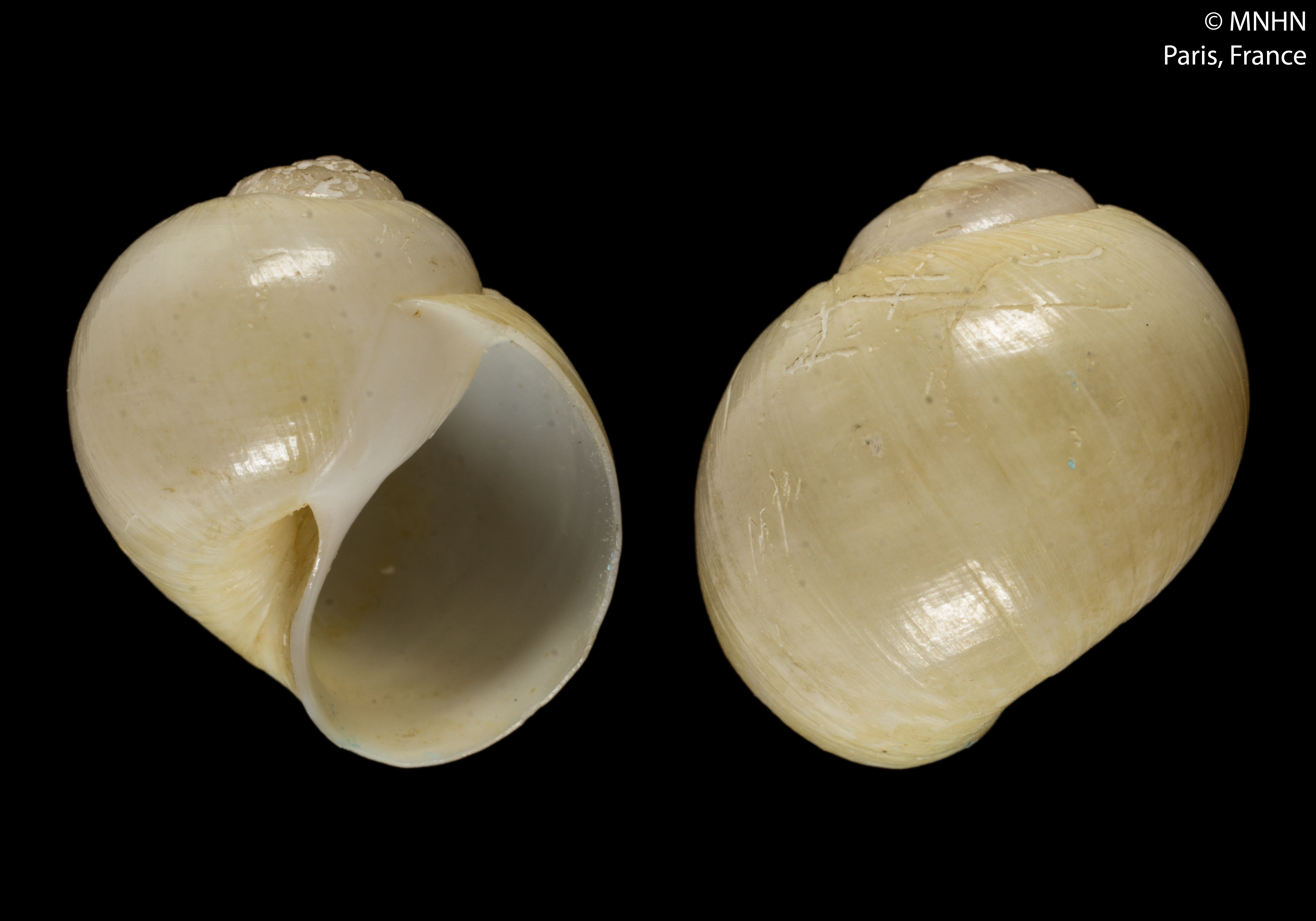
- Shell of Amauropsis brassiculina (lectotype at MNHN, Paris)

Scientific classification
- Kingdom: Animalia
- Phylum: Mollusca
- Class: Gastropoda
- Subclass: Caenogastropoda
- Order: Littorinimorpha
- Family: Naticidae
- Genus: Amauropsis
- Species: A. brassiculina

Binomial name
- Amauropsis brassiculina (Locard, 1897)

Synonyms
- Natica brachya Locard, 1897 (unavailable name: introduced in synonymy and never used as valid); Natica brassiculina Locard, 1897 (original combination); Natica bullula Locard, 1897; Natica olivella Locard, 1897; Natica olivella var. major Locard, 1897

= Amauropsis brassiculina =

Species of gastropod

Amauropsis brassiculina is a species of predatory sea snail, a marine gastropod mollusk in the family Naticidae, the moon snails.

== Description ==
The length of the shell attains 8 mm having diameter 6½ mm.

(Original description in French) The shell is fairly small, with a very globular shape and a diameter where the body whorl is highly developed, accounting for 7/9 of the total height. The lateral profile on the side opposite the outer lip is well-rounded, then tapers fairly quickly towards the base.

The suture is canaliculated, broad, and deep, making it very pronounced. The apex is slender, rounded and nipple-shaped, flattened, and not prominent. The umbilicus is extremely small, slightly flared at its beginning, and partly concealed by the development of the columellar margin.

The aperture is large, semi-oval in shape, occupying more than three-quarters of the total height. It is slightly angular at the top and perfectly rounded at the base, set in a plane oblique to the main axis. The peristome is simple, with a sharp external margin that inserts noticeably above the midpoint of the penultimate whorl. It follows a slightly oblique direction, with a well-arched lateral profile, becoming rounded at the base. The columellar margin is straight at the base before connecting with the outer edge and is slightly reflected, accompanied by a highly developed callus at the top.

The shell is solid but somewhat thin, adorned with oblique, flexuous longitudinal striations that are very faint and irregular, becoming more noticeable on the lower part of the body whorl and near the suture.

The coloration is milky white, transitioning to a glossy white inside the aperture. The operculum is corneous, thin, sparsely striated, with a nucleus close to the columellar margin and slightly recessed within the shell.

== Distribution ==
This marine species occurs in the Atlantic Ocean off Spain, the Western Sahara and Mauritania.
