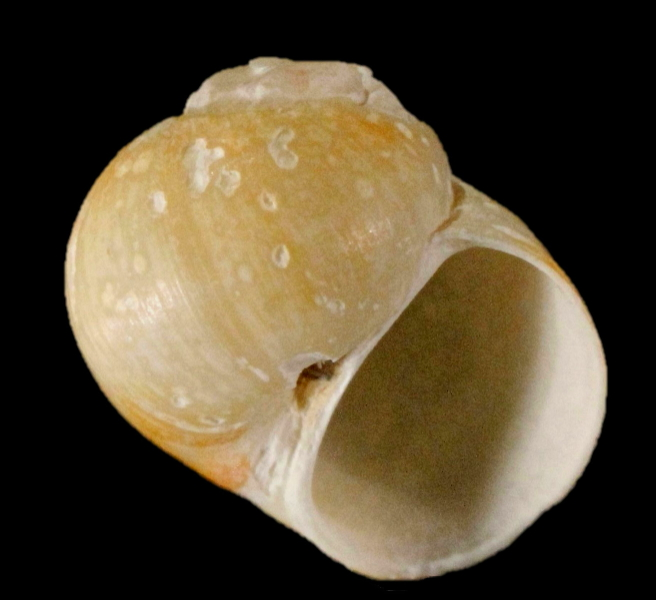
- Shell of Amauropsis bransfieldensis (specimen at Naturalis Biodiversity Center)

Scientific classification
- Kingdom: Animalia
- Phylum: Mollusca
- Class: Gastropoda
- Subclass: Caenogastropoda
- Order: Littorinimorpha
- Family: Naticidae
- Genus: Amauropsis
- Species: A. bransfieldensis

Binomial name
- Amauropsis bransfieldensis (Preston, 1916)

Synonyms
- Lunatia bransfieldensis Preston, 1916 superseded combination

= Amauropsis bransfieldensis =

Species of gastropod

Amauropsis bransfieldensis is a species of predatory sea snail, a marine gastropod mollusk in the family Naticidae, commonly known as moon snails.

== Description ==
(Original description) The shell is perforate, ovate, and slightly elongated toward the base, with a whitish coloration. It consists of 3¼ whorls, with the body whorl being large, descending in front, and smooth. The suture is distinctly impressed, and the umbilicus is narrow and deep.

The columellar margin descends obliquely, then curves rather sharply before descending very obliquely in the opposite direction. It extends above into a thickened, white, well-defined parietal callus, which recedes in the middle to form a broad, distinct sinus.

The outer lip is simple, and the aperture is ovate in shape. The operculum is concave, corneous, shiny, and multi-laminate, with three whorls and an eccentric nucleus.

== Distribution ==
This marine species occurs off the South Shetland Islands.
