= Cycloscala =

Scientific classification
- Kingdom: Animalia
- Phylum: Mollusca
- Class: Gastropoda
- Subclass: Caenogastropoda
- Order: incertae sedis
- Family: Epitoniidae
- Genus: Cycloscala; Dall, 1889

Type species
- Scala dunkeriana Dall, W.H., 1889

Species
- See text

Synonyms
- Epitonium (Kiiscala) Nakayama, 1995; Solvaclathrus Iredale, 1936

Genus of gastropods

Cycloscala is a genus of predatory sea snails, marine prosobranch gastropod mollusks in the family Epitoniidae, commonly known as wentletraps.

== Species ==
According to the World Register of Marine Species, the following species with valid names are included within the genus Cycloscala :

- Cycloscala aldeynzeri E. F. Garcia, 2001
- Cycloscala armata Garcia, 2004
- Cycloscala crenulata (Pease, 1867)
- Cycloscala echinaticosta (d’Orbigny, 1842)
- Cycloscala gazae Kilburn, 1985
- Cycloscala hyalina (Sowerby G.B. II, 1844)
- Cycloscala laxata (G. B. Sowerby, 1844)
- Cycloscala laxatoides (Kuroda in Nakayama, 1995)
- Cycloscala montrouzieri Garcia, 2004
- Cycloscala parvilobata de Boury, MS
- Cycloscala revoluta (Hedley, 1899)
- Cycloscala sardellae Garcia, 2004
- Cycloscala semidisjuncta (Jeffreys, 1884)
- Cycloscala soluta (A. Adams, 1862)
- Cycloscala spinosa Nakayama, 2000

Species brought into synonymy

- Cycloscala anguina (Jousseaume, 1912): synonym of Cycloscala crenulata (Pease, 1867)
- Cycloscala blandii (Mörch, 1875): synonym of Cycloscala echinaticosta (d’Orbigny, 1842)
- Cycloscala hyalina (Pilsbry, 1921): synonym of Cycloscala hyalina (Sowerby G.B. II, 1844)
- Cycloscala inconstans (de Boury, 1913): synonym of Cycloscala echinaticosta (d’Orbigny, 1842)
- Cycloscala jomardi (Audouin, 1827): synonym of Epitonium jomardi (Audouin, 1827)
- Cycloscala latedisjuncta (de Boury, 1911): synonym of Cycloscala revoluta (Hedley, 1899)
- Cycloscala okezoko Habe, 1961: synonym of Epitonium okezoko (Habe, 1961)
- Cycloscala volubilis (Mörch, 1875) synonym of Cycloscala echinaticosta (d’Orbigny, 1842)
