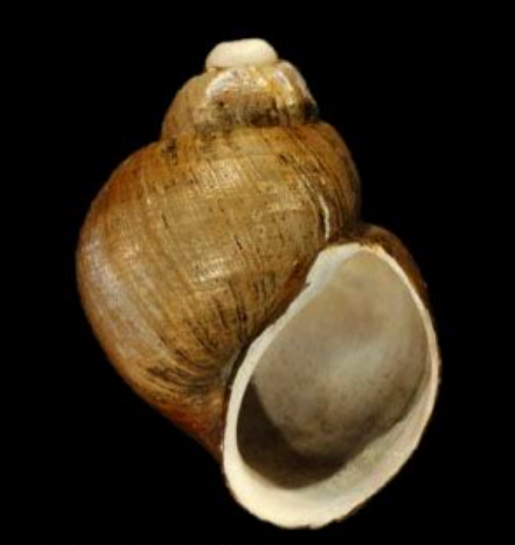
- Shell of Amauropsis islandica (specimen at the Natural History Museum, Rotterdam)

Scientific classification
- Kingdom: Animalia
- Phylum: Mollusca
- Class: Gastropoda
- Subclass: Caenogastropoda
- Order: Littorinimorpha
- Family: Naticidae
- Genus: Amauropsis
- Species: A. islandica

Binomial name
- Amauropsis islandica (Gmelin, 1791)

Synonyms
- Acrybia (Amauropsis) islandica (Gmelin, 1791) superseded combination; Amauropsis cornea (Möller, 1842) junior subjective synonym; Amauropsis islandicus (Gmelin, 1791); Amauropsis purpurea Dall, 1871; Bulbus (Amauropsis) islandicus (Gmelin, 1791) superseded combination; Choristes elegans Carpenter, 1872; Mamma (Lunatia) islandica (Gmelin, 1791) superseded combination; Natica (Amauropsis) islandica (Gmelin, 1791) superseded combination; Natica canaliculata A. Gould, 1840 (Invalid: junior primary homonym of Natica canaliculata Deshayes, 1832; Natica gouldii C. B. Adams, 1847 is a replacement name; Natica cornea Møller, 1842; Natica exulans A. Gould, 1841 (junior subjective synonym); Natica gouldii C. B. Adams, 1847 (Invalid: junior primary homonym of Natica gouldii Philippi, 1845; Natica helicoides Johnston, 1835; Natica islandica (Gmelin, 1791) superseded combination; Natica purpurea (Dall, 1871) (dubious synonym); Nerita islandica Gmelin, 1791 (original combination)

= Amauropsis islandica =

Species of gastropod

Amauropsis islandica, common name the Iceland moonsnail, is a species of predatory sea snail, a marine gastropod mollusk in the family Naticidae, the moon snails.

== Description ==
The maximum recorded shell length is 40 mm.

(Description of Amauropsis purpurea) The shell is elongate-globose, coated with a yellowish epidermis, and exhibits a purple-brown hue that weathers to a purplish-white tone. It comprises four inflated, globose whorls with a deeply canaliculated suture.

The aperture exceeds half the length of the shell and is ovate in shape. The outer lip is thin, while the columella is white, thickened, and smoothly rounded. A thin callus lines the inner lip. The umbilicus is either closed or reduced to a mere chink. The spire is very short and bluntly rounded.

The shell’s surface features numerous closely spaced, fine revolving grooves interspersed with a few faint ridges, adding a subtle texture to its otherwise smooth appearance.

== Distribution ==
This marine species occurs off Greenland, Canada (Newfoundland, Nova Scotia), United States (Maine, Massachusetts, Alaska), and on the Georges Bank.

== Habitat ==
Minimum recorded depth is 9 m. Maximum recorded depth is 240 m.
