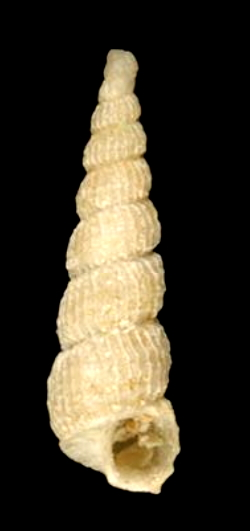
- Shell of Murdochella macrina (holotype at the Australian Myseum)

Scientific classification
- Kingdom: Animalia
- Phylum: Mollusca
- Class: Gastropoda
- Subclass: Caenogastropoda
- Order: incertae sedis
- Superfamily: Epitonioidea
- Family: Epitoniidae
- Genus: Murdochella; Finlay, 1927

Type species
- Scala levifoliata Murdoch & Suter, 1906

Species
- See text

= Murdochella =

Genus of gastropods

Murdochella is a genus of small sea snails, marine gastropods in the family Epitoniidae, the wentletraps, the purple snails, and their allies.

== Species ==
The following species are recognised in the genus Murdochella:

- Murdochella alacer Finlay, 1927
- Murdochella antarctica Dell, 1990
- Murdochella crispata Kilburn, 1985
- Murdochella levifoliata (Murdoch & Suter, 1906)
- Murdochella lobata Kilburn, 1985
- Murdochella macrina Iredale, 1936
- Murdochella tricingulata Campagnari & Geiger, 2018
- Murdochella turritelliformis L. G. Brown, 2019

=== Former species ===
- Murdochella magellanica (Philippi, 1845): synonym of Cirsotrema magellanicum (R. A. Philippi, 1845)
- Murdochella superlata Finlay, 1930 - synonymized with Papuliscala superlata (Finlay, 1930)
- Murdochella tertia Finlay, 1930 - synonymized with Murdochella alacer Finlay, 1927
