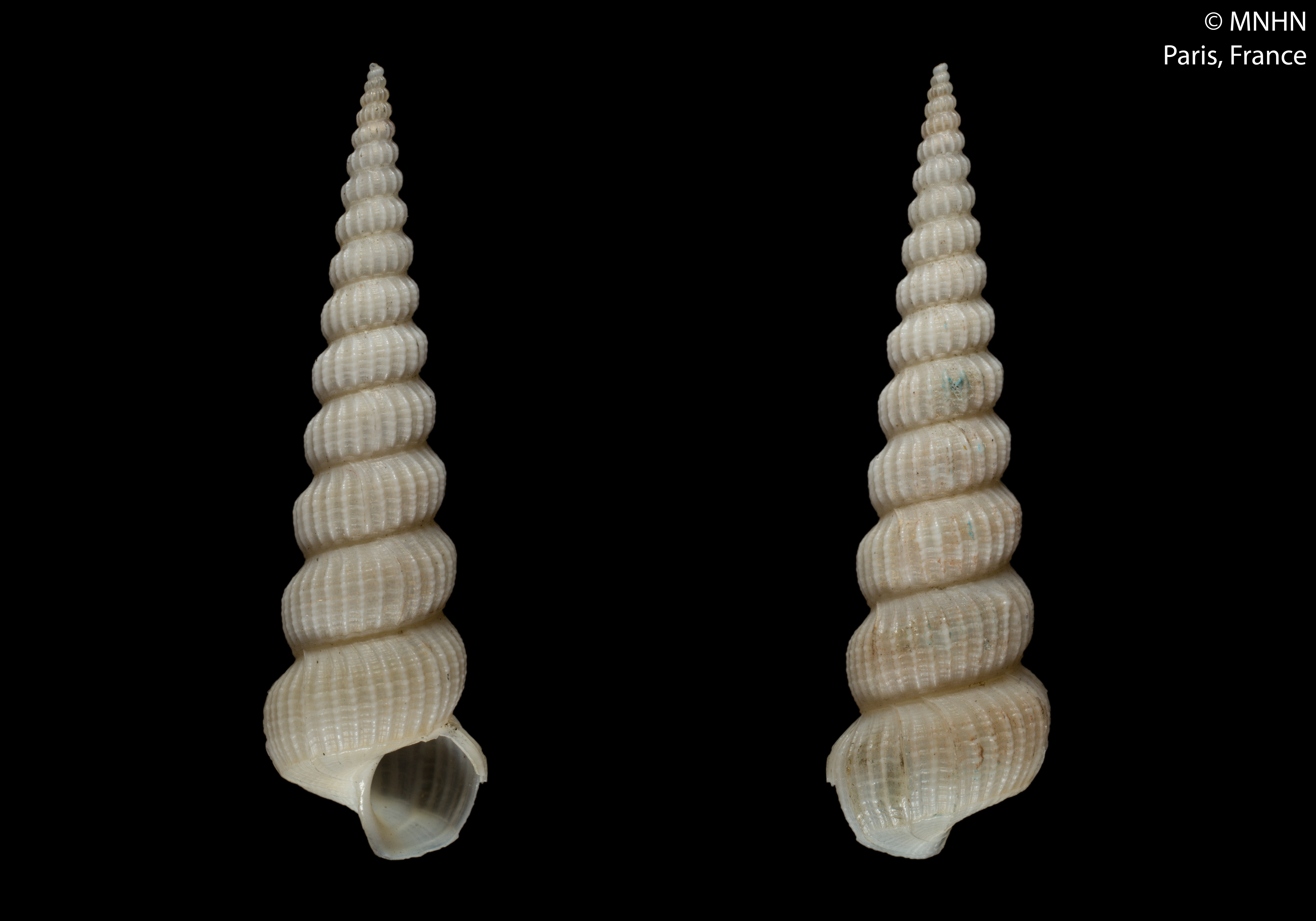
- Shell of Cylindriscala mirifica (syntype at MNHN, Paris)

Scientific classification
- Kingdom: Animalia
- Phylum: Mollusca
- Class: Gastropoda
- Subclass: Caenogastropoda
- Order: incertae sedis
- Superfamily: Epitonioidea
- Family: Epitoniidae
- Genus: Cylindriscala de Boury, 1909

Type species
- Scala fulgens de Boury, 1909

Synonyms
- Lampropalia Kuroda & Ito, 1961; Scala (Cylindriscala) de Boury, 1909 (original rank); Torquatiscala de Boury, 1912

= Cylindriscala =

Genus of gastropods

Cylindriscala is a genus of predatory sea snails, marine prosobranch gastropod mollusks in the family Epitoniidae, commonly known as wentletraps.

== Species ==
According to the World Register of Marine Species, the following species with valid names are included within the genus Cylindriscala :

- Cylindriscala acus (R. B. Watson, 1883)
- Cylindriscala aequatorialis (Thiele, 1925)
- Cylindriscala andrewsii (A. E. Verrill, 1882)
- Cylindriscala aurantia Bouchet & Warén, 1986
- Cylindriscala distincta (E. A. Smith, 1891)
- Cylindriscala elata (Suter, 1917) †
- Cylindriscala enamelis (Nakayama, 1995)
- Cylindriscala guernei (Dautzenberg & de Boury, 1897)
- Cylindriscala humerosa (Schepman, 1909)
- Cylindriscala jeffreysi (Tryon, 1887)
- Cylindriscala kaiparaensis (Laws, 1944) †
- Cylindriscala lawsi P. A. Maxwell, 1992 †
- Cylindriscala lirulata (Thiele, 1925)
- Cylindriscala mirifica (P. Fischer in Filhol, 1886)
- Cylindriscala nitida (Kuroda & Ito, 1961)
- Cylindriscala orientalis (Thiele, 1925)
- Cylindriscala paradoxa Garcia, 2003
- Cylindriscala rosenbergi Garcia, 2005
- Cylindriscala sibogae (Schepman, 1909)
- Cylindriscala solar (Nakayama, 1995)
- Cylindriscala suteri P. A. Maxwell, 1992 †
- Cylindriscala thalassae Bouchet & Warén, 1986
- Cylindriscala tortilis (R. B. Watson, 1883)
- Cylindriscala turrita (Nakayama, 1995)
- Cylindriscala vicina (Dautzenberg & de Boury, 1897)

Species brought into synonymy

- Cylindriscala fulgens (de Boury, 1909) : synonym of Cylindriscala acus (R. B. Watson, 1883)
- Cylindriscala funiculata (R. B. Watson, 1883) : synonym of Punctiscala watsoni (de Boury, 1911)
- Cylindriscala grimaldii (Dautzenberg & de Boury, 1897) : synonym of Cylindriscala jeffreysi (Tryon, 1887)
- Cylindriscala solidula (Monterosato, 1875) : synonym of Cylindriscala acus (R. B. Watson, 1883)
- Cylindriscala watsoni (de Boury, 1911) : synonym of Punctiscala watsoni (de Boury, 1911)
