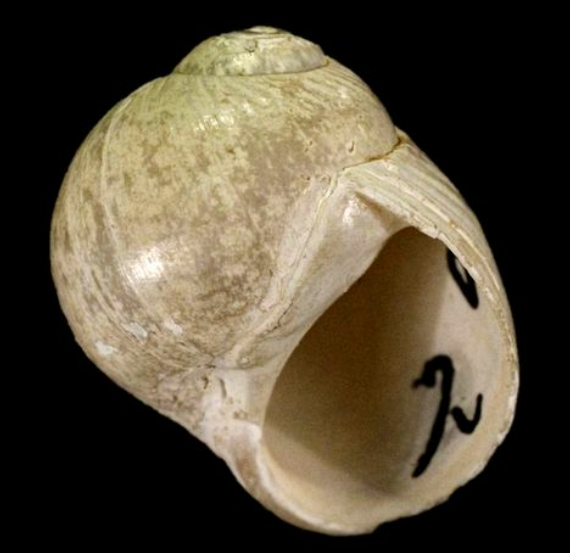
- Shell of Amauropsis apora (specimen at theNaturalis Biodiversity Center)

Scientific classification
- Kingdom: Animalia
- Phylum: Mollusca
- Class: Gastropoda
- Subclass: Caenogastropoda
- Order: Littorinimorpha
- Family: Naticidae
- Genus: Amauropsis
- Species: A. apora

Binomial name
- Amauropsis apora (R. B. Watson, 1881)

Synonyms
- Natica apora R. B. Watson, 1881 superseded combination

= Amauropsis apora =

Species of gastropod

Amauropsis apora is a species of predatory sea snail, a marine gastropod mollusk in the family Naticidae, the moon snails.

== Description ==
The length of the shell attains 14.5 mm, its diameter 11.4 mm.

The shell is conically globose, slightly pointed at the base, with a prominent apex and a very shallowly impressed suture. It is smooth to the touch but not glossy, and its general coloration is buff with a white columellar lip. The umbilicus is entirely closed.

The longitudinal sculpture is close-set, regular, hair-like growth lines dominate the surface. Near the suture, particularly on the upper whorls, these lines form radiating puckers, giving the shell a distinctive texture. The spirals are subtle and nearly obsolete furrows and lines appear sporadically, becoming slightly stronger and more regular on the basal surface.

The exterior presents a ruddy yellowish tone from the epidermis, which, beneath, overlays a porcelain-like white shell. The epidermis is thin, finely fibrous, and persistent.

The spire is relatively high and conical, with its outline remaining uninterrupted by the gentle rounding of the whorls and the shallow sinking of the sutural lines. The apex is large but somewhat eroded, with the extreme tip often effaced.

There are five whorls, only slightly rounded. Though flattened, they show no constriction beneath the suture. The suture itself is oblique, barely impressed, and subtly channeled.

The aperture is oblique when viewed from the front-back axis but remains linear when aligned with the shell’s axis. It has a pointed, slightly narrowed top and a fully rounded base. A considerable pad fills the upper corner of the aperture, which constitutes more than four-fifths of the total shell height.

The aperture is slightly contracted at the top and moderately closed below, rendering it small for the shell's overall size. The outer lip exhibits a slight flattening above, transitioning into a smooth, rounded curve below. The inner lip is faintly concave, with the substantial pad extending widely and thinly across the body, entirely covering the umbilicus and leaving only a narrow chink. Below, the pad narrows gradually toward the columella. The columella is slightly thickened and bevelled into a narrow, rounded edge that continues seamlessly around the base to join the outer lip.

== Distribution ==
This marine species occurs off the Aru Islands, Indonesia.
