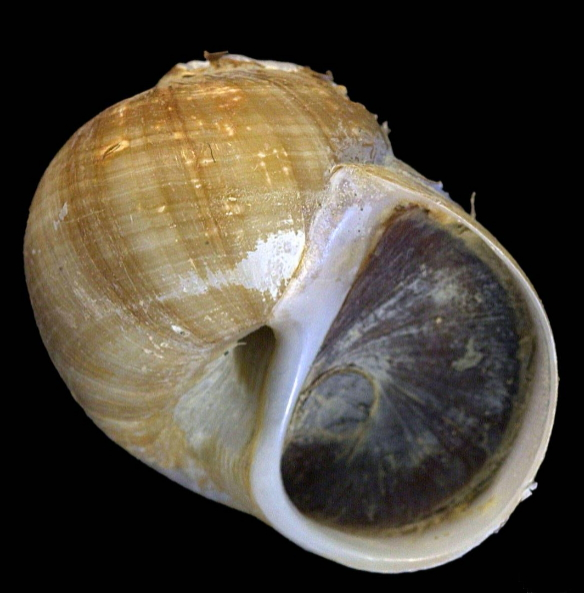
- Shell of Amauropsis powelli (specimen at the National Museum of Natural History, Smithsonian Institution)

Scientific classification
- Kingdom: Animalia
- Phylum: Mollusca
- Class: Gastropoda
- Subclass: Caenogastropoda
- Order: Littorinimorpha
- Family: Naticidae
- Genus: Amauropsis
- Species: A. powelli

Binomial name
- Amauropsis powelli Dell, 1990

= Amauropsis powelli =

Species of gastropod

Amauropsis powelli is a species of predatory sea snail, a marine gastropod mollusk in the family Naticidae, the moon snails.

== Distribution ==
This marine species occurs off South Georgia and the South Sandwich Islands in the South Atlantic Ocean.
