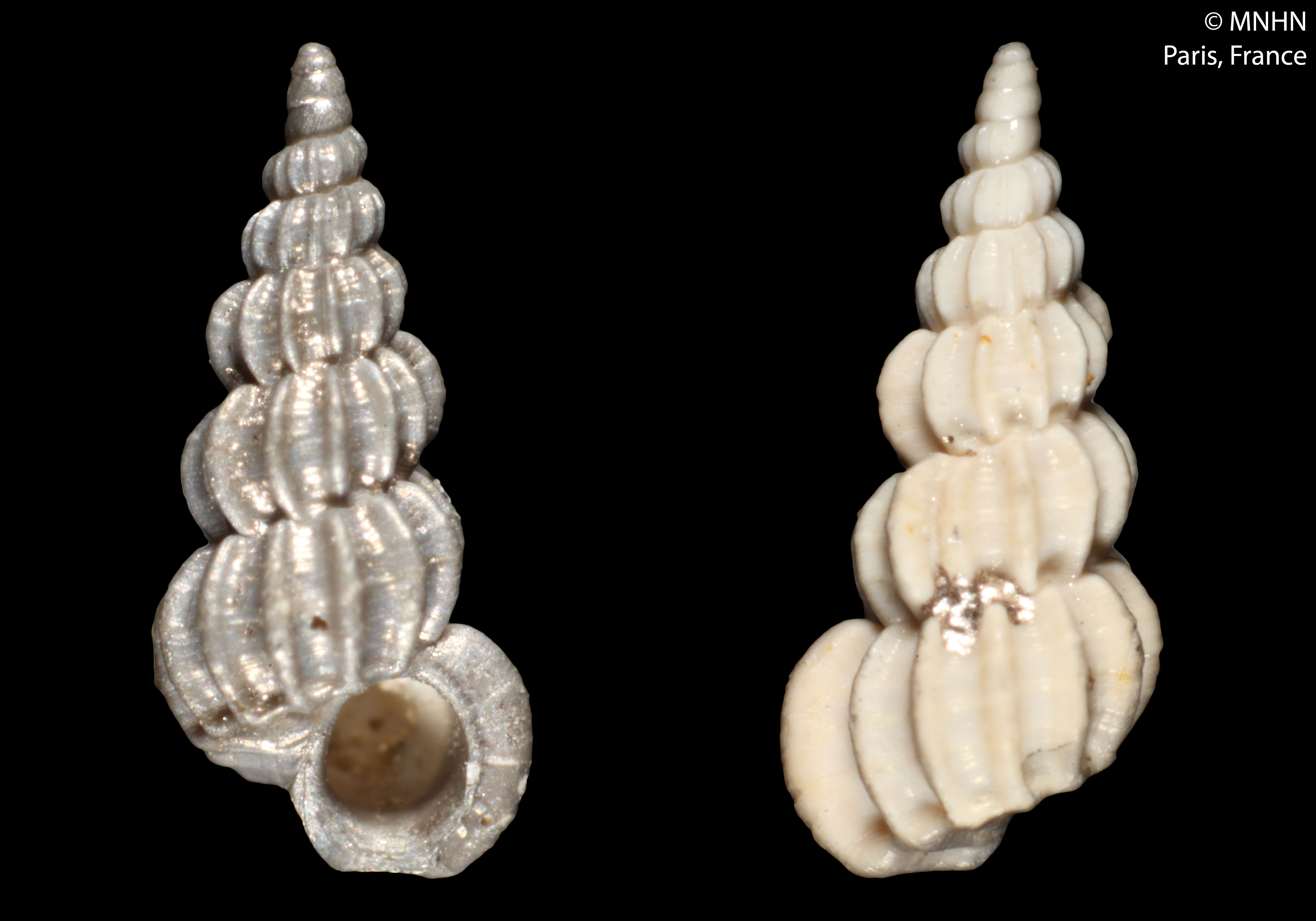
- Shell of † Turriscala germanica (holotype at MNHN, Paris)

Scientific classification
- Kingdom: Animalia
- Phylum: Mollusca
- Class: Gastropoda
- Subclass: Caenogastropoda
- Order: incertae sedis
- Superfamily: Epitonioidea
- Family: Epitoniidae
- Genus: †Turriscala de Boury, 1890

Synonyms
- Turriscala (Kapua) Marwick, 1931 · alternate representation

= Turriscala =

Extinct genus of gastropods

Turriscala is an extinct genus of small to medium-sized pelagic or planktonic sea snails, marine gastropod molluscs in the family Epitoniidae.

== Species ==
- † Turriscala cylindrella (Suter, 1917)
- † Turriscala discors (P. A. Maxwell, 1988)
- † Turriscala finlayi P. A. Maxwell, 1992
- † Turriscala germanica Lozouet, 1999
- † Turriscala kaiparaensis Laws, 1939
- † Turriscala powelli Marwick, 1931
- † Turriscala torulosa (Brocchi, 1814)
