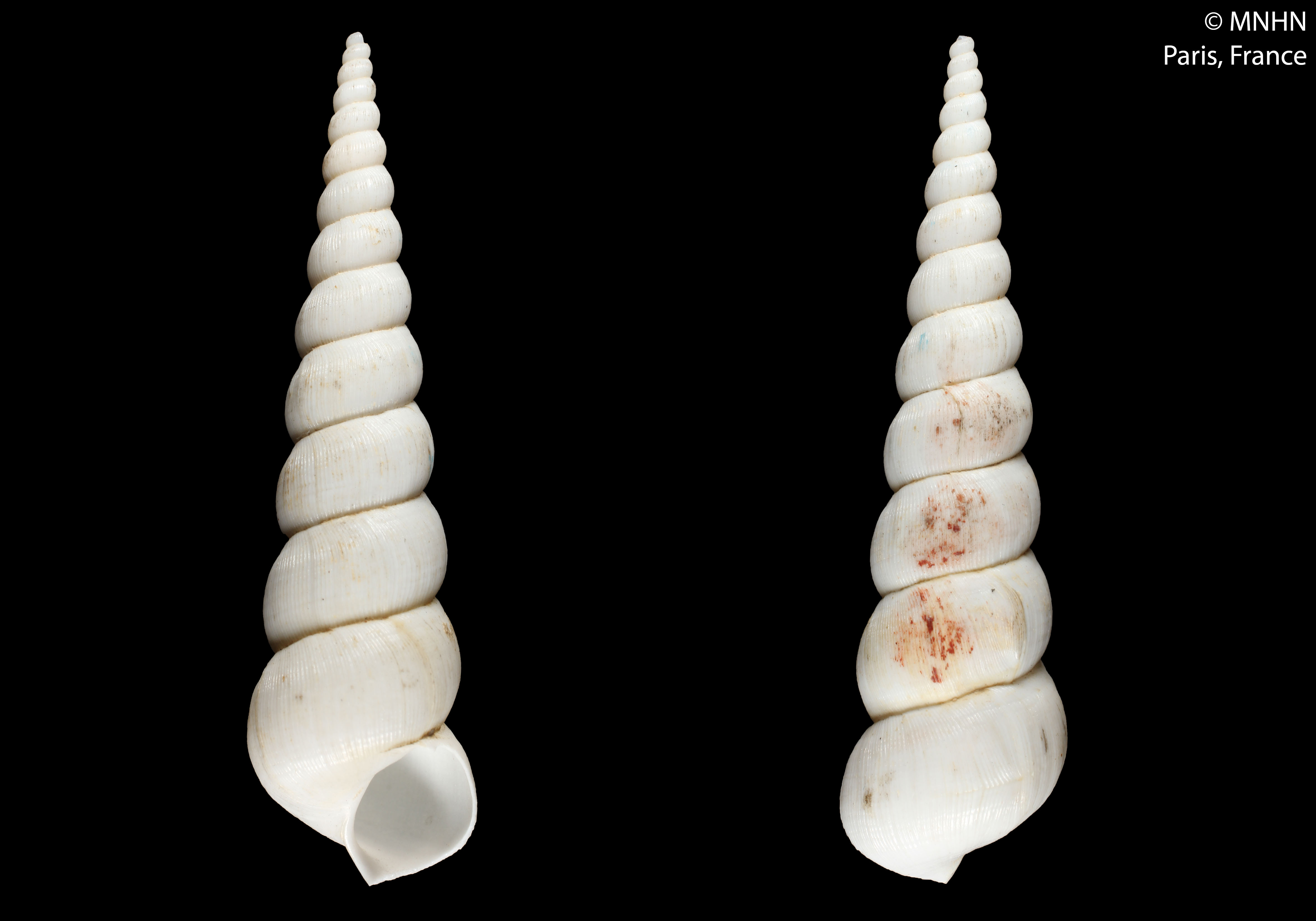
- Shell of Periapta polygyrella (holotype at MNHN, Paris)

Scientific classification
- Kingdom: Animalia
- Phylum: Mollusca
- Class: Gastropoda
- Subclass: Caenogastropoda
- Order: incertae sedis
- Superfamily: Epitonioidea
- Family: Epitoniidae
- Genus: Periapta; Bouchet & Warén, 1986

Type species
- Scalaria polygyrella Fischer P. in Locard, 1897

= Periapta =

Genus of sea snails

Periapta is a genus of small sea snails, marine gastropod mollusks in the family Epitoniidae, commonly known as wentletraps.

== Species ==
- Periapta gracilis (Verrill, 1880)
- Periapta polygyrella (P. Fischer in Locard, 1897)
- Periapta siapnoi (DuShane, 1977)
- Periapta weili García, 2003
