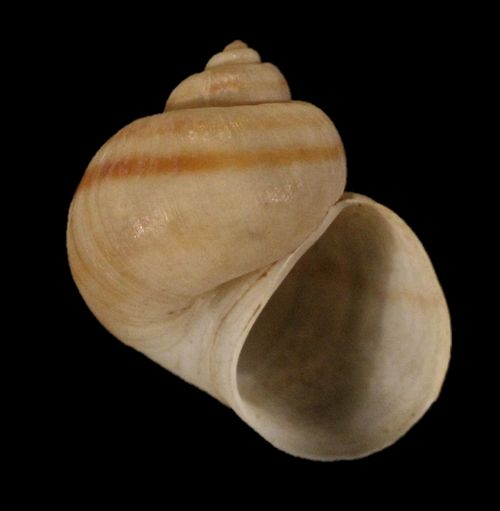
- Shell of Alexania inazawai

Scientific classification
- Kingdom: Animalia
- Phylum: Mollusca
- Class: Gastropoda
- Subclass: Caenogastropoda
- Order: incertae sedis
- Family: Epitoniidae
- Genus: Alexania; Strand, 1928

Type species
- Alexandria natalensis Tomlin, 1926

Species
- See text
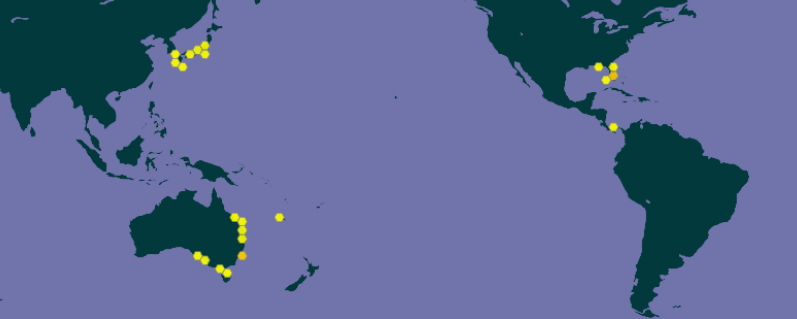

Synonyms
- Alexandria Tomlin, 1926 (nvalid: junior homonym of Alexandria Pfeffer, 1881 [Echinodermata]; Alexania and Tomlinula are replacement names); Habea Kuroda, 1943 (uncertain synonym); Stenacme Pilsbry, 1945 junior subjective synonym; Problitora Wenz, 1939 (uncertain synonym); Tomlinula Strand, 1932 junior subjective synonym

= Alexania (gastropod) =

Genus of gastropods

Alexania is a genus of predatory sea snails, marine prosobranch gastropod mollusks in the family Epitoniidae, commonly known as wentletraps.

== Distribution ==
Species of this genus occurs in the Indo-West Pacific; also off Australia and South Africa.

== Species ==
According to the World Register of Marine Species, the following species with valid names are included within the genus Alexania :

- Alexania callizona (Habe, 1961)
- Alexania floridana (Pilsbry, 1945)
- Alexania globula (Angas, 1880)
- Alexania inazawai (Kuroda, 1943)
- Alexania moerchi (A. Adams & Angas, 1864)
- Alexania natalensis (Tomlin, 1926)
