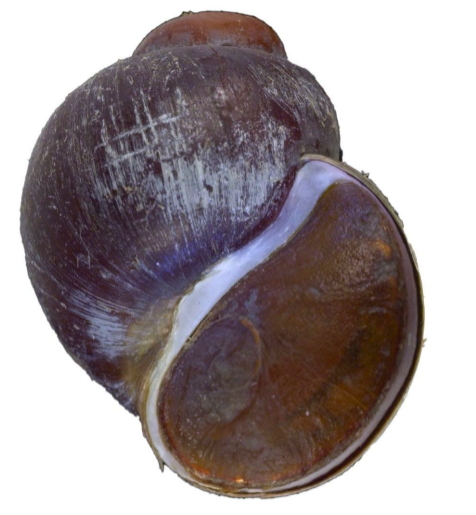
- Shell of Amauropsis rossiana (specimen at the National Museum of Natural History, Smithsonian Institution)

Scientific classification
- Kingdom: Animalia
- Phylum: Mollusca
- Class: Gastropoda
- Subclass: Caenogastropoda
- Order: Littorinimorpha
- Family: Naticidae
- Genus: Amauropsis
- Species: A. rossiana

Binomial name
- Amauropsis rossiana Smith, 1907

Synonyms
- Amauropsis (Amauropsis) rossiana E.A. Smith, 1907 superseded combination

= Amauropsis rossiana =

Species of gastropod

Amauropsis rossiana is a species of predatory sea snail, a marine gastropod mollusk in the family Naticidae, the moon snails.

== Description ==
The length of the shell attains 29 mm, its diameter 25 mm.

(Original description) The shell is globose, imperforate, and relatively thin, covered with a brownish-olive periostracum. Its surface features fine oblique growth lines, numerous faint spiral striations, and distinct oblique malleations on the body whorl and the penultimate whorl. The spire is moderately raised but eroded at the apex. There are approximately five whorls, though only the last two to three remain intact; these are very convex and separated by a distinctly deep suture.

The aperture is obliquely semicircular, bluish-white internally, and occupies nearly two-thirds of the shell’s total length. The columella is oblique, relatively straight in its upper part, curving anteriorly to merge with the lower margin. It is coated with a well-defined white callus that is thickened and reflexed, effectively covering the umbilical region.

== Distribution ==
This marine species occurs in the Weddell Sea off Antarctica.
