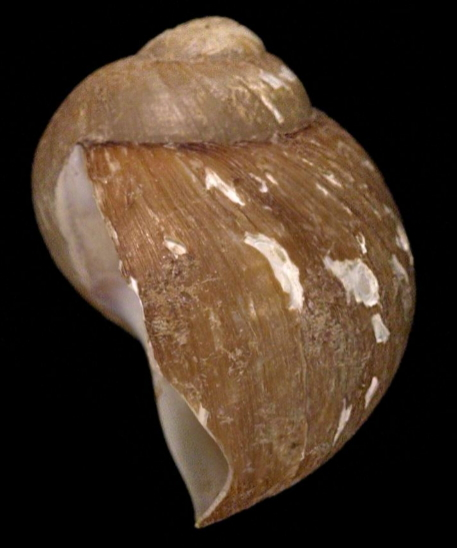
- Shell of Amauropsis prasina (specimen at the National Museum of Natural History, Smithsonian Institution)

Scientific classification
- Kingdom: Animalia
- Phylum: Mollusca
- Class: Gastropoda
- Subclass: Caenogastropoda
- Order: Littorinimorpha
- Family: Naticidae
- Genus: Amauropsis
- Species: A. prasina

Binomial name
- Amauropsis prasina (Watson, 1881)

Synonyms
- Natica prasina R. B. Watson, 1881 superseded combination

= Amauropsis prasina =

Species of gastropod

Amauropsis prasina is a species of predatory sea snail, a marine gastropod mollusk in the family Naticidae, the moon snails.

== Description ==
The length of shell attains 16.25 mm, its diameter 13.49 mm.

(Original description) The shell is conically globose with a relatively high spire and a fully closed umbilicus. It is thin and covered by a pale green, slightly rough epidermis.

The growth lines in the longitudinal sculpture exhibit slight puckering of the fibrous epidermis, giving the surface texture. The surface of the spiral sculpture displays faint, open, irregular, and unequal furrowing, accompanied by microscopic scratch-like markings.

The underlying shell is pale buff, visible beneath the dull greenish epidermis, which is fibrous, thin, and persistent but prone to rubbing away.

The spire is moderately high, with whorls ascending conspicuously in pronounced, rounded steps. The apex is unusually large for the overall shell size, the apex is rounded, but the extreme tip is often recessed and eroded. The shell comprises five whorls, including approximately 1.4 whorls in the protoconch. These are globose, uniformly increasing in size, and exhibit slow, regular expansion. The suture is deep, very slightly channeled, and straight for most of its length, becoming slightly oblique towards the end.

The aperture is large, open, circular-oval in shape, only slightly oblique, and has a right-angled apex with a fully rounded base. Its height constitutes nearly seven-ninths of the total shell height. The outer lip emerges at a right angle from the body whorl and curves smoothly and fully to the columella. It is thin and delicate. The inner Lip is slightly hollowed along the body, the inner lip features a minimal projection. A very thin callus coats the inner surface, with only a slight pad present at the upper corner of the aperture. Around the umbilicus, the callus is slightly and broadly reverted, effectively sealing the opening or leaving just a narrow chink. At the columella, the lip narrows, with a subtle transverse angulation present. This area is only lightly thickened, featuring a rounded, slightly flattened edge.

The operculum is thin and membranaceous, featuring a distinct, slightly impressed suture. Its surface is adorned with sharp, radiating lines that enhance its delicate structure.

== Distribution ==
This marine species occurs off Kerguelen and the Crozet Islands in the sub-Antarctic.
