= Amauropsis notoleptos =

Scientific classification
- Kingdom: Animalia
- Phylum: Mollusca
- Class: Gastropoda
- Subclass: Caenogastropoda
- Order: Littorinimorpha
- Family: Naticidae
- Genus: Amauropsis
- Species: †A. notoleptos

Binomial name
- †Amauropsis notoleptos Stilwell, Zinsmeister & Oleinik, 2004

Species of gastropod

Amauropsis notoleptos is an extinct species of predatory sea snail, a marine gastropod mollusk in the family Naticidae, the moon snails.

== Distribution ==
Fossils of this species have been found in Paleocene strata on Seymour Island off Antarctica.
