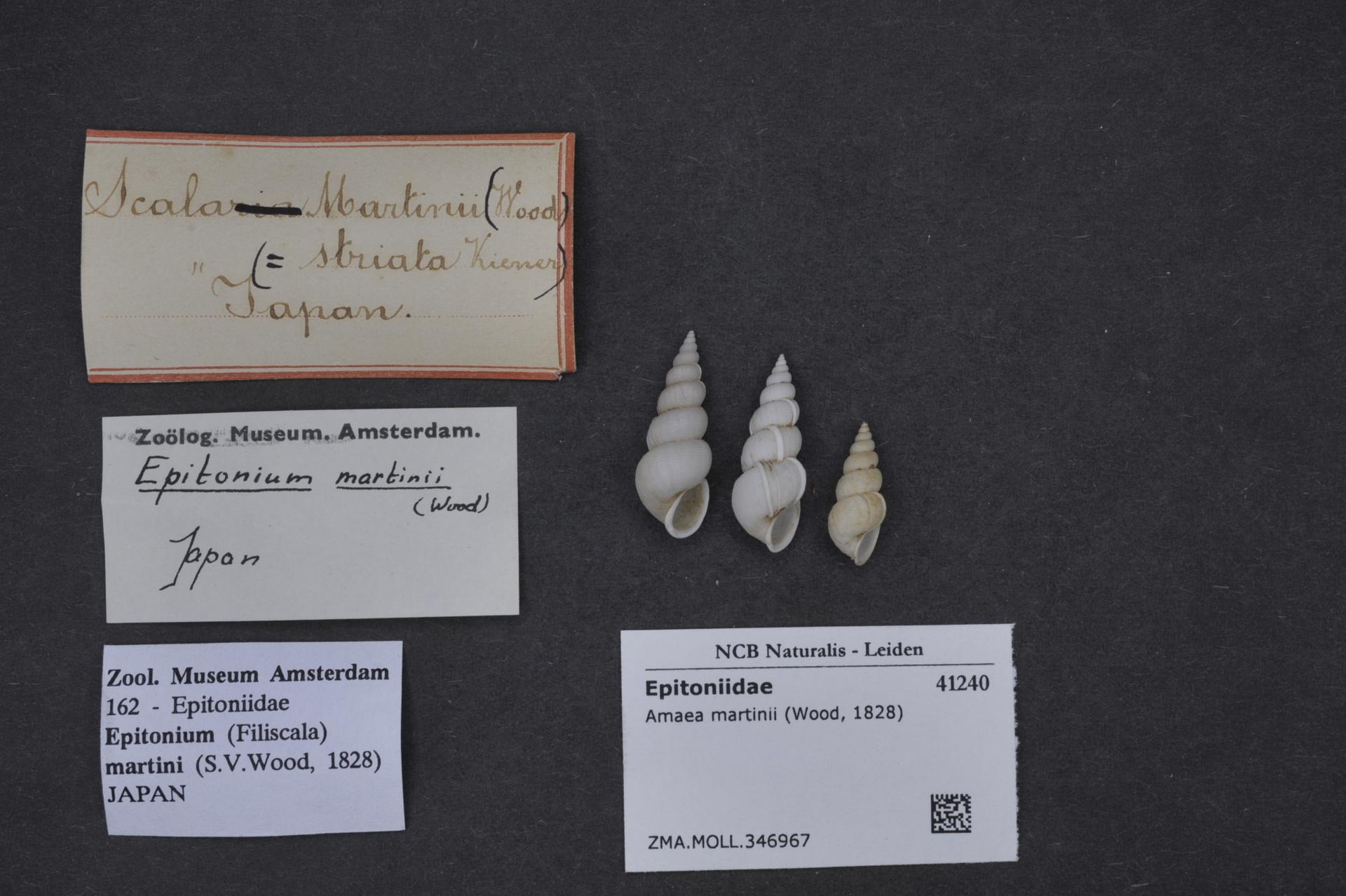
- Shell of Filiscala raricosta (specimen at Naturalis Biodiversity Center)

Scientific classification
- Kingdom: Animalia
- Phylum: Mollusca
- Class: Gastropoda
- Subclass: Caenogastropoda
- Order: incertae sedis
- Family: Epitoniidae
- Genus: Filiscala de Boury, 1911

Type species
- Turbo martinii W. Wood, 1828

Species
- See text.

= Filiscala =

Genus of gastropods

Filiscala is a genus of small sea snails, marine gastropod molluscs in the family Epitoniidae, commonly known as wentletraps.

== Species ==
Species within the genus Filiscala include:

- Filiscala raricosta (Lamarck, 1804)
- Filiscala youngi (Kilburn, 1985)

Species brought into synonymy

- Filiscala martinii (W. Wood, 1828): synonym of Filiscala raricosta (Lamarck, 1804)
