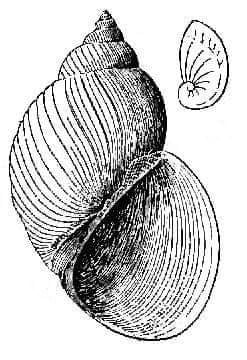
- Shell of Alexania moerchi

Scientific classification
- Kingdom: Animalia
- Phylum: Mollusca
- Class: Gastropoda
- Subclass: Caenogastropoda
- Order: incertae sedis
- Family: Epitoniidae
- Genus: Alexania
- Species: A. moerchi

Binomial name
- Alexania moerchi (A. Adams & Angas, 1864)

Synonyms
- Amauropsis moerchi A. Adams & Angas, 1864 (original combination); Habea inazawai Kuroda, 1943; Problitora moerchi (A. Adams & Angas, 1864)

= Alexania moerchi =

Species of gastropod

Alexania moerchi is a species of predatory sea snails, marine prosobranch gastropod mollusks in the family Epitoniidae.

== Description ==
(Original description in Latin) The shell is ovate, with an elevated spire and is imperforate. It is covered with an olive-colored epidermis. The apex is very sharp. The shell contains 7 slightly convex whorls, obtusely angled at the sutures. The aperture is ovate. The inner lip is covered with a thin white callus. The columella is slightly reflexed at the front. The outer lip is scarcely angled at the back and has a sharp edge.

== Distribution ==
This marine species occurs off Australia (New South Wales, Queensland) and Japan.
