= Variciscala =

Scientific classification
- Kingdom: Animalia
- Phylum: Mollusca
- Class: Gastropoda
- Subclass: Caenogastropoda
- Order: incertae sedis
- Family: Epitoniidae
- Genus: Variciscala de Boury, 1909

Type species
- Scalaria raricosta Lamarck, 1804

Species
- See text

Genus of gastropods

Variciscala is a genus of small sea snails, marine gastropod molluscs in the family Epitoniidae, commonly known as wentletraps.

== Species ==
Species within the genus Variciscala include:

- Variciscala raricostata (G. B. Sowerby II, 1844)

Species brought into synonymy

- Variciscala kelea (Iredale, 1930): synonym of Variciscala raricostata (G. B. Sowerby II, 1844)
- Variciscala martinii (W. Wood, 1828): synonym of Filiscala martinii (W. Wood, 1828), synonym of Filiscala raricosta (Lamarck, 1804)
- Variciscala reticulata (Lee & Wu, 1998): synonym of Epitonium reticulatum Lee & Wu, 1998
