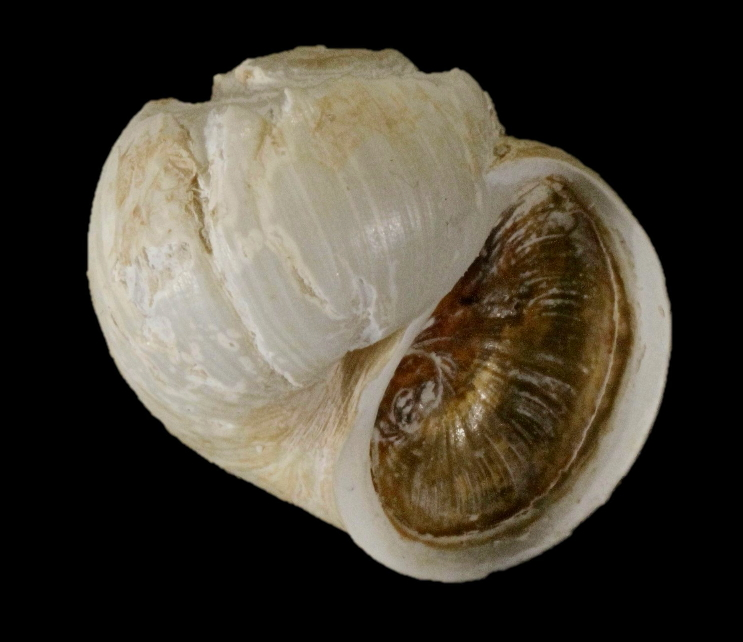
- Shell of Amauropsis sphaeroides (specimen at Naturalis Biodiversity Center)

Scientific classification
- Kingdom: Animalia
- Phylum: Mollusca
- Class: Gastropoda
- Subclass: Caenogastropoda
- Order: Littorinimorpha
- Family: Naticidae
- Genus: Amauropsis
- Species: A. sphaeroides

Binomial name
- Amauropsis sphaeroides (Jeffreys, 1877)

Synonyms
- Natica sphaeroides Jeffreys, 1877 (original combination)

= Amauropsis sphaeroides =

Species of gastropod

Amauropsis sphaeroides is a species of predatory sea snail, a marine gastropod mollusk in the family Naticidae, the moon snails.

== Description ==
The maximum recorded shell length is 15 mm.

== Distribution ==
This marine species occurs south of Greenland.

== Habitat ==
Minimum recorded depth is 3185 m. Maximum recorded depth is 4166 m.
