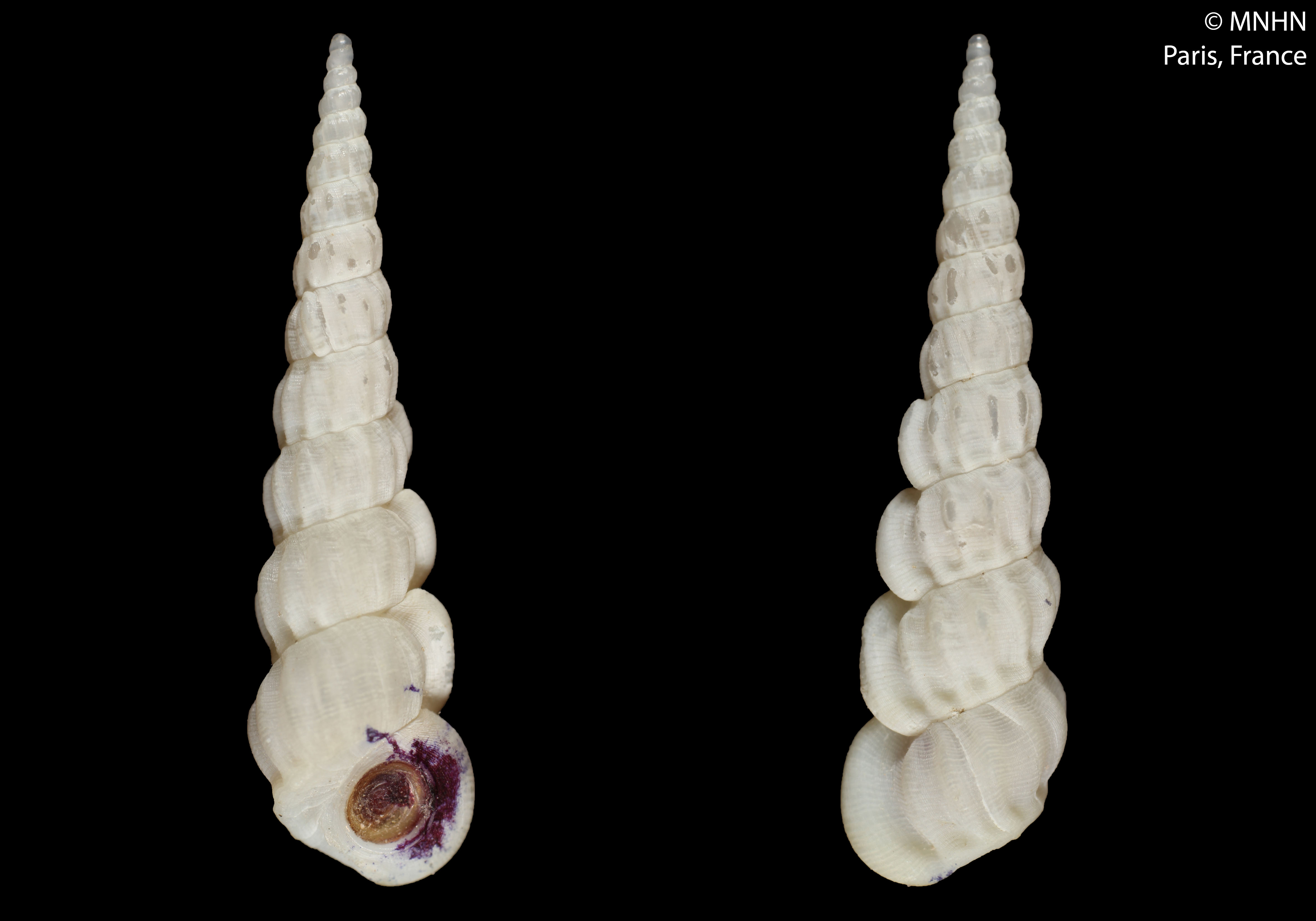
- Shell of Gregorioiscala barazeri (holotype at MNHN, Paris)

Scientific classification
- Kingdom: Animalia
- Phylum: Mollusca
- Class: Gastropoda
- Subclass: Caenogastropoda
- Order: incertae sedis
- Superfamily: Epitonioidea
- Family: Epitoniidae
- Genus: Gregorioiscala; Cossmann, 1912

Type species
- † Scalaria (Bria) romettensis de Gregorio, 1889

Synonyms
- Compressiscala Masahito & Habe, 1976; Gregoriiscala [sic] (original misspelling); Gregorioscala [sic] (misspelling); Punctiscala (Gregorioiscala) Cossmann, 1912 (original rank); † Scalaria (Bria) de Gregorio, 1889 (invalid: junior homonym of Bria Giebel, 1856 [Diptera]; Gregorioiscala is a replacement name)

= Gregorioiscala =

Genus of gastropods

Gregorioiscala is a genus of sea snails, marine gastropod molluscs in the family Epitoniidae, commonly known as wentletraps.

== General characteristics ==
(Original description in French) The shell is very thick. It is of medium size and has a turriculate, generally slightly curved shape. The spire is long, stepped, and sharply pointed at the summit. The whorls are very convex in their middle part and excavated behind, and they are separated by linear sutures that are slightly bordered below and framed by two ramps that give the spire its tiered appearance. The ornamentation consists of fairly numerous, straight axial folds, which fade out on the posterior ramp and likewise do not reach the anterior suture. These folds are crossed by very fine striae that are scarcely visible when the shell is worn. Beginning about the fourth whorl before the last, a very large varix appears; it is continuous from one suture to the other, even overlapping the sutures, and at each successive whorl it advances by an amount equal to its own width, up to the outer lip, which completes this series of successive “steps”.

The body whorl is a little less than one‑third of the total height. It is ornamented like the rest of the spire and is bounded at the periphery of the base by a large, bluntly crenellated cord. The base is narrow, imperforate at the centre, only slightly convex, finely striated, and faintly radiate with growth lines of the shell. A small, keeled ridge connects on one side to the peristome and on the other side to the terminal projection of the varix of the outer lip, and the peripheral cord also runs into this point.

The aperture is circular, with a very thick, doubled peristome. The inner layer is fairly narrow and cylindrical, nowhere flaring, except for a small callous portion on the parietal region. The outer layer is discontinuous and varicose over the extent of the outer lip, which is vertical.

== Species ==
Species within the genus Gregorioiscala include:

- † Gregorioiscala abrupta (De Cristofori & Jan, 1832)
- Gregorioiscala annectens (Powell, 1951)
- † Gregorioiscala ascialis Harzhauser & Landau, 2025
- Gregorioiscala barazeri Garcia, 2004
- Gregorioiscala crosnieri Garcia, 2004
- Gregorioiscala exfoliata Bouchet & Warén, 1986
- Gregorioiscala federicoi Bonfitto, 2020
- Gregorioiscala fredericqae Garcia, 2004
- † Gregorioiscala huttoni P. A. Maxwell, 1992
- Gregorioiscala japonica (Masahito & Habe, 1976)
- Gregorioiscala levismaculosa Garcia, 2004
- Gregorioiscala nevillei Garcia, 2003
- Gregorioiscala nierstraszi (Schepman, 1909)
- Gregorioiscala pachya (Locard, 1897)
- Gregorioiscala pimentai S. Lima & Christoffersen, 2014
- Gregorioiscala polii Cossignani, 2020
- Gregorioiscala sarsii (Kobelt, 1903)
- Gregorioiscala transkeiana (Kilburn, 1985)
- Gregorioiscala unilateralis (Martens, 1902)
- Gregorioiscala xanthotaenia Garcia, 2004

Species brought into synonymy

- Gregorioiscala burchorum (DuShane, 1988): synonym of Opalia burchorum DuShane, 1988
- Gregorioiscala pimentai S. Lima, Christoffersen, Barros & Folly, 2012: synonym of Gregorioiscala pimentai S. Lima & Christoffersen, 2014 (unavailable name)
