= Opalia maxwelli =

Scientific classification
- Kingdom: Animalia
- Phylum: Mollusca
- Class: Gastropoda
- Subclass: Caenogastropoda
- Order: incertae sedis
- Family: Epitoniidae
- Genus: Opalia
- Species: O. maxwelli

Binomial name
- Opalia maxwelli (Finlay, 1930)

Synonyms
- Funiscala maxwelli H. J. Finlay, 1930

Species of gastropod

Opalia maxwelli is a species of small sea snail, a marine gastropod mollusk in the family Epitoniidae, the wentletraps.

== Distribution ==
This species is found in New Zealand.
