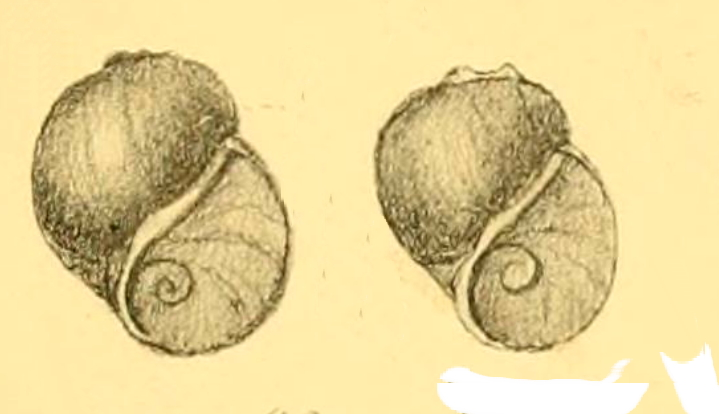
- Two shells of Amauropsis georgiana

Scientific classification
- Kingdom: Animalia
- Phylum: Mollusca
- Class: Gastropoda
- Subclass: Caenogastropoda
- Order: Littorinimorpha
- Family: Naticidae
- Genus: Amauropsis
- Species: A. georgiana

Binomial name
- Amauropsis georgiana (Strebel, 1908)

Synonyms
- Natica georgiana Strebel, 1908 (original combination)

= Amauropsis georgiana =

Species of gastropod

Amauropsis georgiana is a species of predatory sea snail, a marine gastropod mollusc in the family Naticidae, the moon snails.

== Description ==
The length of the shell attains 6.2 mm, its diameter 4.5 mm.

(Original description in German) The two available specimens are likely immature, but they exhibit such distinctive differences from the other species that the establishment of a new species seems justified. The uppermost whorls are eroded or ground down, with evidence suggesting there were originally three. The shape is very tall relative to its width.

The shell is covered with a yellow-brown cuticle, and the umbilicus is concealed. The whorls are rounded, with the body whorl being slightly compressed laterally. The aperture and umbilical region are sufficiently illustrated in the provided figure. The operculum behaves as in Amauropsis anderssoni—that is, the spiral expands gradually, and there is no calcareous coating present.

== Distribution ==
This marine species occurs in the South Atlantic Ocean and off the South Georgia and the South Sandwich islands; a fossil has been found in Jurassic strata in Charente-Maritime, France.
