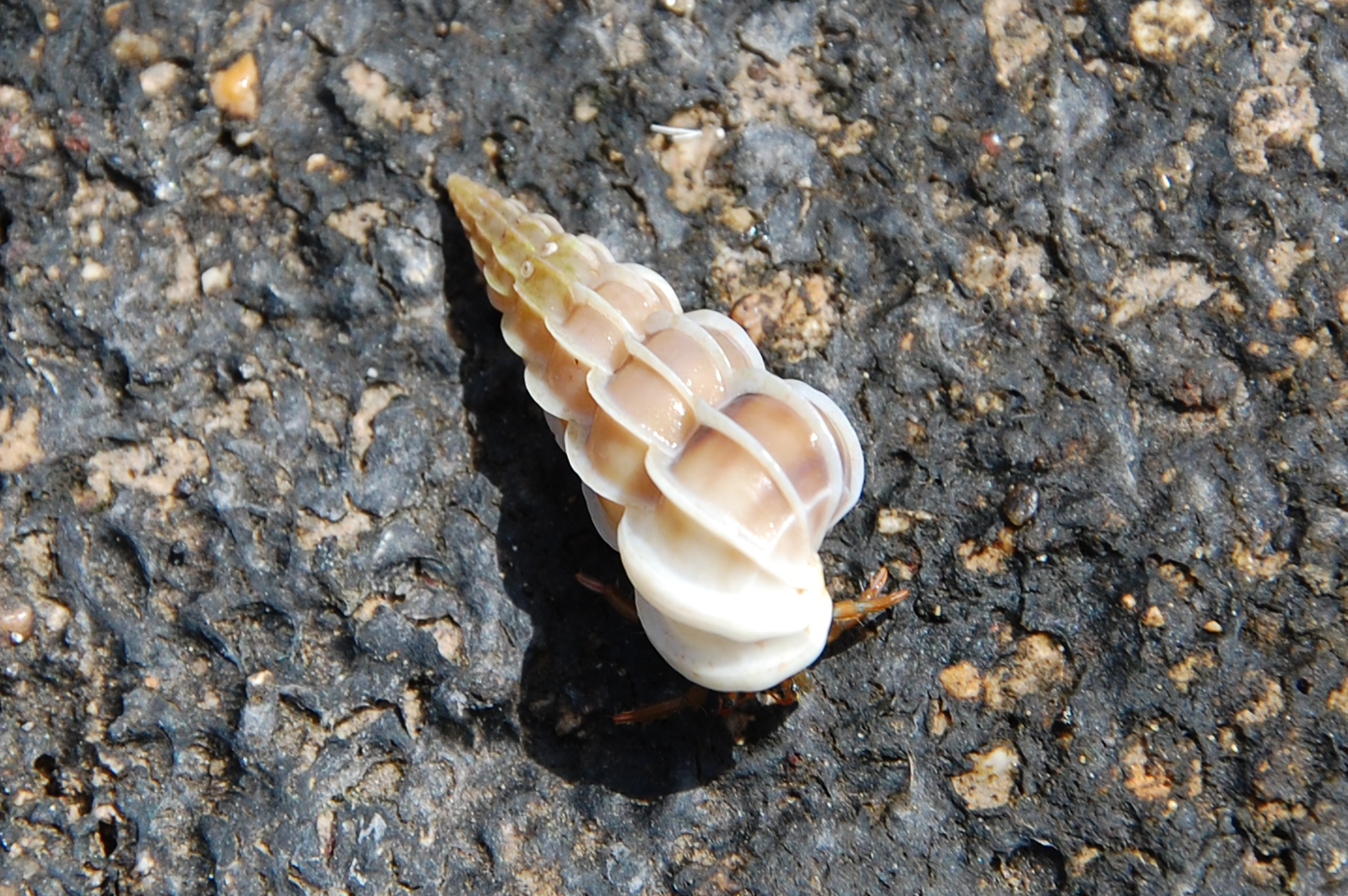
- Gyroscala lamellosa

Scientific classification
- Kingdom: Animalia
- Phylum: Mollusca
- Class: Gastropoda
- Subclass: Caenogastropoda
- Order: incertae sedis
- Family: Epitoniidae
- Genus: Gyroscala de Boury, 1887

= Gyroscala =

Genus of gastropods

Gyroscala is a genus of gastropods belonging to the family Epitoniidae.

The genus has almost cosmopolitan distribution.

Species:

- Gyroscala commutata (Monterosato, 1877)
- Gyroscala coronata (Lamarck, 1816)
- Gyroscala mikeleei Garcia, 2003
- Gyroscala punjabensis Eames, 1952
- Gyroscala purpurata (Dall, 1917)
- Gyroscala roberti (Dall, 1917)
- Gyroscala rupicola (Kurtz, 1860)
- Gyroscala statuminata (G.B.Sowerby II, 1844)
- Gyroscala stueri (de Boury, 1890)
- Gyroscala watanabei Nakayama, 2000
- Gyroscala xenicima (Melvill & Standen, 1903)
