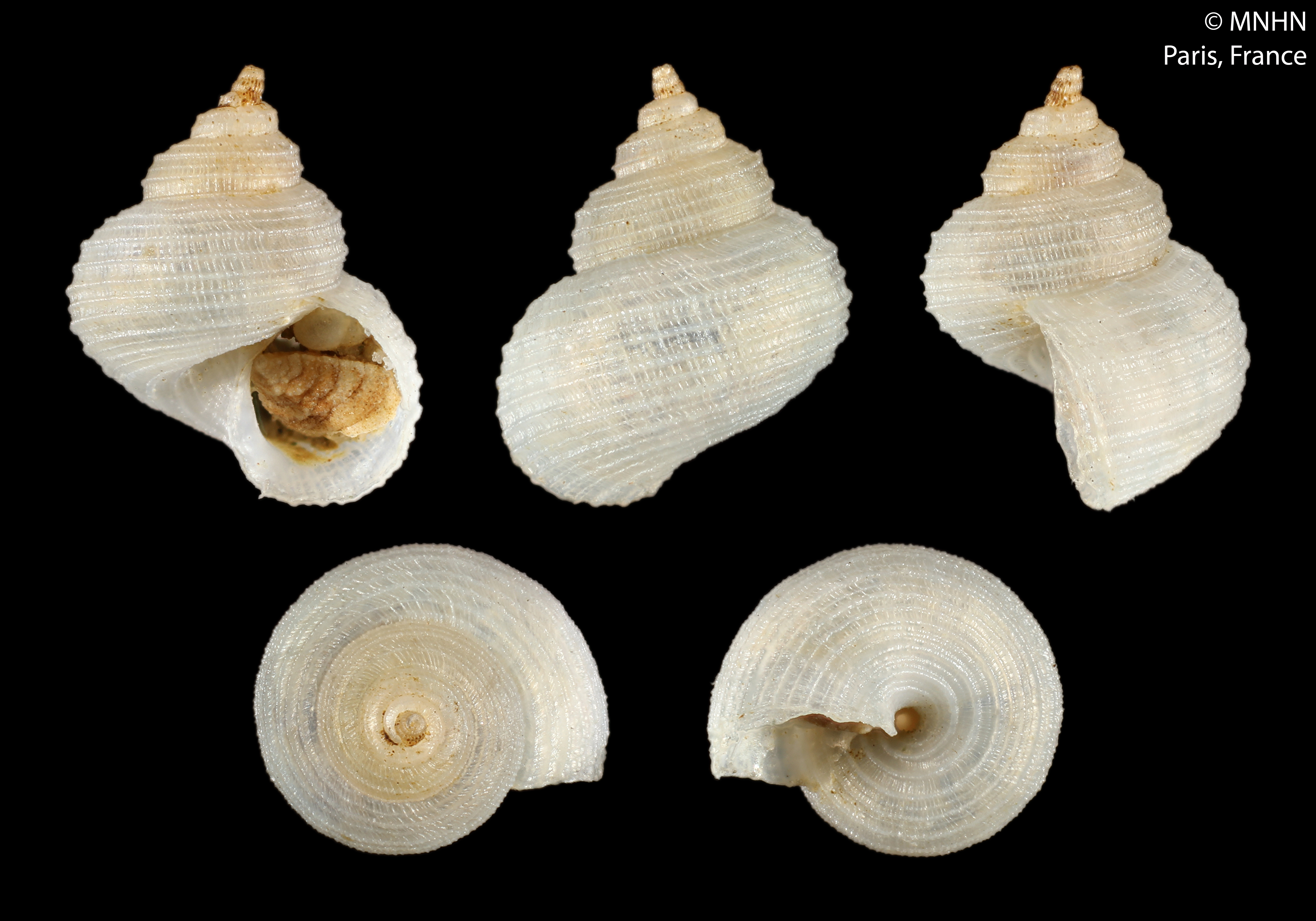
- Shell of Iphitus escondida (specimen at MNHN, Paris)

Scientific classification
- Kingdom: Animalia
- Phylum: Mollusca
- Class: Gastropoda
- Subclass: Caenogastropoda
- Order: incertae sedis
- Superfamily: Epitonioidea
- Family: Epitoniidae
- Genus: Iphitus; Jeffreys, 1883

Type species
- Iphitus tuberatus Jeffreys, 1883

Synonyms
- Iphitella Thiele, 1925 (Unnecessary replacement); Sculptifer Beu & Climo, 1974; Stylotrochus Seguenza, 1876 (Invalid: junior homonym of Stylotrochus Haeckel, 1862)

= Iphitus (gastropod) =

Genus of gastropods

Iphitus is a genus of small sea snails, marine gastropods in the family Epitoniidae of the superfamily Epitonioidea, the wentletraps, the purple snails, and their allies.

== Species ==
Species within the genus Iphitus include:

- Iphitus boucheti Poppe & Tagaro, 2016
- Iphitus cancellatus Dautzenberg & H. Fischer, 1896
- Iphitus clarki L. G. Brown, 2019
- Iphitus escondida Poppe & Tagaro, 2016
- Iphitus neozelanicus (Dell, 1956)
- Iphitus notios Pimenta, Andrade & Absalão, 2018
- Iphitus robertsi Sabelli & Taviani, 1997
- Iphitus tenuisculptus (Seguenza, 1876)
- Iphitus tuberatus Jeffreys, 1883
- Iphitus wareni L. G. Brown, 2019

Species brought into synonymy

- Iphitus marshalli (Sykes, 1925): synonym of Iphitus tenuisculptus (Seguenza, 1876)
- Iphitus reticulatus Dall, 1927: synonym of Iphitus cancellatus Dautzenberg & H. Fischer, 1896
- Iphitus tenerrimus Dautzenberg & Fischer H., 1896: synonym of Alora tenerrima (Dautzenberg & H. Fischer, 1896)
- Iphitus tuberculatus Watson, 1886: synonym of Sansonia tuberculata (Watson, 1886)
