= Boury =

Boury is a surname. Notable people with the surname include:

- Richard Boury (1830-1914), American soldier
- Vincent Boury (born 1969), French table tennis player

== See also ==
- Meanings of minor-planet names: 3001–4000#435
