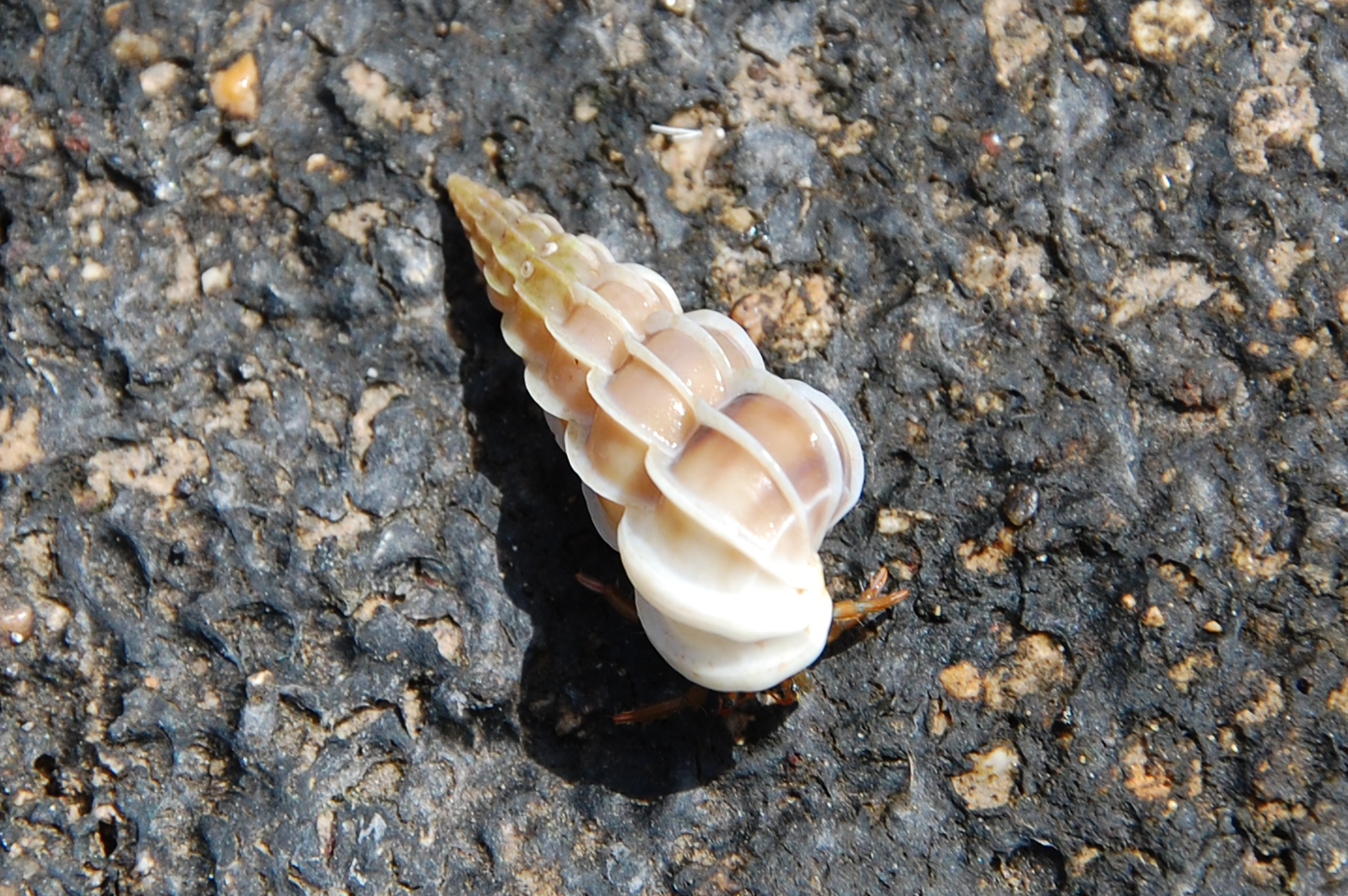

Scientific classification
- Kingdom: Animalia
- Phylum: Mollusca
- Class: Gastropoda
- Subclass: Caenogastropoda
- Order: incertae sedis
- Family: Epitoniidae
- Genus: Gyroscala
- Species: G. lamellosa

Binomial name
- Gyroscala lamellosa (Lamarck, 1822)

Synonyms
- See text

= Gyroscala lamellosa =

Species of gastropod

Gyroscala lamellosa, common name : the lamellose wentletrap, is a species of medium-sized predatory sea snail, a marine gastropod mollusc in the family Epitoniidae, the wentletraps.

== Synonyms ==
In the course of time, this species has been given many names by different authors.

- Cirsotrema perplexa (Pease, 1863)
- Epitonium albocostatum (Turton, 1932)
- Epitonium angustum (Mörch, 1875)
- Epitonium basicum Dall, 1917
- Epitonium consors (Crosse & P. Fischer, 1864)
- Epitonium filare (Mörch, 1875)
- Epitonium perplexum (Pease, 1863)
- Epitonium pyramis Tinker, 1952
- Epitonium rietensis (Turton, 1932)
- Gyroscala angusta (Mörch, 1875)
- Gyroscala commutata (Monterosato, 1877)
- Gyroscala hachijoensis Taki, 1957
- Gyroscala perplexa (Pease, 1863)
- Gyroscala purplexa Taki, 1957
- Gyroscala pyramis (Tinker, 1952)
- Nitidiscala basica (Dall, 1917)
- Opalia consors (Crosse & P. Fischer, 1864)
- Pomiscala perplicata (Iredale, 1929)
- Pomiscala reevesbyi Cotton, 1938
- Scala filaris Mörch, 1875
- Scala perplicata Iredale, 1929
- Scala torquata Fenaux, 1943
- Scalaria albocostata Turton, 1932
- Scalaria candida Monterosato, 1877
- Scalaria clathrus G. B. Sowerby, 1842
- Scalaria commutata Monterosato, 1877
- Scalaria consors Crosse & P. Fischer, 1864
- Scalaria fimbriosa W. Wood, 1842
- Scalaria lamellosa Lamarck, 1822 (basionym)
- Scalaria monocycla Lamarck, 1822
- Scalaria perplexa Pease, 1863
- Scalaria pseudoscalaris Brocchi, 1814
- Scalaria rietensis Turton, 1932
- Scalaria rufanensis Turton, 1932

== Distribution ==
This species has a worldwide distribution in shallow water, from New Zealand and Australia to the Hawaiian Islands; in European waters, the Mediterranean Sea, the Atlantic Ocean (Angola, Cape Verde, West Africa, Macaronesian Islands), the Indian Ocean (Mascarene Basin, Mozambique), Brazil and the Caribbean Sea.

== Description ==
The shell size varies between 9 mm and 40 mm
