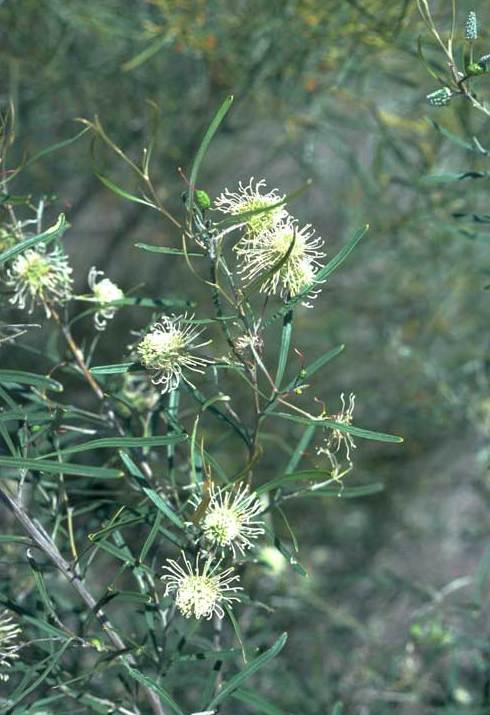
- Near Kalbarri

Conservation status
- Vulnerable (IUCN 3.1)

Scientific classification
- Kingdom: Plantae
- Clade: Embryophytes
- Clade: Tracheophytes
- Clade: Spermatophytes
- Clade: Angiosperms
- Clade: Eudicots
- Order: Proteales
- Family: Proteaceae
- Genus: Grevillea
- Species: G. commutata

Binomial name
- Grevillea commutata F.Muell.

Subspecies
- Grevillea commutata subsp. commutata F.Muell.; Grevillea commutata subsp. pinnatisecta Makinson

= Grevillea commutata =

Species of shrub endemic to Western Australia

Grevillea commutata is a species of flowering plant in the family Proteaceae and is endemic to the west of Western Australia. It is a spreading, open to dense shrub with egg-shaped leaves with the narrower end towards the base, and white, cream-coloured, and pinkish-green flowers.

== Description ==
Grevillea commutata is a spreading, open to dense, multi-stemmed shrub that typically grows to a height of 1–3 m (3 ft 3 in – 9 ft 10 in) and has silky to woolly hairs on the branchlets. Its leaves are usually narrowly to broadly egg-shaped leaves with the narrower end towards the base, 30–120 mm (1.2–4.7 in) long and 2–10 mm (0.079–0.394 in) wide. The leaves are sometimes divided with two to seven linear to narrow egg-shaped lobes 30–60 mm (1.2–2.4 in) long and 1–6 mm (0.039–0.236 in) long. The flowers are arranged in groups on a rachis 8–20 mm (0.31–0.79 in) long, the pistil 10–15 mm (0.39–0.59 in) long and silky-hairy, the style with a green to cream-coloured tip. The fruit is a glabrous follicle 10–14 mm (0.39–0.55 in) long.

== Taxonomy ==
Grevillea commutata was first formally described in 1868 by Ferdinand von Mueller in Fragmenta Phytographiae Australiae from specimens collected by Augustus Oldfield near Gregory. The specific epithet (commutata) means "changed" or "altered", referring to the variable leaf forms.

In 2000, Robert Owen Makinson described two subspecies in the Flora of Australia, and the names are accepted by the Australian Plant Census:

- Grevillea commutata F.Muell. subsp. commutata has mostly narrowly egg-shaped leaves with the narrower end towards the base, and flowers from October to February;
- Grevillea commutata subsp. pinnatisecta Makinson has mostly divided leaves and flowers from June to December.

== Distribution and habitat ==
Grevillea commutata grows in heath or shrubland on sandplains, dunes and coastal breakaways from north of the Murchison River to the Greenough River and inland to Yuna in the Coolgardie, Geraldton Sandplains and Yalgoo biogeographic regions of western Western Australia.

== Conservation status ==
This grevillea and both its subspecies are listed as not threatened by the Department of Biodiversity, Conservation and Attractions. However, on the more recent IUCN Red List assessment, it has been listed as vulnerable. It has an extent of occurrence of less than 20,000 km^{2} (7,700 sq mi) and a severely fragmented population. It is threatened by land clearing and habitat destruction for agriculture and urban development in the city of Geraldton.

== See also ==
- List of Grevillea species
