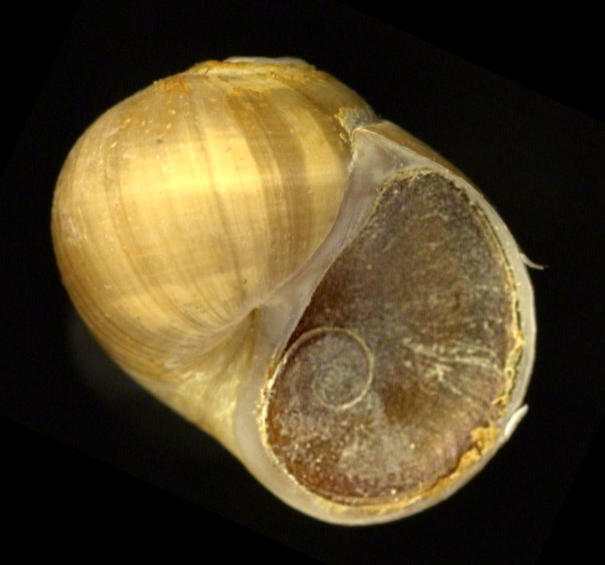
- Shell of Amauropsis anderssoni (specimen at the National Museum of Natural History, Smithsonian Institution)

Scientific classification
- Kingdom: Animalia
- Phylum: Mollusca
- Class: Gastropoda
- Subclass: Caenogastropoda
- Order: Littorinimorpha
- Family: Naticidae
- Genus: Amauropsis
- Species: A. anderssoni

Binomial name
- Amauropsis anderssoni (Strebel, 1906)

Synonyms
- Natica (Neveritia) anderssoni Strebel, 1906 superseded combination; Natica anderssoni Strebel, 1906 superseded combination

= Amauropsis anderssoni =

Species of gastropod

Amauropsis anderssoni is a species of predatory sea snail, a marine gastropod mollusk in the family Naticidae, the moon snails.

== Description ==
The length of the shell attains 14.9 mm, its diameter 15.6 mm.

The shell is thin but robust, featuring a rhomboidal shape with rounded ends. Its surface is white, overlaid by a gray-olive-green cuticle, with darker stripes indicating earlier growth stages.

The apex and upper whorls are uniformly worn down in both young and mature specimens, obscuring the precise number of whorls. The whorls display a clearly compressed zone near the suture, transitioning into a noticeable curvature, which becomes especially pronounced on the final whorl.

On occasion, the columella partially obscures the umbilicus, leaving only a narrow slit visible.

The sculpture is characterized by very fine growth lines interspersed with coarser ones, creating subtle folds along the compressed zone near the suture. The horny operculum is distinct from the other species in this genus, due to its slower spiral development, positioning the nucleus higher and slightly farther from the left margin. While the suture is highlighted by a delicate raised ridge, the exterior lacks calcareous .

The maximum recorded shell length is 22.7 mm.

== Distribution ==
This marine species occurs in the South Atlantic Ocean and off the South Georgia and the South Sandwich islands; in the Scotia Sea, Antarctica.

== Habitat ==
Minimum recorded depth is 15 m. Maximum recorded depth is 567 m.
