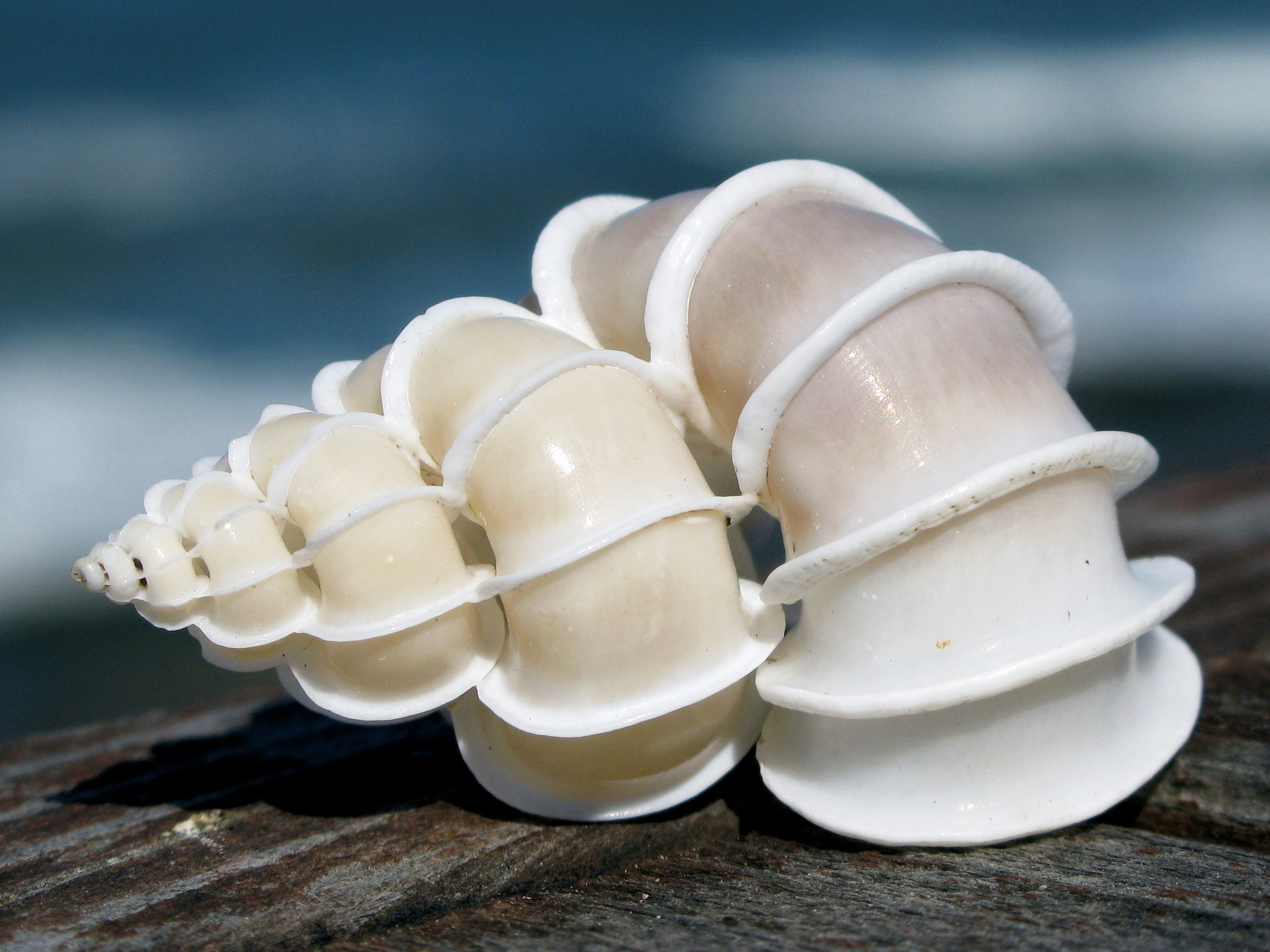
- A shell of Epitonium scalare
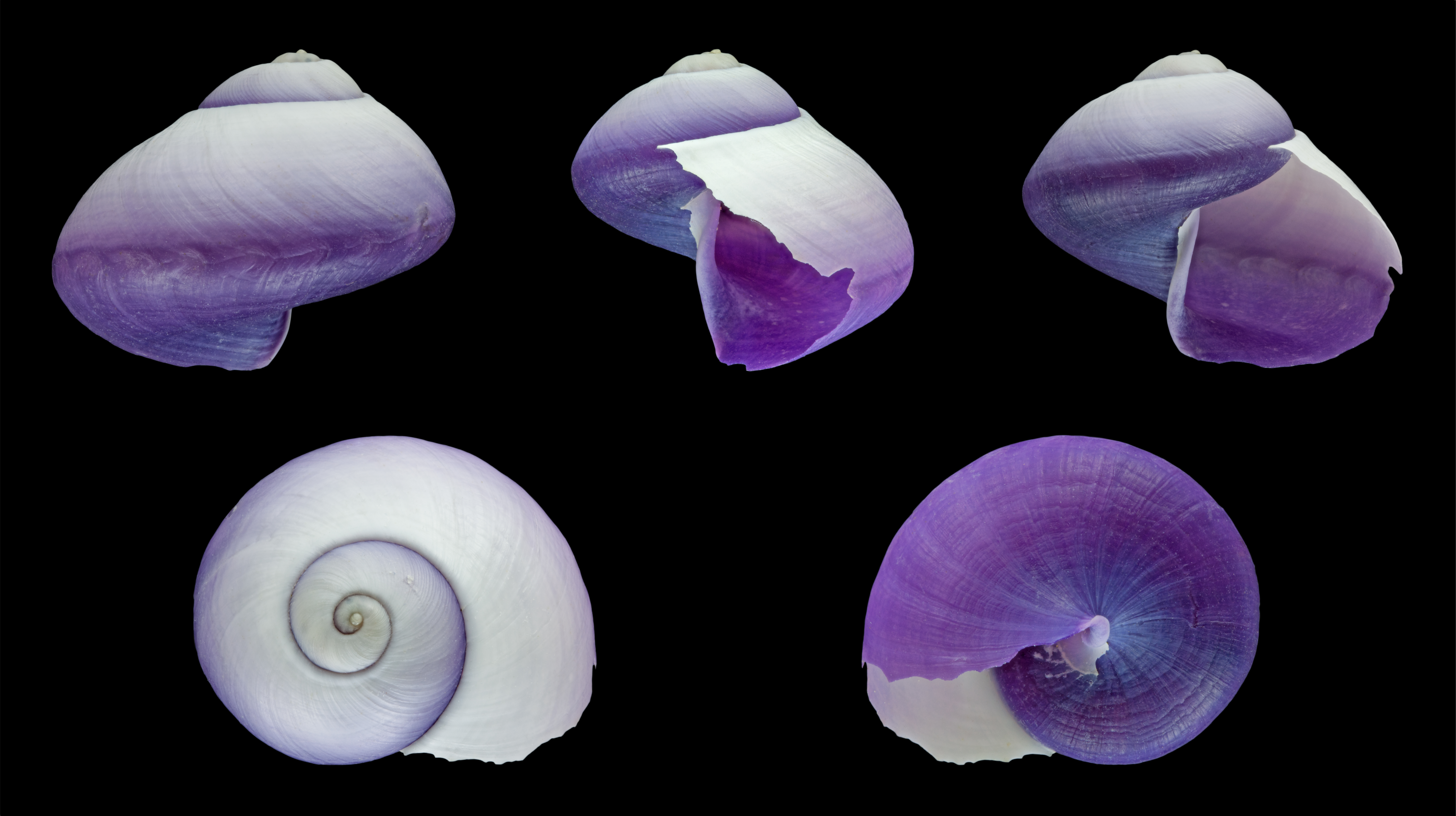
- Janthina janthina

Scientific classification
- Kingdom: Animalia
- Phylum: Mollusca
- Class: Gastropoda
- Subclass: Caenogastropoda
- Order: incertae sedis
- Superfamily: Epitonioidea
- Family: Epitoniidae; Berry, 1910 (1812)

Genera
- See text

Synonyms
- Acirsinae Cossmann, 1912; Acrillinae Jousseaume, 1912; Cirsotrematinae Jousseaume, 1912; Clathroscalinae Cossmann, 1912; Epitoniinae Berry, 1910 (1812); Gyroscalinae Jousseaume, 1912; Ianthinidae ( 19th century authors used indifferently the spellings Janthina / Ianthina and Janthinidae / Ianthinidae. The nomenclaturally valid name is Janthinidae, but the spelling Ianthinidae has remained sporadically in use throughout the 20th century.); Iodeidae Leach, 1847 (unavailable name); Janthinidae Lamarck, 1822; Lioatlantinae B. Dybowski & Grochmalicki, 1920; Nystiellidae Clench & R. D. Turner, 1952; Opaliinae Cossmann, 1912; Papyriscalinae Jousseaume, 1912; Recluziidae Iredale & McMichael, 1962 (nomen nudum); Scalariidae Lamarck, 1812; Scalidae H. Adams & A. Adams, 1853 (synonym); Stenacmidae Pilsbry, 1945

= Wentletrap =

Family of gastropods

Wentletraps are small, often white, very high-spired, predatory or ectoparasitic sea snails, marine gastropod mollusks in the family Epitoniidae. The family Epitoniidae belongs to the superfamily Epitonioidea. Since 2017 this family also includes the former families Janthinidae (the pelagic purple snails) and Nystiellidae, all part of the informal group Ptenoglossa. Epitoniidae is a rather large family, with an estimated number of species about 630.

The word wentletrap originated in Dutch (wenteltrap), and it means spiral staircase. These snails are sometimes also called "staircase shells", and "ladder shells".

== Distribution ==
Wentletraps inhabit all seas and oceans worldwide, from the tropical zones to the Arctic and Antarctic zones.

== Shell description ==
Most species of wentletrap are white, and have a porcelain-like appearance. They are notable for their intricately geometric shell architecture, and the shells of the larger species are prized by collectors.

The more or less turret-shaped shell consists of tightly-wound (sometimes loosely coiled), convex whorls, which create a high, conical spiral. Fine or microscopic spiral sculpture (also called "striae") is present in many species. The shells sometimes feature an umbilicus. Wentletrap shells have a roundish or oval aperture, but its inner lip is often reduced to strip of callus. The round and horny operculum is paucispiral and fits the aperture tightly. Most of the species in the family are small to minute, although some are larger, and overall the adult shell length in the family varies between 0.6 and 11.7 cm.

Within the genus Epitonium, the type genus of the family, the shell has predominantly axial sculpture of high, sharply ribbed "costae". These costae may offer some protection against other predatory snails, which would find it difficult or impossible to bore a hole in a shell with such obstructions.

== Ecology ==
Wentletraps are usually found on sandy bottoms near sea anemones or corals, which serve as a food source for them. Some species are foragers and search for anemones.

Little is known about the biology of most wentletraps. Keen (1958) is most often cited. He observed that many wentletraps reveal a hint of purple body color, suggestive of carnivorous feeding. The animal can exude through its salivary gland a pink or purplish dye that may have an anaesthetic effect on its prey.

Keen also cited direct observation of a wentletrap feeding by insertion of its proboscis into a sea anemone.

A sequence of a wentletrap feeding on an anemone has been published. These snails also prey on corals and other coelenterates.

Female wentletraps lay egg capsules that are bound together with a supple string. The young emerge from these capsules as free-swimming larvae.

== Genera ==
Genera within the family Epitoniidae include:

- Acirsa Mörch, 1857
- Acrilla H. Adams, 1860
- Acrilloscala Sacco 1891
- Alexania Strand, 1928
- Alora (H. Adams, 1861)
- Amaea H. & A. Adams, 1853
- Boreoscala Kobelt, 1902 (possibly a synonym of Cirsotrema)
- † Cavoscala Whitfield, 1892
- † Cerithiscala de Boury, 1887
- Chuniscala Thiele, 1928
- Cingulacirsa Higo & Goto, 1993 (unaccepted > nomen nudum)
- † Circuloscala de Boury, 1886
- Cirsotrema Mörch, 1852
- Clathroscala de Boury, 1890
- † Clathrus Agassiz, 1837
- Claviscala de Boury, 1909
- † Confusiscala de Boury, 1909
- Couthouyella Bartsch 1909
- Crebriscala de Boury, 1909
- Cycloscala Dall, 1889
- Cylindriscala de Boury, 1909
- Ecclesiogyra Dall, 1892
- Eglisia Gray, 1842
- Epidendrium A. Gittenberger & E. Gittenberger, 2005
- Epifungium A. Gittenberger & E. Gittenberger, 2005
- Epitonium Röding, 1798
- Eulima Risso, 1826
- Filiscala de Boury, 1911
- † Foratiscala de Boury, 1887
- Fragilopalia Azuma, 1972
- Funiscala de Boury, 1890
- † Gibboscala Kollmann, 2005
- Globiscala de Boury, 1909
- † Goniscala Marwick, 1943
- Gregorioiscala Cossman, 1912
- Gyroscala de Boury, 1887
- Iphitus Jeffreys, 1883
- Janthina Röding, 1798
- Kurodacirsa Masahito & Habe, 1975
- † Liapinella Guzhov, 2006
- Mammiscala de Boury, 1909
- Minabescala Nakayama, 1994
- Murdochella H. J. Finlay, 1926
- Narrimania Taviani, 1984
- Narvaliscala Iredale, 1936
- Opalia H. & A. Adams, 1853
- Opaliopsis Thiele, 1928
- Periapta Bouchet & Waren, 1986
- † Plicacerithium Gerasimov, 1992
- Propescala Cotton & Godfrey, 1931
- † Proscala Cossmann, 1912
- Punctiscala Philippi, 1844
- Recluzia Petit de la Saussaye, 1853
- Rectacirsa Iredale, 1936
- Rutelliscala Kilburn, 1985
- Sthenorhytis Conrad 1862
- Striatiscala de Boury, 1909
- Surrepifungium A. Gittenberger & E. Gittenberger, 2005
- Tenuiscala de Boury, 1887
- Tumidiacirsa de Boury, 1911
- † Turriscala de Boury, 1890 †
- Variciscala de Boury, 1909
- Varicopalia Kuroda MS, 1960 (nomen nudum)

== Synonyms ==
- Acrilla H. Adams, 1860: synonym of Amaea H. Adams & A. Adams, 1853
- Acutiscala de Boury, 1909 : synonym of Epitonium Röding, 1798
- Amiciscala Jousseaume 1912 : synonym of Epitonium Röding, 1798
- Asperiscala de Boury, 1909: synonym of Epitonium Röding, 1798
- Cinctiscala de Boury 1909 : synonym of Asperiscala de Boury, 1909
- Cirratiscala de Boury, 1909 : synonym of Epitonium Röding, 1798
- Clathroscala de Boury 1889 : synonym of Amaea H. Adams & A. Adams, 1853
- Clathrus Oken 1815 : synonym of Epitonium Röding, 1798
- Compressiscala Masahito (Prince) & Habe 1976 : synonym of Gregorioiscala Cossmann, 1912
- Dannevigena Iredale 1936 : synonym of Cirsotrema Mörch, 1852
- Depressiscala de Boury 1909 : synonym of Epitonium Röding, 1798
- Foliaceiscala de Boury 1912 : synonym of Epitonium Röding, 1798
- Fragiliscala Azuma 1962 : synonym of Amaea H. Adams & A. Adams, 1853
- FragilopaliaAzuma 1972 : synonym of Amaea H. Adams & A. Adams, 1853
- Glabriscala de Boury 1909 : synonym of Epitonium Röding, 1798
- Lampropalia Kuroda & Ito, 1961 : synonym of Cylindriscala de Boury, 1909
- Mazescala Iredale 1936 : synonym of Epitonium Röding, 1798
- Nipponoscala Masahito (Prince) & Habe 1973 : synonym of Epitonium Röding, 1798
- Nodiscala de Boury 1889 : synonym of Opalia H. Adams & A. Adams, 1853
- Nystiella Clench & Turner, 1952 : synonym of Opaliopsis Thiele, 1928
- Plastiscala Iredale, 1936 : synonym of Acirsa Mörch, 1857 (junior subjective synonym)
- Problitora Iredale, 1931 : synonym of Alexania Strand, 1928 (uncertain synonym)
- Sagamiscala Masahito, Kuroda & Habe, 1971 : synonym of Globiscala de Boury, 1909
- Scala Mörch, 1852 : synonym of Epitonium Röding, 1798
- Scalina Conrad, 1865 : synonym of Amaea H. Adams & A. Adams, 1853
- Spiniscala de Boury, 1909 : synonym of Epitonium Röding, 1798
- Turbiniscala de Boury 1909 : synonym of Epitonium Röding, 1798
- Viciniscala de Boury 1909 : synonym of Epitonium Röding, 1798
