= Gallica (disambiguation) =

Gallica is the Latin term to refer to someone or something from Gaul or France.

Gallica, the digital library of the Bibliothèque nationale de France.

Gallica may also refer to:

== Military history ==
- Battle of Sena Gallica (82 BC), part of the first Roman Civil War where Sulla's forces under Gnaeus Pompeius Magnus defeated their Populares rivals under Gaius Marcius Censorinus
- Battle of Sena Gallica (551), naval battle fought between the Byzantine Empire and the Ostrogothic Kingdom resulting in a Byzantine victory
- Legio II Gallica, a Roman legion
- Legio III Gallica, a Roman legion
- Legio V Alaudae, sometimes referred to as Legio V Gallica, a Roman legion
- Legio XVI Gallica, a Roman legion

== Taxonomic names of species ==
- Aclis gallica, an extinct species of sea snail of the family Eulimidae
- Acrilla gallica, an extinct species of sea snail of the family Epitoniidae
- Armillaria gallica, a species of honey mushroom
- Astata gallica, a species of wasp in the family Astatidae
- Cardiocondyla elegans, sometimes referred to as Xenometra gallica, an ant species in the genus Cardiocondyla
- Cholovocera gallica, a species of beetle of the family Endomychidae
- Clonopsis gallica, a stick insect species of the genus Clonopsis
- Coriolopsis gallica, a.k.a. brownflesh bracket, a fungus of the genus Coriolopsis
- Ephysteris insulella, sometimes referred to as Opacopsis gallica, a moth in the family Gelechiidae
- Geodia gallica, a species of sponge in the family Geodiidae
- Logfia gallica, a.k.a. Filago gallica, narrowleaf cottonrose, or daggerleaf cottonrose, a species of herbaceous plant
- Malva subovata, a.k.a. tree mallow, sometimes referred to as Teleiodes gallica, a species of flowering plant in the family Malvaceae
- Mentha arvensis, a.k.a. corn mint, field mint, or wild mint, sometimes referred to as Mentha gallica, species of flowering plant in the mint family Lamiaceae
- Mordellistena gallica, a beetle in the genus Mordellistena
- Nigella gallica, a species of flowering plant in the family Ranunculaceae
- Phytophthora gallica, an oomycete of the genus Phytophthora
- Rosa gallica, a.k.a. the Gallic rose, French rose, or rose of Provins, a species of rose
- Scoparia gallica, a species of moth in the family Crambidae
- Silene gallica, a.k.a. common catchfly, small-flowered catchfly, or windmill pink, a species of flowering plant in the family Caryophyllaceae
- Spallanzania hebes, sometimes referred to as Spallanzania gallica, a genus of flies in the gamily Tachinidae
- Tamarix gallica, a.k.a. French tamarisk, a deciduous shrub
- Teleiodes italica, sometimes referred to as Teleiodes gallica, a moth of the family Gelechiidae
- Tulipa sylvestris, a.k.a. wild tulip or woodland tulip, sometimes referred to as Tulipa gallica, a Eurasian and North African species of wild tulip
- Ulmus 'Gallica', a cultivar of suckering elm

== Other ==
- Via Gallica, an ancient road of northern Italy
- British NVC community OV2 the Briza minior - Silene gallica community in the open habitat communities in the British National Vegetation Classification system
- Chronica Gallica of 452, a chronicle of late antiquity covering the period 379-452
- Chronica Gallica of 511, a chronicle of late antiquity covering the period 379–509/511
- Gallica, a kingdom in John Flanagan's book series, The Ranger's Apprentice

== See also ==
- Gallic (disambiguation)
- Gallia (disambiguation)
- Gallico
- Galica
- Galicia
