= Acrilla leptalea =

Scientific classification
- Kingdom: Animalia
- Phylum: Mollusca
- Class: Gastropoda
- Subclass: Caenogastropoda
- Order: incertae sedis
- Superfamily: Epitonioidea
- Family: Epitoniidae
- Genus: Acrilla
- Species: †A. leptalea

Binomial name
- †Acrilla leptalea (Tate, 1893)

Synonyms
- † Scalaria (Acrilla) leptalea Tate, 1893 (homonym: superseded combination. Not K. Bush, 1885)

Species of gastropod

Acrilla leptalea is an extinct species of sea snail, a marine gastropod mollusk in the family Epitoniidae, the wentletraps.

== Distribution ==
Fossils of this marine species were found in older Tertiary strata in Victoria, Australia.
