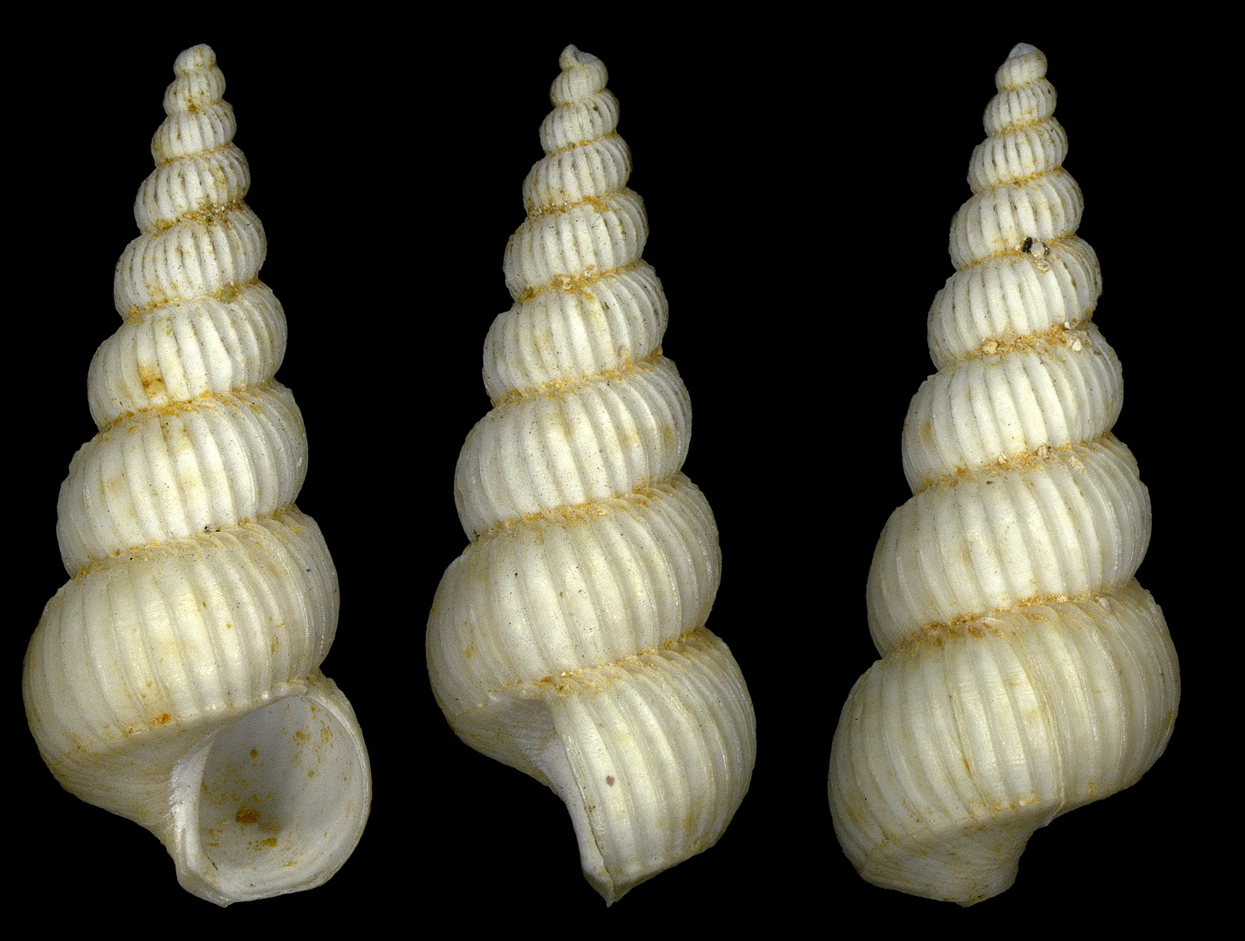
- Shell of † Acrilla grignonensis (syntype at MNHN, Paris)

Scientific classification
- Kingdom: Animalia
- Phylum: Mollusca
- Class: Gastropoda
- Subclass: Caenogastropoda
- Order: incertae sedis
- Superfamily: Epitonioidea
- Family: Epitoniidae
- Genus: Acrilla
- Species: †A. grignonensis

Binomial name
- †Acrilla grignonensis (Cossmann, 1888)

Synonyms
- † Scala (Acrilla) grignonensis (Cossmann, 1888); † Amaea (Acrilla) reticulata grignonensis (Cossmann, 1888)

= Acrilla grignonensis =

Species of gastropod

Acrilla grignonensis is an extinct species of sea snail, a marine gastropod mollusk in the family Epitoniidae, the wentletraps.

== Distribution ==
Fossils of this marine species have been found in Eocene strata in Yvelines, France.
