= Acrilla cuisensis =

Scientific classification
- Kingdom: Animalia
- Phylum: Mollusca
- Class: Gastropoda
- Subclass: Caenogastropoda
- Order: incertae sedis
- Superfamily: Epitonioidea
- Family: Epitoniidae
- Genus: Acrilla
- Species: †A. cuisensis

Binomial name
- †Acrilla cuisensis de Boury, 1887

Synonyms
- † Amaea (Acrilla) cuisensis (de Boury, 1887) superseded combination

Species of gastropod

Acrilla cuisensis is an extinct species of sea snail, a marine gastropod mollusk in the family Epitoniidae, the wentletraps.

== Distribution ==
Fossils of this marine species have been found in Eocene strata in Picardy, France.
