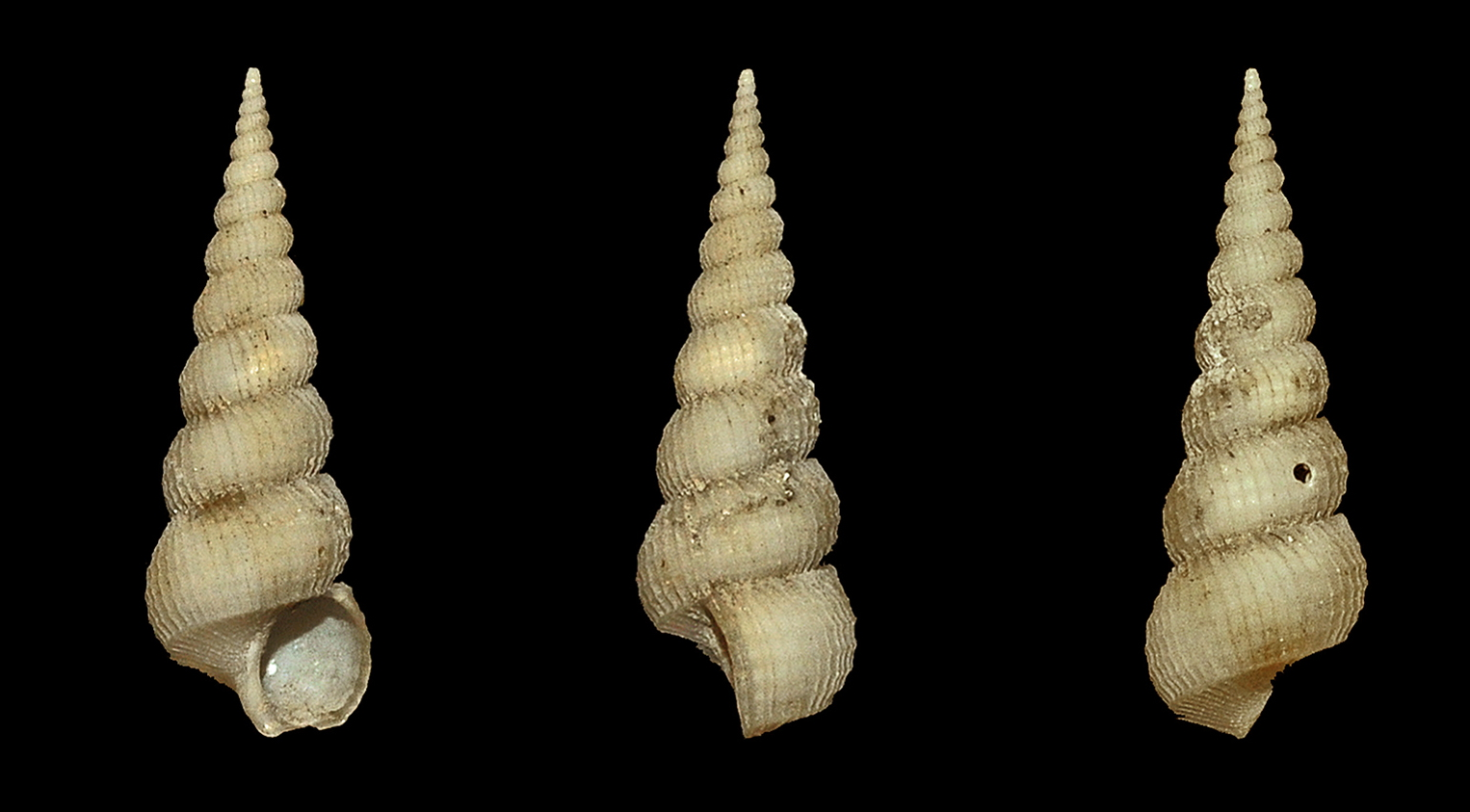
- Shell of Acrilla miobronni (specimen at MNHN, Paris)

Scientific classification
- Kingdom: Animalia
- Phylum: Mollusca
- Class: Gastropoda
- Subclass: Caenogastropoda
- Order: incertae sedis
- Superfamily: Epitonioidea
- Family: Epitoniidae
- Genus: Acrilla
- Species: †A. miobronni

Binomial name
- †Acrilla miobronni (Sacco, 1891)

= Acrilla miobronni =

Species of gastropod

Acrilla miobronni is an extinct species of sea snail, a marine gastropod mollusk in the family Epitoniidae, the wentletraps.

== Distribution ==
Fossils of this marine species have been found in Miocene strata in the Landes, France
