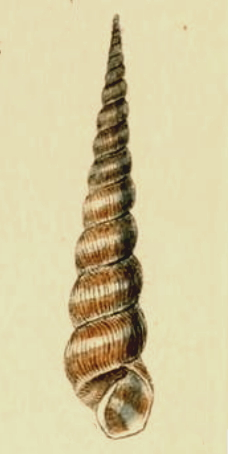
- Shell of Acrilla acuminata (holotype)

Scientific classification
- Kingdom: Animalia
- Phylum: Mollusca
- Class: Gastropoda
- Subclass: Caenogastropoda
- Order: incertae sedis
- Superfamily: Epitonioidea
- Family: Epitoniidae
- Genus: Acrilla
- Species: A. acuminata

Binomial name
- Acrilla acuminata (G. B. Sowerby II, 1844)

Synonyms
- Aclis acuminata (G. B. Sowerby II, 1844); Amaea acuminata (G. B. Sowerby II, 1844); Epitonium acuminatum (G. B. Sowerby II, 1844); Scalaria acuminata G. B. Sowerby II, 1844 (original combination); Scalaria subtilis var. laevis Grabau & S. G. King, 1928

= Acrilla acuminata =

Species of gastropod

Acrilla acuminata is a species of sea snail, a marine gastropod mollusk in the family Epitoniidae, the wentletraps.

== Description ==
The elongated, acuminate shell is imperforate. The shell contains 15 whorls. These are barely protruding, and are surrounded in front by a thin keel. The sculpture shows very numerous, thin and curvilinear varicose threads. The oval aperture has a thin margin. The pale yellow shell shows on each whorl two bands, one pale near the suture, one broad, distinct in the middle of the whorls.

== Distribution ==
This marine species was found originally off Malacca, Malaysia. It also occurs off Taiwan, Korea, Japan and Australia.
