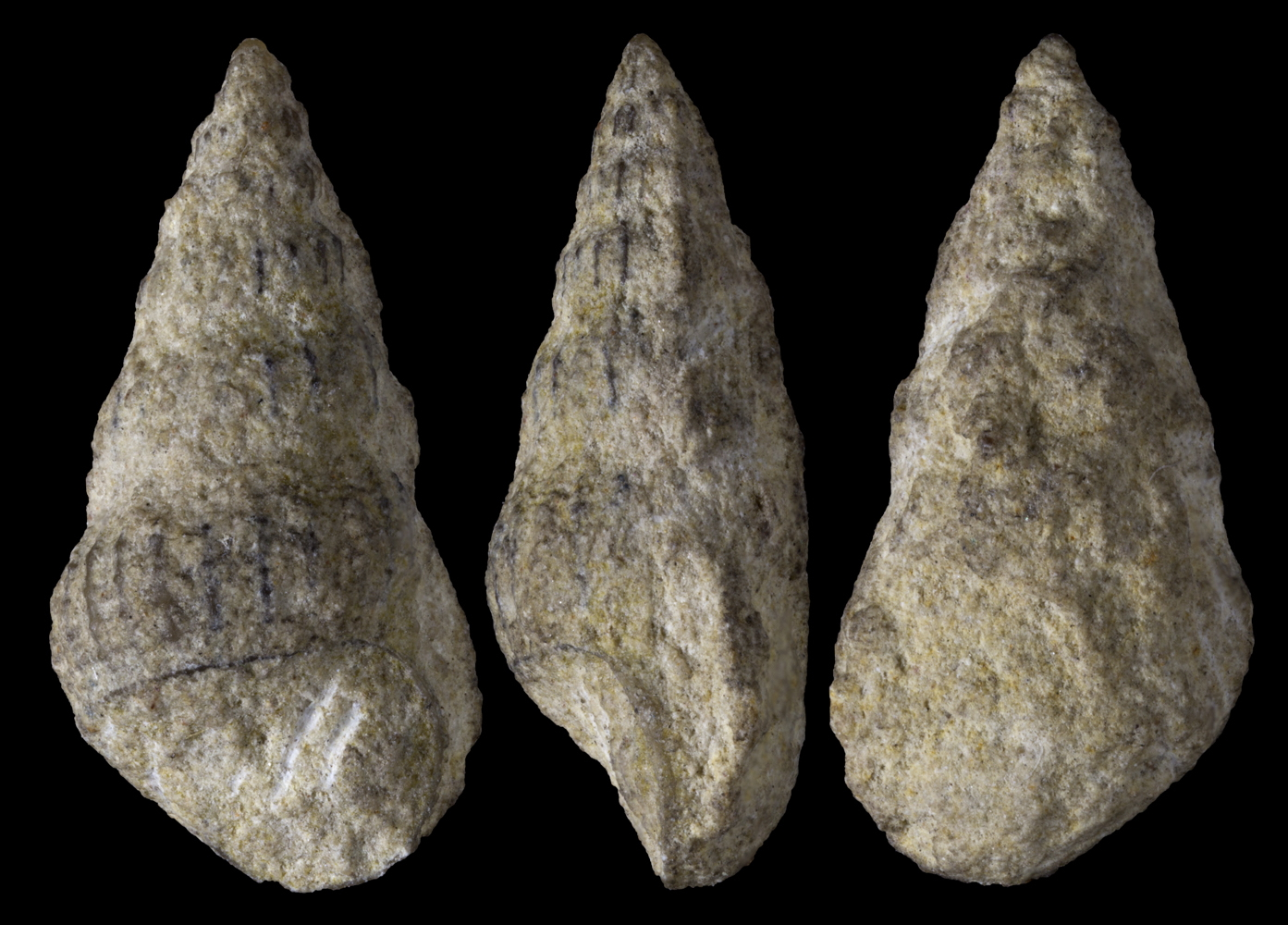
- Shell of Acrilla desertorum (specimen at MNHN, Paris)

Scientific classification
- Kingdom: Animalia
- Phylum: Mollusca
- Class: Gastropoda
- Subclass: Caenogastropoda
- Order: incertae sedis
- Superfamily: Epitonioidea
- Family: Epitoniidae
- Genus: Acrilla
- Species: †A. desertorum

Binomial name
- †Acrilla desertorum (Wanner, 1902)

= Acrilla desertorum =

Species of gastropod

Acrilla desertorum is an extinct species of sea snail, a marine gastropod mollusk in the family Epitoniidae, the wentletraps.

== Distribution ==
Fossils of this marine species have been found in Paleocene strata in West Senegal.
