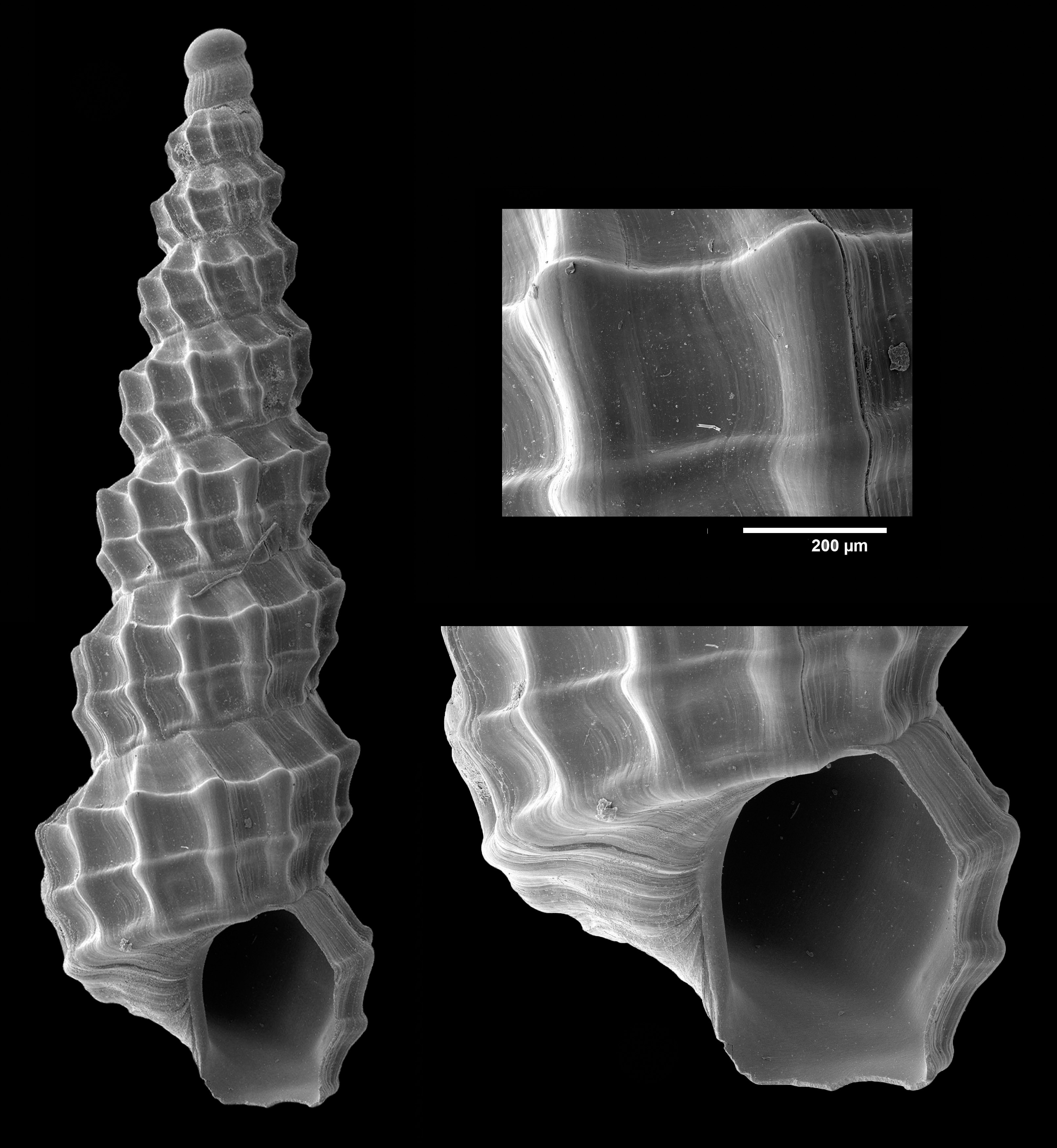
- Shell of Papuliscala dictyophora (holotype at MNHN, Paris)

Scientific classification
- Kingdom: Animalia
- Phylum: Mollusca
- Class: Gastropoda
- Subclass: Caenogastropoda
- Order: incertae sedis
- Superfamily: Epitonioidea
- Family: Epitoniidae
- Genus: Papuliscala de Boury, 1911

Type species
- Acirsa praelonga Jeffreys, 1877

Synonyms
- Pustuliscala de Boury, 1921 (An incorrect subsequent spelling and/or a junior objective synonym of Papuliscala); Scala (Papuliscala) de Boury, 1911 (original rank)

= Papuliscala =

Genus of gastropods

Papuliscala is a genus of small sea snails, marine gastropods in the family Epitoniidae of the superfamily Epitonioidea, the wentletraps, the purple snails, and their allies.

== Species ==
Species within the genus Papuliscala include:

- † Papuliscala ambulator Lozouet, 1999
- Papuliscala atlantisa Hoffman, Gofas & Freiwald, 2020
- Papuliscala carolienae Hoffman, Gofas & Freiwald, 2020
- Papuliscala cerithielloides Bouchet & Warén, 1986
- Papuliscala daani Hoffman, Gofas & Freiwald, 2020
- Papuliscala dictyophora Hoffman, Gofas & Freiwald, 2020
- Papuliscala diminuta Castellanos, Rolán & Bartolotta, 1987
- Papuliscala elongata (Watson, 1881)
- Papuliscala japonica (Okutani, 1964)
- Papuliscala luuki Hoffman, Gofas & Freiwald, 2020
- Papuliscala lydiae Hoffman & Freiwald, 2017
- Papuliscala meteorica Hoffman, Gofas & Freiwald, 2020
- Papuliscala mikra Hoffman, Gofas & Freiwald, 2020
- Papuliscala platoensis Hoffman, Gofas & Freiwald, 2020
- Papuliscala praelonga (Jeffreys, 1877)
- Papuliscala seamountae Hoffman, Gofas & Freiwald, 2020
- Papuliscala superlata (Finlay, 1930)
- Papuliscala tavianii Bouchet & Warén, 1986
- Papuliscala vixcostata Hoffman, Gofas & Freiwald, 2020

Synonymized species

- Papuliscala annectens (A. W. B. Powell, 1951): synonym of Gregorioiscala annectens (A. W. B. Powell, 1951)
- Papuliscala nordestina S. Lima & Christoffersen, 2013: synonym of Papuliscala elongata (R. B. Watson, 1881)
- Papuliscala scalariformis (de Folin, 1877): synonym of Papuliscala praelonga (Jeffreys, 1877)
