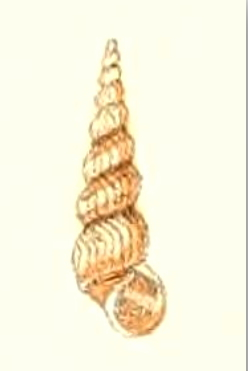
- Shell of Acrilla minor (holotype)

Scientific classification
- Kingdom: Animalia
- Phylum: Mollusca
- Class: Gastropoda
- Subclass: Caenogastropoda
- Order: incertae sedis
- Superfamily: Epitonioidea
- Family: Epitoniidae
- Genus: Acrilla
- Species: A. minor

Binomial name
- Acrilla minor (G. B. Sowerby II, 1873)

Synonyms
- Acrilla adenensis Jousseaume, 1912 junior subjective synonym; Acrilla gracilis H. Adams, 1860 (invalid: junior secondary homonym...); Acrilla thalia Bartsch, 1915 (junior synonym); Amaea (Acrilla) minor (G. B. Sowerby II, 1873) superseded combination; Amaea adenensis (Jousseaume, 1912) junior subjective synonym; Amaea gracilis (H. Adams, 1873); Amaea minor (G. B. Sowerby II, 1873) superseded combination; Scalaria minor G. B. Sowerby II, 1873 · unaccepted (original combination)

= Acrilla minor =

Species of gastropod

Acrilla minor is a species of sea snail, a marine gastropod mollusk in the family Epitoniidae, the wentletraps.

== Description ==
The length of the shell is up to 18.2 mm (0.72 in).

(Described as Acrilla thalia) The elongate-conic shell is light brown, with a narrow white band on the middle of each whorl. The whorls of the protoconch are decollated. The remaining whorls are decidedly rounded, separated by a strongly constricted suture. They are marked by well developed, very regular, almost vertical axial ribs, of which 18 occur upon the first of the remaining whorls; 20 upon the second; 22 upon the third and fourth; 26 upon the fifth; 28 upon the sixth, and 34 upon the seventh and the penultimate whorl. These ribs are about one third as wide as the spaces that separate them. The intercostal spaces are marked by irregularly distributed, feebly incised, spiral striations. The periphery of the body whorl is well rounded. It is marked by a poorly developed spiral cord. The base of the shell is moderately rounded, marked by the continuations of the axial ribs, and feebly incised, spiral striations. The aperture is oval. The outer lip is thin, showing the external markings within. The inner lip is decidedly curved and reflected. The parietal wall is glazed with a thin callus.

== Distribution ==
This marine species has a wide distribution and occurs off South Africa, Aden Yemen, India, Vietnam, Taiwan, New Zealand and Australia.
