= Acrilla crebrilamellata =

Scientific classification
- Kingdom: Animalia
- Phylum: Mollusca
- Class: Gastropoda
- Subclass: Caenogastropoda
- Order: incertae sedis
- Superfamily: Epitonioidea
- Family: Epitoniidae
- Genus: Acrilla
- Species: †A. crebrilamellata

Binomial name
- †Acrilla crebrilamellata (Tate, 1890)

Synonyms
- † Scalaria (Acrilla) crebrilamellata (Tate, 1890) superseded combination

Species of gastropod

Acrilla crebrilamellata is an extinct species of sea snail, a marine gastropod mollusk in the family Epitoniidae, the wentletraps.

== Description ==
The length of the shell is up to 9 mm, its diameter 2 mm.

(Original description) The rather thi shell is very slender and is imperforate. It contains nine flat whorls with a slightly channelled suture. The protoconch contains 2 1/2 whorls, the anterior one much contracted and ornamented with crowded oblique threadlets, the next is inflated and smooth ending in a bulbiform tip.

The transverse sculpture consists of oblique, crowded, short, erect lamellae, which are usually so dense as to conceal the suture and the spiral sculpture. The latter consists of five, equidistant, equal, narrow, elevated, flat-edged lines. The body whorl shows six spiral lines, the anterior one interrupting the convexity of the base. The base shows a strong spiral thread and is radially striate.

== Distribution ==
Fossils of this marine species have been found in Eocene strata in Victoria, Australia.
