= C. gallica =

C. gallica may refer to:

- Clonopsis gallica a stick insect species found in France
- Coriolopsis gallica, a fungus species found growing on decaying wood

== See also ==
- Gallica (disambiguation)
