= Acrilla affinis =

Scientific classification
- Kingdom: Animalia
- Phylum: Mollusca
- Class: Gastropoda
- Subclass: Caenogastropoda
- Order: incertae sedis
- Superfamily: Epitonioidea
- Family: Epitoniidae
- Genus: Acrilla
- Species: †A. affinis

Binomial name
- †Acrilla affinis (Deshayes, 1861)

Synonyms
- † Amaea (Acrilla) affinis (Deshayes, 1861) superseded combination; † Scalaria affinis Deshayes, 1861 superseded combination

Species of gastropod

Acrilla affinis is an extinct species of sea snail, a marine gastropod mollusk in the family Epitoniidae, the wentletraps.

== Description ==
(Original description in French) This is an elongated, turriculated, narrow shell, with fifteen to sixteen convex whorls, joined by a fairly deep but not canaliculated suture. The surface is decorated with a large number of longitudinal, thin, equal and regular ribs. They are straight for the greater part of their length, but reaching the vicinity of the suture, their lower end bends sharply, forming a small auricle. At the opposite end, they stop abruptly at the suture. The rather narrow interstices of the ribs show under the magnifying glass very fine transverse striations, obsolete, but of admirable regularity. The body whorl is short and subglobose. It carries at the base a disc with an angular edge entirely hidden by the suture, while in the multilamella it overflows and produces a small bulge in the suture. On this disc, small radiating and curved ribs can be seen, between which very fine concentric streaks can be seen. A circular aperture with continuous edges ends the body whorl.

== Distribution ==
Fossils have been found in Eocene strata in Seine-et-Marne, France.
