= Acrilla lamberti =

Scientific classification
- Kingdom: Animalia
- Phylum: Mollusca
- Class: Gastropoda
- Subclass: Caenogastropoda
- Order: incertae sedis
- Superfamily: Epitonioidea
- Family: Epitoniidae
- Genus: Acrilla
- Species: †A. lamberti

Binomial name
- †Acrilla lamberti (Deshayes, 1861)

Synonyms
- † Amaea (Acrilla) lamberti (Deshayes, 1861) superseded combination; † Scalaria lamberti Deshayes, 1861 superseded combination

Species of gastropod

Acrilla lamberti is an extinct species of sea snail, a marine gastropod mollusk in the family Epitoniidae, the wentletraps.

== Description ==
The length of the is shell is up to 14 mm, its diameter 4 mm.

(Original description in French) The shell is turrilicate, narrow and very pointed at the top. Its very long spire is made up of thirteen convex whorls on which seventeen simple, straight, fairly narrow longitudinal ribs rise. These are convex and smooth, as is the rest of the shell. The body whorl is short, its base occupied by a large disc whose edge reaches the circumference. The surface of the disc is slightly concave. The oval aperture is small, with continuous edges, but having the anterior portion of the peristome in a straight line, ending in an angle obtuse at each end, a biangulate arrangement due to the shape of the disc.

== Distribution ==
Fossils have been found in Eocene strata in Seine-et-Marne, France.
