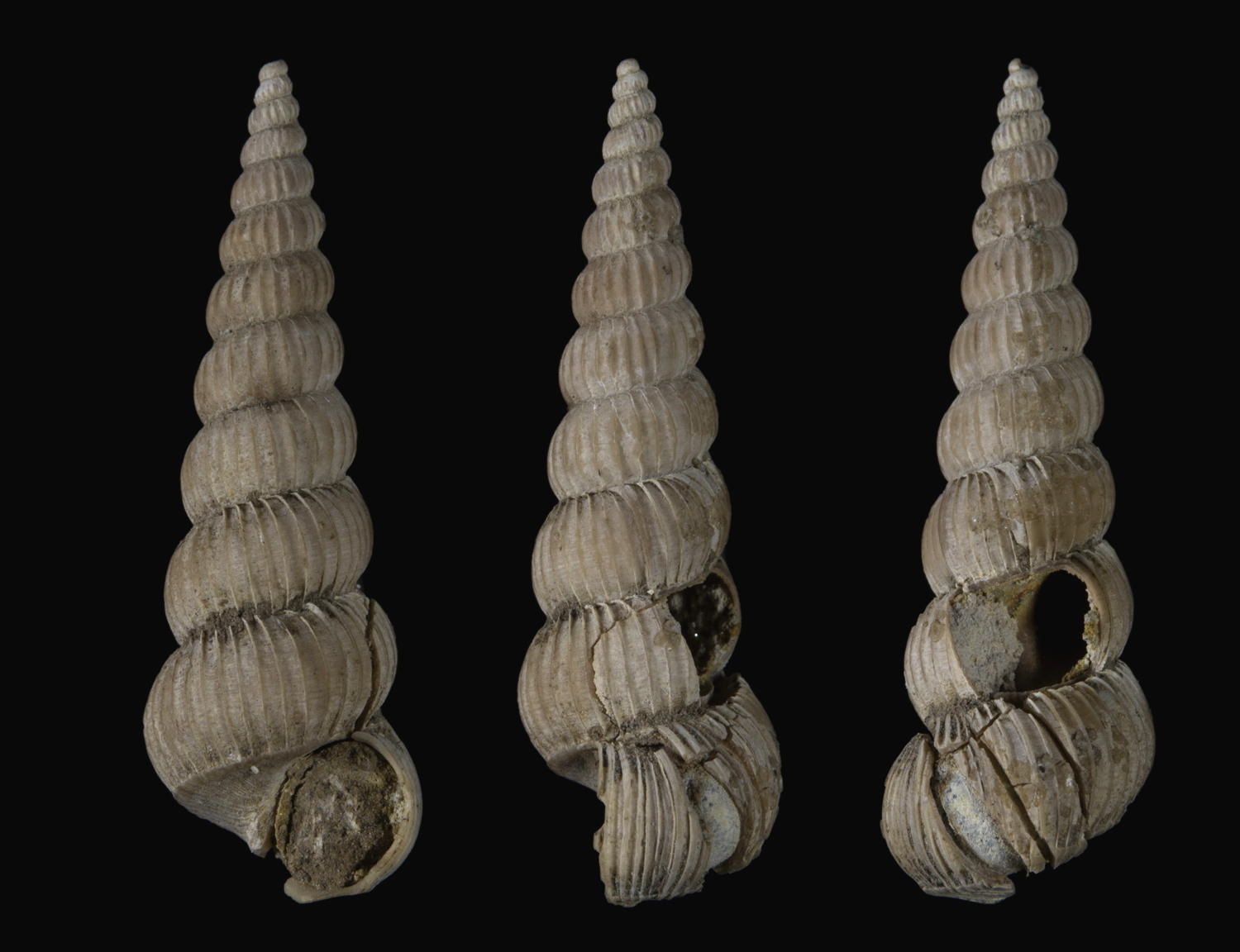
- Shell of † Acrilla reticulata (specimen at MNHN, Paris)

Scientific classification
- Kingdom: Animalia
- Phylum: Mollusca
- Class: Gastropoda
- Subclass: Caenogastropoda
- Order: incertae sedis
- Superfamily: Epitonioidea
- Family: Epitoniidae
- Genus: Acrilla
- Species: †A. reticulata

Binomial name
- †Acrilla reticulata (SOLANDER in BRANDER, 1766)

Synonyms
- † Amaea (Acrilla) reticulata (Solander in Brander, 1766)

= Acrilla reticulata =

Species of gastropod

Acrilla reticulata is an extinct species of sea snail, a marine gastropod mollusk in the family Epitoniidae, the wentletraps.

== Distribution ==
Fossils of this marine species have been found in Eocene strata in the Barton on Sea, Great Britain.
