= Giuseppe Cenni =

Italian World War II aviator (1915–1943)

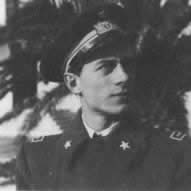
- Born: February 27, 1915; Casola Valsenio, Ravenna
- Died: September 4, 1943 (aged 28); Aspromonte, Reggio Calabria
- Burial place: Parma
- Military career
- Allegiance: Kingdom of Italy
- Branch: Regia Aeronautica
- Service years: 1935–1943
- Rank: Major (pilot)
- Units: 5º Stormo Tuffatori, 102º Gruppo, 239ª Squadriglia
- Commands: Stormo
- Conflicts: Spanish Civil War; Second World War
- Awards: 1 Gold Medal of Military Valor; 6 Silver Medals of Military Valor; 1 Iron Cross 2nd Class; 2 promotions by merit of war

Giuseppe Cenni (27 February 1915 – 4 September 1943) was an Italian officer and aviator. A Major in the Regia Aeronautica (Royal Air Force), he is a legend of the Italian Air Force: he was awarded the Gold Medal of Military Valor and six silver medals for military valor, 2nd class German Iron Cross, the transition to effective permanent service and two promotions for war merit, three Crosses to the merit of war; more than 200 war actions, 750 hours of war flight out of a total of 1,460; two wars fought as a protagonist, eight victories in Spain, where he is among the best hunting aces, facing even seven months of very harsh imprisonment, and in the Second World War he is the undisputed ace of dive bombing; he endured the combat loss, in the last war, of 19 pilots, 16 crew members and 13 specialists from her own department; at just 28 years old, he is the youngest Stormo commander of the Regia Aeronautica, Stormo who will be one of the few to be decorated with a gold medal; in seven years he passed from second lieutenant to major in effective permanent service, acting as lieutenant colonel; aerobatic instructor and champion in gliding, where he won national titles and was part of the Olympic group.

== Biography ==
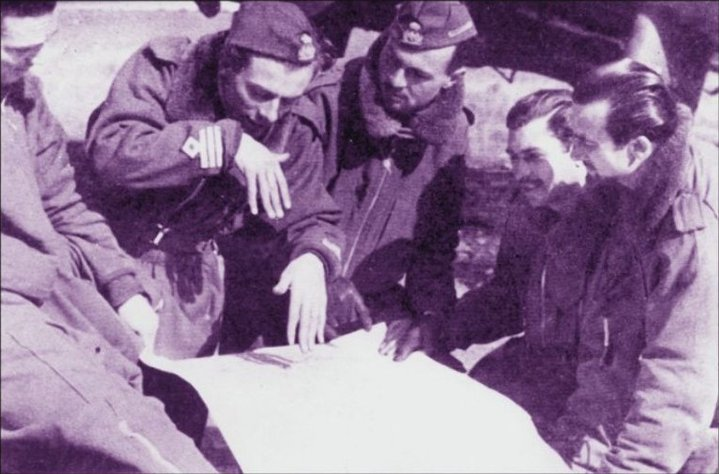
Giuseppe Cenni shows the sequence of the dives. All pilots of the 239th Squadron, and who are portrayed in the photo, will lose their lives in war action. [January 1941, Galatina (Lecce)]

Giuseppe Cenni developed a passion for aeronautics as a young man, building gliders while attending the Regio Istituto d'Arte (Royal Institute of Fine Arts) in Parma. On 19 June 1935 he enlisted in the Regia Aeronautica as an auxiliary officer cadet. He obtained his wings on 20 November, flying a Fiat CR.20. In 1936 he volunteered for the Spanish Civil War under the nom de guerre of "Vittorio Stella". He bailed out of his aircraft after a series of collisions in fog and was taken prisoner, but was released in an exchange of prisoners.

Returning to Italy from Spain, Cenni was decorated, returned to the Air Force as a regular officer, and was first assigned to the 6º Stormo, then to the 51º Stormo. At the same time, he qualified as an aerobatic instructor. At the outbreak of the Second World War, Cenni asked to be brought back from Romania, where he was taking courses for fighter pilots, and was sent to attend courses to qualify to fly the dive bombing plane Junkers Ju 87, or Stuka. Cenni was also promoted to captain and given command of the 239^{a} Squadriglia of autonomous dive-bombers on 24 November 1940. Based at Lecce Galatina Airport, he participated in dive bombing attacks in Greece and Yugoslavia. Cenni may have sunk the Greek transport SS Ioanna of 1,192 GRT on 21 April 1941 in Patras harbour.

In the months between May and October 1941 the Stukas, called "Picchiatelli" by the Italians, were redeployed to North Africa, where they continued missions against land and naval targets in the Mediterranean Sea. Cenni was once again confirmed to be a pilot with excellent flying skills, so much so that he developed a technique of dive bombing called "skip bombing", ending with a short dive in level flight. The bomb dropped and bounced on the water, hitting the side of the ship under attack and maximizing the damage. For his actions he was awarded two Silver Medals of Military Valor.

The growing technique disparity of Ju 87 aircraft against Allied fighters led Cenni to develop techniques for dive bombing at night. In the course of these actions, the Stuka operated by then-Captain Cenni inflicted much damage on British ships. Cenni was decorated with his sixth Silver Medal of Military Valor and promoted to major on the merits of war.

Shooting activities with the 5º Stormo at Crotone Airport replaced the Stuka with the Reggiane Re.2002. The squadron was made operational in July 1943 and Cenni was faced with the contemporary Allied invasion of Sicily. On 11, 12 and 13 July, dive bombing missions were made in the bay of Augusta, which led to the decimation of the crews. On 13 July, Allied bombers attacked Crotone Airport, destroying almost the entire Stormo and killing six other pilots. Cenni retreated with planes and crew survivors to the airport in Manduria in Apulia.

On 3 September, five days before the announcement of the armistice, which had already been signed in secret, Cenni was ordered to fight the Allied landing at Reggio Calabria. In the morning on 4 September 1943, 5º Stormo's CO Maggiore Cenni took off from Manduria at 11:25 leading twelve Reggiane Re.2002s of the 101º Gruppo and of the 102º Gruppo. The Reggiane were escorted by some Macchis of the 4º Stormo. The Reggianes were bound to bomb the area of Gallico, when they were intercepted by some Spitfire Mk.Vs and Mk.IXs of No. 111 Squadron RAF and No. 243 Squadron RAF. The Macchis started to dogfight with the Spitfire, while the Reggiane fighter-bombers were releasing thirty 100 kg bombs and spending 6100 .50 cal and 3600 .303 cal rounds. Four LCF were claimed sunk and many trucks and barracks destroyed. At this point, four Spitfires IX of 111 Squadron, flown by Flying Officer I. F. Kennedy, Sergeant R. Throwbridge, Sergeant R. Gray and Sergeant Eccleston, disengaged from the Macchis and dived on the last three Re.2002s, flown by Sergente Walter Banfi of the 208^{a} Squadriglia, Tenente Renato Moglia of the 209^{a} Squadriglia, and commander Cenni. Banfi was hit first, but he parachuted safely. Then the Spitfires chased Moglia and Cenni through the gorges of the Aspromonte but after a fierce chase Moglia was shot down and killed. Cenni, remained alone, and pursued by the Spitfires, tried to distance them flying at low altitude and engaging in a series of acrobatic maneuvers, but in the end his plane was hit and caught fire. Cenni fell on the Bonamico stream and was killed in the crash. He was posthumously awarded with the Medaglia d'oro al valor militare (Gold Medal of Military Valor).

== Personal life ==
Cenni was married and had a daughter.

== Honors ==
Military decorations
	Gold Medal of Military Valor
"Skilled pilot of fighters and dive bombers, cut short his brief youth for the greatness of the Country. Always and everywhere shone his illustrious spiritual and professional virtues; always the first into action and into danger he knew, in two wars he fought hard to earn six silver medals and two promotions by merit of war. In the memorable days of July 10 to 19, followed by the absolute dedication of the soldiers, the invaders countered with aggressive tireless persistence, overcoming human limitations and boldness in fierce combat with enemy fighters three times could disengage their followers attacked by overwhelming numbers of enemy fighters. During action of dive bombers into the hell of fire and sword of the landing area of the Strait of Messina he disappeared overwhelmed by the number. Imperishable example of elite military virtues, sublime patriotism, self-sacrifice and heroic devotion to duty."	Cielo del Mediterraneo, 10 July – 4 September 1943.
	Silver Medal of Military Valor
	Silver Medal of Military Valor
	Silver Medal of Military Valor
	Silver Medal of Military Valor
	Silver Medal of Military Valor
	Silver Medal of Military Valor
	Iron Cross 2nd Class

== Memorials ==
- The 5º Stormo of the Italian Air Force is dedicated to Major Giuseppe Cenni. The Stormo is stationed on the air base of Cervia-Pisignano (Ravenna).
- In the early sixties, Cenni's native municipality, Casola Valsenio (Ravenna), dedicated a street to him.
- The municipality of Parma, a city where Cenni moved as a child, has dedicated a street to him in the Citadel district.
- The municipality of Fiumicino has dedicated a street to Cenni near the Leonardo da Vinci Airport.
- The municipality of Varsi (Parma) has dedicated a street to Cenni.
- The town of Manduria (Taranto) has dedicated a street to Cenni.
- A monument in Reggio Calabria commemorates Cenni.
- The Piazzale within the military airport of Rimini is named for Cenni.

== Trivia ==
- At the beginning of his dive-bomber missions, Cenni began to use a radio signal to all pilots of the squadron to indicate the attack. The phrase was "valzer ragazzi!" ("Waltz guys!") Over the years, the phrase became famous and characteristic of the squadron. Since 1993, the phrase has been written on the empennage of the aircraft of the 102º Gruppo.

== Bibliography ==
- Smith, Peter C (2011). The Junkers Ju 87 Stuka: A Complete History. London: Crecy Publishing Limited. ISBN 978-0-85979-156-4
- Gen. Giuseppe Pesce (2002). Giuseppe Cenni, pilota in guerra. Roma – via Ufficio Storico Aeronautica militare. (PDF)
- Franco Pagliano (1964). Aviatori italiani (cap. Valzer mortale). Roma – via Longanesi & C.
- Antonio D'Agostino (1996). Reggio Calabria 3 - 4 settembre 1943. Reggio Calabria – via Jason.
- Gen. Giuseppe Pesce (1976). Il walzer del 102º Gruppo. Modena – via STEM Mucchi.
- Rocca, Gianni (1993). I disperati - La tragedia dell'aeronautica italiana nella seconda guerra mondiale. Milano. ISBN 88-04-44940-3.

=== Periodicals ===
- Emiliani, Angelo (April 1995). "Il "Tuffatore" della Regia Aeronautica (Giuseppe Cenni, pilota di Stuka venuto dalla caccia)". Storia Militare. 19. Parma.
- Migliavacca (AAA di Parma), Carlo (3 September 2012). "Giuseppe Cenni una leggenda dell'Aeronautica". Gazzetta di Parma. Parma.
- Migliavacca, Carlo (2013). Associazione Arma Aeronautica (ed.). "Ricordo di un eroe: il magg. pil. Giuseppe Cenni" (PDF). Aeronautica. 8–9. Roma.
