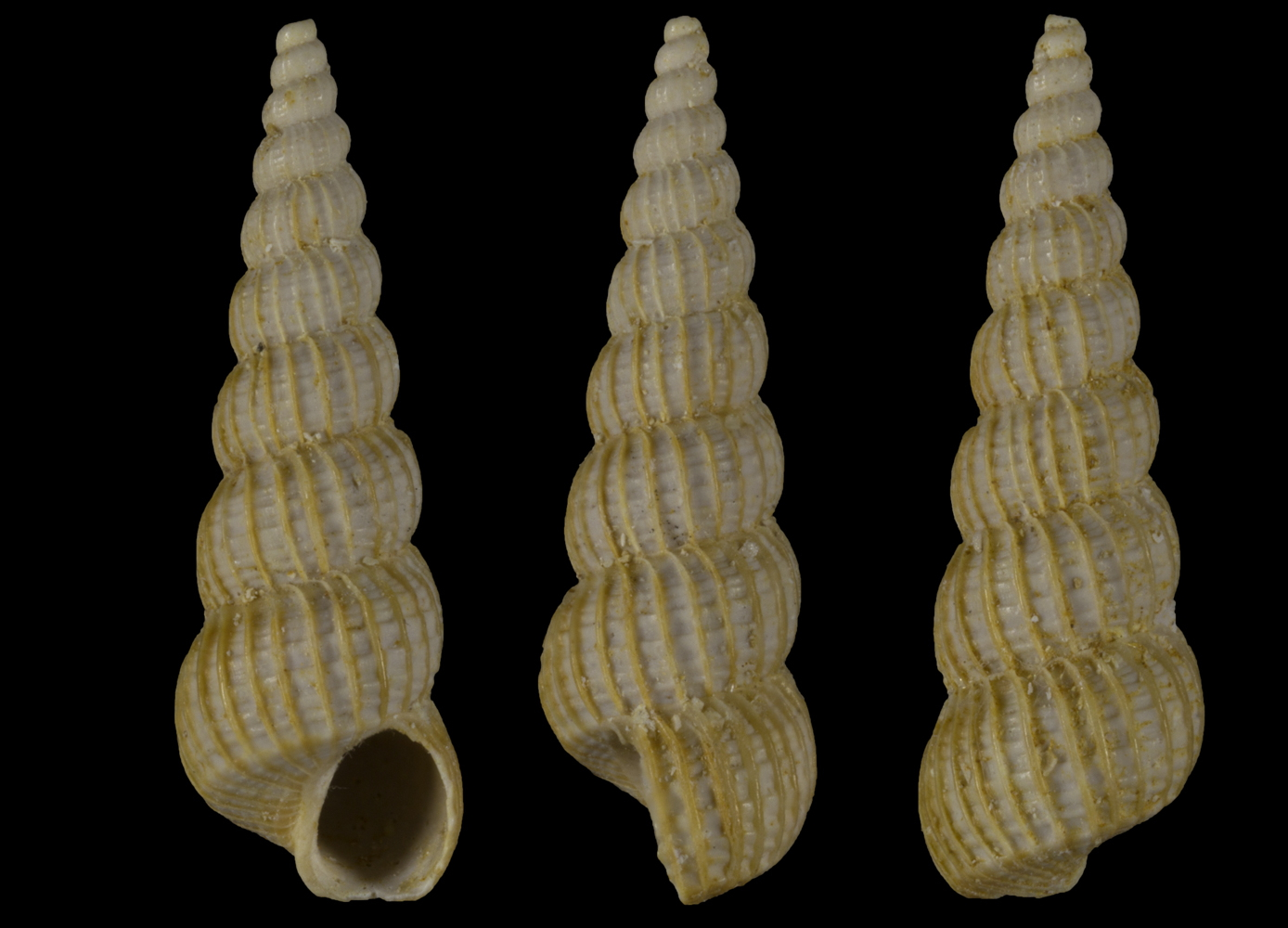
- Shell of Acrilla constantinensis (syntype at MNHN, Paris)

Scientific classification
- Kingdom: Animalia
- Phylum: Mollusca
- Class: Gastropoda
- Subclass: Caenogastropoda
- Order: incertae sedis
- Superfamily: Epitonioidea
- Family: Epitoniidae
- Genus: Acrilla
- Species: †A. constantinensis

Binomial name
- †Acrilla constantinensis Cossmann & Pissarro, 1902

= Acrilla constantinensis =

Species of gastropod

Acrilla constantinensis is an extinct species of sea snail, a marine gastropod mollusk in the family Epitoniidae, the wentletraps.

== Distribution ==
Fossils have been found in Eocene strata in Lower Normandy, France.
