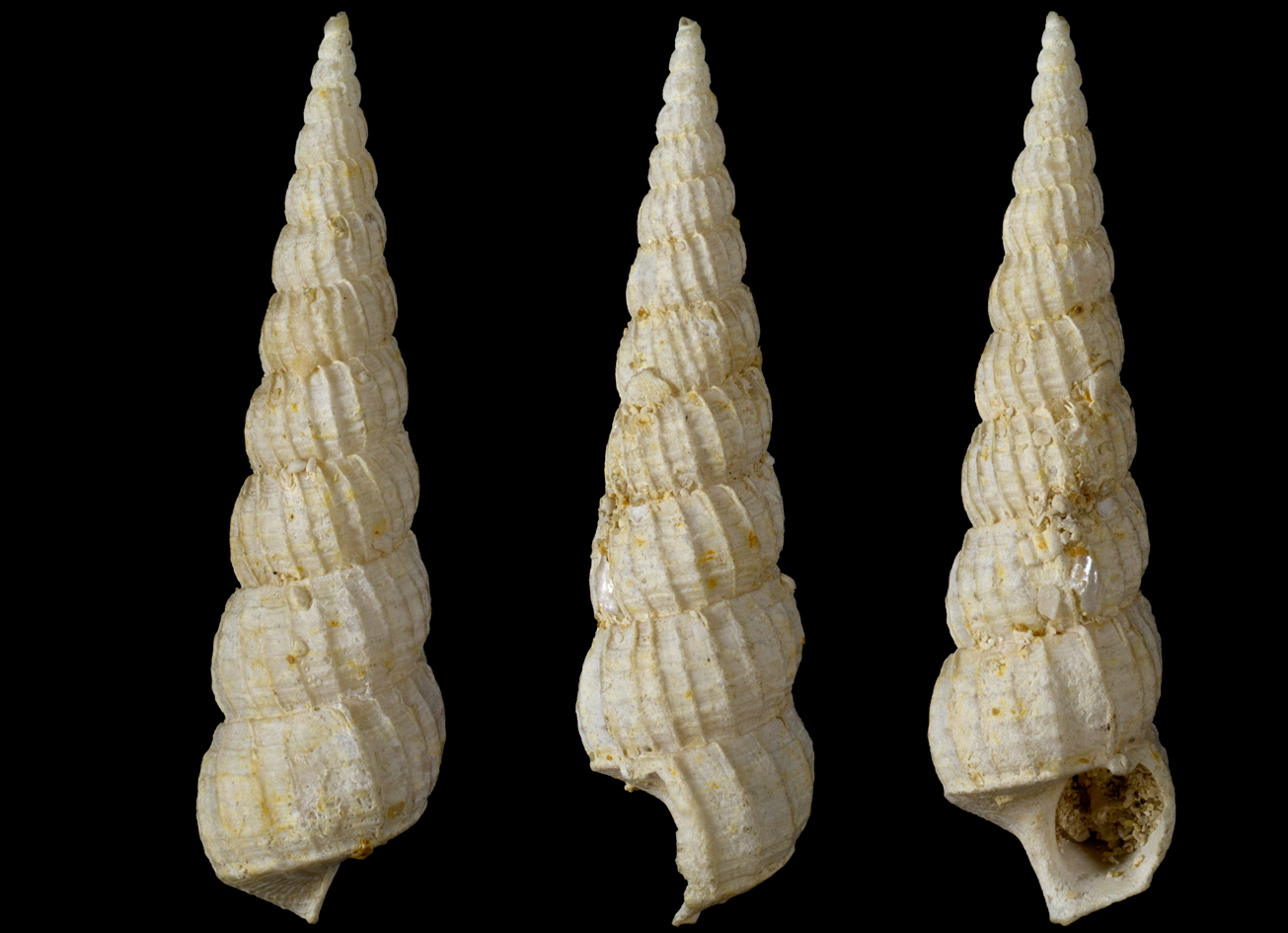
- Shell of † Acrilla perangusta (specimen at the MNHN, Paris)

Scientific classification
- Kingdom: Animalia
- Phylum: Mollusca
- Class: Gastropoda
- Subclass: Caenogastropoda
- Order: incertae sedis
- Superfamily: Epitonioidea
- Family: Epitoniidae
- Genus: Acrilla; H. Adams, 1860

Type species
- Scalaria acuminata G. B. Sowerby II, 1844

Synonyms
- Amaea (Acrilla) H. Adams, 1860; Epitonium (Acrilla) H. Adams, 1860 alternative representation; Scala (Acrilla) H. Adams, 1860; Scalaria (Acrilla) H. Adams, 1860; † Scalaria (Adiscoacrilla) Sacco, 1890 (junior subjective synonym)

= Acrilla =

Genus of gastropods

Acrilla is a genus of predatory sea snails, marine prosobranch gastropod mollusks in the family Epitoniidae. They are commonly known as wentletraps.

== Species ==
- Acrilla acuminata (G. B. Sowerby II, 1844)
- † Acrilla affinis (Deshayes, 1861)
- † Acrilla constantinensis Cossmann & Pissarro, 1902
- † Acrilla crebrilamellata (Tate, 1890)
- † Acrilla cuisensis de Boury, 1887
- † Acrilla desertorum (Wanner, 1902)
- † Acrilla deslongchampsi (de Raincourt & Munier-Chalmas, 1863)
- † Acrilla essomiensis de Boury, 1887
- † Acrilla fayellensis de Boury, 1887
- † Acrilla fourtaui Cossmann, 1901
- † Acrilla gallica de Boury, 1887
- † Acrilla grignonensis (Cossmann, 1888)
- † Acrilla lamberti (Deshayes, 1861)
- † Acrilla leptalea (Tate, 1893)
- Acrilla minor (G. B. Sowerby II, 1873)
- † Acrilla miobronni (Sacco, 1891)
- † Acrilla perangusta (de Boury, 1913)
- † Acrilla phoenix (de Boury, 1913)
- † Acrilla praedecussata de Boury, 1912
- † Acrilla reticulata (Solander in Brander, 1766)
- † Acrilla semicostata (J. Sowerby, 1814)

== Synonyms ==
- Acrilla adenensis Jousseaume, 1912: synonym of Acrilla minor (G. B. Sowerby II, 1873) (junior subjective synonym)
- Acrilla analogica Barnard, 1963: synonym of Plastiscala analogica (Barnard, 1963) (original combination)
- Acrilla cophinodes (Melvill, 1904): synonym of Epitonium cophinodes (Melvill, 1904)
- † Acrilla decussata (Lamarck, 1804) : synonym of † Amaea decussata (Lamarck, 1804)
- Acrilla gracilis H. Adams, 1860: synonym of Scalaria minor G. B. Sowerby II, 1873: synonym of Acrilla minor (G. B. Sowerby II, 1873) (invalid: junior secondary homonym of Scalaria gracilis G.B. Sowerby II, 1844; Scalaria minor G. B. Sowerby II, 1873 is a replacement name.)
- Acrilla hedleyi (de Boury, 1912): synonym of Amaea hedleyi (de Boury, 1912) (superseded combination)
- † Acrilla kaiparaensis Laws, 1944: synonym of † Cylindriscala kaiparaensis (Laws, 1944) (original combination)
- Acrilla natalis Barnard, 1963: synonym of Amaea natalis (Barnard, 1963)
- Acrilla recreata (de Boury, 1919): synonym of Epitonium kraussi (Nyst, 1873)
- Acrilla thalia Bartsch, 1915: synonym of Acrilla minor (G. B. Sowerby II, 1873) (junior synonym)
- † Acrilla weigandi (Böse, 1910) : synonym of † Amaea ferminiana (Dall, 1908)
