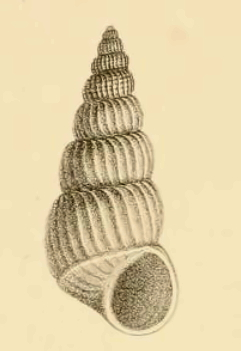
- Shell of Acrilla deslongchampsi (holotype)

Scientific classification
- Kingdom: Animalia
- Phylum: Mollusca
- Class: Gastropoda
- Subclass: Caenogastropoda
- Order: incertae sedis
- Superfamily: Epitonioidea
- Family: Epitoniidae
- Genus: Acrilla
- Species: †A. deslongchampsi

Binomial name
- †Acrilla deslongchampsi (de Raincourt & Munier-Chalmas, 1863)

Synonyms
- † Amaea (Acrilla) deslongchampsi (de Raincourt & Munier-Chalmas, 1863) superseded combination; † Scalaria deslongchampsi de Raincourt & Munier-Chalmas, 1863 superseded combination

= Acrilla deslongchampsi =

Species of gastropod

Acrilla deslongchampsi is an extinct species of sea snail, a marine gastropod mollusk in the family Epitoniidae, the wentletraps.

== Description ==
The length of the shell is up to 12 mm, its diameter 5 mm.

(Original description in French) The elongated shell is turbinate, turriculate and acuminate at its top. It contains nine convex whorls, decorated with longitudinal, equal, projecting ribs, strongly curved towards the suture, having, as a whole, the general shape of an S. The interstices of the ribs are smooth. The suture is deep. The body whorl is similar to the others, carrying at its base a disc whose straight, projecting radiations correspond to the transverse ribs. The simple aperture is round.

== Distribution ==
Fossils of this marine species have been found in Eocene strata in Val-d'Oise, France.
