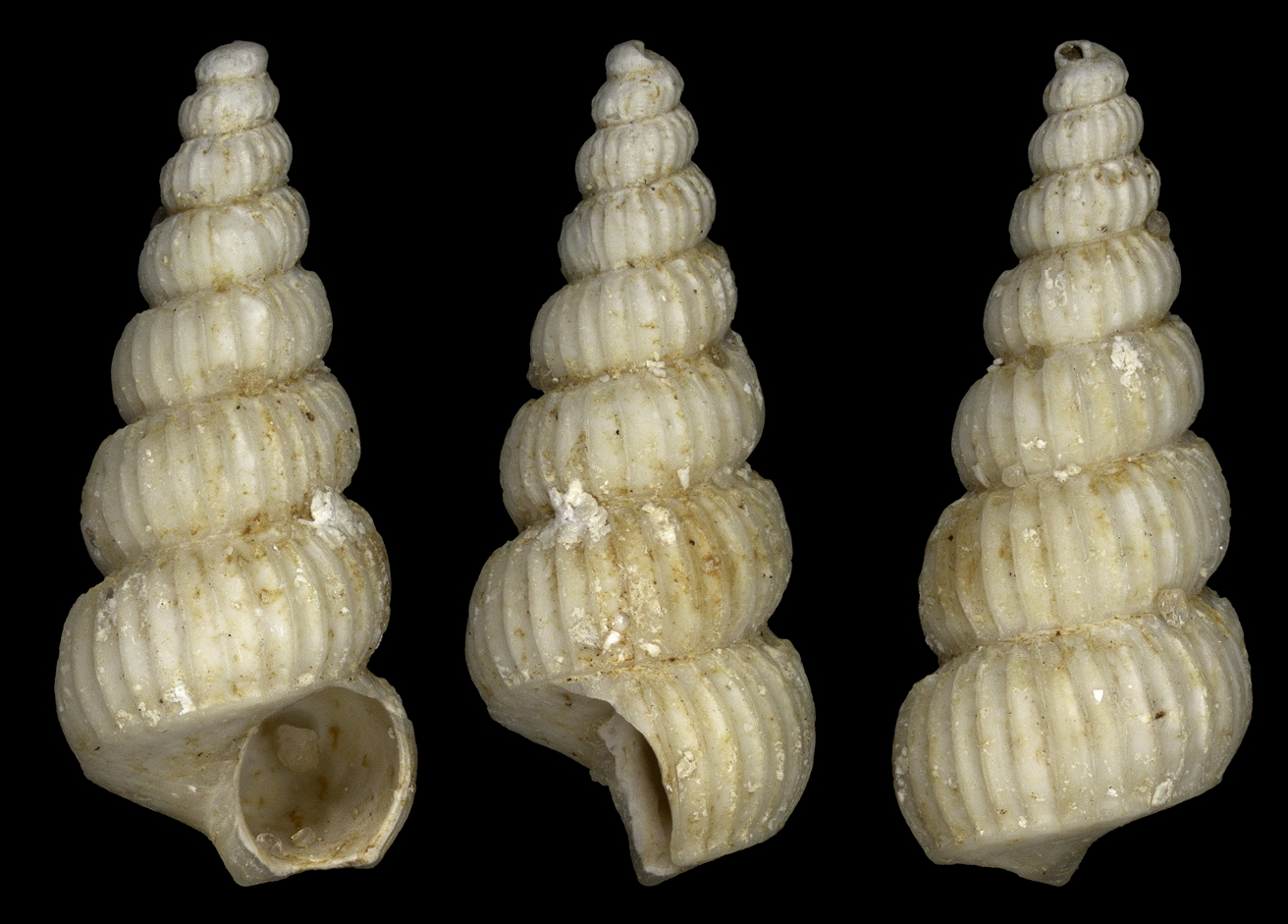
- Shell of † Acrilla semicostata (specimen at MNHN, Paris)

Scientific classification
- Kingdom: Animalia
- Phylum: Mollusca
- Class: Gastropoda
- Subclass: Caenogastropoda
- Order: incertae sedis
- Superfamily: Epitonioidea
- Family: Epitoniidae
- Genus: Acrilla
- Species: †A. semicostata

Binomial name
- †Acrilla semicostata (J. Sowerby, 1814)

Synonyms
- † Amaea (Acrilla) semicostata (J.Sowerby, 1814) superseded combination; † Scalaria semicostata J. Sowerby, 1814 superseded combination

= Acrilla semicostata =

Species of gastropod

Acrilla semicostata is an extinct species of sea snail, a marine gastropod mollusk in the family Epitoniidae, the wentletraps.

== Description ==
(Original description) The seven whorls are contiguous. The spire is transversely striated with numerous, slightly raised ribs. The lower part of each whorl is smooth and naked. The ribs scarcely cover two-thirds of each whorl.

== Distribution ==
Fossils of this marine species have been found in Eocene strata in Val-d'Oise, France and in Barton on Sea, Great-Britain.
