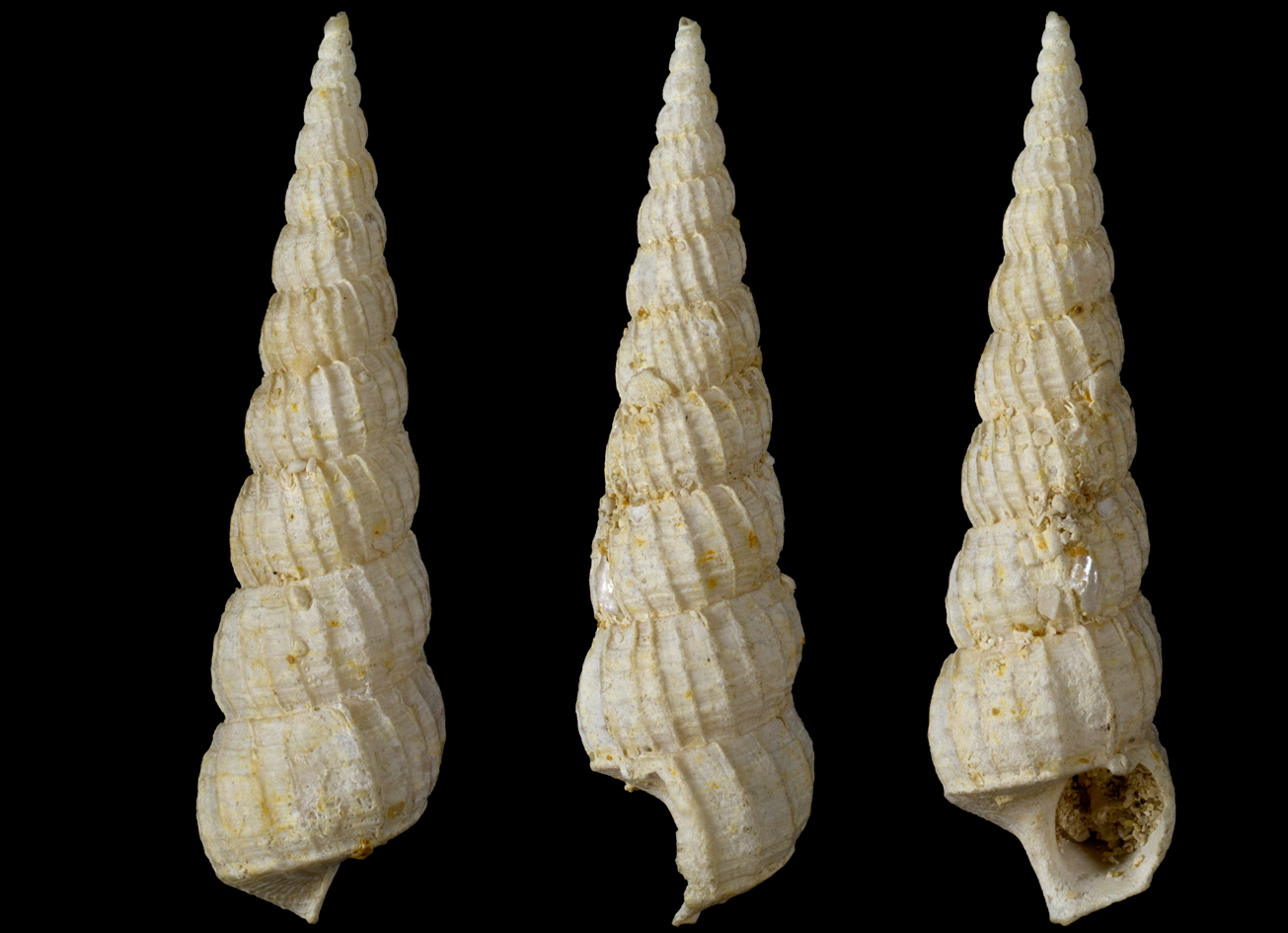
- Shells of Acrilla perangusta (specimen at MNHN, Paris)

Scientific classification
- Kingdom: Animalia
- Phylum: Mollusca
- Class: Gastropoda
- Subclass: Caenogastropoda
- Order: incertae sedis
- Superfamily: Epitonioidea
- Family: Epitoniidae
- Genus: Acrilla
- Species: †A. perangusta

Binomial name
- †Acrilla perangusta (de Boury, 1913)

Synonyms
- † Amaea (Acrilla) perangusta (de Boury, 1913) superseded combination; Scalaria (Acrilla) perangusta de Boury, 1913; † Scalaria angusta Deshayes, 1861 junior homonym; † Scalaria perangusta de Boury, 1913 superseded combination

= Acrilla perangusta =

Species of gastropod

Acrilla perangusta is an extinct species of sea snail, a marine gastropod mollusk in the family Epitoniidae, the wentletraps.

== Distribution ==
Fossils of this marine species have been found in Eocene strata in Yvelines, France.
