= Gallic =

Gallic is an adjective that may describe:

- ancient Gaul (Latin: Gallia), roughly corresponding to the territory of modern France
  - pertaining to the Gauls
  - Roman Gaul (1st century BC to 5th century)
  - Gallic Empire (260–273)
  - Frankish Gaul (5th to 8th centuries)
  - A Latinism for France, the French people, and their customs
- Gallic epoch, an obsolete epoch of the Cretaceous
- pertaining to gall, a formation induced by a parasite in plants,
  - hence the name gallic acid, for a phenolic compound found in these formations

'Gallic' is also a proper noun naming the following ships:

- SS Gallic (1894), a paddle wheel steamship
- SS Gallic (1918), a cargo steamship

== See also ==
- Gaulish
- Gallican
- Galician (disambiguation)
- Gaelic (disambiguation)
- Gallium, a chemical element
- Galik script, a variation of the traditional Mongolian script
- Gallica (disambiguation)
- Gallicism, a word, phrase, idiom, or grammatical structure borrowed from the French language
