= Gallican =

Gallican may refer to:

- Gallican Church (French: Église gallicane), a term referring to the Catholic Church in France
- Église gallicane, a Catholic denomination founded in 1869 by Hyacinthe Loyson
- Gallicanism, a doctrince that civil authority over the Catholic Church is comparable to that of the pope
- Gallican Psalter or Psalterium Gallicanum, one of Jerome's Latin translations of the book of Psalms
- Gallican Rite, a 1st-millennium Christian liturgy and other ritual practices in Western Christianity
  - Gallican chant, the liturgical plainchant repertory of the Gallican rite
- Gallican, a largely obsolete synonym of Gallic, referring to:
  - France, a country in Western Europe
    - French people, the majority demographic group of France
    - French language, the majority language of France
- Gallican, a largely obsolete synonym of Gaulish, referring to:
  - Gaul, ancient nation encompassing modern-day France and parts of surrounding countries
    - Gauls, the principal people of Gaul
    - Gaulish language, spoken by the Gauls
    - Roman Gaul, provincial rule of Gaul within the Roman Empire, 1st century BCE to 5th century CE

== See also ==
- Gallic (disambiguation)
- Gallica
