= Papuliscala superlata =

Scientific classification
- Kingdom: Animalia
- Phylum: Mollusca
- Class: Gastropoda
- Subclass: Caenogastropoda
- Order: incertae sedis
- Family: Epitoniidae
- Genus: Papuliscala
- Species: P. superlata

Binomial name
- Papuliscala superlata (Finlay, 1930)

Synonyms
- Murdochella superlata Finlay, 1930

Species of gastropod

Papuliscala superlata is a species of small sea snail, a marine gastropod mollusc or micromollusc in the family Epitoniidae.

== Distribution ==
This marine species is found around North Island, New Zealand.
