= Spallanzania =

Scientific classification
- Kingdom: Animalia
- Phylum: Arthropoda
- Clade: Pancrustacea
- Class: Insecta
- Order: Diptera
- Family: Tachinidae
- Subfamily: Exoristinae
- Tribe: Goniini
- Genus: Spallanzania; Robineau-Desvoidy, 1830

Type species
- Spallanzania gallica Robineau-Desvoidy, 1830

Synonyms
- Acroglossa Williston, 1889; Cnephalia Rondani, 1856; Cnephaliodes Brauer & von Berganstamm, 1891; Cnephaliops Townsend, 1915; Cnephalomyia Townsend, 1911; Gnephalia Lioy, 1864; Imaguncula Reinhard, 1958; Neacroglossa Townsend, 1927; Neocroglossa Guimarães, 1971; Spaanzania Schiner, 1868

Genus of flies

Spallanzania is a genus of flies in the family Tachinidae.

== Species ==
- Spallanzania brasiliensis (Townsend, 1927)
- Spallanzania colludens Reinhard, 1958
- Spallanzania finitima (Snow, 1895)
- Spallanzania floridana (Townsend, 1911)
- Spallanzania griseiventris Herting, 1967
- Spallanzania hebes (Fallén, 1820)
- Spallanzania hesperidarum (Williston, 1889)
- Spallanzania multisetosa (Rondani, 1859)
- Spallanzania onusta (Wulp, 1890)
- Spallanzania quadrimaculata Herting, 1967
- Spallanzania rectistylum (Macquart, 1847)
- Spallanzania sillemi (Baranov, 1935)
- Spallanzania sparipruinatus Chao & Shi, 1982
- Spallanzania tabida (Reinhard, 1958)
- Spallanzania vetula (Reinhard, 1964)
