= Gallico =

Gallico is a surname. Notable people with the surname include:

- Elisha Gallico (died c. 1583), Palestinian Jewish Talmudist
- Paul Gallico (1897–1976), American novelist

== See also ==
- Gallica (disambiguation)
