= Mordellistena gallica =

Scientific classification
- Domain: Eukaryota
- Kingdom: Animalia
- Phylum: Arthropoda
- Class: Insecta
- Order: Coleoptera
- Suborder: Polyphaga
- Infraorder: Cucujiformia
- Family: Mordellidae
- Genus: Mordellistena
- Species: M. gallica

Binomial name
- Mordellistena gallica Ermisch, 1956

Species of beetle

Mordellistena gallica is a beetle in the genus Mordellistena of the family Mordellidae. It was described in 1956 by Ermisch.
