= Ulmus 'Gallica' =

Elm cultivar

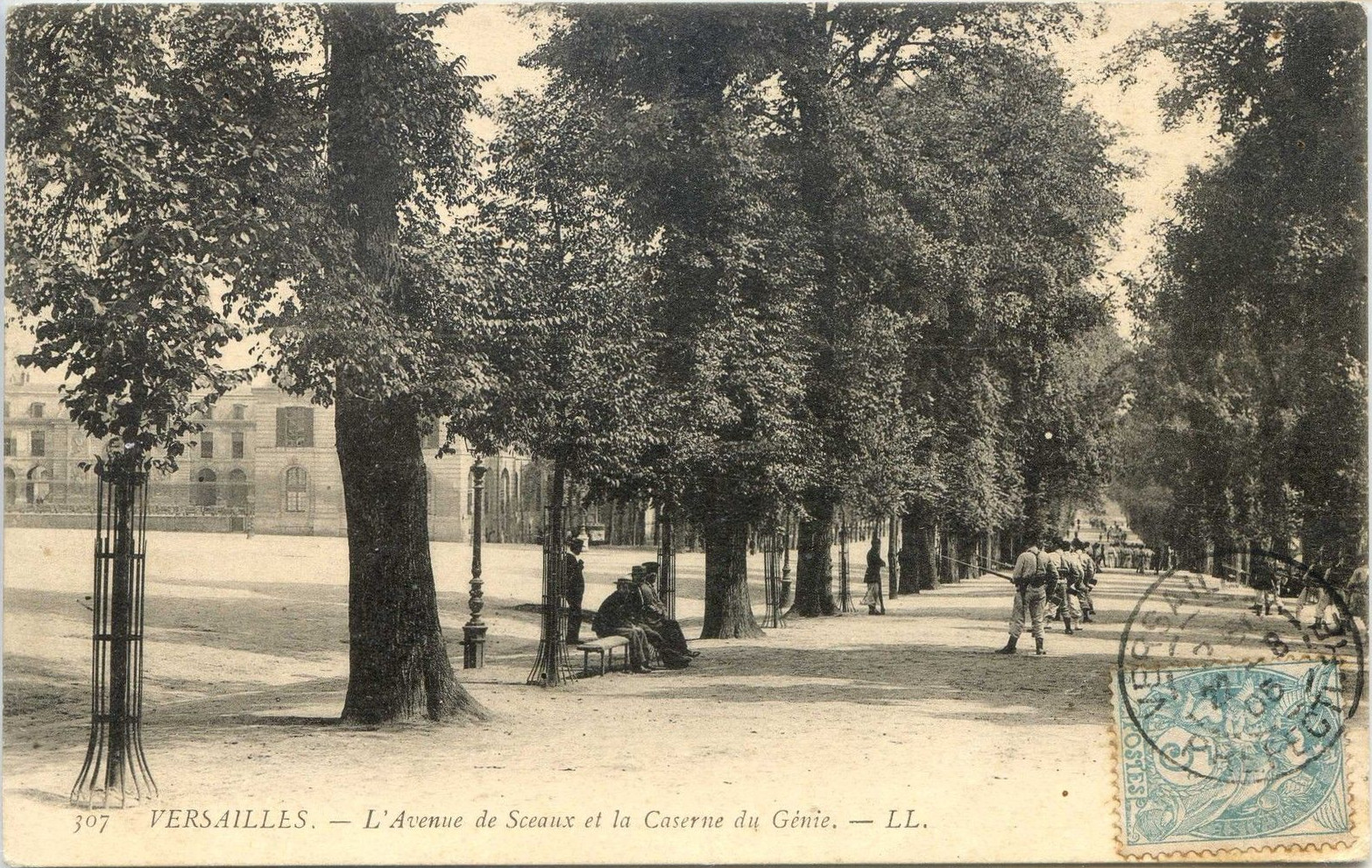
- L'Avenue de Sceaux and the Caserne du Génie, Versailles
- Genus: Ulmus
- Cultivar: 'Gallica'
- Origin: France

The elm cultivar Ulmus 'Gallica' (Chev.) was described as U. gallica by Auguste Chevalier in 'Les Ormes de France' (1942). A probable hybrid by its suckering habit, it was said to be an elm of central and north-west France and the Paris area. The type tree was said by Déséglise to be seen in Bourges.

== Description ==
A medium-sized suckering elm, not dome-shaped, with upright semi-fastigiate, spreading branching. Leaves largish, oval-elliptic (12–15 cm x 6–9 cm), leathery, asymmetric at base, abruptly acuminated, deep-toothed below the apex, sometimes tricuspidate, with short white-downy petioles. Large samara (up to 2.3 x 1.8 cm); seed central.

== Cultivation ==
Chevalier noted that the tree was sometimes planted in avenues, including the Avenue de Sceaux at Versailles. The large-leaved elms of the Boulevard Saint-Michel, Paris, praised by William Robinson in his Parks and Gardens of Paris (1883), match the description of Chevalier's 'Gallica'.

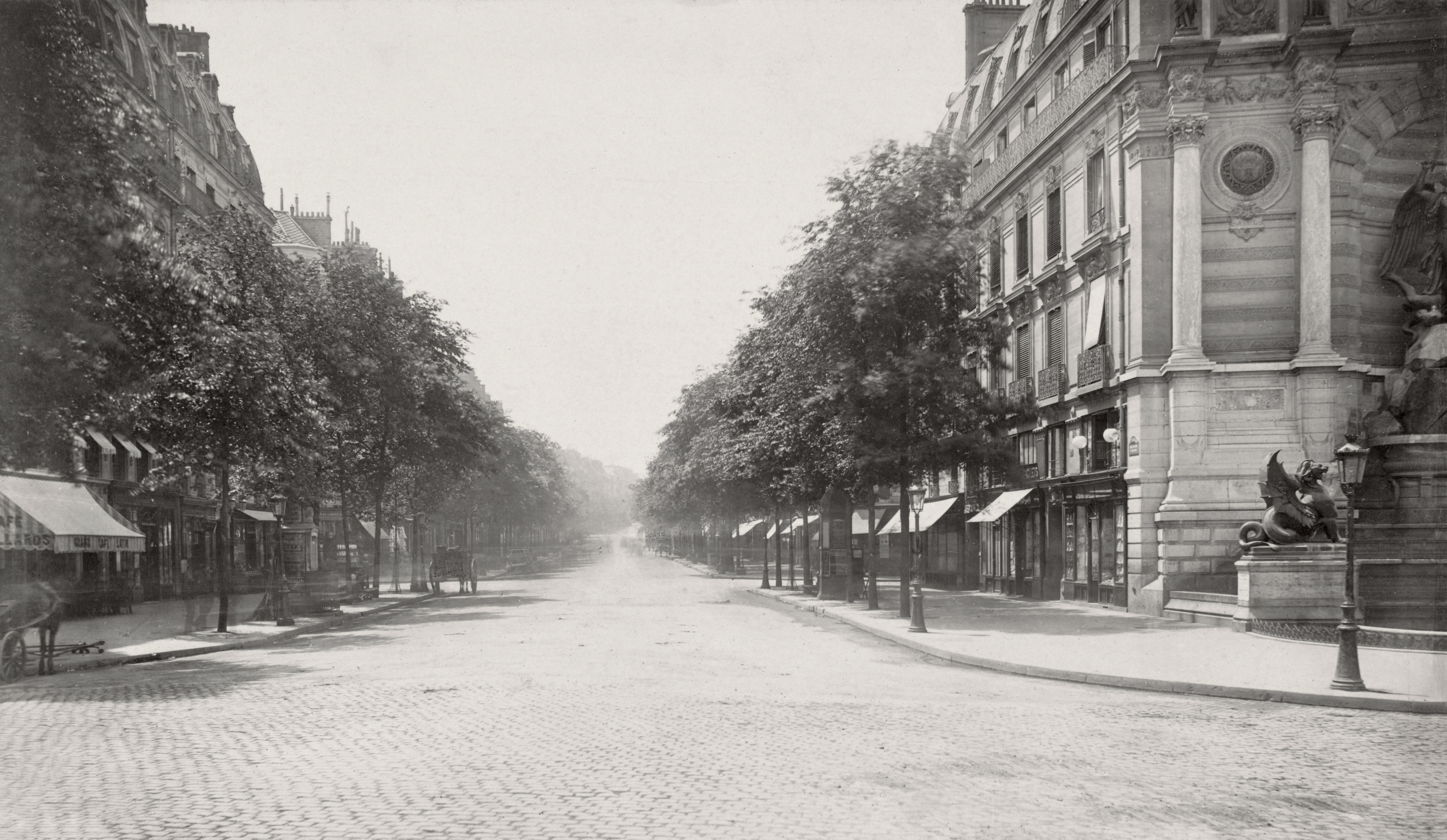
Elm avenue, Boulevard Saint-Michel, Paris, late 19th century

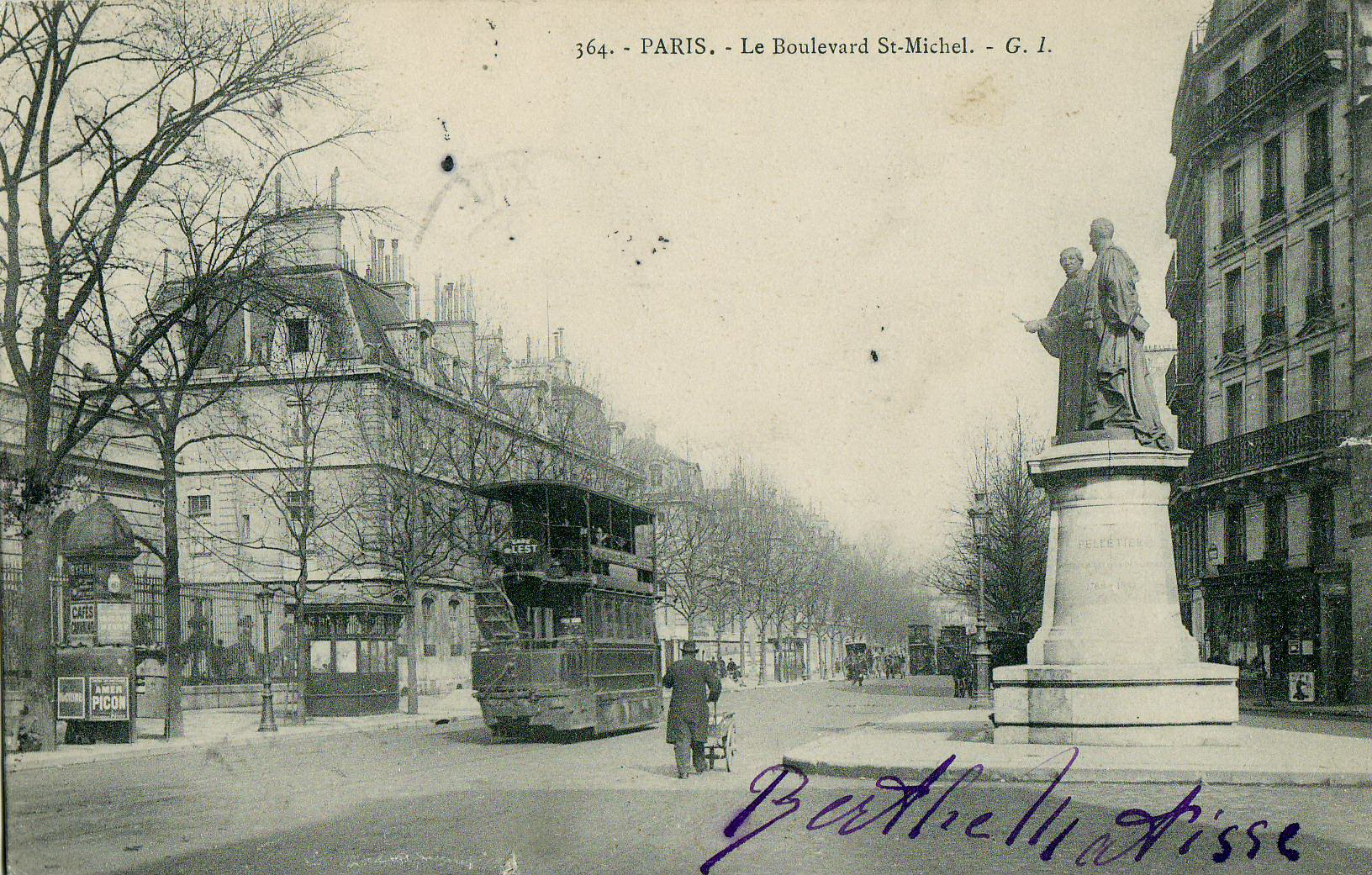
Elm avenue, Boulevard Saint-Michel, Paris, early 20th century
