= Spallanzania hebes =

Scientific classification
- Kingdom: Animalia
- Phylum: Arthropoda
- Class: Insecta
- Order: Diptera
- Family: Tachinidae
- Subfamily: Exoristinae
- Tribe: Goniini
- Genus: Spallanzania
- Species: S. hebes

Binomial name
- Spallanzania hebes (Fallén, 1820)

Synonyms
- Cnephalia bisetosa Brauer & von Berganstamm, 1891; Cnephalia pansa Snow, 1895; Cnephaliodes perversus Brauer & von Berganstamm, 1891; Gonia nudifacies Macquart, 1834; Spallanzania gallica Robineau-Desvoidy, 1830; Tachina bucephala Meigen, 1824

Species of fly

Spallanzania hebes is a genus of flies in the family Tachinidae.

== Distribution ==
Canada, United States, Mexico, Tajikistan, Turkmenistan, Uzbekistan, Czech Republic, Estonia, Hungary, Moldova, Poland, Romania, Slovakia, Ukraine, Finland, Sweden, Bulgaria, Corse, Croatia, Cyprus, Greece, Italy, Serbia, Slovenia, Spain, Turkey, Austria, Belgium, France, Germany, Switzerland, Kazakhstan, Iran, Israel, Mongolia, Russia, Azerbaijan, China, India
