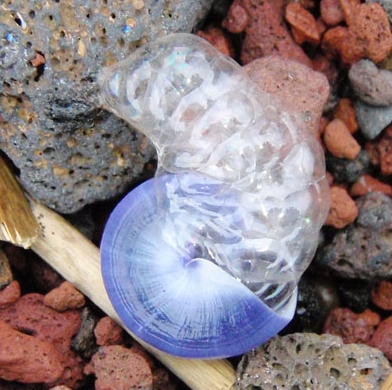
- Janthina janthina

Scientific classification
- Domain: Eukaryota
- Kingdom: Animalia
- Phylum: Mollusca
- Class: Gastropoda
- Subclass: Caenogastropoda
- Superfamily: Epitonioidea; Berry, S.S., 1910

Families
- See text.

= Epitonioidea =

Superfamily of gastropods

Epitonioidea is a superfamily of planktonic and ectoparasitic sea snails, marine gastropod molluscs within the informal group Ptenoglossa. This superfamily includes the wentletraps and the purple snails.

== Taxonomy ==
Families and subfamilies within this superfamily are as follows:

- Family Epitoniidae S.S. Berry, 1910, the wentletraps and purple snails
- Family Nystiellidae Clench & Turner, 1952
