= Sea slug =

Group of marine gastropods

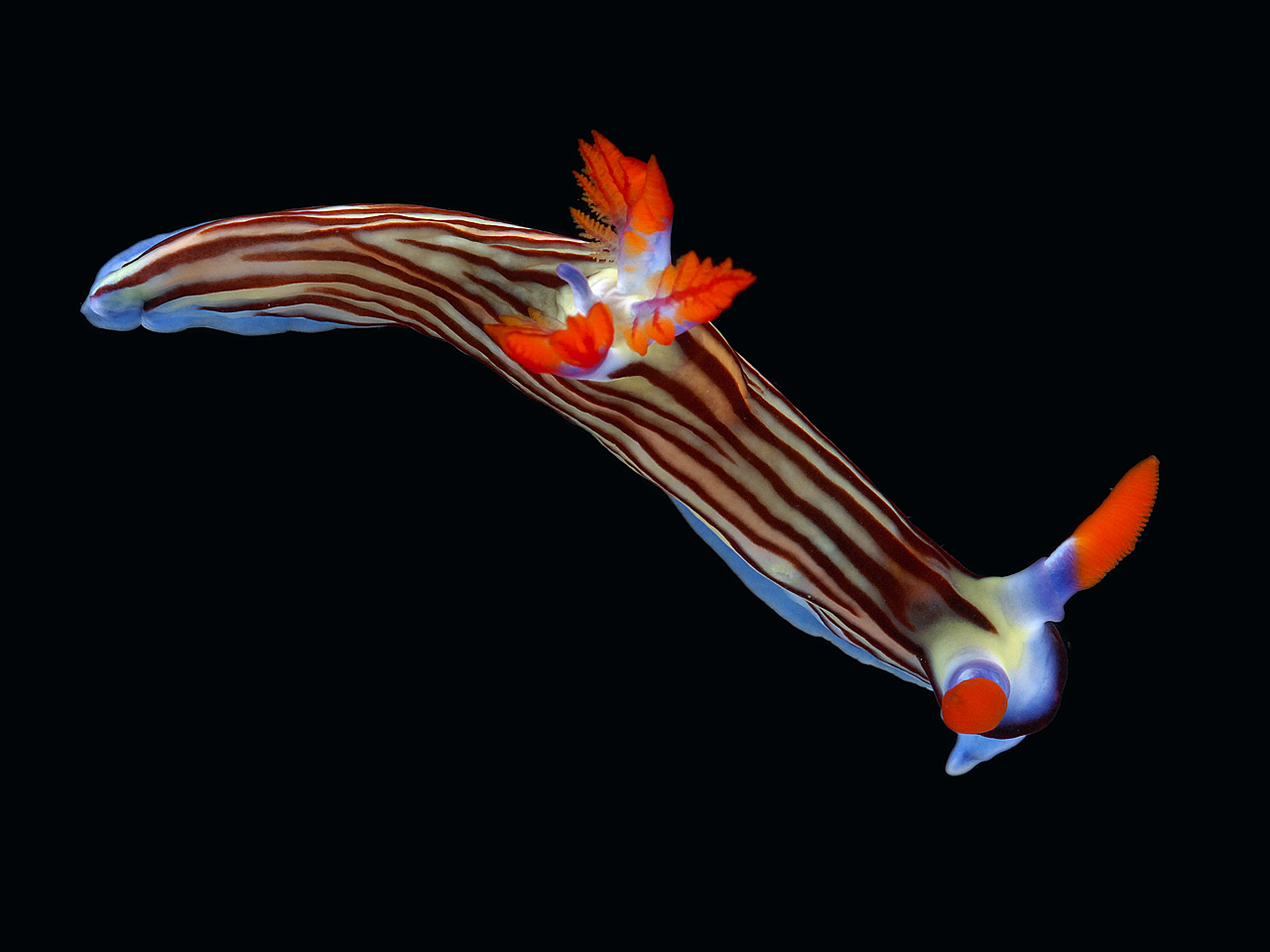
The nudibranch Nembrotha aurea is a gastropod.

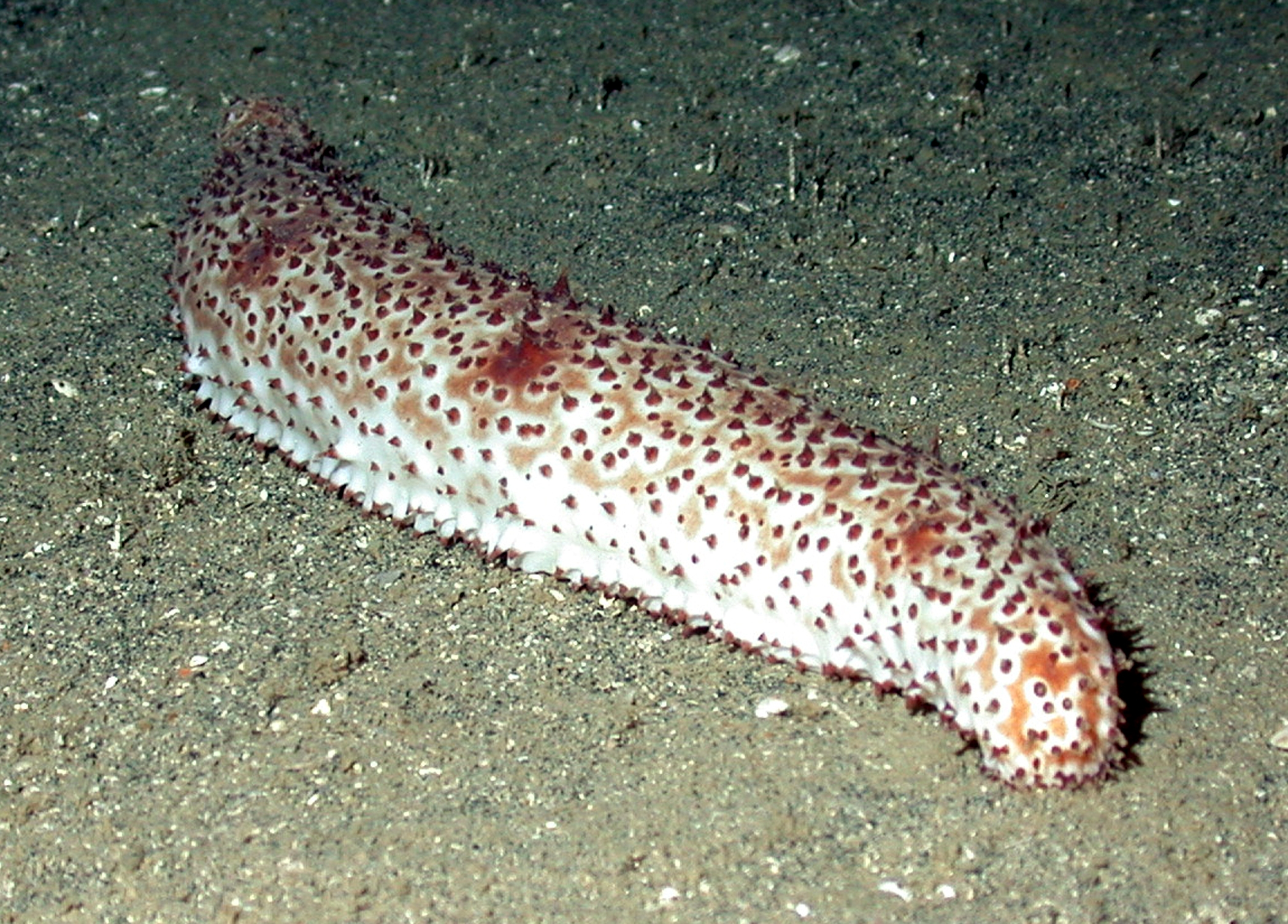
A sea cucumber also looks slug-like and is sometimes loosely called a "sea slug", but it is not a gastropod.

Sea slug is a common name for some marine invertebrates with varying levels of resemblance to terrestrial slugs. Most creatures known as sea slugs are gastropods, i.e. they are sea snails (marine gastropod mollusks) that, over evolutionary time, have either entirely lost their shells or have seemingly lost their shells due to having a significantly reduced or internal shell. The name "sea slug" is often applied to nudibranchs and a paraphyletic set of other marine gastropods without apparent shells.

Sea slugs have an enormous variation in body shape, color, and size. Most are partially translucent. The often-bright colors of reef-dwelling species imply that these animals are under constant threat of predators. The color can warn other animals of the sea slug's toxic stinging cells (nematocysts) or offensive taste. Like all gastropods, they have small, razor-sharp teeth called radulas. Most sea slugs have a pair of rhinophores—sensory tentacles used primarily for the sense of smell—on their head, with a small eye at the base of each rhinophore. Many have feathery structures (cerata) on the back, often in a contrasting color, which act as gills. All species of genuine sea slugs have a selected prey animal on which they depend for food, including certain jellyfish, bryozoans, sea anemones, plankton, and other species of sea slugs.

Sea slugs have brains. For example, Aplysia californica has a brain of about 20,000 nerve cells.

== Shell-less marine gastropods ==
The name "sea slug" is often applied to numerous different evolutionary lineages of marine gastropod molluscs or sea snails, specifically those gastropods that are either not conchiferous (shell-bearing) or appear not to be. In evolutionary terms, losing the shell altogether, having a small internal shell, or having a shell so small that the soft parts of the animal cannot retract into it, are all features that have evolved many times independently within the class Gastropoda, on land and in the sea; these features often cause a gastropod to be labeled with the common name "slug".

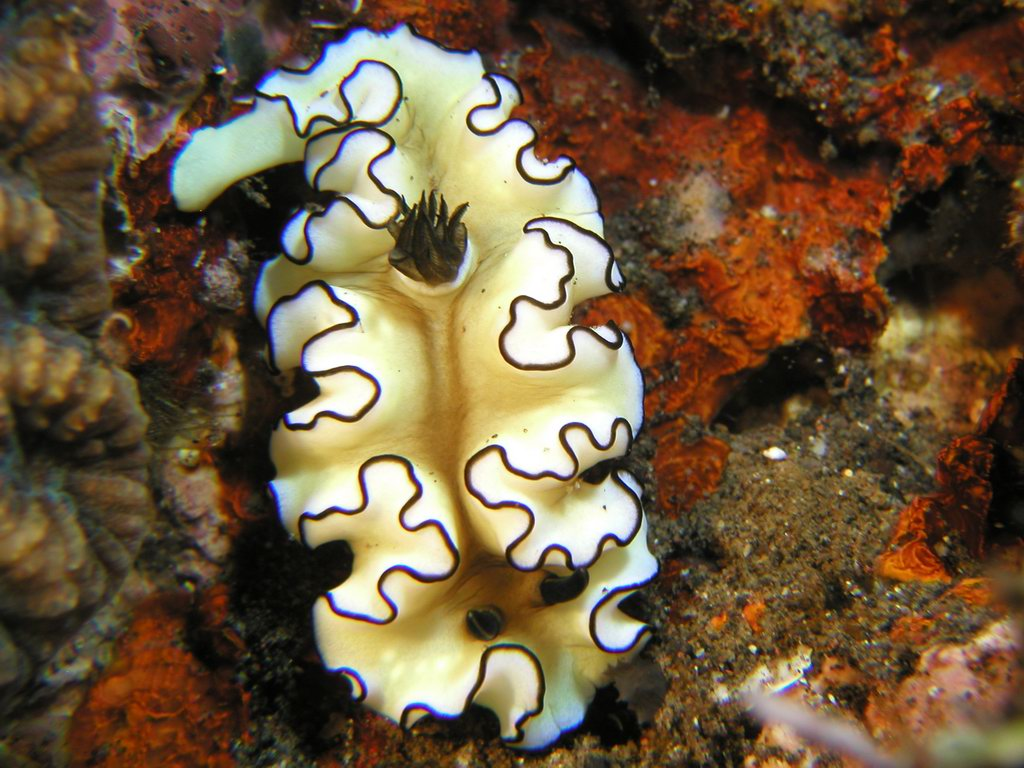
The nudibranch Glossodoris atromarginata

Nudibranchs (clade Nudibranchia) are a large group of marine gastropods that have no shell at all. These may be the most familiar sort of sea slug. Although most nudibranchs are not large, they are often very eye-catching because so many species have brilliant coloration. In addition to nudibranchs, a number of other taxa of marine gastropods (some easily mistaken for nudibranchs) are also often called "sea slugs".

=== Gastropod groups ===
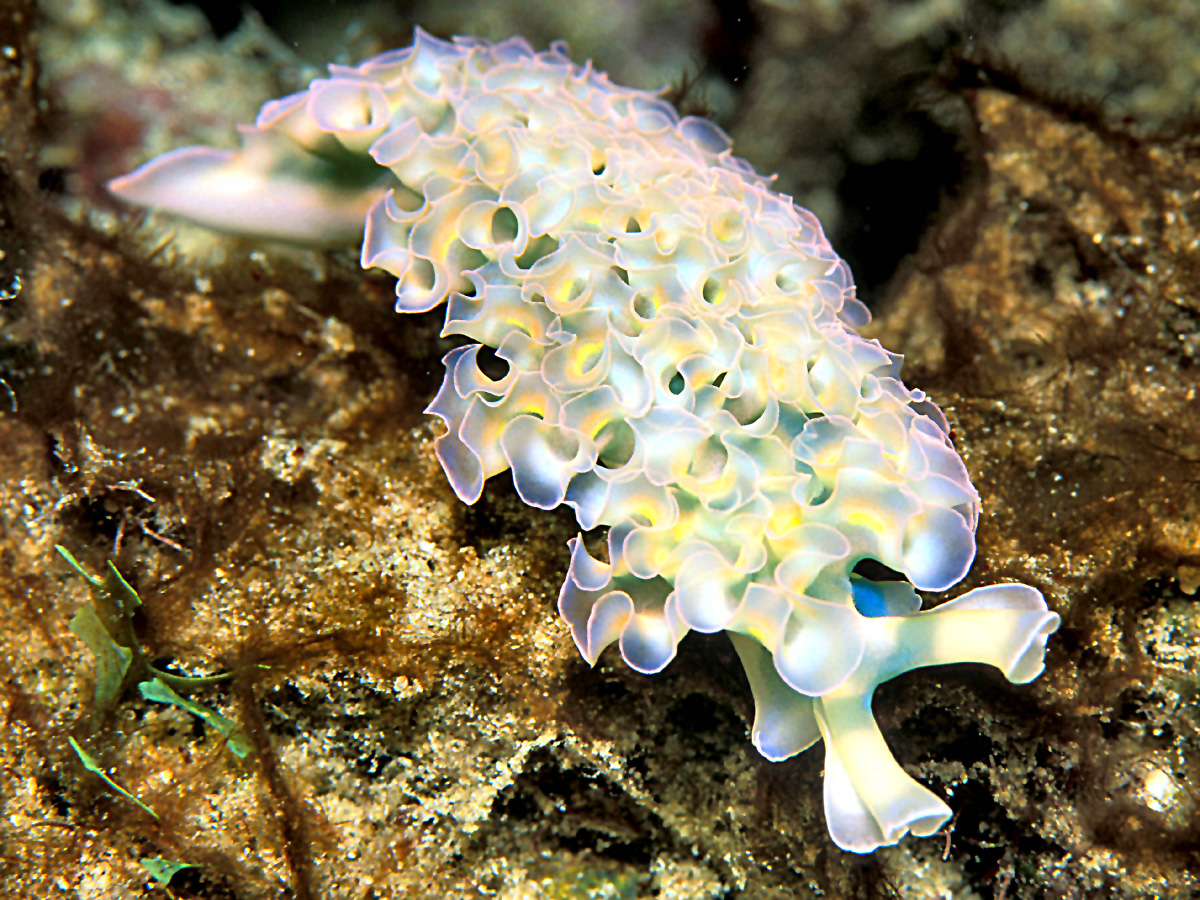
The sacoglossan Elysia crispata

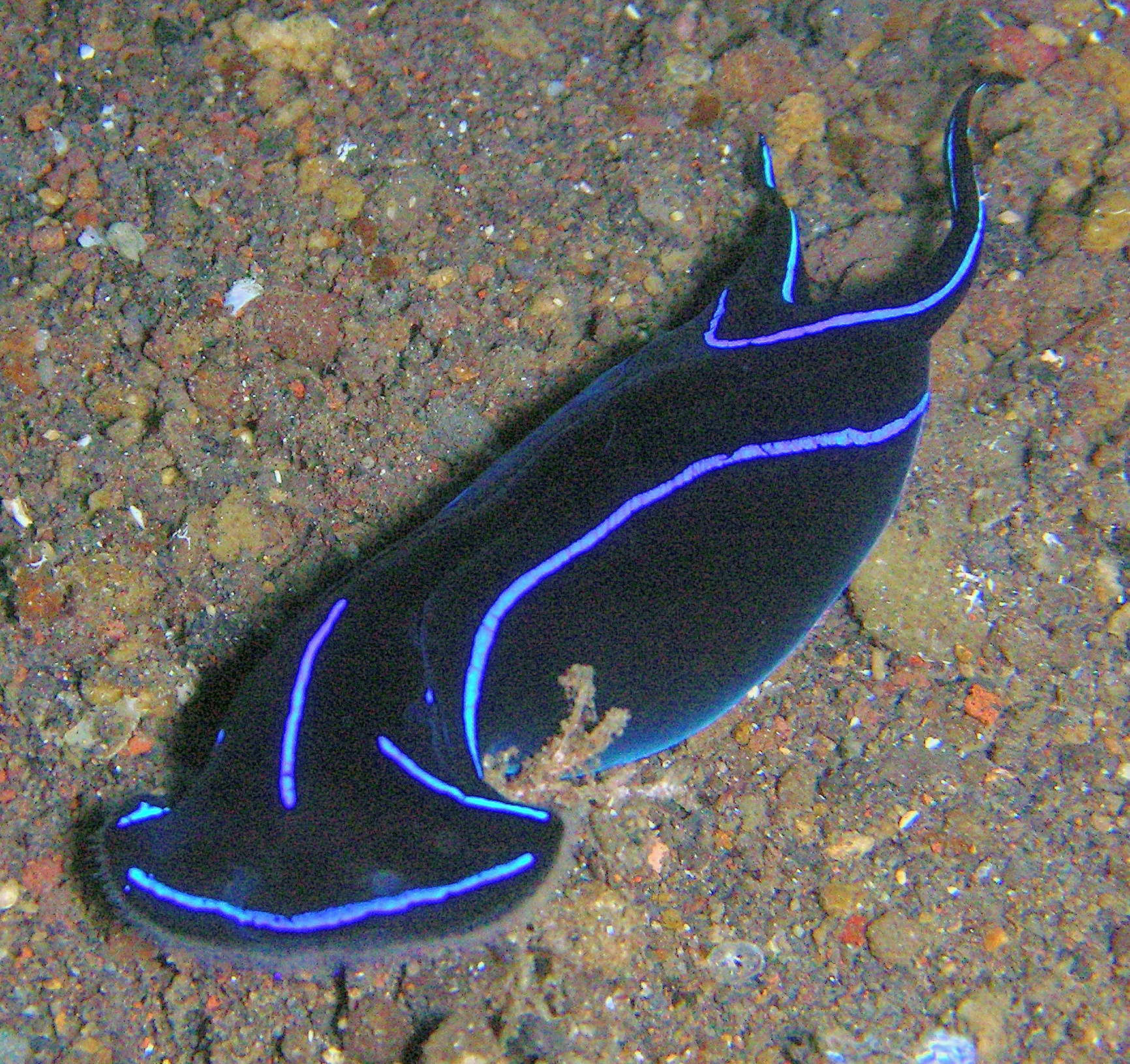
The cephalaspidean Chelidonura varians

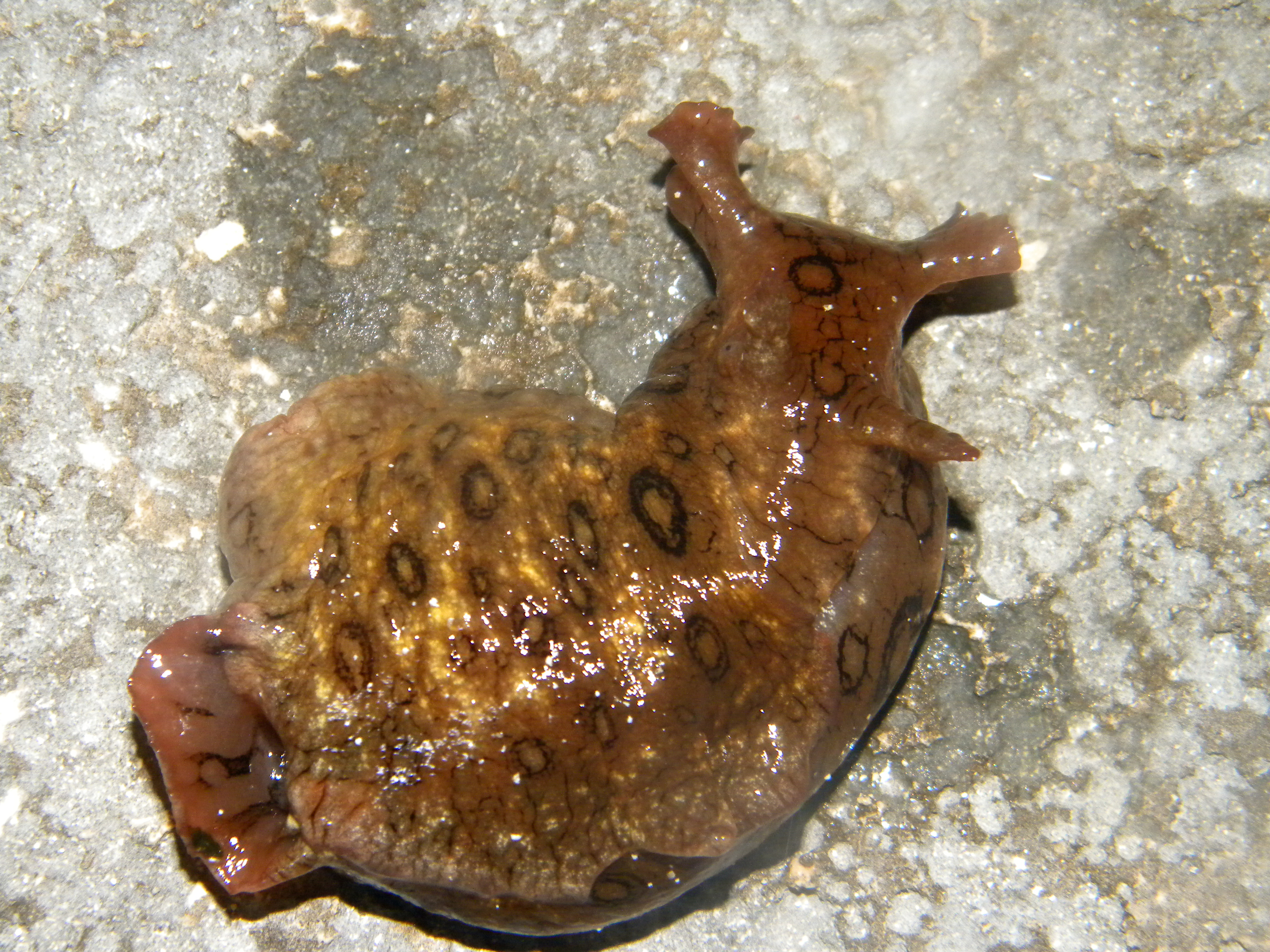
The sea hare Aplysia dactylomela, photographed out of water

Within various groups of gastropods that are called "sea slugs", numerous families are within the informal taxonomic group Opisthobranchia. The term "sea slug" is perhaps most often applied to nudibranchs, many of which are brightly patterned and conspicuously ornate. The name "sea slug" is also often applied to the sacoglossans (clade Sacoglossa), the so-called sap-sucking or solar-powered sea slugs which are frequently a shade of green.

Another group of main gastropods that are often labeled as "sea slugs" are the various families of headshield slugs and bubble snails within the clade Cephalaspidea. The sea hares, clade Aplysiomorpha, have a small, flat, proteinaceous internal shell. The clades Thecosomata and Gymnosomata are small pelagic gastropods known as "sea butterflies" and "sea angels" respectively. Many species of sea butterflies retain their shells. These are commonly known as "pteropods" but are also sometimes called sea slugs; especially the Gymnosomata, which have no shell as adults.

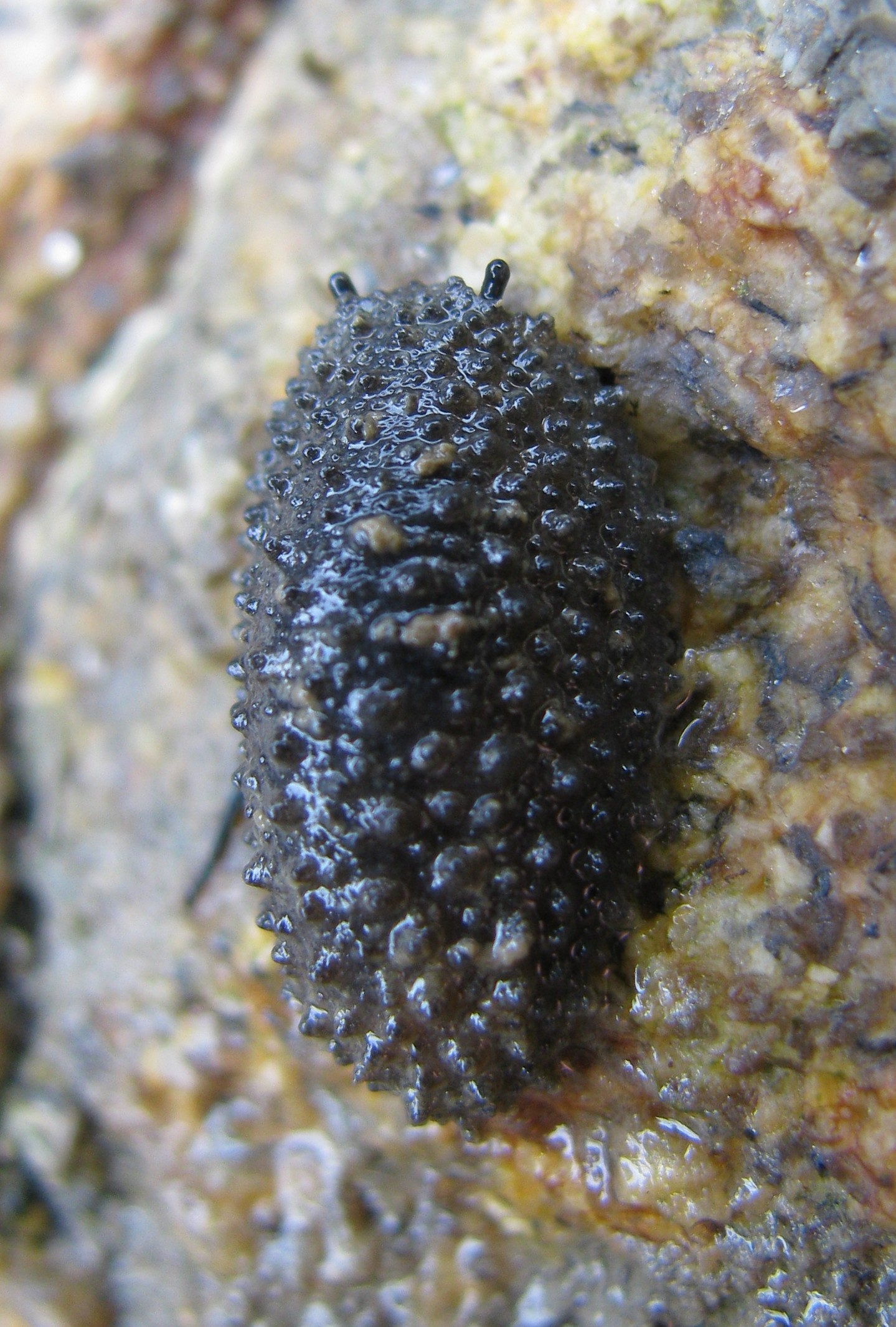
The marine pulmonate Onchidella celtica

There is also one group of "sea slugs" within the informal group Pulmonata. One very unusual group of marine gastropods that are shell-less are the pulmonate (air-breathing) species in the family Onchidiidae, within the clade Systellommatophora.

== Diversity in sea slugs ==
Like many nudibranchs, species in the genus Glaucus, such as Glaucus atlanticus, can store and use stinging cells, or nematocysts, from its prey (Portuguese men o' war, blue buttons and by-the-wind sailors) in its finger-like cerata. Other species, like the Pyjama slug Chromodoris quadricolor, may use their striking colors to advertise their foul chemical taste.

The lettuce sea slug (Elysia crispata) has lettuce-like ruffles that line its body. This slug, like other Sacoglossa, uses kleptoplasty, a process in which the slug absorbs chloroplasts from the algae it eats, and uses "stolen" cells to photosynthesize sugars. The ruffles of the lettuce sea slug increase the slug's surface area, allowing the cells to absorb more light.

Headshield slugs, like the Chelidonura varians, use their shovel-shaped heads to dig into the sand, where they spend most of their time. The shield also prevents sand from entering the mantle during burrowing.

Peronia indica is a species of air-breathing sea slug, a shell-less marine pulmonate gastropod mollusk in the family Onchidiidae.

The largest species of sea hare, the California black sea hare, Aplysia vaccaria can reach a length of 75 centimetres (30 in) and a weight of 14 kilograms (31 lb). Most sea hares have several defenses; in addition to being naturally toxic, they can eject a foul ink or secrete a viscous slime to deter predators.

Some species of acochlidian sea slugs have made evolutionary transitions to living in freshwater streams and there is at least one evolutionary transition to land.
