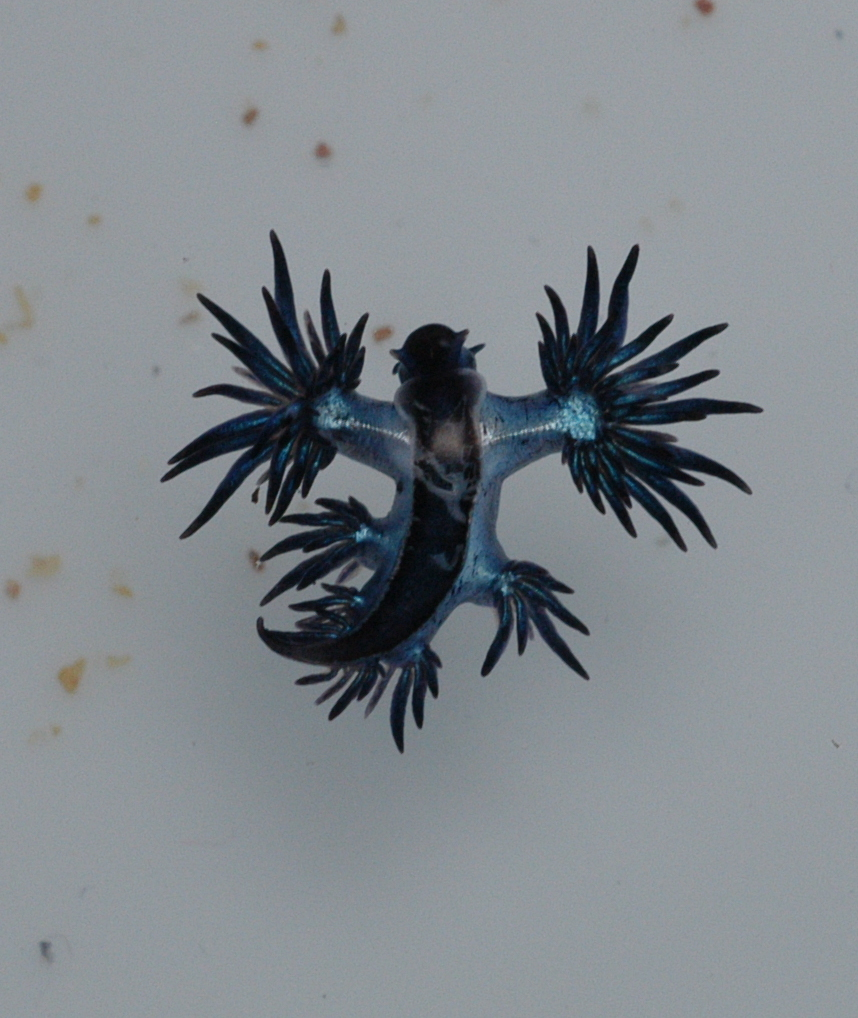

Scientific classification
- Kingdom: Animalia
- Phylum: Mollusca
- Class: Gastropoda
- Order: Nudibranchia
- Suborder: Aeolidacea
- Family: Glaucidae
- Genus: Glaucus
- Species: G. marginatus

Binomial name
- Glaucus marginatus (Reinhardt & Bergh, 1864)

Synonyms
- Glaucilla briarea (Reinhardt & Bergh, 1864); Glaucilla marginata (Reinhardt & Bergh, 1864) (original combination)

= Glaucus marginatus =

Species of gastropod

Glaucus marginatus is a species of small, floating, blue sea slug; a pelagic (open-ocean) aeolid nudibranch; a marine opisthobranch gastropod mollusc in the family Glaucidae. This species is closely related to Glaucus atlanticus, and is part of a species complex (Informal clade Marginatus) along with Glaucus bennettae, Glaucus thompsoni, and Glaucus mcfarlanei. Like Glaucus atlanticus, it is commonly known as a blue dragon.

== Description ==
This nudibranch is dark blue, and in many ways it resembles a smaller version of Glaucus atlanticus. However, in this species the cerata are inserted in multiple series presenting an irregular arrangement (compared to single series in G. atlanticus). The first two groups of cerata are pedunculate with a long stalk. The last two groups are sessile and partially fused.

While G. atlanticus is up to 3–4 centimetres (1.2–1.6 in) long, G. marginata is shorter relatively, and its tail is shorter than its cousin. The species has a dark blue foot that is broad and well developed and cerata are dark blue with small light blue spots .

== Distribution ==
This species is pelagic, and can be found in the Pacific Ocean.

While they do not usually inhabit coastal regions, hundreds of the creatures were observed washing up on one of Sydney’s Northern Beaches, near Long Reef, in February 2021.

== Habitat and behaviour ==
These small nudibranches float upside down on the surface tension in temperate and tropical seas. They eat colonial cnidarians such as the Portuguese man o' war (a.k.a. bluebottle, or Physalia utriculus), blue buttons (Porpita porpita), and the by-the-wind sailor (Velella velella).

The nudibranch has been observed to exhibit aggregation patterns. This is in response to prey such as Por. Pacifica. This makes it so that it is easier for the nudibranch to outnumber and attack its prey.
