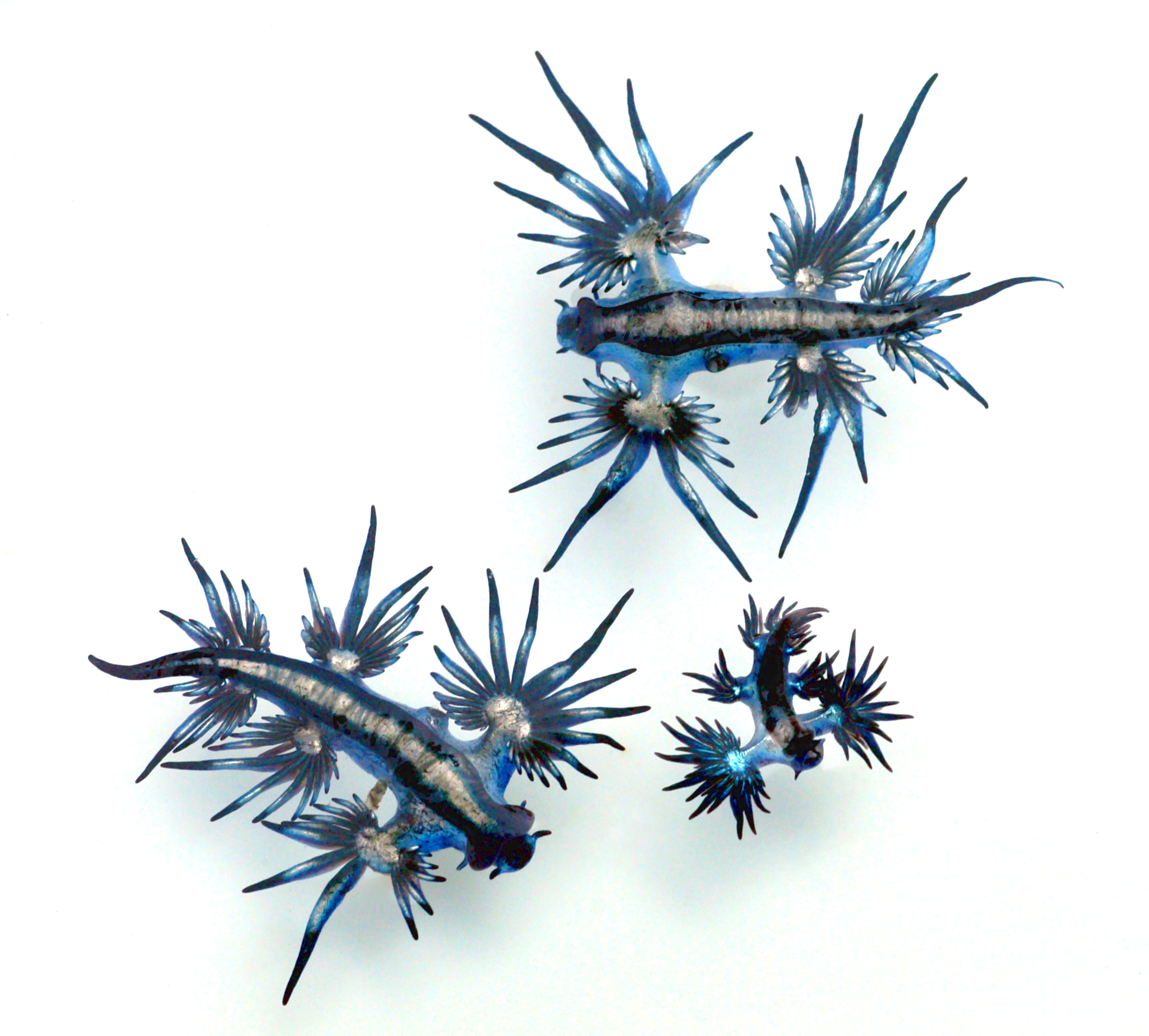
- Glaucus atlanticus and G. bennettae (bottom right)

Scientific classification
- Kingdom: Animalia
- Phylum: Mollusca
- Class: Gastropoda
- Order: Nudibranchia
- Suborder: Aeolidacea
- Superfamily: Aeolidioidea
- Family: Glaucidae; Gray, 1827
- Genus: Glaucus; Forster, 1777

Type species
- Glaucus atlanticus Forster, 1777

Species
- See text

Synonyms
- Dadone Gistel, 1848; Glaucilla Bergh, 1860

= Glaucus (gastropod) =

Genus of gastropods

Glaucus is a genus of small blue pelagic sea slugs. They are aeolid nudibranchs, ranging in size from 20 to 40 mm (0.79 to 1.57 in). They feed on colonial cnidarians such as Portuguese men o' war, blue buttons, and purple sails. They can produce painful and potentially dangerous stings when handled, as they store the venomous nematocysts of their prey. Glaucus is the only genus in the family Glaucidae. It includes five species.

== Taxonomic history ==
The genus Glaucus was established by monotypy in 1777 by the British naturalist Johann Reinhold Forster. He described specimens of Glaucus atlanticus recovered during the second voyage of James Cook aboard HMS Resolution. The genus is named after the Greek sea-god Glaucus. In 1848, the German naturalist Johannes Gistel provided the substitute name Dadone for Glaucus. But it is unnecessary and is now regarded as invalid.

The family Glaucidae was established in 1827 by the British zoologist John Edward Gray to contain the genus. A second species in the family was described by the Danish malacologist Rudolph Bergh in 1860. He placed it under a new genus Glaucilla. However, the synapomorphies between Glaucus and Glaucilla have made the maintenance of both genera irrelevant. Therefore Glaucus is now regarded as the only genus within the family Glaucidae. Glaucidae is classified under the superfamily Aeolidioidea.

In 2014, a careful DNA and anatomical study of the genus unexpectedly revealed the presence of a species complex. Only one species was found in the Atlantic, but the name Glaucus marginatus was revealed to include four separate species (referred to informally as the 'marginatus' clade). There are three species in the North Pacific Subtropical Gyre System and another species in the South Pacific Subtropical Gyre System. Glaucus atlanticus also occurs throughout the Indo-Pacific as well as in the Atlantic Ocean. In the North Pacific are Glaucus marginatus, Glaucus thompsoni and Glaucus mcfarlanei, with Glaucus marginatus also occurring in the Indian Ocean and the South Pacific. Also in the South Pacific is Glaucus bennettae.

Glaucus atlanticus has some genetic differences in different parts of its range but is considered to be a single species.

== Species ==
Species within the genus Glaucus include:

Species	Distribution	Image
Glaucus atlanticus Forster, 1777	Atlantic Ocean	
Glaucus bennettae Churchill, Valdés & Ó Foighil, 2014	South Pacific	
Glaucus mcfarlanei Churchill, Valdés & Ó Foighil, 2014	North Pacific	
Glaucus marginatus (Bergh, 1860)	Indo-Pacific	
Glaucus thompsoni Churchill, Valdés & Ó Foighil, 2014	North Pacific	

Species brought into synonymy

- Glaucus distichoicus d'Orbigny, 1837: synonym of Glaucus atlanticus Forster, 1777
- Glaucus flagellum Blumenblach, 1803: synonym of Glaucus atlanticus Forster, 1777
- Glaucus hexapterigius Cuvier, 1805: synonym of Glaucus atlanticus Forster, 1777
- Glaucus lineatus Reinhardt & Bergh, 1864: synonym of Glaucus atlanticus Forster, 1777
- Glaucus longicirrhus Reinhardt & Bergh, 1864: synonym of Glaucus atlanticus Forster, 1777
