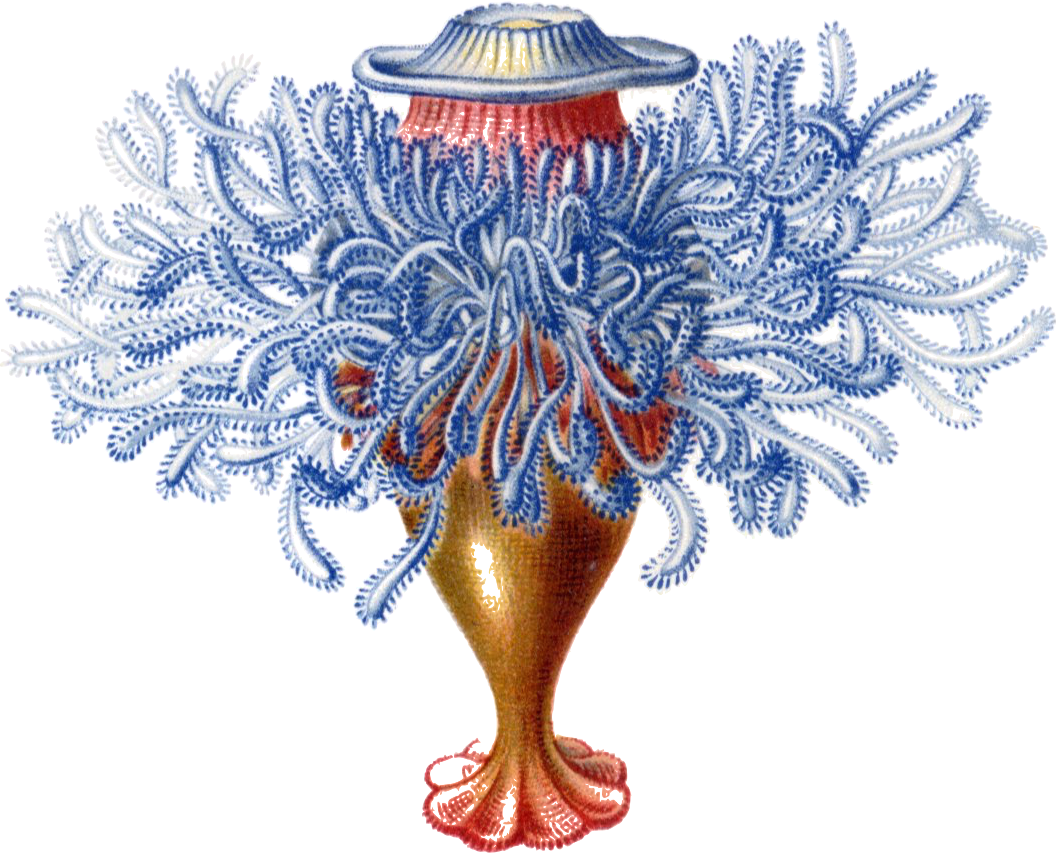
- Porpita prunella, from Haeckel's Kunstformen der Natur

Scientific classification
- Domain: Eukaryota
- Kingdom: Animalia
- Phylum: Cnidaria
- Class: Hydrozoa
- Order: Anthoathecata
- Family: Porpitidae
- Genus: Porpita
- Species: P. prunella

Binomial name
- Porpita prunella (Haeckel, 1888)

Synonyms
- Porpalia prunella Haeckel, 1888; Porpema prunella (Haeckel, 1888); Discalia medusina Haeckel, 1888

= Porpita prunella =

Species of hydrozoan

Porpita prunella is a marine species of hydrozoan organisms within the family Porpitidae. It consists of colonies of zooids. Very little is known about this species, as there have been no confirmed sightings since its discovery in 1801 and naming by Haeckel in 1888. Being in the chondrophore group, it is likely that its behaviour is similar to the other species of the genera in the family. However there are also serious doubts as to its very existence as a separate species and may in fact be a synonym for Porpita porpita instead.

== Description and characteristics ==
The sole reported observation of a member of the species was by Haeckel in 1888. He had mistakenly placed several illustrations of the species from different views and stages of its life cycle on siphonophorae, as the chondrophores were originally placed along with the Siphonophores. However simple conclusions about the species can be made from these illustrations and the relationship between the other members of Porpitidae, as all of the chondrophores have features common to all species.

All chondrophores possess small tentacles that are known to cause minor irritation to human skin. They live at the surface of the open ocean, and are colonies of carnivorous, free-floating hydroids whose role in the plankton community is similar to that of pelagic jellyfish. The structures that cause their buoyancy – floats – are gas-filled membranes in other chondrophores. The floats are not obvious in this species from Haeckel's description, and have not been formally described, although the strange hat-like structure on the hydrozoan's aboral side may have this function. The hydroid colony itself closely resembles the tentacles of a scyphozoan; however, each tentacle structure is an individual zooid, which may consist of a medusa or a polyp. Each strand consists of numerous branchlets, which all end in stinging nematocysts.

The species is considered to be neustonic, passively drifting on the surface of the sea. A single mouth is located on its underside, and it appears to be re-orientable and movable. The mouth is used for both the intake of prey and the expulsion of wastes.
