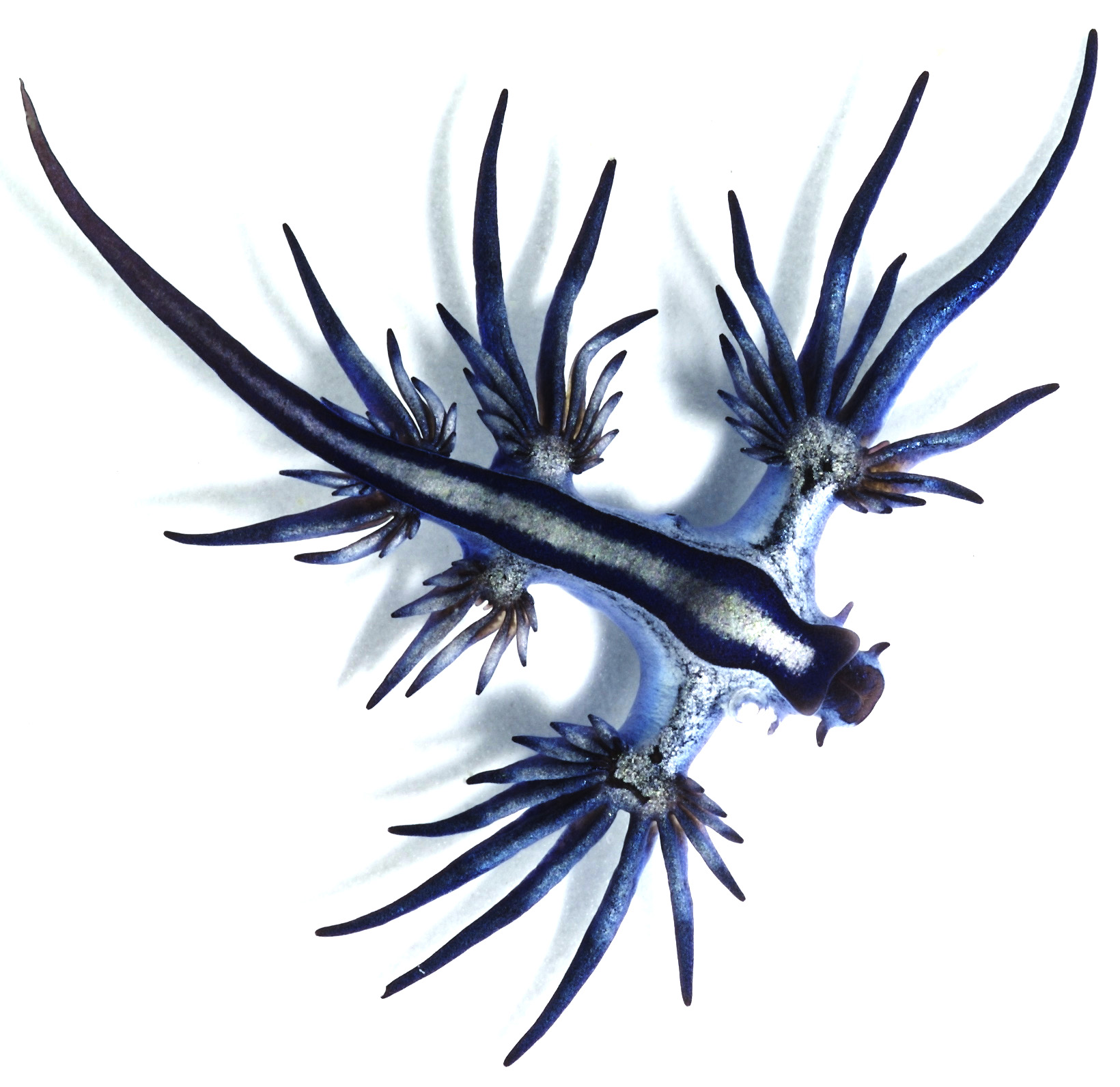

Scientific classification
- Kingdom: Animalia
- Phylum: Mollusca
- Class: Gastropoda
- Order: Nudibranchia
- Suborder: Aeolidacea
- Family: Glaucidae
- Genus: Glaucus
- Species: G. atlanticus

Binomial name
- Glaucus atlanticus Forster, 1777

Synonyms
- Doris radiata Gmelin, 1791 (synonym); Glaucus distichoicus d'Orbigny, 1837; Glaucus flagellum Blumenblach, 1803 (synonym); Glaucus hexapterigius Cuvier, 1805 (synonym); Glaucus lineatus Reinhardt & Bergh, 1864; Glaucus longicirrhus Reinhardt & Bergh, 1864

= Glaucus atlanticus =

Species of mollusc

Glaucus atlanticus (common names include the blue sea dragon, sea swallow, blue angel, blue glaucus, dragon slug, blue dragon, blue sea slug, and blue ocean slug) is a species of sea slug in the family Glaucidae.

These sea slugs live in the pelagic zone (open ocean), where they float upside-down by using the surface tension of the water to stay afloat. In addition, they have a gas bubble in their stomach that makes it easier for them to float. They are carried along by the winds and ocean currents. G. atlanticus makes use of countershading; the blue side of their bodies faces upwards, blending in with the blue of the water. The silver-grey dorsal side of the sea slug faces downwards, blending in with the sunlight shining through the ocean's surface when viewed from below the surface of the water.

G. atlanticus feeds on other pelagic creatures, including the Portuguese man o' war and other venomous siphonophores. This sea slug stores stinging nematocysts from the siphonophores within its own tissues as defence against predators. Humans handling the slug may receive a very painful and potentially dangerous sting.

== Etymology ==
The generic name Glaucus is derived from the Ancient Greek glaukós, meaning “bluish-grey”, “bluish-green” or “gleaming”.

== Taxonomy ==
This species looks similar to, and is closely related to, G. marginatus, which is now understood to be not one species, but a cryptic species complex of four separate species that live in the Indian and Pacific Oceans. It shares the common name "blue dragon" with Pteraeolidia ianthina and G. marginatus.

== Description ==
At maturity, G. atlanticus is usually around 3 cm (1.2 in) long, although larger specimens have been found. It can live for up to a year under the right conditions. It is silvery grey on its dorsal side and dark and pale blue ventrally. It has dark blue stripes on its head. It has a flat, tapering body and six appendages that branch out into rayed, finger-like cerata.

The first pair of cerata, also known as papillae, extends laterally from peduncles with a short stalk, while the other two groups are sessile. The most dorsal cerata in a group is largest and other cerata decreases in size ventrally. The anterior corners of the foot (the dorsal side) are rounded. The centre of the foot is silver in colour, and the outer edge varies from dark blue to brown. The papillae are placed in a single row (uniseriate) and may number up to 84 in total (unlike over one another as in G. marginatus).

G. atlanticus is usually found in tropical/subtropical areas, floating at the ocean's surface due to the stored gulped air inside its stomach. It usually feeds on cnidarians, and emits squeaking sounds while it feeds, possibly due to air escaping its stomach in the process.

The radula of this species bears serrated teeth, which paired with a strong jaw and denticles, allows it to grasp and "chip down" parts of its prey.

== Buoyancy and colouration ==
With the aid of a gas-filled sac in its stomach, G. atlanticus floats at the surface. Due to the location of the gas sac, this species floats upside down. The upper surface is actually the foot (the underside in other slugs and snails), and this has either a blue or blue-white coloration. The true dorsal surface (carried downwards in G. atlanticus) is completely silver-grey. This coloration is an example of countershading, which helps protect it from predators that might attack from below and from above. The blue coloration is also thought to reflect harmful ultraviolet sunlight.

== Distribution and habitat ==
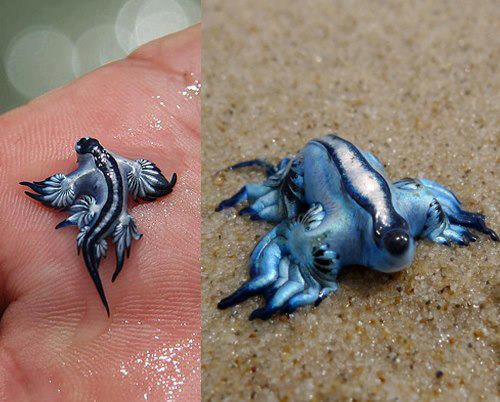
Glaucus atlanticus is the blue sea slug shown here out of water on a beach, and thus collapsed; however, touching the animal directly with one's skin can result in a painful sting, with symptoms similar to those caused by the Portuguese man o' war.

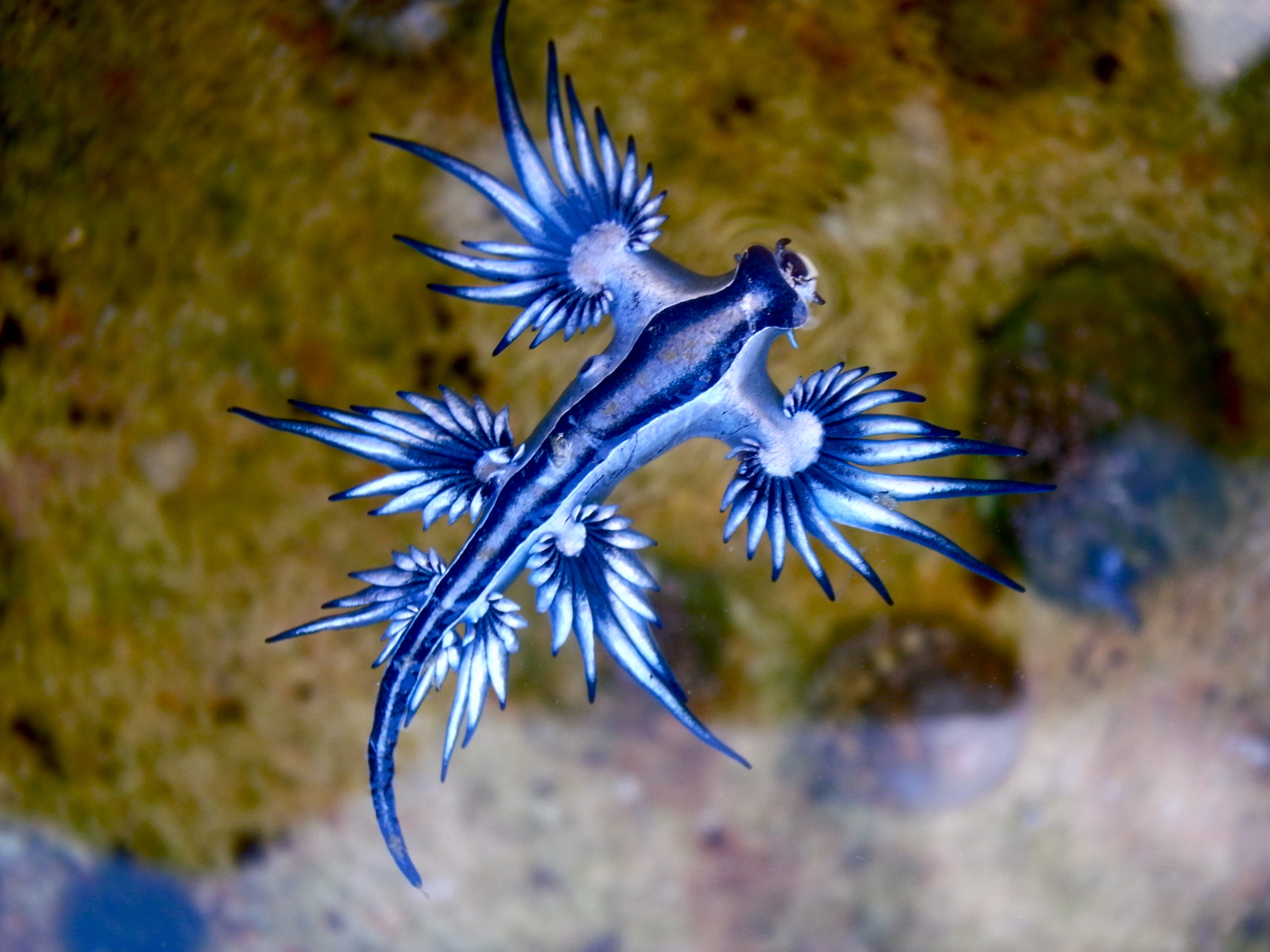
The slug in the water

=== Habitat ===
This nudibranch is pelagic, and some evidence indicates that it occurs throughout the world's oceans, in temperate and tropical waters. Although these sea slugs live on the open ocean, they sometimes accidentally wash up onto the shore, so they may be found on beaches. Along the Brazilian Coast, the distribution of G. atlanticus is shaped by the Brazil Current and seasonal shifts in the Subtropical Convergence Zone, specifically during El Niño events. These ocean currents and shifts in the weather can push the species toward the shore, ultimately causing seasonal strandings.

=== Distribution ===
It has been recorded from the east and south coasts of South Africa, European waters, the east coast of Australia, and Mozambique. With recent sightings in Central America and South Asia.

Since the middle of the 19th century, records of this species have been reported on the Azores.

G. atlanticus was recently found in the Humboldt Current ecosystem in Peru in 2013, and off Andhra Pradesh in India in 2012. This is in line with the known habitat characteristics of the species; they thrive in warm, temperate climates in the Southern Pacific, and in circumtropical and Lusitanian environments. Before finding G. atlanticus off Andhra Pradesh, these nudibranchs were documented as having been seen in the Bay of Bengal and off the coast of Tamil Nadu, India, over 677 km (421 mi) apart.

Observations in 2015 and 2016 suggested that the G. atlanticus species' geographical range had increased northward by 150 km (93 mi) in the Gulf of California in Central America compared with previous sightings. G. atlanticus was also found off Bermuda in January 2016, and uncommonly washes ashore on east coast beaches at Barbados, Lesser Antilles.

In April 2022, specimens were found in the Gulf of Mexico along the Texas coast, US. On 31 August 2023 and 11 July 2025, blue sea slugs were reported to be found along Karon Beach, Phuket, Thailand.

On 31 July and 12 August 2025, specimens were spotted on the beaches of Lanzarote. On 20 and 21 August 2025, specimens were also spotted on two beaches in Alicante, Spain; on the beach of Guardamar del Segura, which resulted in the closure of the beach for several hours, as well as on the beach of La Mata, in Torrevieja.

== Life history and behaviour ==
G. atlanticus preys on other larger pelagic organisms. The sea slugs can move toward prey or mates by using their cerata, the thin feather-like "fingers" on its body, to make slow swimming movements. They are known to prey on the dangerously venomous Portuguese man o' war (Physalia physalis), the by-the-wind-sailor (Velella velella), the blue button (Porpita porpita), and the violet snail, Janthina janthina. Occasionally, individuals attack and eat other individuals in captivity.

The species is able to feed on the Portuguese man o' war due to its immunity to the venomous nematocysts. The slug consumes chunks of the organism and appears to select and store the most venomous nematocysts for its own use against future prey in a process called kleptocnidy. The nematocysts are collected in specialised sacs (cnidosacs) at the tip of the animal's cerata. Because G. atlanticus concentrates the venom, it can produce a more powerful and deadly sting than the man o' war on which it feeds.

Like almost all heterobranchs, blue dragons are hermaphrodites and their male reproductive organs have evolved to be especially large and hooked to avoid their partner's venomous cerata. Unlike most nudibranchs, which mate with their right sides facing, sea swallows mate with ventral sides facing. After mating, both individuals are able to lay eggs and can release up to 20 on an egg string, often laying them in wood pieces or carcasses. On average, G. atlanticus can lay 55 egg strings per hour. G. atlanticus is not globally panmictic, but is localized within ocean basins. Gene flow among Afro-Eurasian and American populations is thus hindered by physical obstructions and water temperatures in the Arctic and Southern Oceans.

== Sting ==
G. atlanticus can swallow the venomous nematocysts from siphonophores, such as the Portuguese man o' war, and store them in the extremities of its finger-like cerata in a process called kleptocnidy. Picking up the animal can result in a painful sting, with symptoms similar to those caused by the Portuguese man o' war. The symptoms that may appear after being stung are nausea, pain, vomiting, acute allergic contact dermatitis, erythema, urticarial papules, potential vesicle formation, and postinflammatory hyperpigmentation.

== See also ==
- Ocean surface ecosystem
