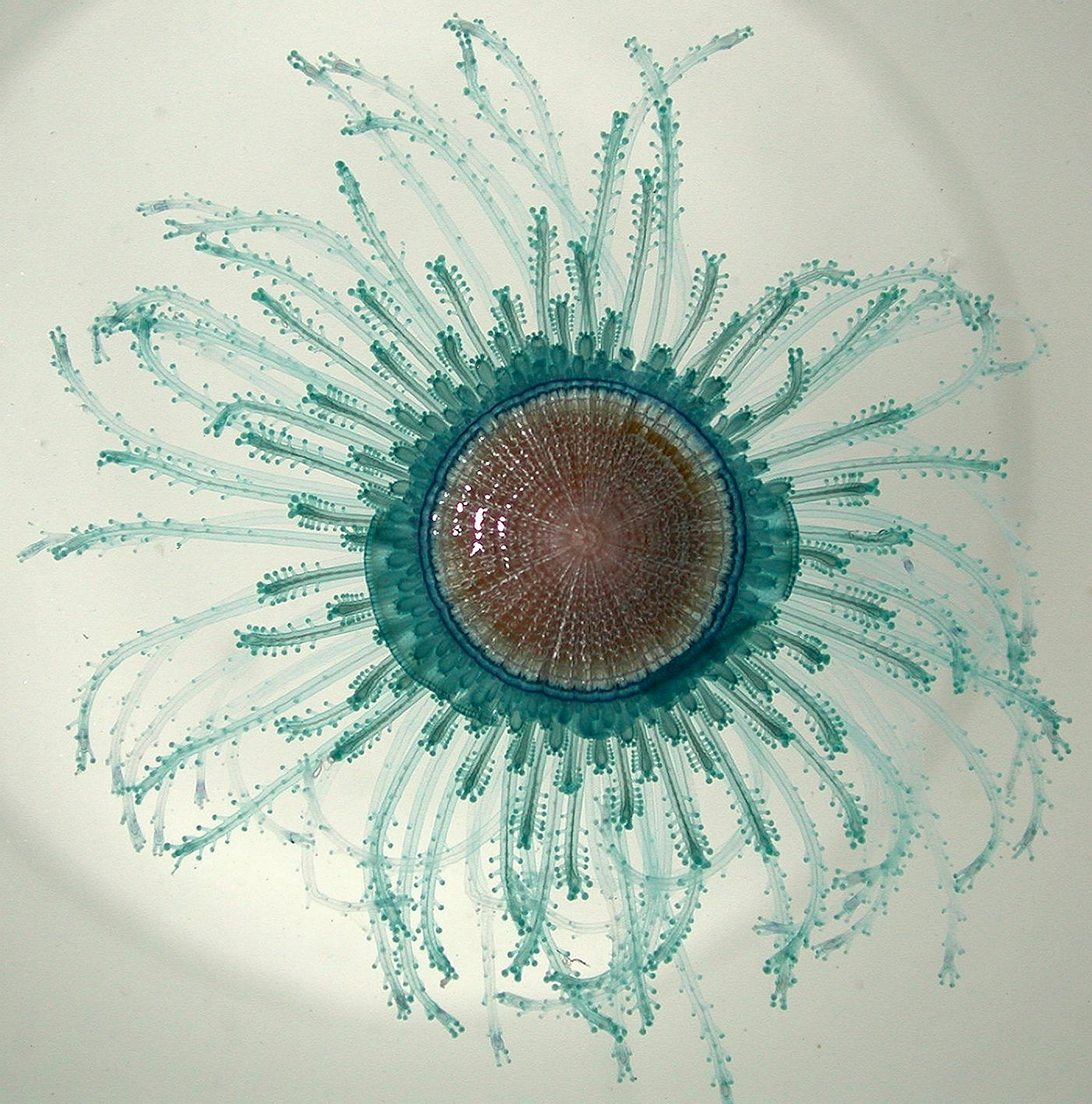
- Blue button (Porpita porpita)

Scientific classification
- Kingdom: Animalia
- Phylum: Cnidaria
- Class: Hydrozoa
- Order: Anthoathecata
- Family: Porpitidae
- Genus: Porpita; Lamarck, 1801

Species
- Porpita porpita; Porpita prunella

Synonyms
- List: Polybrachionia Guilding, 1828; Acies Lesson, 1830; Ratis Lesson, 1830; Chrysomitra Gegenbaur, 1857; Discalia Haeckel, 1888; Discomitra Haeckel, 1888; Disconalia Haeckel, 1888; Porpalia Haeckel, 1888; Porpema Haeckel, 1888; Porpitella Haeckel, 1888

= Porpita =

Genus of hydrozoans

Porpita is a genus of hydrozoans in the family Porpitidae. It has two species recognized and is the type genus of its family.

Porpita is in the phylum Cnidaria. Similar to the well-known Portuguese Man-of-War, species in this genus consist mainly of colonies of hydrozoans, linked to a biological float, keeping them near the surface. Unlike the Man-of-War, however, the porpita lacks a sail and therefore does not get blown ashore as often.

Organisms from this genus reside in tropical to sub-tropical waters all around the world. Like other cnidarians, they possess stinging cells called cnidoblasts. The most common species of this genus is the Porpita porpita, more commonly known as the "Blue Button Jellyfish." Often washing up on the coast of Florida, these particular hydrozoans do not possess a significant sting. Beachgoers that have come across them often say the sting is very minimal, if noticeable at all.
