= Peronia indica =

Scientific classification
- Kingdom: Animalia
- Phylum: Mollusca
- Class: Gastropoda
- Order: Systellommatophora
- Family: Onchidiidae
- Genus: Peronia
- Species: P. indica

Binomial name
- Peronia indica (Labbé, 1934)

Synonyms
- Quoyella indica (Labbé, 1934)

Species of gastropod

Peronia indica is a species of air-breathing sea slug, a shell-less marine pulmonate gastropod mollusk in the family Onchidiidae.
