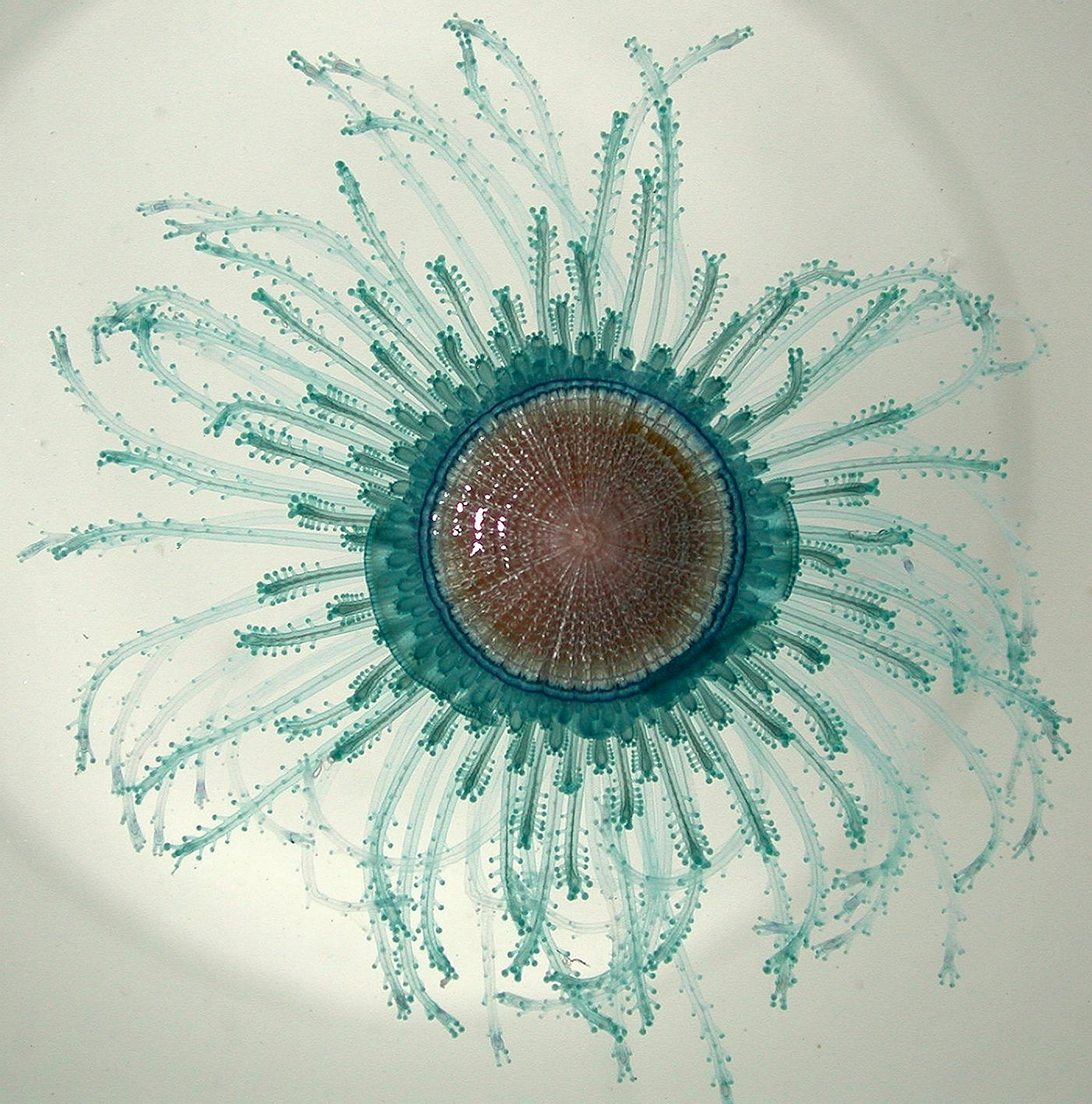
- Blue button (Porpita porpita)

Scientific classification
- Kingdom: Animalia
- Phylum: Cnidaria
- Class: Hydrozoa
- Order: Anthoathecata
- Suborder: Capitata
- Family: Porpitidae; Goldfuss, 1818

Type genus
- Porpita

Genera and species
- Porpita; Porpita porpita; Porpita prunella?; Velella; Velella velella

Synonyms
- Velellidae Eschscholtz, 1829; Discalidae Haeckel, 1888; Porpalidae Haeckel, 1888; Porpitellidae Haeckel, 1888; Disconectae Haeckel, 1888; Chondrophora Totton, 1954

= Chondrophore =

Chondrophores

Small group of hydrozoans comprising the family Porpitidae

The chondrophores or porpitids are a small group of hydrozoans in the family Porpitidae. Though it derives from an outdated name for this lineage, some find the term chondrophore still useful as a synonym for members of the family Porpitidae – porpitids – when discussing the two genera contained in Porpita and Velella, to avoid confusion with the near-identical name of the former.

They all live at the surface of the open ocean, and are colonies of carnivorous, free-floating hydroids. The chondrophores look like a single organism, but are actually colonial animals, made up of orderly cooperatives of polyps living under specialized sail-structures. The colony's role in the plankton community is similar to that of pelagic jellyfish.

The most familiar members of the family Porpitidae are the blue button (Porpita porpita) and the by-the-wind sailor (Velella velella).

== Description ==
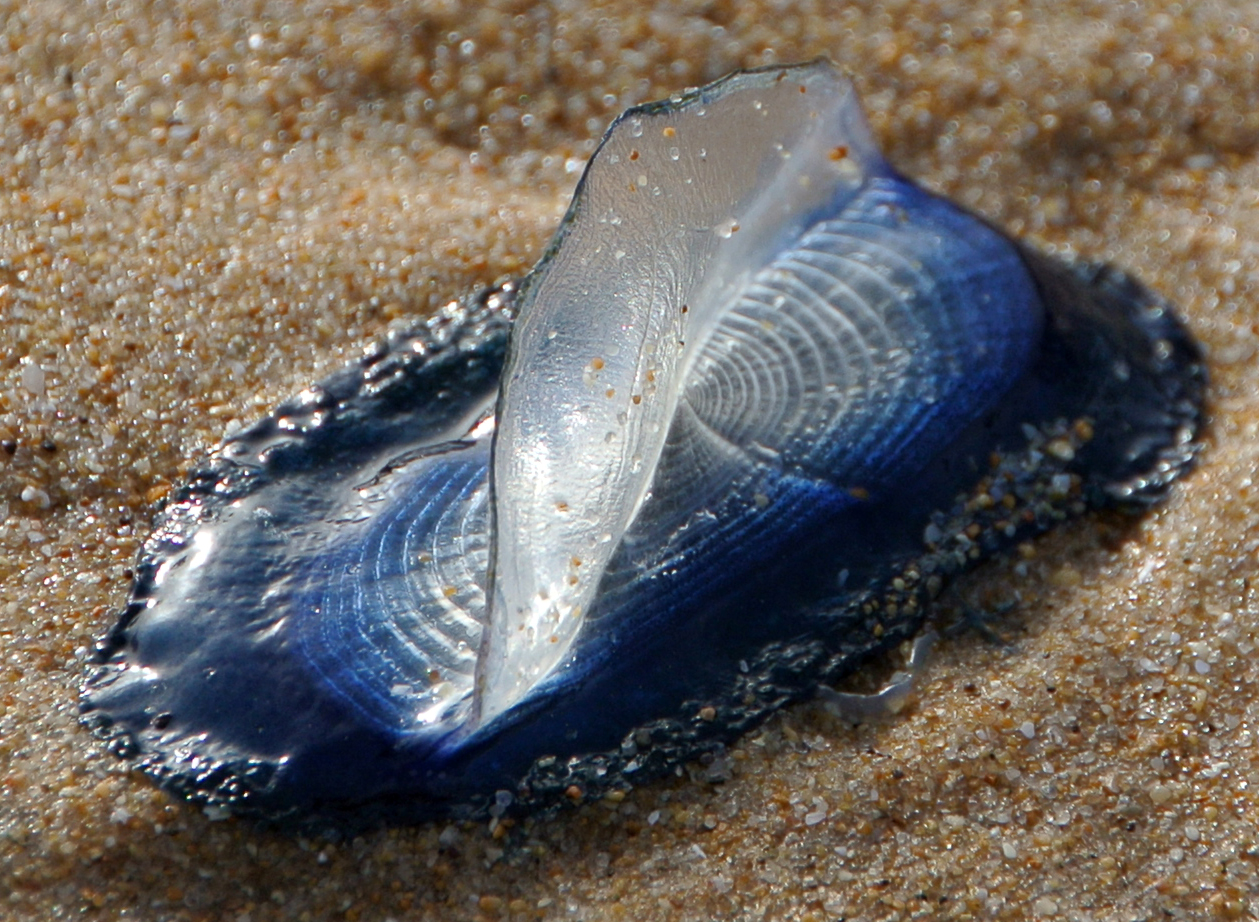
Velella velella on the southern coast of Sicily

The tiny individual animals are specialized to perform specific tasks for the benefit of their colony: Some form the central gas-filled golden brown disc (which is hardened by chitinous material) essential to keeping the colony afloat; others gather as radiating tentacles that perform tasks such as catching prey, reproduction, and digestion. Chondrophores' principal prey are microplankton, which they capture using the stinging cells in individual polyps' tentacles. Although none have powerful stings, contact with the skin may cause irritation.

Chondrophores reproduce by releasing tiny (0.3–2.5 millimetres or 1/64–3/32 inch) medusae, which go on to develop new clonal colonies. Chondrophores are pelagic and drift in the open ocean, often in large aggregations of different colonies. They are at the mercy of winds and currents; mass beachings are annual events on the west coast of North America.

Velella differs from Porpita by their transparent, membranous sail-shaped floats; filled with gas, the membranes have a texture reminiscent of cellophane. Both genera have turquoise to dark blue mantles and tentacles, with lemon-yellow morphs occasionally encountered. Neither group is particularly large: the floats of Velella are usually under 7.6 centimetres (3 inches) in diameter, while those of Porpita are usually less than 3.8 centimetres (1.5 inches).

== Systematics ==
The order Chondrophora was created by A.K. Totton in 1954 to accommodate these unusual genera of hydrozoans as their taxonomic affinities were unclear. They had previously been placed either in the Anthoathecata or the Siphonophorae, as order Disconectae, and though many accepted Totton's placement, a considerable number of authors maintained them in the Anthoathecata at the time.

By the 1970s / 1980s, nearly all hydrozoan systematists were in agreement that these genera did indeed belong in that group and the order Chondrophora became defunct, replaced by the family Porpitidae, which took priority over the more recent name Velellidae (the group was subdivided into these two families, when still ranked as an order). In modern classifications, the Porpitidae are included in the hydrozoan suborder Capitata.

They are believed to have originated anciently, in the late Proterozoic period, some 650–540 million years ago. A rare soft-bodied fossil that was recovered from the Farmers Member of the Borden Formation (Mississippian age) in northeastern Kentucky was interpreted as a chondrophorine float and potential porpitids were described from the Carrara Formation (lower Cambrian) of California.
