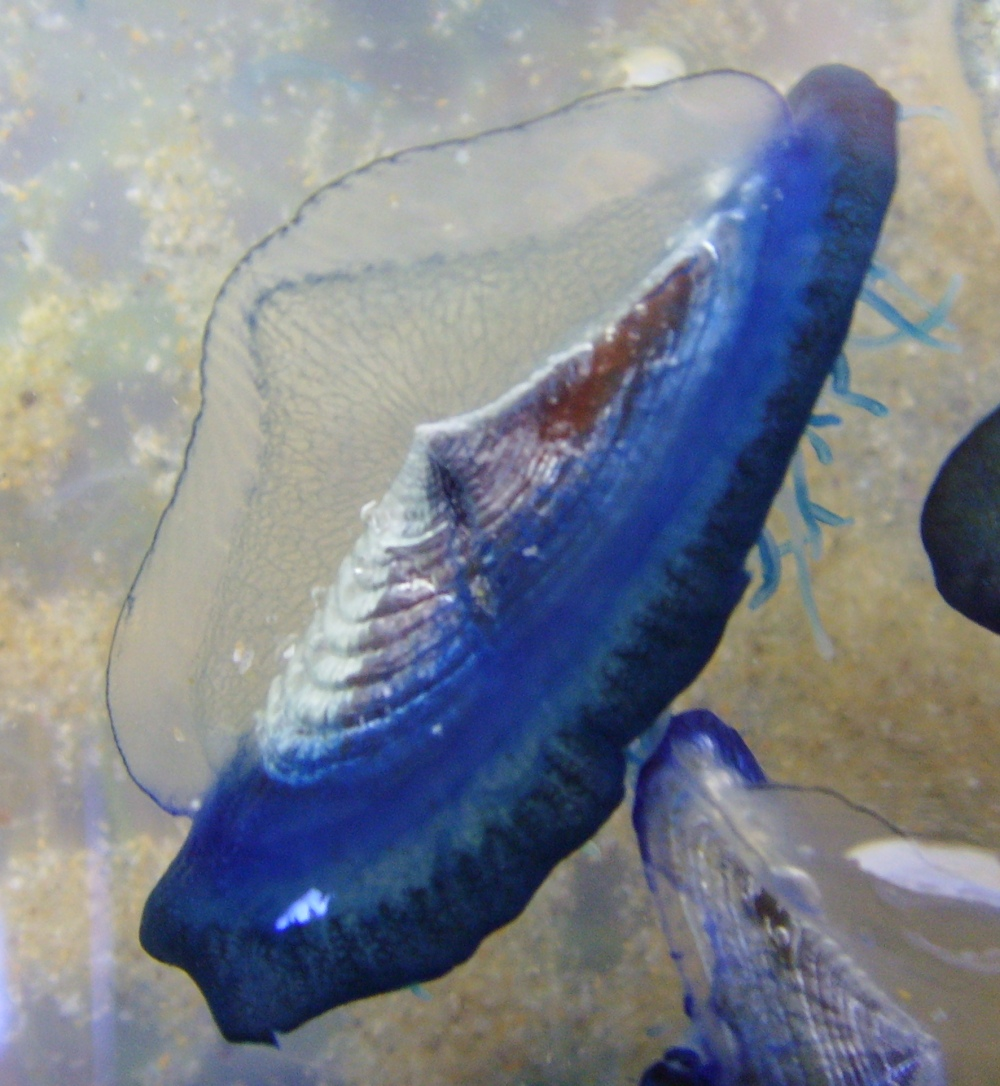
- Close-up of a V. velella colony

Scientific classification
- Kingdom: Animalia
- Phylum: Cnidaria
- Class: Hydrozoa
- Order: Anthoathecata
- Family: Porpitidae
- Genus: Velella; Lamarck, 1801
- Species: V. velella

Binomial name
- Velella velella (Linnaeus, 1758)

Synonyms
- List (Genus): Armenista Haeckel, 1888; Rataria Eschscholtz, 1829; Velaria Haeckel, 1888; (Species): Armenista sigmoides Haeckel, 1888; Holothuria spirans Forsskål, 1775; Medusa pocillum Montagu, 1815; Medusa velella Linnaeus, 1758; Rataria cordata Eschscholtz, 1829; Rataria mitrata Eschscholtz, 1829; Velella antarctica Eschscholtz, 1829; Velella aurora Eschscholtz, 1829; Velella australis de Haan, 1827; Velella caurina Eschscholtz, 1829; Velella cyanea Lesson, 1826; Velella emarginata Quoy & Gaimard, 1824; Velella indica Eschscholtz, 1829; Velella lata Chamisso & Eysenhardt, 1821; Velella limbosa Lamarck, 1816; Velella meridionalis Fewkes, 1889; Velella mutica Lamarck, 1801; Velella oblonga Chamisso & Eysenhardt, 1821; Velella oxyothone Brandt, 1835; Velella pacifica de Haan, 1827; Velella patellaris Brandt, 1835; Velella pyramidalis Cranch, 1818; Velella radackiana de Haan, 1827; Velella sandwichiana de Haan, 1827; Velella scaphidia Peron & Lesueur, 1807; Velella septentrionalis Eschscholtz, 1829; Velella sinistra Chamisso & Eysenhardt, 1821; Velella tentaculata Lamarck, 1801; Velella tropica Eschscholtz, 1829

= Velella =

Species of cnidarian

Velella is a genus of hydrozoa (a group of small, predatory marine cnidarians) in the family Porpitidae. Its only known species is Velella velella, a widely-distributed free-floating colonial animal that lives on the surface of the open ocean. It is commonly known by the names sea raft, by-the-wind sailor, purple sail, little sail, or simply Velella.

It is a member of a specialised ocean surface community that includes the better-known Portuguese man o' war. Specialized predatory molluscs prey on these cnidarians. Such predators include nudibranchs (sea slugs) in the genus Glaucus and purple snails in the genus Janthina.

Each apparent individual is a hydroid colony, and most are less than about 7 cm (2.8 in) long. They are usually deep blue in colour, with a small stiff sail that catches the wind and propels them over the surface of the sea. Under certain wind conditions, they may be stranded by the thousands on beaches.

Like other cnidarians, V. velella are carnivorous. They catch their prey, generally plankton, by means of tentacles that hang down in the water and bear stinging nematocysts (also called cnidocysts). The toxins in their nematocysts are effective against their prey. While cnidarians all possess nematocysts, in some species the nematocysts and toxins therein are more powerful than other species. The nematocysts of V. velella are relatively benign to humans, although each person may respond differently to contact with the nematocyst toxin; irritation may occur to skin exposed to V. velella nematocysts.

== Distribution and habitat ==
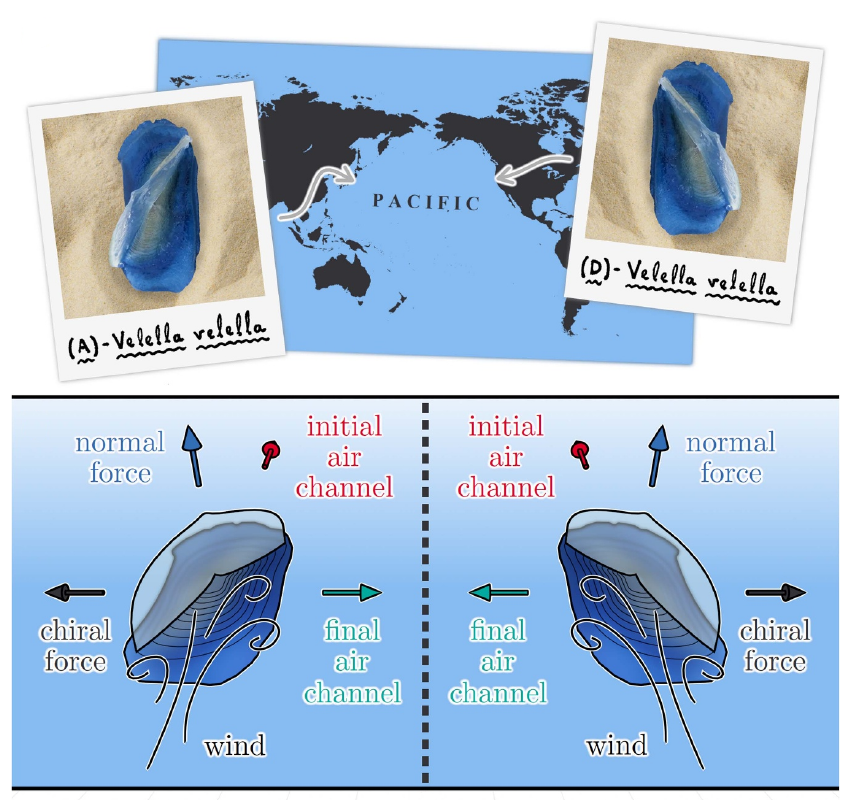
Chirality ('handedness') affects the direction of drift in V. velella

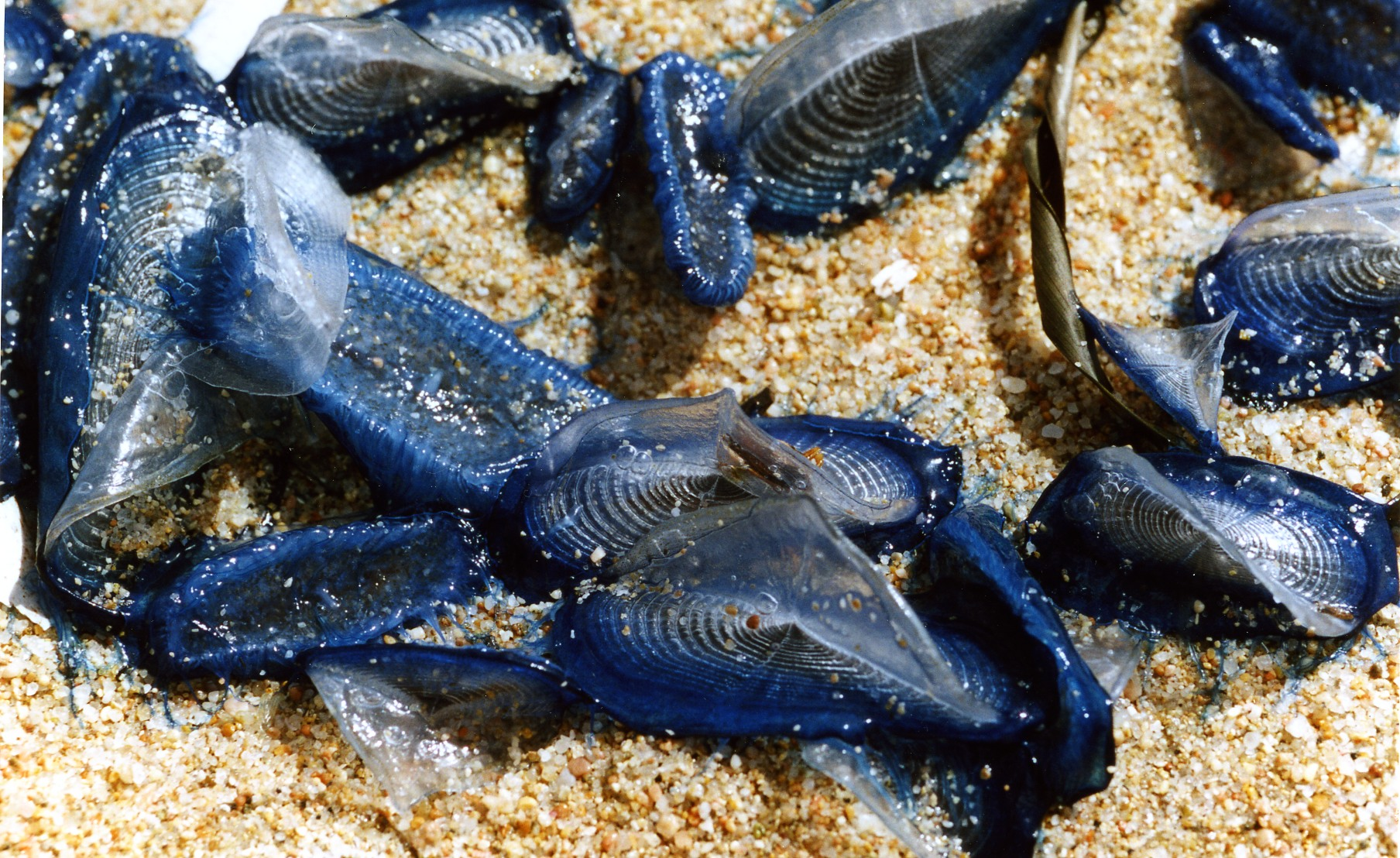
Stranded V. velella

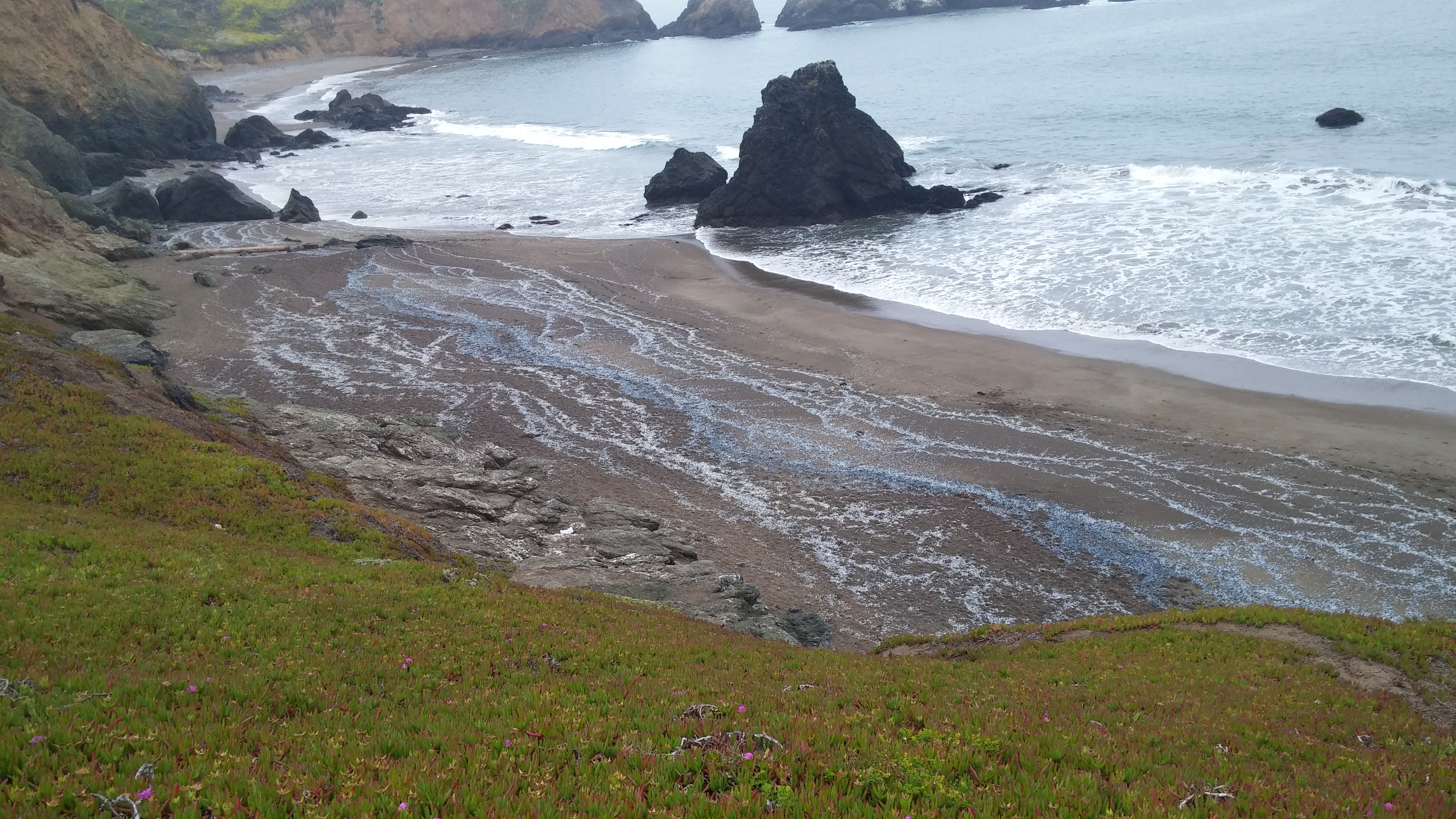
V. velella stranded on Rodeo Beach, Marin County, California.

V. velella lives in warm and temperate waters in all the world's oceans. They live at the water/air interface, with the float above the water, and polyps hanging down about a centimetre below. Organisms that live partly in and partly out of the water like this are known as neuston. Offshore boaters sometimes encounter thousands of V. velella on the water surface.

The small rigid sail projects into the air and catches the wind. However, V. velella sails always align along the direction of the wind where the sail may act as an aerofoil, so that the animals tend to sail downwind at a small angle to the wind. Having no means of locomotion other than its sail, V. velella is at the mercy of prevailing winds for moving around the seas, and are thereby also subject to mass-strandings on beaches throughout the world. For example, a mass stranding occurs most years in the spring along the West Coast of North America, from British Columbia to California, beginning in the north and moving south over several weeks' time. In some years, so many animals are left at the tide line by receding waves, that the line of dying (and subsequently rotting) animals may be many centimetres deep, along hundreds of kilometres of beaches. Mass strandings have been reported also on the west coast of Ireland, and in Hayle, on the west coast of Cornwall in England.

The individual colonies are asymmetrical, being either 'diagonal' or 'antidiagonal' (effectively, 'left-handed' or 'right-handed'; mirror images of each other). This chirality affects the direction of their dispersal; in the northern Pacific Ocean, 'diagonal' individuals tend to drift east to the west coast of North America, while 'antidiagonal' individuals tend to drift west to the coasts of eastern Asia, such as Japan.

== Life cycle ==
Like many Hydrozoa, V. velella has a bipartite life cycle, with a form of alternation of generations. The deep blue, by-the-wind sailors that are recognized by many beach-goers are the polyp phase of the life cycle. Each "individual" with its sail is really a hydroid colony connected by a canal system that enables the colony to share whatever food is ingested by individual polyps. Each by-the-wind sailor is a colony of all-male or all-female polyps. The colony has several different kinds of polyps, some of which are both feeding and reproductive, called gonozooids, and others protective, called dactylozooids.

The gonozooids each produce numerous tiny jellyfish by an asexual budding process, so that each V. velella colony produces thousands of tiny jellyfish (medusae), each about 1 mm (0.039 in) high and wide, over several weeks. The tiny medusae are each provided with many zooxanthellae, single-celled endosymbiotic organisms typically also found in corals and some sea anemones, that can utilize sunlight to provide energy to the jellyfish. Curiously, although a healthy captive V. velella will release many medusae under the microscope, and are expected to do the same in the sea, the medusae of V. velella are rarely captured in the plankton and very little is known about their natural history. The medusae develop to sexual maturity within about three weeks in the laboratory and their free-spawned eggs and sperm develop into a planktonic larva called a "conaria," which develops into a new floating V. velella hydroid colony.

== Systematics ==
The Porpitidae is a family of the Hydrozoa erected for two genera of hydroids that live floating free at the surface of the open ocean: Velella and Porpita. The systematic position of these peculiar genera has long been a topic of discussion among taxonomists who work with pelagic Cnidaria. The three genera were put in with athecate hydroids in the mid-to-late 19th century by some, whereas other authors at the time included them in the Siphonophorae. A new order was established for these genera by Totton, in 1954, called the Chondrophora, while at the same time, other authors favored again placing them in the Anthomedusae/Athecatae. Most authors in the past 40 years have accepted interpretation of these animals as unusual floating colonial athecate hydroids, which produce medusae clearly belonging in the Anthomedusae. Although the exact position of the family Porpitidae within the Athecatae/Anthomedusae is not yet clear, the order Chondrophora is no longer used by hydrozoan systematists.

== See also ==
- Porpita porpita
- Glaucus atlanticus
