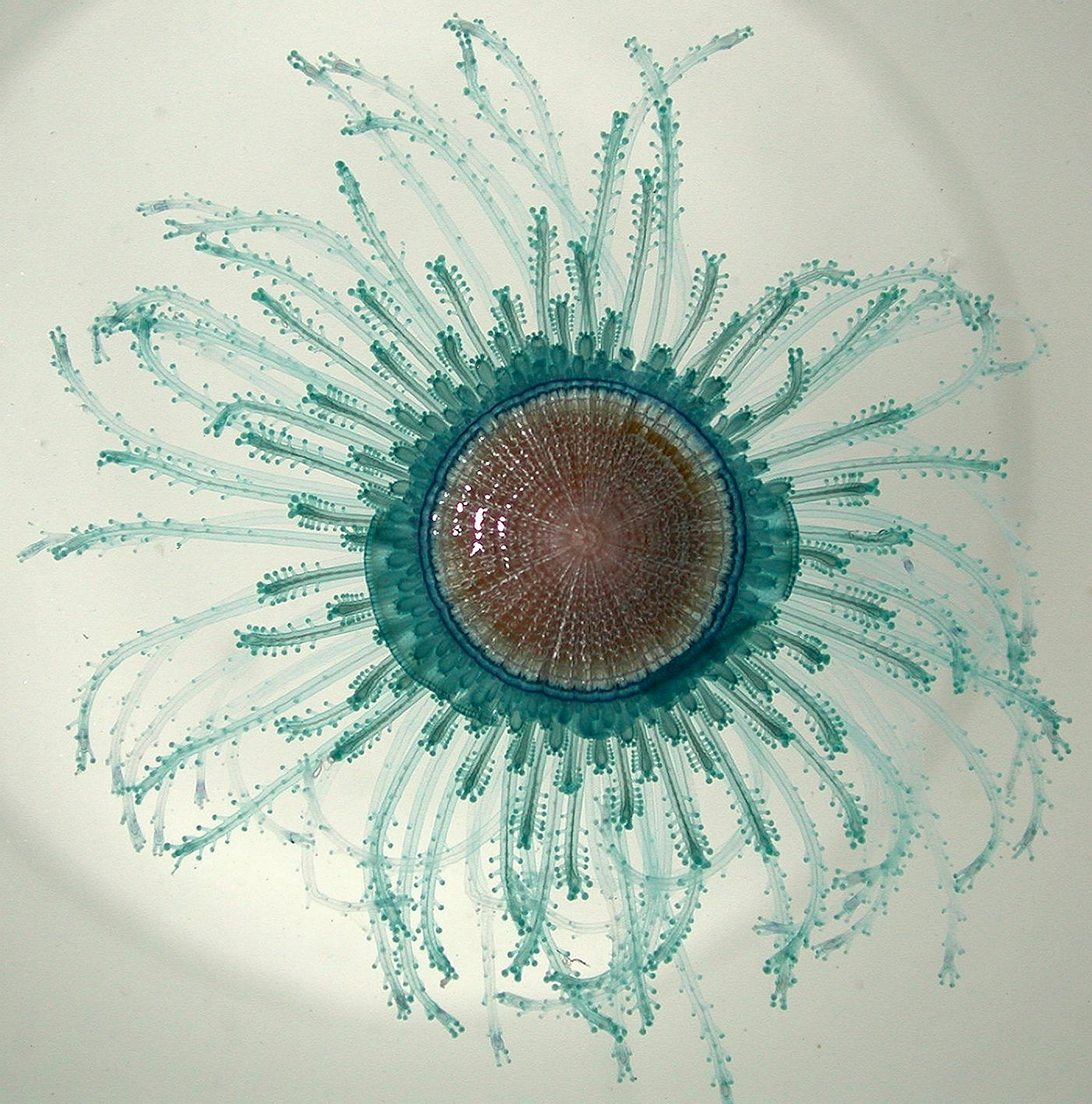
- Blue button

Scientific classification
- Kingdom: Animalia
- Phylum: Cnidaria
- Class: Hydrozoa
- Order: Anthoathecata
- Family: Porpitidae
- Genus: Porpita
- Species: P. porpita

Binomial name
- Porpita porpita (Linnaeus, 1758)

= Porpita porpita =

Species of hydrozoan

Porpita porpita, or the blue button, is a marine organism consisting of a colony of hydroids found in the warmer, tropical and sub-tropical waters of the Pacific, Atlantic, and Indian oceans, as well as the Mediterranean Sea and eastern Arabian Sea. It was first identified by Carl Linnaeus in 1758, under the basionym Medusa porpita. In addition, it is one of the two genera under the suborder Chondrophora, which is a group of cnidarians that also includes Velella. The chondrophores are similar to the better-known siphonophores, which includes the Portuguese man o' war, or Physalia physalis. Although it is superficially similar to a jellyfish, each apparent individual is actually a colony of hydrozoan polyps. The taxonomic class, Hydrozoa, falls under the phylum Cnidaria, which includes anemones, corals, and jellyfish, which explains their similar appearances.

== Description ==
Polyp movement

The blue button can grow up to 30 mm in diameter and lives on the surface of the sea and consists of two main parts: the float and the hydroid colony. The hard golden brown float is round, almost flat, and about one inch wide. The float organ is responsible for the organism's vertical movement and also contains pores that are able to communicate with other P. porpita organisms as well as its surroundings. The hydroid colony's polyps can range from bright blue turquoise to yellow. The polyps resemble the tentacles of jellyfish. Each strand has numerous branchlets, each of the knobs of stinging cells called nematocysts terminates at the distal end. The blue button has a single mouth located beneath the float, which is used for both the intake of prey and the expulsion of wastes. The mouth is surrounded by a ring of gonozooids and dactylozooids. Tentacles are found only on the dactylozooids, which exist furthest away from the mouth, towards the outer part of the hydroid colony.

== Habitat and feeding ==
The blue button is a part of the neustonic food web, which covers the organisms that inhabit the region on or near the surface of the ocean. This is because it is a passive drifter, which means that it relies on water currents and wind to carry it through the ocean. It is preyed on by the sea slug Glaucus atlanticus (sea swallow or blue dragon), violet sea-snails of the genus Janthina, and the other blue dragon, Glaucus marginatus. Unlike Velella, which prefers a passive diet, Porpita will hunt active crustaceans like crab and fish. It competes with other drifters for food, and mainly feeds on copepods and crustacean larvae.

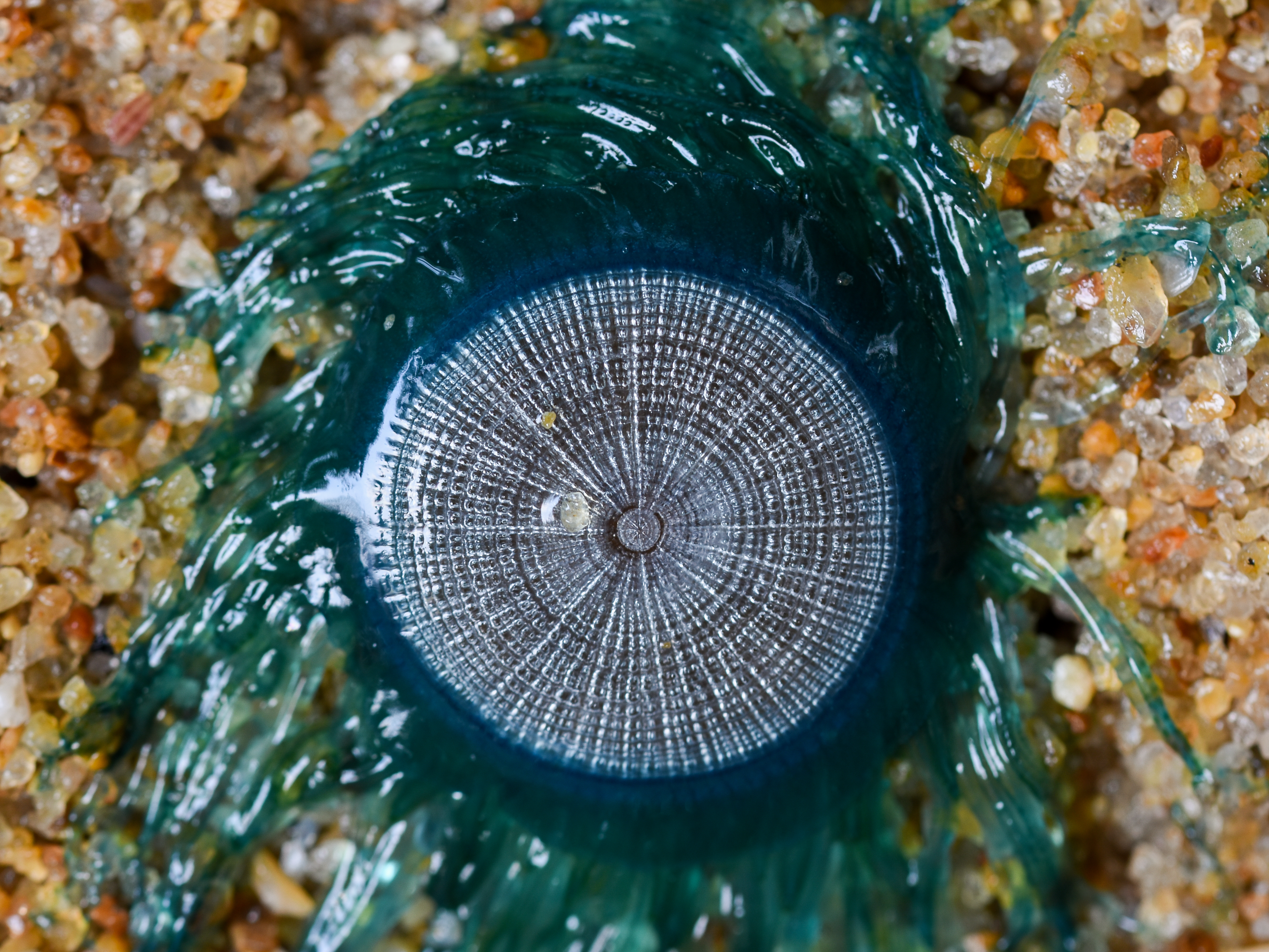
Central disk of blue button
1.5 cm diameter

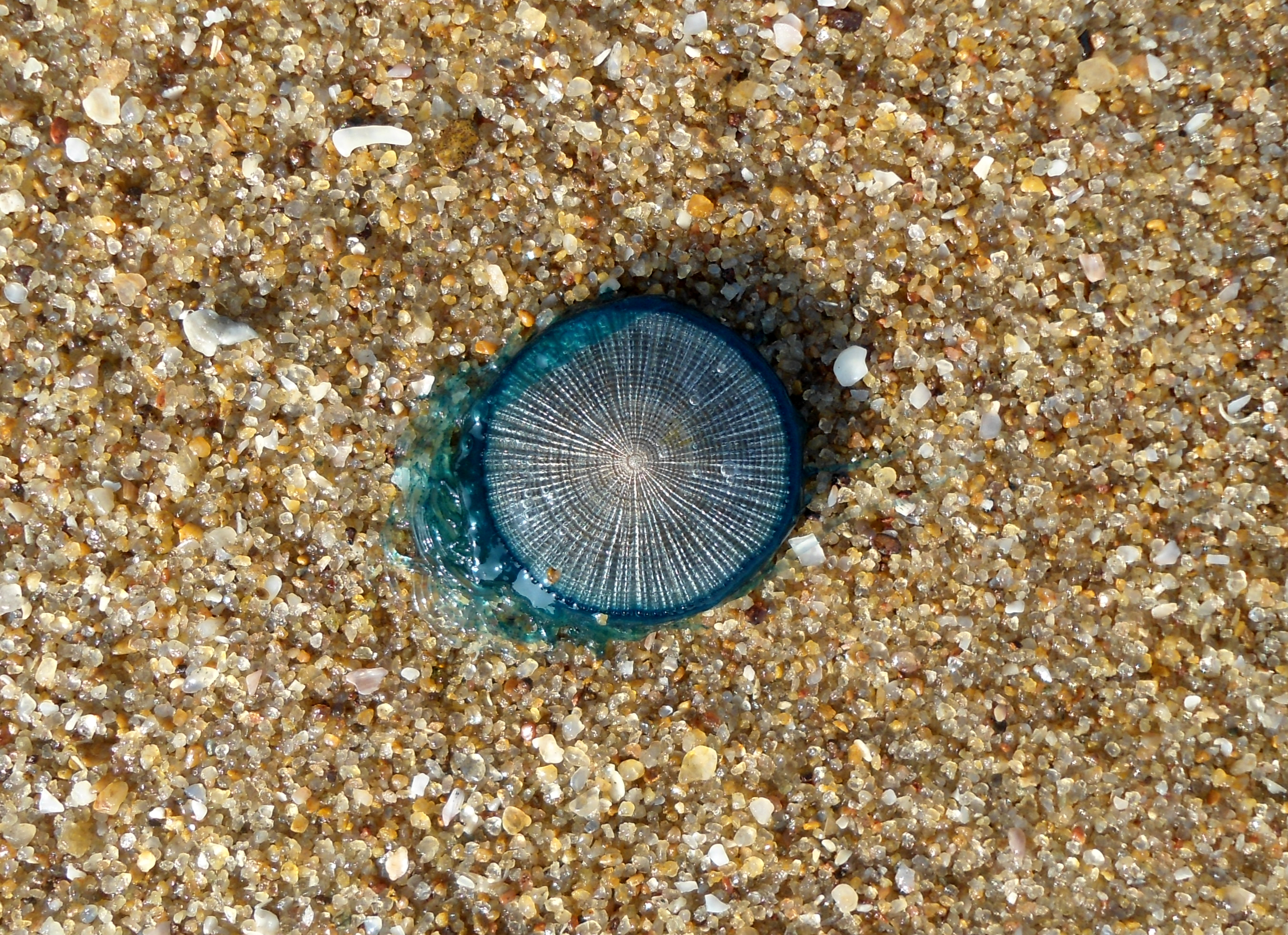
Blue button from Bay of Bengal

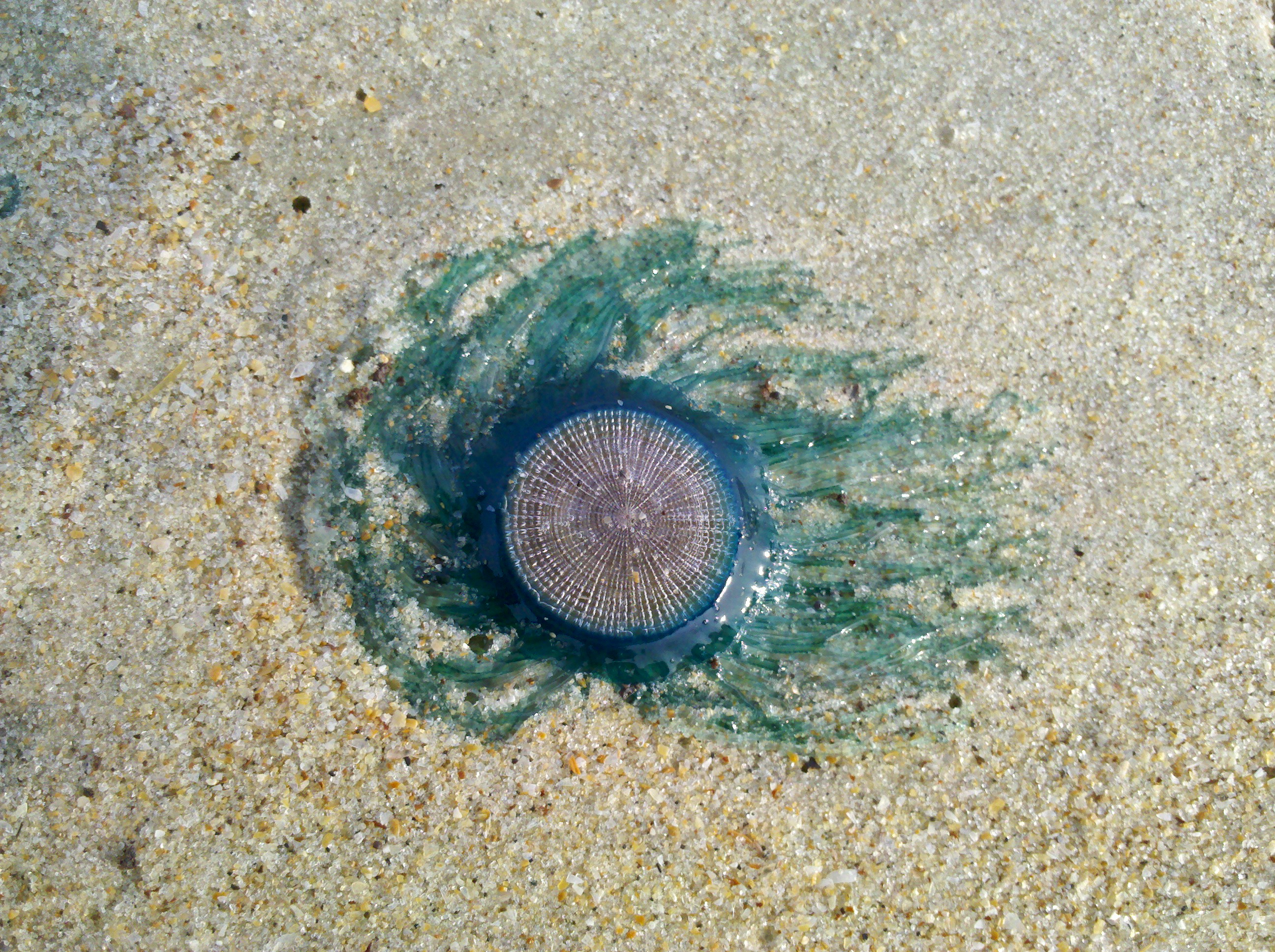
Blue button from Arabian Sea

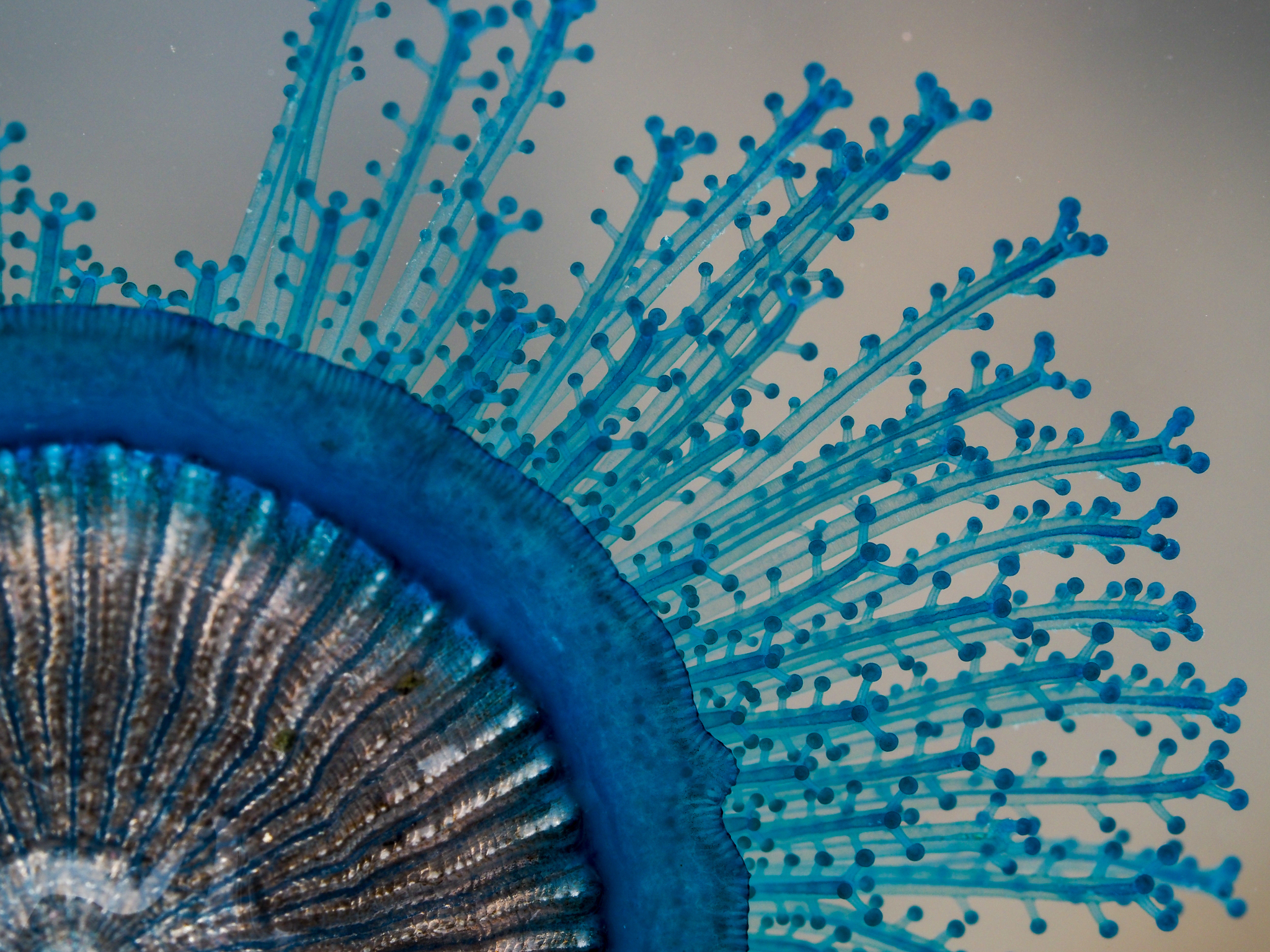
Polyp closeup

== Commensalism with a fish ==
Young Carangoides malabaricus, also known as the 'Malabar trevally', have been shown to take shelter underneath the floats of Porpita porpita. When removed from its host, the fish will panic. These juvenile fish also appear to show preference for a particular colony. When two pairs of Porpita porpita and Carangoides malabaricus are separated by species, then returned to the same tank, each fish will return to its respective partner.

== Effects of global warming ==
The blue button sting is not powerful but may cause slight irritation to human skin. However, in recent years, it has been hypothesized that, due to global warming, Porpita pacifica (another name for the species) colonies have begun appearing in larger numbers along coastlines in Japan, and the first case of contact dermatitis from this species was recorded. A sudden increase in the abundance of Porpita porpita has also been observed in a separate study of its populations in the Ionian and Adriatic seas, possibly also due to rising temperatures throughout the oceans.
