= Poly-γ-glutamate =

Names
- Other names Poly-γ-glutamate; γ-PGA; Poly-gamma-glutamic acid

Identifiers
CAS Number	49717-32-0
ChEBI	CHEBI:8296

Properties
Chemical formula	(C_{5}H_{7}NO_{3})_{n}
Molar mass	Variable
- Except where otherwise noted, data are given for materials in their standard state (at 25 °C [77 °F], 100 kPa). Infobox references

Poly-γ-glutamate is a metabolite of Bacillus subtilis. Poly-γ-glutamate inhibits tyrosinase and melanogenesis in vitro.
