= Cnidocyte =

Stinging cell used by cnidarians

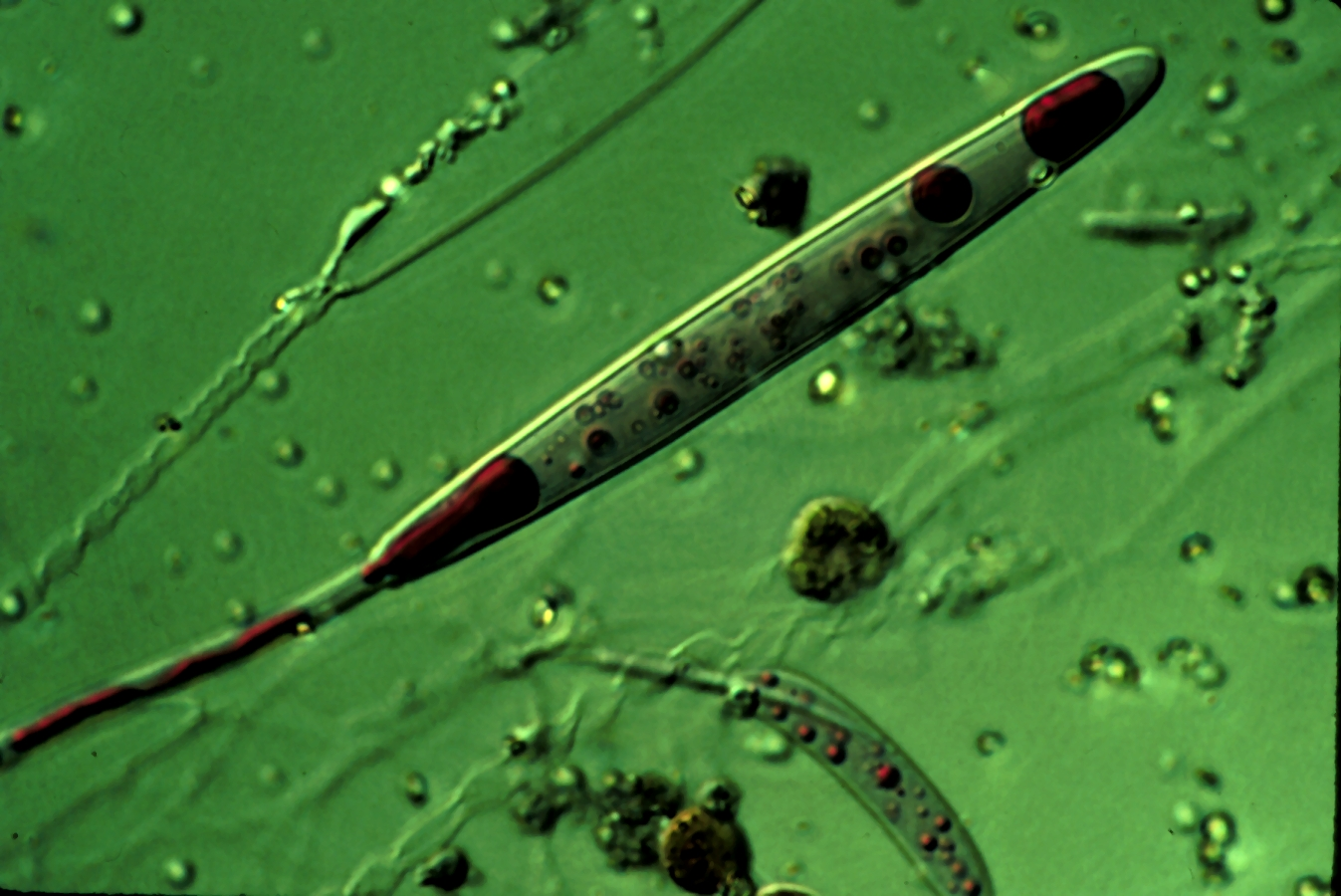
Nomarski micrograph of a ruthenium red-stained nematocyst from Aiptasia pallida, the pale anemone. The red dye stains the polyanionic venom proteins found inside the capsule of this partially-discharged nematocyst.

A cnidocyte (also known as a cnidoblast) is a type of cell containing a large secretory organelle called a cnidocyst, that can deliver a sting to other organisms as a way to subdue prey and defend against predators. A cnidocyte explosively ejects the toxin-containing cnidocyst which is responsible for the stings delivered by a cnidarian. The presence of this cell defines the phylum Cnidaria, which also includes the corals, sea anemones, hydrae, and jellyfish. Cnidocytes are single-use cells that need to be continuously replaced.

== Structure and function ==
Each cnidocyte contains an organelle called a cnidocyst, (Note: Cnidocyst—also known as a cnida (pl. cnidae), nematocyst, ptychocyst or spirocyst.) which consists of a bulb-shaped capsule and a hollow, coiled tubule that is contained within. Immature cnidocytes are referred to as cnidoblasts or nematoblasts. The externally oriented side of the cell has a hair-like trigger called a cnidocil, a mechano-chemical receptor. When the trigger is activated, the tubule shaft of the cnidocyst is ejected and, in the case of the penetrant nematocyst, the forcefully ejected tubule penetrates the target organism. This discharge takes a few microseconds, and is able to reach accelerations of about 40,000 g. Research from 2006 suggests the process occurs in as little as 700 nanoseconds, thus reaching an acceleration of up to 5,410,000 g. After penetration, the toxic content of the nematocyst is injected into the target organism, allowing the sessile cnidarian to capture the immobilized prey. Recently, in two sea anemone species (Nematostella vectensis and Anthopleura elegantissima), the type I neurotoxin protein Nv1 was shown to be localized in ectodermal gland cells in the tentacles, next to but not in nematocysts. Upon encounter with a crustacean prey, nematocysts discharge and pierce the prey, and Nv1 is massively secreted into the extracellular medium by the nearby gland cells, thus suggesting another mode of entry for toxins.

=== Cnidocyte capsule composition ===
The cnidocyte capsule is made of novel Cnidaria-specific gene products which combine known protein domains. Minicollagen gene products (proteins) are one of the major structural components of the capsule. They are very short genes containing the characteristic collagen-triple helix sequence, as well as polyproline domains and cysteine-rich domains. Trimeres of mini collagen proteins assemble through their terminal cysteine-rich domain, forming highly organized and rigid supra-structures. Minicollagen 1 Ncol-1 polymers assemble on the inner shell while the outer capsule is composed of polymerized NOWA (Nematocyst Outer Wall Antigen) proteins. Nemato Galectin, minicollagen Ncol-15 and chondroitin are novel proteins used to build the tubule shaft. In piercing cnidocytes, the novel protein spinalin is used to make the spines present at the base of the shaft.

=== Discharge mechanism ===
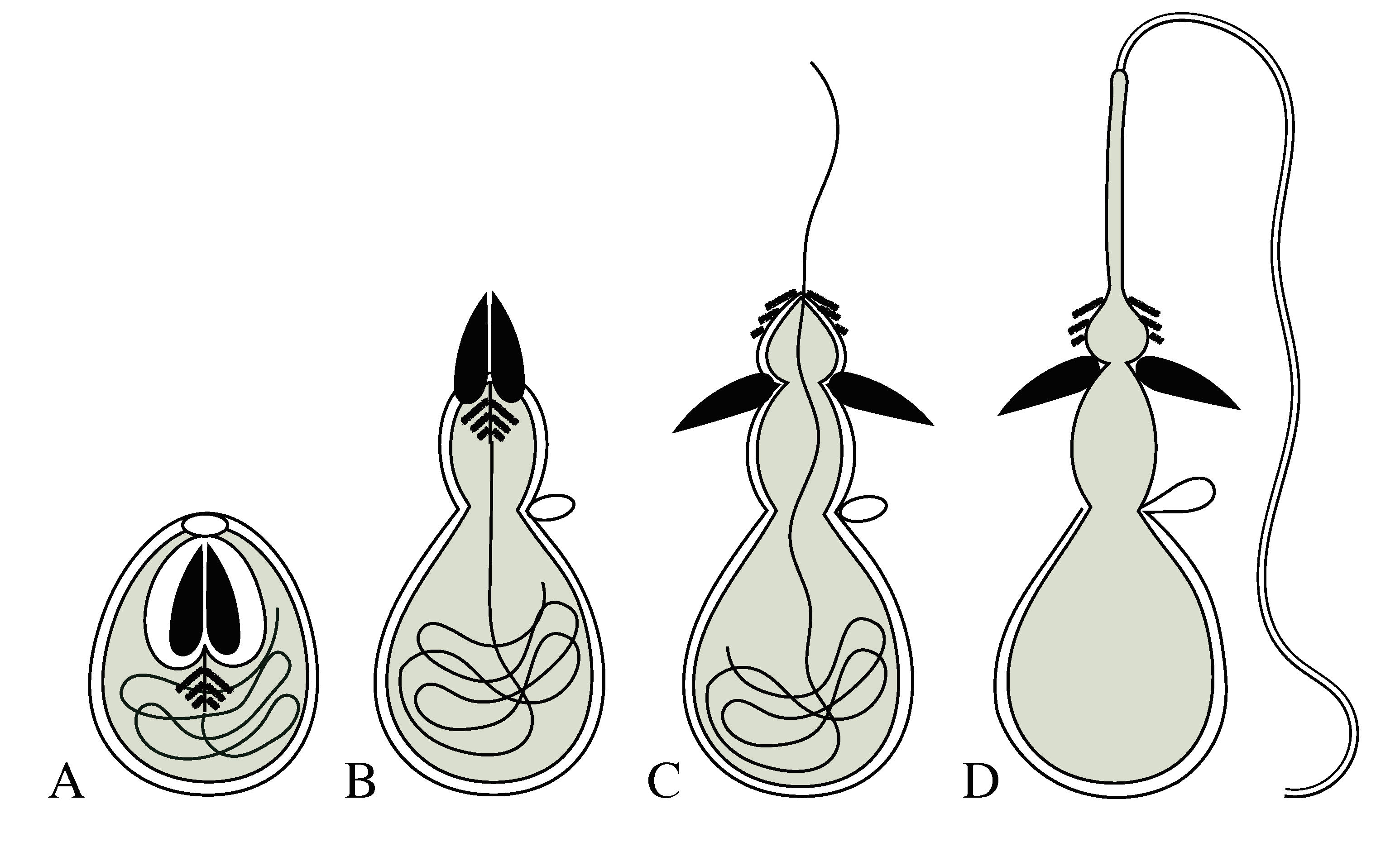
Discharge mechanism of a nematocyst.

The cnidocyst capsule stores a large concentration of calcium ions, which are released from the capsule into the cytoplasm of the cnidocyte when the trigger is activated. This causes a large concentration gradient of calcium across the cnidocyte plasma membrane. The resulting osmotic pressure causes a rapid influx of water into the cell. This increase in water volume in the cytoplasm forces the coiled cnidae tubule to eject rapidly. Prior to discharge the coiled cnidae tubule exists inside the cell in an "inside out" condition. The back pressure resulting from the influx of water into the cnidocyte together with the opening of the capsule tip structure or operculum, triggers the forceful eversion of the cnidae tubule causing it to right itself as it comes rushing out of the cell with enough force to impale a prey organism.

That force is to be calculated as the mass of the mechanism's stylet multiplied by its acceleration. The pressure that is generated by this impact into its prey is to be calculated by the stylet's force divided by its area. Researchers have calculated an ejected mass of 1 nanogram, an acceleration of 5,410,000 g and a stylet tip radius of 15 ± 8 nm. Therefore, a pressure of more than 7 GPa was estimated at the stylet tip which they write is in the range of technical bullets.

=== Fluid dynamics in nematocyst discharge ===
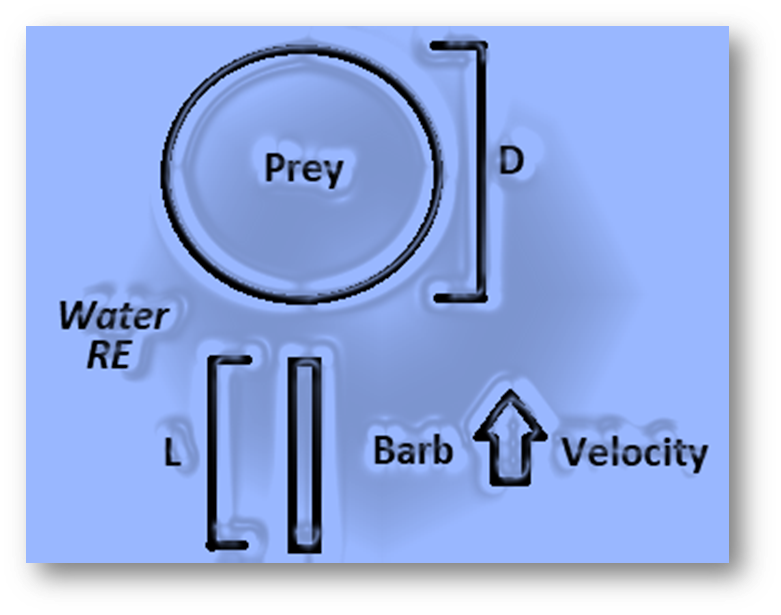
Computational fluid dynamics model parameters of nematocyst discharge.

Few papers have modeled the discharge aside from direct observation. Observational studies typically used a tentacle solution assay with a chemical stimulant to create discharge and cameras to record them. One in 1984 and another in 2006 as imaging technology improved. One study involved computational fluid dynamics where variables such as barb plate size, prey cylindrical diameter and fluid medium Reynolds number were manipulated.

Observational studies indicate that velocities of the barb/stylet decrease throughout the discharge. As such, the incredible maximum acceleration is achieved at the beginning. Dynamic traits such as maximum discharge velocities and trajectory patterns may not correspond to static traits such as tubule lengths and capsule volumes. Therefore, caution is appropriate when using medusan nematocyst assemblages as indicators of prey selection and trophic role. This is possibly the case for other jelly species and hence one cannot generally infer nematocyst static traits to prey size.

=== Prey detection ===
Cnidae are "single use" cells, and thus represent a large expenditure of energy to produce. In Hydrozoans, in order to regulate discharge, cnidocytes are connected as "batteries", containing several types of cnidocytes connected to supporting cells and neurons. The supporting cells contain chemosensors, which, together with the mechanoreceptor on the cnidocyte (cnidocil), allow only the right combination of stimuli to cause discharge, such as prey swimming, and chemicals found in prey cuticle or cutaneous tissue. This prevents the cnidarian from stinging itself although sloughed off cnidae can be induced to fire independently.

== Types of cnidae ==
Over 30 types of cnidae are found in different cnidarians. They can be divided into the following groups:

1. Nematocyst (Penetrant or Piercing): The penetrant or stenotele is the largest and most complex nematocyst. When discharged, it pierces the skin or chitinous exoskeleton of the prey and injects the venomous fluid, hypnotoxin, that either paralyzes the victim or kills it.
2. Ptychocysts (Glutinant or Adhesive): a sticky surface used to stick to prey, found on burrowing (tube) anemones, which help create the tube in which the animal lives.
3. Spirocysts (Volvent or Ensnaring): The volvent or desmoneme is a small and pear-shaped cnidocyte. It contains a short, thick, spineless, smooth and elastic thread tube forming a single loop and closed at the far end. When discharged, it tightly coils around the prey. They are the smallest cnidocytes. A lasso-like string is fired at prey and wraps around a cellular projection on the prey, which are referred to as spirocysts.

Cnidocyte subtypes can be differentially localized in the animal. In the sea anemone Nematostella vectensis, the majority of its non-penetrant sticky cnidocytes, the spherocytes, are found in the tentacles, and are thought to help with prey capture by sticking to the prey. By contrast, the two penetrant types of cnidocytes present in this species display a much broader localization, on the outer epithelial layer of the tentacles and body column, as well as on the pharynx epithelium and within mesenteries.

The diversity of cnidocytes types correlates with the expansion and diversification of structural cnidocyst genes like mini collagen genes. Minicollagen genes form compact gene clusters in Cnidarian genomes, suggesting a diversification through gene duplication and subfunctionalization. Anthozoans display less capsule diversity and a reduced number of mini collagen genes, and medusozoans have more capsule diversity (about 25 types) and a vastly expanded minicollagen genes repertoire. In the sea anemone Nematostella vectensis, some minicollagens display a differential expression pattern in different cnidocytes subtypes.

== Cnidocyte development ==
Cnidocytes are single-use cells that need to be continuously replaced throughout the life of the animal with different mode of renewal across species.

=== Modes of renewal ===
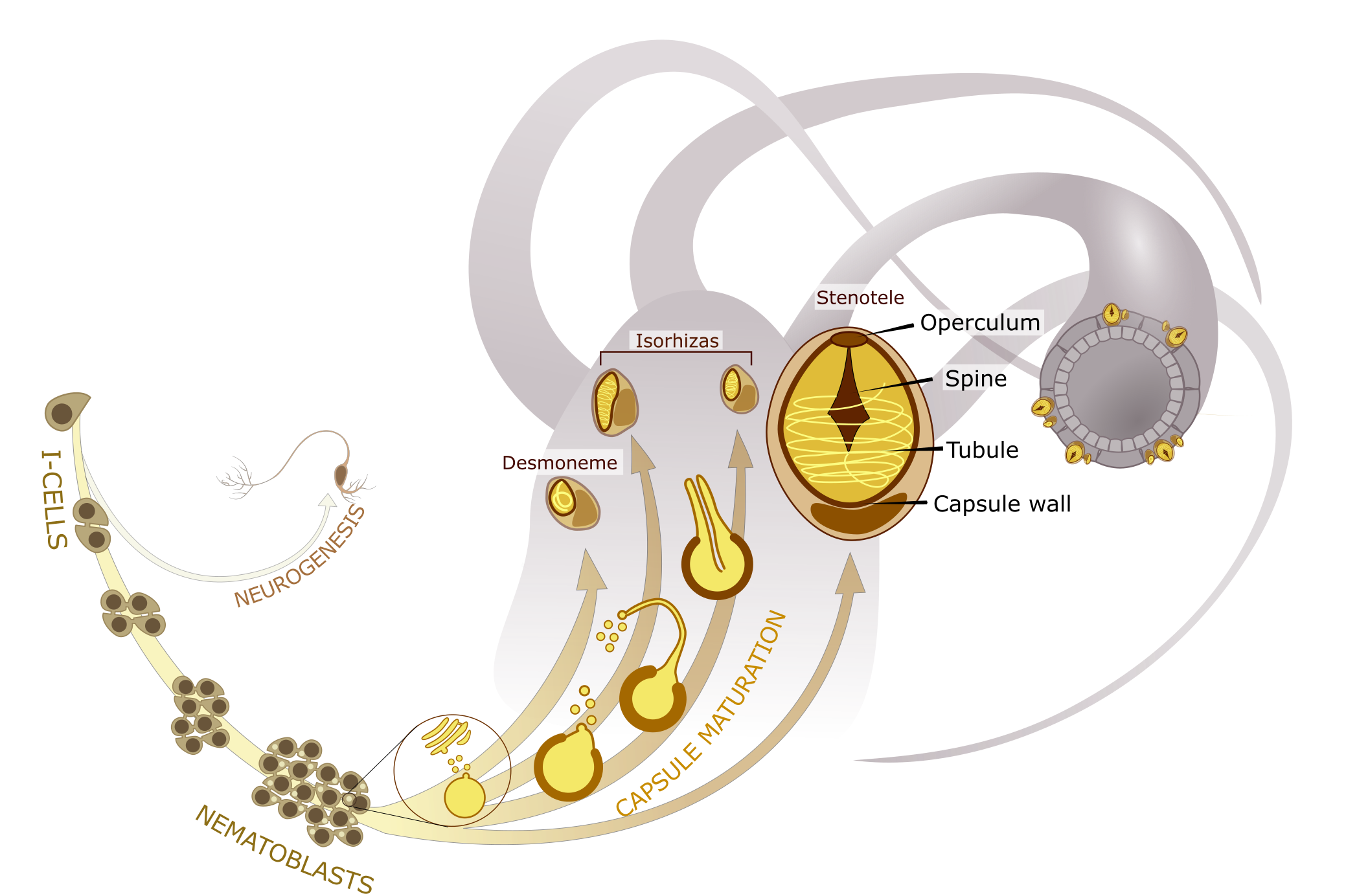
Overview of the development of the 4 different capsule types of Hydra polyps.

In Hydra polyps, cnidocytes differentiate from a specific population of stem cells, the interstitial cells (I-cells) located within the body column. Developing nematocysts first undergo multiple rounds of mitosis without cytokinesis, giving rise to nematoblast nests with 8, 16, 32 or 64 cells. After this expansion phase, nematoblasts develop their capsules. Nests separate into single nematocysts when the formation of the capsule is complete. Most of them migrate to the tentacles where they are incorporated into battery cells, which hold several nematocysts, and neurons. Battery cells coordinate firing of nematocysts.

In the hydrozoan jellyfish Clytia hemisphaerica, nematogenesis takes place at the base of the tentacles, as well as in the manubrium. At the base of the tentacles, nematoblasts proliferate then differentiate along a proximal-distal gradient, giving rise to mature nematocytes in the tentacles through a conveyor belt system.

In the Anthozoan sea anemone Nematostella vectensis, nematocytes are thought to develop throughout the animal from epithelial progenitors. Furthermore, a single regulatory gene that codes for the transcription factor ZNF845 also called CnZNF1 promotes the development of a cnidocyte and inhibits the development of a RFamide producing neuron cell. This gene evolved in the stem cnidarian through domain shuffling.

=== Cnidocyst maturation ===
The nematocyst forms through a multi-step assembly process from a giant post-Golgi vacuole. Vesicles from the Golgi apparatus first fuse onto a primary vesicle: the capsule primordium. Subsequent vesicle fusion enables the formation of a tubule outside of the capsule, which then invaginates into the capsule. Then, an early maturation phase enables the formation of long arrays of barbed spines onto the invaginated tubule through the condensation of spinalin proteins. Finally, a late maturation stage gives rise to undischarged capsules under high osmotic pressure through the synthesis of poly-γ-glutamate into the matrix of the capsule. This trapped osmotic pressure enables rapid thread discharge upon triggering through a massive osmotic shock.

== Nematocyst toxicity ==
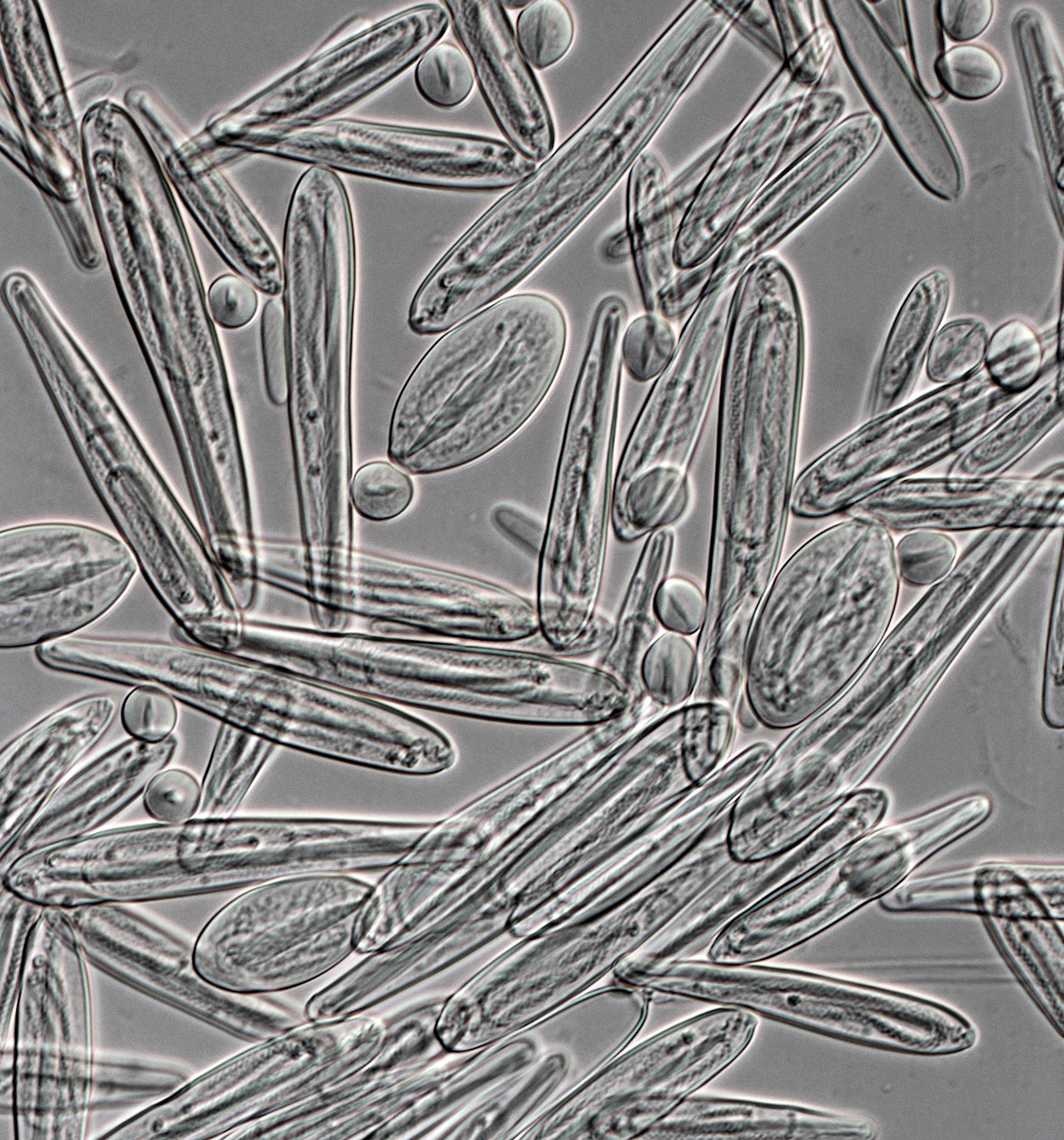
Nematocysts from Chironex fleckeri (400x magnification).

Nematocysts are very efficient weapons. A single nematocyst has been shown to suffice in paralyzing a small arthropod (Drosophila larva). The most deadly cnidocytes (to humans, at least) are found on the body of a box jellyfish. One member of this family, the sea wasp, Chironex fleckeri, is "claimed to be the most venomous marine animal known," according to the Australian Institute of Marine Science. It can cause excruciating pain to humans, sometimes followed by death. Other cnidarians, such as the jellyfish Cyanea capillata (the "Lion's Mane" made famous by Sherlock Holmes) or the siphonophore Physalia physalis (Portuguese man o' war, "Bluebottle") can cause extremely painful and sometimes fatal stings. On the other hand, aggregating sea anemones may have the lowest sting intensity, perhaps due to the inability of the nematocysts to penetrate the skin, creating a feeling similar to touching sticky candies. Besides feeding and defense, sea anemone and coral colonies use cnidocytes to sting one another in order to defend or win space. Despite their effectiveness in prey-predator interactions, there is an evolutionary tradeoff as cnidarian venom systems are known to reduce the cnidarian's reproductive fitness and overall growth.

Venom from animals such as cnidarians, scorpions and spiders may be species-specific. A substance that is weakly toxic for humans or other mammals may be strongly toxic to the natural prey or predators of the venomous animal. Such specificity has been used to create new medicines and bioinsecticides, and biopesticides.

Animals in the phylum Ctenophora ("sea-gooseberries" or "comb jellies") are transparent and jelly-like but have no nematocysts, and are harmless to humans.

Certain types of sea slugs, such as the nudibranch aeolids, are known to undergo kleptocnidy (in addition to kleptoplasty), whereby the organisms store nematocysts of digested prey at the tips of their cerata.

== See also ==
- Cnidosac, the sac in which an aeolid nudibranch stores the cnidocytes from its prey species
