= Ocean surface ecosystem =

Organisms on the ocean's surface

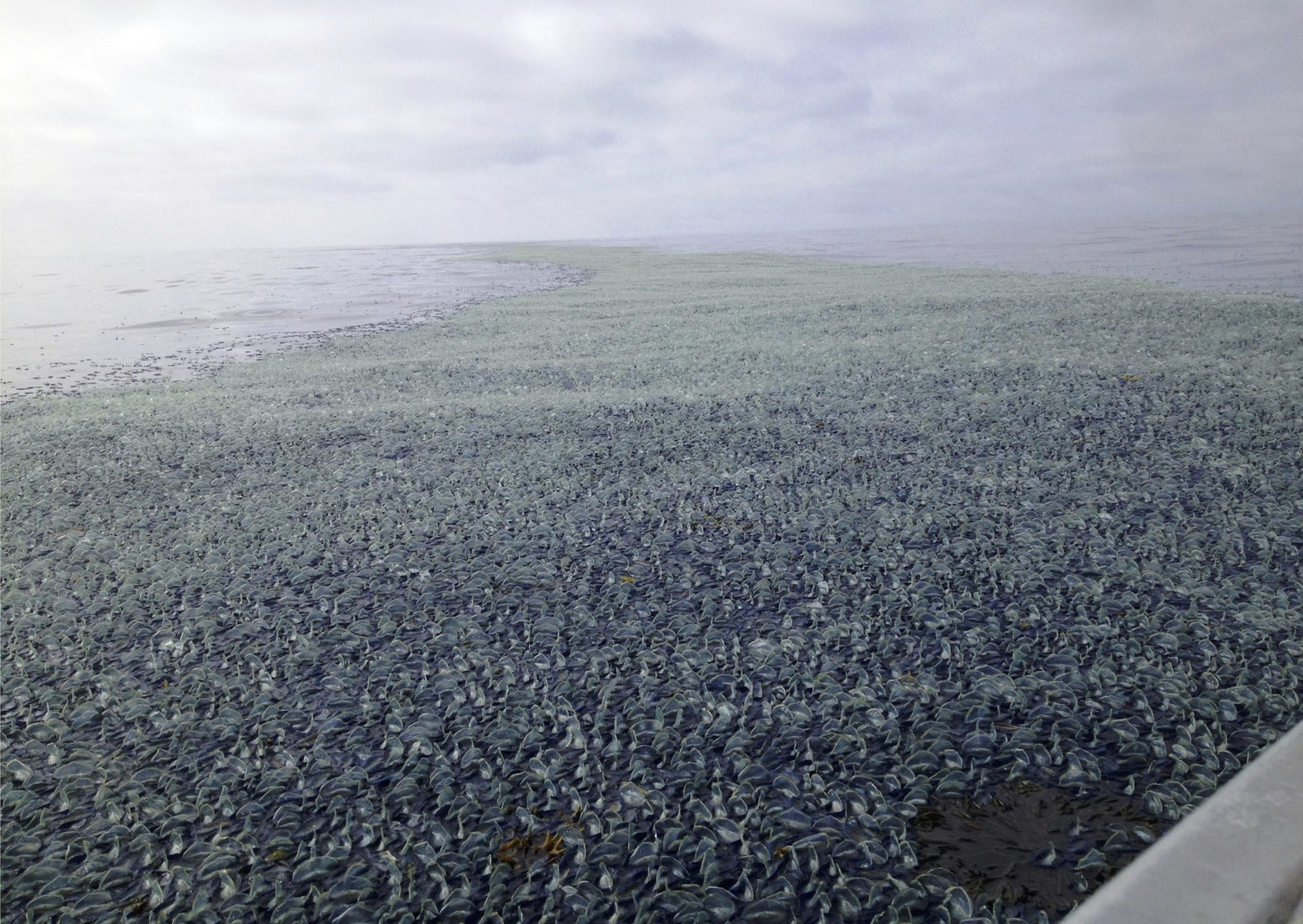
By-the-wind sailors Velella sp. covering the ocean's surface

Organisms that live freely at the ocean surface, termed neuston, include keystone organisms like the golden seaweed Sargassum that makes up the Sargasso Sea, floating barnacles, marine snails, nudibranchs, and cnidarians. Many ecologically and economically important fish species live as or rely upon neuston. Species at the surface are not distributed uniformly; the ocean's surface provides habitat for unique neustonic communities and ecoregions found at only certain latitudes and only in specific ocean basins. But the surface is also on the front line of climate change and pollution. Life on the ocean's surface connects worlds. From shallow waters to the deep sea, the open ocean to rivers and lakes, numerous terrestrial and marine species depend on the surface ecosystem and the organisms found there.

The ocean's surface acts like a skin between the atmosphere above and the water below, and hosts an ecosystem unique to this environment. This sun-drenched habitat can be defined as roughly one metre in depth, as nearly half of UV-B is attenuated within this first meter. Organisms here must contend with wave action and unique chemical and physical properties. The surface is utilised by a wide range of species, from various fish and cetaceans, to species that ride on ocean debris (termed rafters).

Most prominently, the surface is home to a unique community of free-living organisms, termed neuston (from the Greek word νέω, which means both to swim and to float). Floating organisms are also sometimes referred to as pleuston, though neuston is more commonly used. Despite the diversity and importance of the ocean's surface in connecting disparate habitats, and the risks it faces, not a lot is known about neustonic life.

== Overview ==
Neuston are key ecological links connecting ecosystems as far ranging as coral reefs, islands, the deep sea, and even freshwater habitats. In the North Pacific, 80% of the loggerhead turtle diet consists of neuston prey, and nearly 30% of the Laysan albatross's diet is neuston. Diverse pelagic and reef fish species live at the surface when young, including commercially important fish species like the Atlantic cod, salmon, and billfish. Neuston can be concentrated as living islands that completely obscure the sea surface, or scattered into sparse meadows over thousands of miles. Yet the role of the neuston, and in many cases their mere existence, is often overlooked.

One of the most well-known surface ecoregions is the Sargasso Sea, an ecologically distinct region packed with thick, neustonic brown seaweed in the North Atlantic. Multiple ecologically and commercially important species depend on the Sargasso Sea, but neustonic life exists in every ocean basin and may serve a similar, if unrecognised, role in regions across the planet. For example, over 50 years ago, USSR scientist A. I. Savilov characterised 7 neustonic ecoregions in the Pacific Ocean. Each ecoregion possesses a unique combination of biotic and abiotic conditions and hosts a unique community of neustonic organisms. Yet these ecoregions have been largely forgotten.

But there is another reason to study neuston: The ocean's surface is on the front line of human impacts, from climate change to pollution, oil spills to plastic. The ocean's surface is hit hard by anthropogenic change, and the surface ecosystem is likely already dramatically different from even a few hundred years ago. For example, prior to widespread damming, logging, and industrialisation, more wood may have entered the open ocean, while plastic had not yet been invented. And because floating life provides food and shelter for diverse species, changes in the surface habitat will cause changes in other ecosystems and have implications that are not currently fully understand or be able to be predicted.

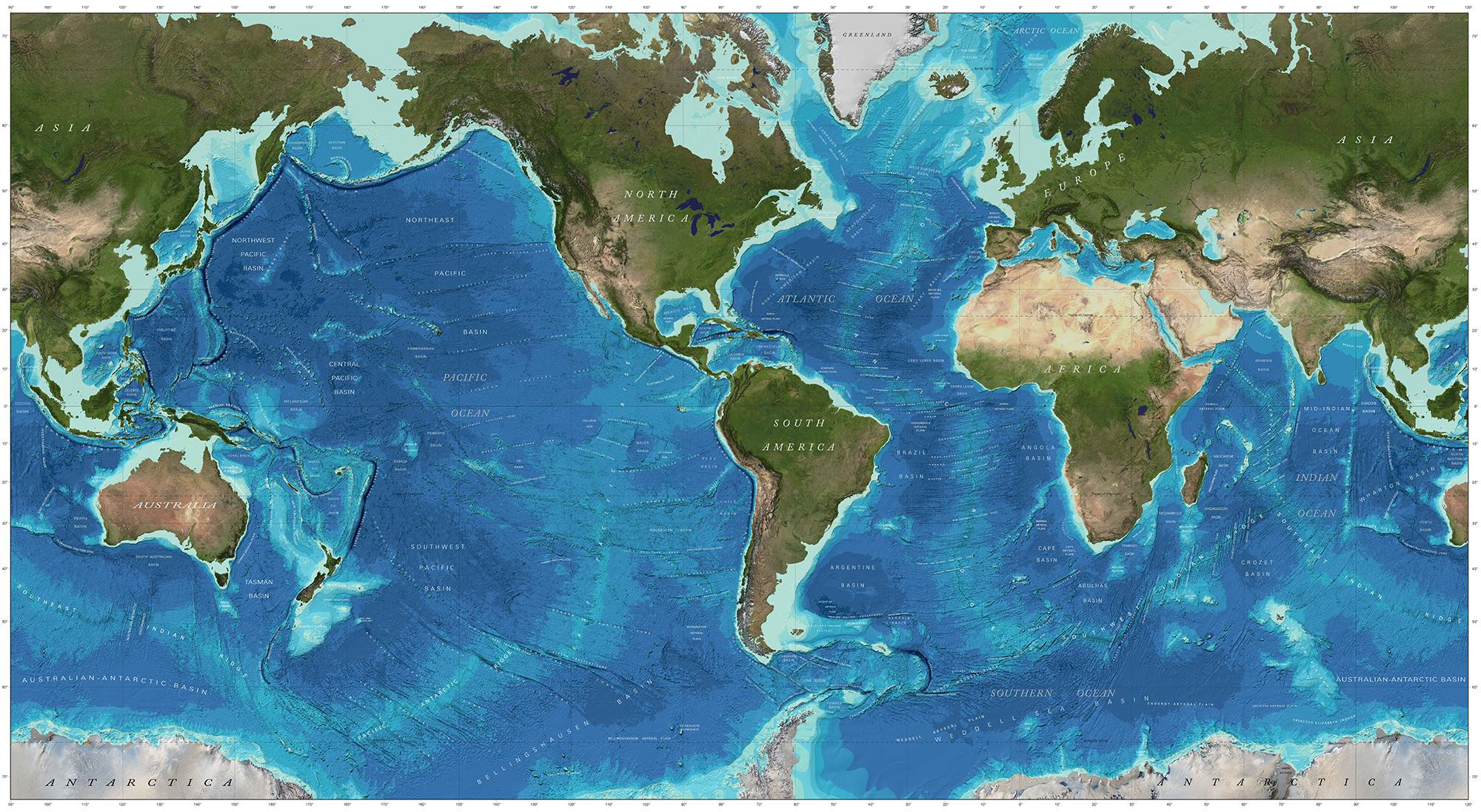
Ocean surfaces occupy 72% of the Earth's total surface. They can be divided into surfaces of the relatively shallow and nutrient rich coastal areas above the continental shelves (light blue), and surfaces of the more expansive and relatively deeper but nutrient poor ocean that lies beyond (deep blue).

External videos
- Neuston nets – YouTube

"Just before it was dark, as they passed a great island of Sargasso weed that heaved and swung in the light sea as though the ocean were making love with something under a yellow blanket, his small line was taken by a dolphin." — Ernest Hemingway, The Old Man and the Sea.

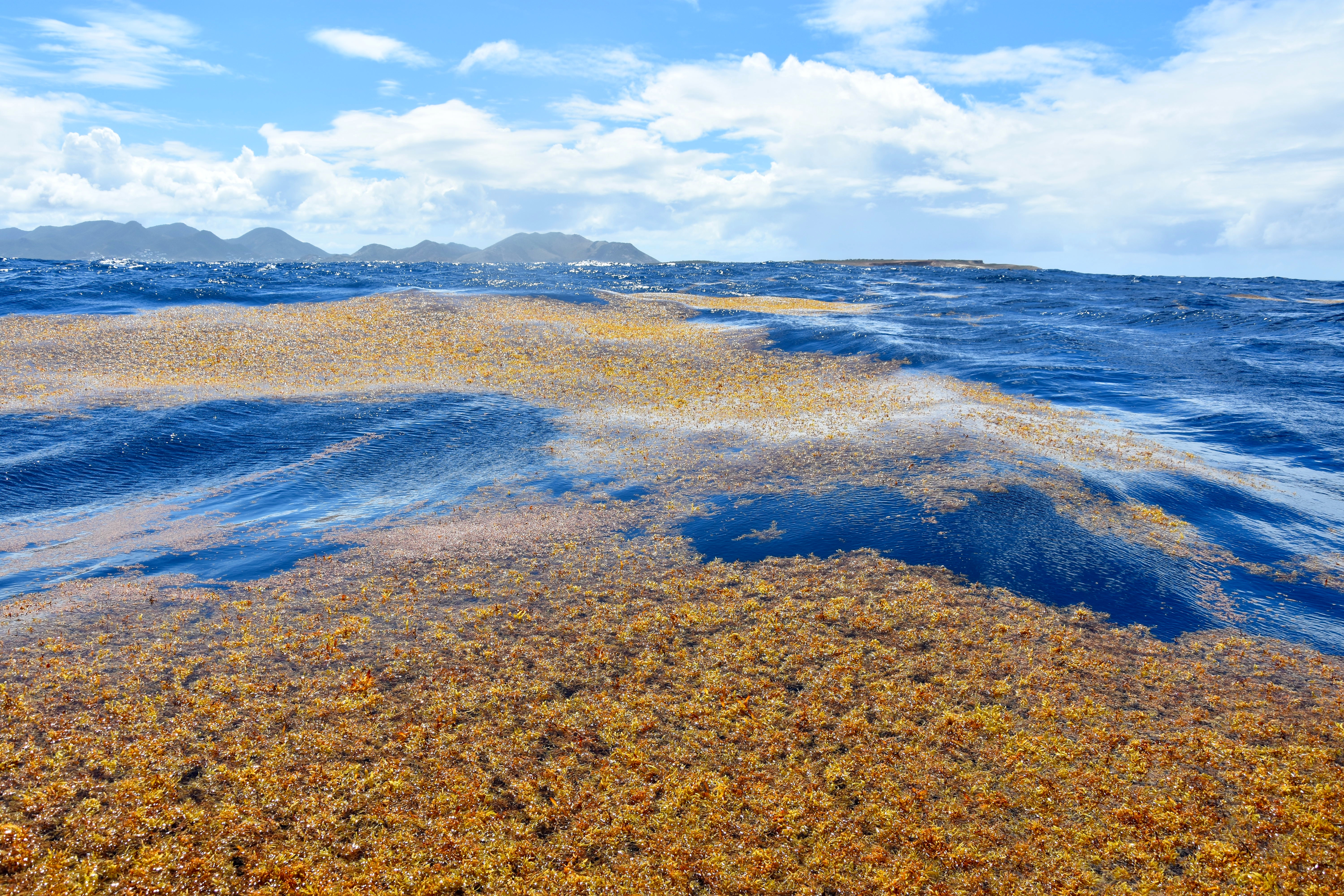
Sargassum off Tintamarre Island
in the Saint-Martin national nature reserve

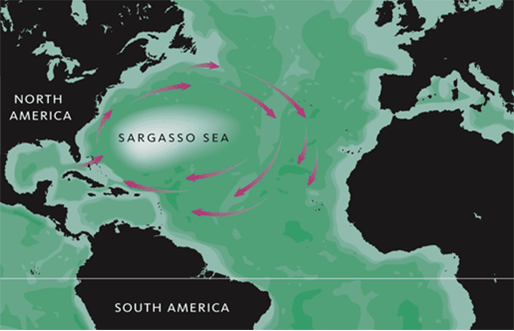
Sargasso sea

== Ocean surface life (neuston) ==
Invoking images of the open ocean's surface, the imagination can conjure up an endless empty space. A flat line parting the blue below from the blue above. But in reality a diverse array of species occupy this unique boundary layer. A tangle of terms exist for different organisms occupying different niches of the ocean's surface. The most inclusive term, neuston, is used here to refer to all of them.

Neustonic animals and plants live hanging from the surface of the ocean as if suspended from the roof of a massive cave, and are incapable of controlling their direction of movement. They are considered permanent residents of the surface layer. Many genera are globally distributed. Many organisms have morphological features that enable them to remain at the ocean's surface, with the most noticeable adaptations being floats.

=== Floaters (pleuston) ===
Floaters, sometimes called pleuston, are the organisms that live floating at the ocean surface.
Cnidarians (jellyfish)	Velella, Porpita, Physalia, and Actinecta Numerous floating cnidarians (jellyfish) live at the ocean's surface, some famous (or infamous) and others rarely seen. Species like Velella sp. (by-the-wind sailor) and Porpita sp. (blue button) are central to the surface food web. They possess symbiotic dinoflagellates in their tissue, and like their benthic coral cousins, these symbionts may allow them to survive in oligotrophic waters. Velella and Porpita are the only two genera of the chondrophore clade within Hydrozoa, and likely evolved convergently with another neustonic Hydrozoan genera: Physalia (Portuguese man-o-war). Both Physalia and Velella poses "sails", which allow them to travel based on wind direction. These by-the-wind sailors float near the surface of the ocean with their tentacles hanging below in the water. Velella has a raised transparent "sail" on a blue oval disk. Short fringing tentacles hang below from the disc. Movement is powered by wind hitting the sail. Some Velella have a right-hand sail and some a left-hand sail, ensuring they don't all get blown in the one direction at the same time. Physalia also utilises trailing tentacles that serve as a sea anchor on in the open ocean, and pack a powerful sting. Sea anemones in the genus Actinecta are rarely seen, but also float submerged on the ocean's surface, similar to Porpita, but using a bubble float on the pedal disc. By-the-wind sailor Velella velella washed ashore on sand By-the-wind sailor Velella sp. Porpita porpita Blue button Porpita sp. Floating anemone Actinecta sp. Portuguese man-o-war Physalia sp.
Mollusks (marine snails)	The mollusks Janthina, Recluzia, and Glaucus Bubble rafting snails Recluzia and Janthina construct floating rafts by dipping their anterior foot into the water's surface and wrapping trapped air in a layer of mucus to form a bubble, which they then adhere to a raft. The enigmatic Recluzia feeds upon the sea anemone Actinecta, and both are brown-yellow in colour. In contrast, the violet snails Janthina prey on Velella, Porpita, and sometimes Physalia [3], though they cannot move or hunt. Instead, Janthina rely on passive contact with their prey. Other species include the nudibranch Glaucus (blue sea dragon), which also feeds on floating hydrozoans and swallows air to stay afloat. There are multiple cryptic species of Glaucus, and species in this genus may show a high degree of regional isolation. The violet snail, Janthina sp., feeds on the by-the-wind sailor. Janthina janthina with its bubble raft The blue sea dragon uses the surface tension of the water to float upside down. Blue sea dragons Glaucus sp. Marine snail Recluzia sp.
Crustacean	Single buoy barnacle attached to a float it constructed itself Colony of buoy barnacles washed onto a beach attached to a communal float The only truly neustonic barnacle, Dosima fascicularis (Buoy barnacle) lives at the ocean's surface by first attaching to floating objects as larvae (such as feathers), and secreting an airy pillow-like float rather than the normal hard cement used by other barnacles. This float allows Dosima barnacles to eventually outgrow their larval home and drift independently.
Macroalgae (seaweed)	Sargassum fish well camouflaged in Sargassum seaweed Sargassum sp. seaweed Turbinaria ornata detaches older buoyant fronds that travel on surface currents, sometimes in large rafts. Neustonic seaweeds like Sargassum fluitans and Sargassum natans have numerous gas-filled floats to remain at the ocean's surface. These algae create habitat for a variety of Sargassum-associated species, particularly at the western edge of the North Atlantic Subtropical Gyre, known as the Sargasso Sea. In the Pacific the algal genus Turbinaria reproduces with floating fronts. In addition, over 20 species of algal have been found floating at the surface, and eight species of sea grass.
Microorganisms (bacteria, protists etc.)	Trichodesmium bloom Diverse microorganisms occupy the ocean's surface ecosystem, and may play a significant role in gas exchange between the ocean and atmosphere. Many of these organisms have been identified from the sea surface microlayer, which, depending on definition, extends from 100 to 1000 μm below the ocean's surface. The ocean's surface has unique chemical and physical properties that may concentrate species specifically adapted to these conditions. For example, bacterioneuston living in the sea surface microlayer are often brightly coloured, possibly as protection against solar radiation. The surface microlayer may be largely dominated by heterotrophic organisms, including both bacteria and microeukaryotes, which take advantage of surface associated compounds. Other species may extend beyond the sea-surface microlayer but still associated with the surface, including the ecologically important cyanobacterium Trichodesmium. Still, as with larger organisms, surface microorganisms are generally poorly known.

=== Epineuston ===
Epineuston are organisms that use water surface tension to keep them on the ocean surface.
Insects	Aggregation of sea skaters There are very few marine insects. The only true open-ocean insects are Halobates. Epineustonic organisms live on the water's surface, and in the open ocean all epineustonic species belong to the insect genus Halobates. Known as "sea skaters", Halobates sp. prey on other neustonic species and zooplankton trapped at the surface. Halobates lay eggs on a variety of objects, including floating feathers, wood, plastic etc., and unusually on pelagic molluscs like Atlanta turriculata.

=== Hyponeuston ===
Hyponeuston are the mobile organisms that live immediately below the surface.
Copepods	Male pontellid copepod A wide variety of copepods can be found at the ocean's surface. Some neustonic copepods possess remarkable adaptations, especially within the pontellid copepods. Pontellid adaptations include specialised surface attachment structures, blue pigmentation. and even flying behavior to escape predators. Sapphirinidae copepods are often also associated with the surface, and some species have incredible structural colouration. As in many marine ecosystems, copepods represent a major food source for a variety of neustonic and surface-associated species. The sea surface microlayer (SML) at the air-sea interface is a distinct, under-studied habitat compared to the subsurface and copepods, important components of ocean food webs, have developed key adaptations to exploit this niche. The ocean-spanning SML forms the boundary between the atmosphere and the hydrosphere. Despite having a thickness of less than one millimetre, the SML has profoundly different physicochemical and biological characteristics from the underlying water (ULW). The SML provides a biogenic gelatinous framework and is typically enriched with organic matter, heterotrophic microorganisms as well as higher trophic level organisms. Among zooplankton taxa living within the SML, neustonic copepods (phylum Arthropoda, class Crustacea) of the family Pontellidae have been frequently recorded in tropical regions of all oceans. The SML is regarded as a challenging or even extreme habitat because organisms are exposed to variable temperatures and high intensities of solar and ultraviolet (UV) radiation. Copepods are the most abundant metazoans on Earth and show impressive short-term adaptation to environmental stressors, e.g. downregulation of the cellular heat stress response. Given their major role in marine food webs and ecosystem functioning, knowledge of the tolerance limits of copepods to abiotic factors is essential if robust projections of the effects of global change on the world's oceans are to be possible. The effects of climate-driven warming (and acidification) on the SML ecosystem and neuston-dwelling copepods, although scarcely examined to date, may be particularly dramatic. A feature of many pontellid copepods is their blue colouring, that also occurs in other surface-dwelling mesozooplankton. The colouring results from a complex of the pigment astaxanthin and a carotenoprotein. Astaxanthin can be produced from dietary sources and was found to be the principal carotenoid in four different blue-pigmented copepod genera as well as in Oikopleura dioica of the class Appendicularia indicating convergent evolution of the feature in different neuston inhabitants. Various theories have been developed to explain the significance of the blue colouring in copepods, including protection from strong solar and/or UV radiation, camouflage against visual predators that forage in the uppermost water layers as well as recognition of conspecifics when occurring together with copepods that possess a green fluorescent protein (GFP)-based coloration.
Isopods	The isopod Idotea metallica Idotea metallica is a remarkable surface-associated isopod, that can be found either floating upside down on the ocean's surface or attached to floating debris or neuston (such as the bubble rafts of Janthina). It is commonly associated with flotsam, and is capable of actively swimming from one floating object to another. This species ostensibly occurs globally in warm waters, though as with many surface-associated species, information on its genetic diversity is scarce. It is often flushed into more northern regions by shifting currents. For individuals arriving in the summer months in Helgoland (Germany; North Sea) the fundamental thermal niche is 16 °C, with the coldest tolerable temperature likely around 13 °C. However, these thermal tolerance limits should be considered with caution: like many neustonic species, I. metallica is poorly studied, and whether it is truly one species or many cryptic species is unclear.
Shrimp	Hippolytid shrimp perched on a discarded Janthina bubble raft Several species of shrimp are associated with floating Sargassum, and may also be found swimming at the surface, including Latreutes fucorum and Hippolyte coerulescens. Neustonic shrimp exhibit a remarkable array of colour patterns, including the common neustonic blue, with chromophores that can respond to changing light conditions.
Fish	flying fish juvenile flying fish halfbeak A remarkable diversity of fish spend their early life at the ocean's surface. This list includes many well-known, ecologically, and economically important species from a variety of habitats. Pelagic fish species include some anchovy, mahi-mahi, marlins, swordfish, amberjack and Atlantic mackerel. Well-known and ecologically important benthic fish associate with the surface when young, including species of: lefteye flounder, blenny, goby, seahorses, seadragons and pipefish. Deep-sea fish with surface larvae include viperfish and lanternfish. Many eels, both reef, benthic, and deep-sea, nocturnally migrate to the surface layer as larvae. But while the ocean's surface may seem like an odd habitat for larval deep-sea fish, they are far from the most unusual. Diverse fish that migrate into freshwater as adults (either as a habitat or spawning ground) rely on the neuston when young. Yearling and sub-yearling salmon of various species consume neustonic prey in the northern California Current. American and European eels swim from their freshwater rivers and converge in the middle of the North Atlantic to spawn in the Sargasso Sea. Some fish occupy the ocean's surface for their whole lives, and are even capable of soaring above the waves, including flying fish and halfbeaks. Others frequent the ocean's surface, including basking species like sunfish and basking sharks.
Cephalopods	Juvenile female argonaut octopus While no cephalopod is confined to the surface layer permanently, some frequent the surface habitat and are adapted to utilise it. Female argonaut octopus (Argonauta spp.) dip their paper-like shell into the air, trapping gas bubbles that they then use to maintain buoyancy. Diverse flying squid species in the Ommastrephidae and Onychoteuthidae can launch themselves from the water and soar for impressive distances, some can reach highs of over three metres and others can sail for distances up to 55 metres.

=== Rafting organisms ===
Rafting species live either attached to neustonic organisms (e.g. barnacles that settle on Janthina shells) or inanimate debris.
barnacles (encrusters)	The gooseneck barnacle rafts on marine debris. Rafting species live either attached to neustonic organisms (e.g. barnacles that settle on Janthina shells) or inanimate debris. Some rafting species have evolved to live on debris at the ocean's surface, such as the smooth gooseneck barnacle Lepas anatifera, while others may be coastal species that settle on near-shore floating debris and are then transported by currents to the open ocean. Several excellent reviews cover the biology of rafters, including the floating substrata of rafters, the rafting community, and the biogeographical and evolutionary consequences of rafting.

== Surface microlayer ==
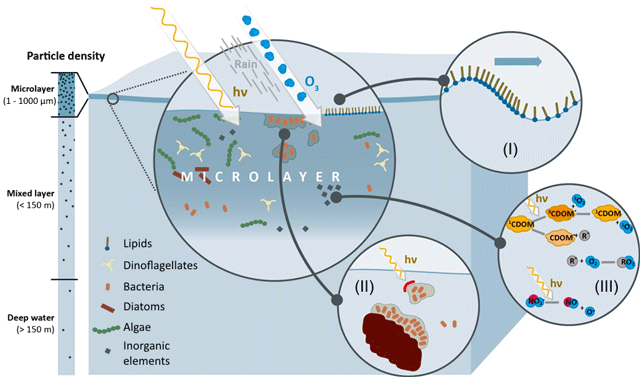
Sea surface microlayer as a biochemical microreactor (I) Unique chemical orientation, reaction and aggregation (II) Distinct microbial communities processing dissolved and particulate organic matter (III) Highest exposure of solar radiation drives photochemical reactions and formation of radicals

The sea surface microlayer (SML) is the boundary interface between the atmosphere and ocean, covering about 70% of the Earth's surface. With an operationally defined thickness between 1 and 1000 μm, the SML has physicochemical and biological properties that are measurably distinct from underlying waters. Recent studies now indicate that the SML covers the ocean to a significant extent, and evidence shows that it is an aggregate-enriched biofilm environment with distinct microbial communities. Because of its unique position at the air-sea interface, the SML is central to a range of global biogeochemical and climate-related processes.

The sea surface microlayer (SML) is the boundary interface between the atmosphere and ocean, covering about 70% of the Earth's surface. The SML has physicochemical and biological properties that are measurably distinct from underlying waters. Because of its unique position at the air-sea interface, the SML is central to a range of global biogeochemical and climate-related processes. Although known for the last six decades, the SML often has remained in a distinct research niche, primarily as it was not thought to exist under typical oceanic conditions. Recent studies now indicate that the SML covers the ocean to a significant extent, highlighting its global relevance as the boundary layer linking two major components of the Earth system – the ocean and the atmosphere.

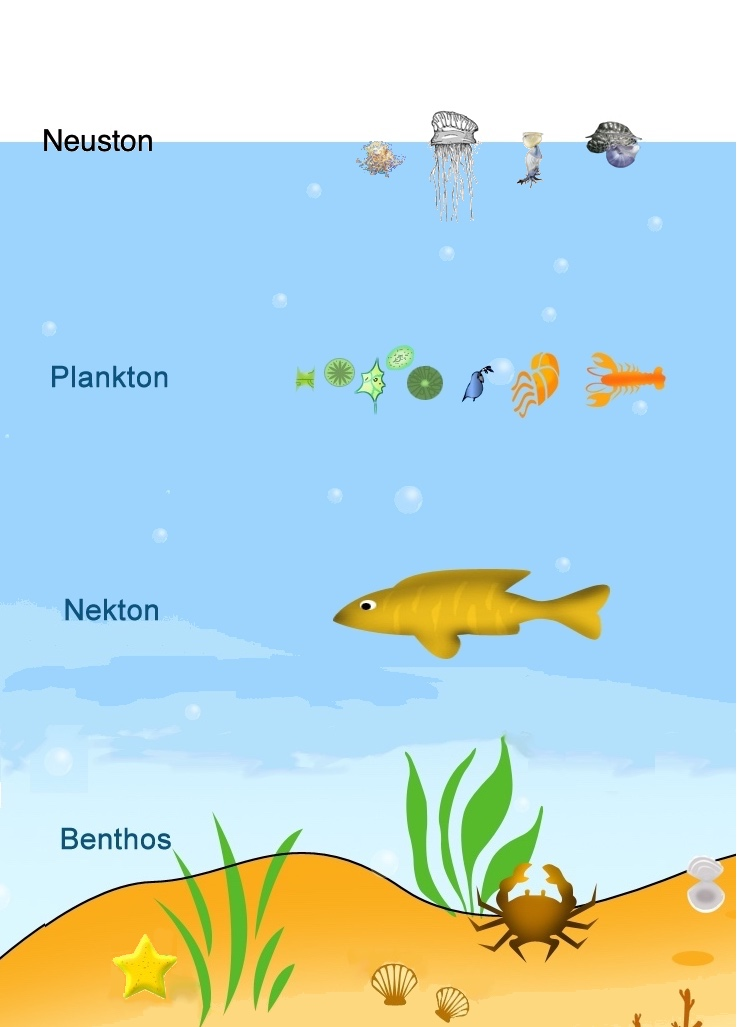
Marine neuston (organisms that live at the ocean surface) can be contrasted with plankton (organisms that drift with water currents), nekton (organisms that can swim against water currents) and benthos (organisms that live at the ocean floor).

In 1983, Sieburth hypothesised that the SML was a hydrated gel-like layer formed by a complex mixture of carbohydrates, proteins, and lipids. In recent years, his hypothesis has been confirmed, and scientific evidence indicates that the SML is an aggregate-enriched biofilm environment with distinct microbial communities. In 1999 Ellison et al. estimated that 200 Tg C yr^{−1} accumulates in the SML, similar to sedimentation rates of carbon to the ocean's seabed, though the accumulated carbon in the SML probably has a very short residence time. Although the total volume of the microlayer is very small compared to the ocean's volume, Carlson suggested in his seminal 1993 paper that unique interfacial reactions may occur in the SML that may not occur in the underlying water or at a much slower rate there. He therefore hypothesised that the SML plays an important role in the diagenesis of carbon in the upper ocean. Biofilm-like properties and highest possible exposure to solar radiation leads to an intuitive assumption that the SML is a biochemical microreactor.

Historically, the SML has been summarized as being a microhabitat composed of several layers distinguished by their ecological, chemical and physical properties with an operational total thickness of between 1 and 1000 μm. In 2005 Hunter defined the SML as a "microscopic portion of the surface ocean which is in contact with the atmosphere and which may have physical, chemical or biological properties that are measurably different from those of adjacent sub-surface waters". He avoids a definite range of thickness as it depends strongly on the feature of interest. A thickness of 60 μm has been measured based on sudden changes of the pH, and could be meaningfully used for studying the physicochemical properties of the SML. At such thickness, the SML represents a laminar layer, free of turbulence, and greatly affecting the exchange of gases between the ocean and atmosphere. As a habitat for neuston (surface-dwelling organisms ranging from bacteria to larger siphonophores), the thickness of the SML in some ways depends on the organism or ecological feature of interest. In 2005, Zaitsev described the SML and associated near-surface layer (down to 5 cm) as an incubator or nursery for eggs and larvae for a wide range of aquatic organisms.

Hunter's definition includes all interlinked layers from the laminar layer to the nursery without explicit reference to defined depths. In 2017, Wurl er al. proposed Hunter's definition be validated with a redeveloped SML paradigm that includes its global presence, biofilm-like properties and role as a nursery. The new paradigm pushes the SML into a new and wider context relevant to many ocean and climate sciences.

According to Wurl et al.m the SML can never be devoid of organics due to the abundance of surface-active substances (e.g., surfactants) in the upper ocean and the phenomenon of surface tension at air-liquid interfaces. The SML is analogous to the thermal boundary layer, and remote sensing of the sea surface temperature shows ubiquitous anomalies between the sea surface skin and bulk temperature. Even so, the differences in both are driven by different processes. Enrichment, defined as concentration ratios of an analyte in the SML to the underlying bulk water, has been used for decades as evidence for the existence of the SML. Consequently, depletions of organics in the SML are debatable; however, the question of enrichment or depletion is likely to be a function of the thickness of the SML (which varies with sea state; including losses via sea spray, the concentrations of organics in the bulk water, and the limitations of sampling techniques to collect thin layers . Enrichment of surfactants, and changes in the sea surface temperature and salinity, serve as universal indicators for the presence of the SML. Organisms are perhaps less suitable as indicators of the SML because they can actively avoid the SML and/or the harsh conditions in the SML may reduce their populations. However, the thickness of the SML remains "operational" in field experiments because the thickness of the collected layer is governed by the sampling method. Advances in SML sampling technology are needed to improve our understanding of how the SML influences air-sea interactions.

== Surface slicks ==
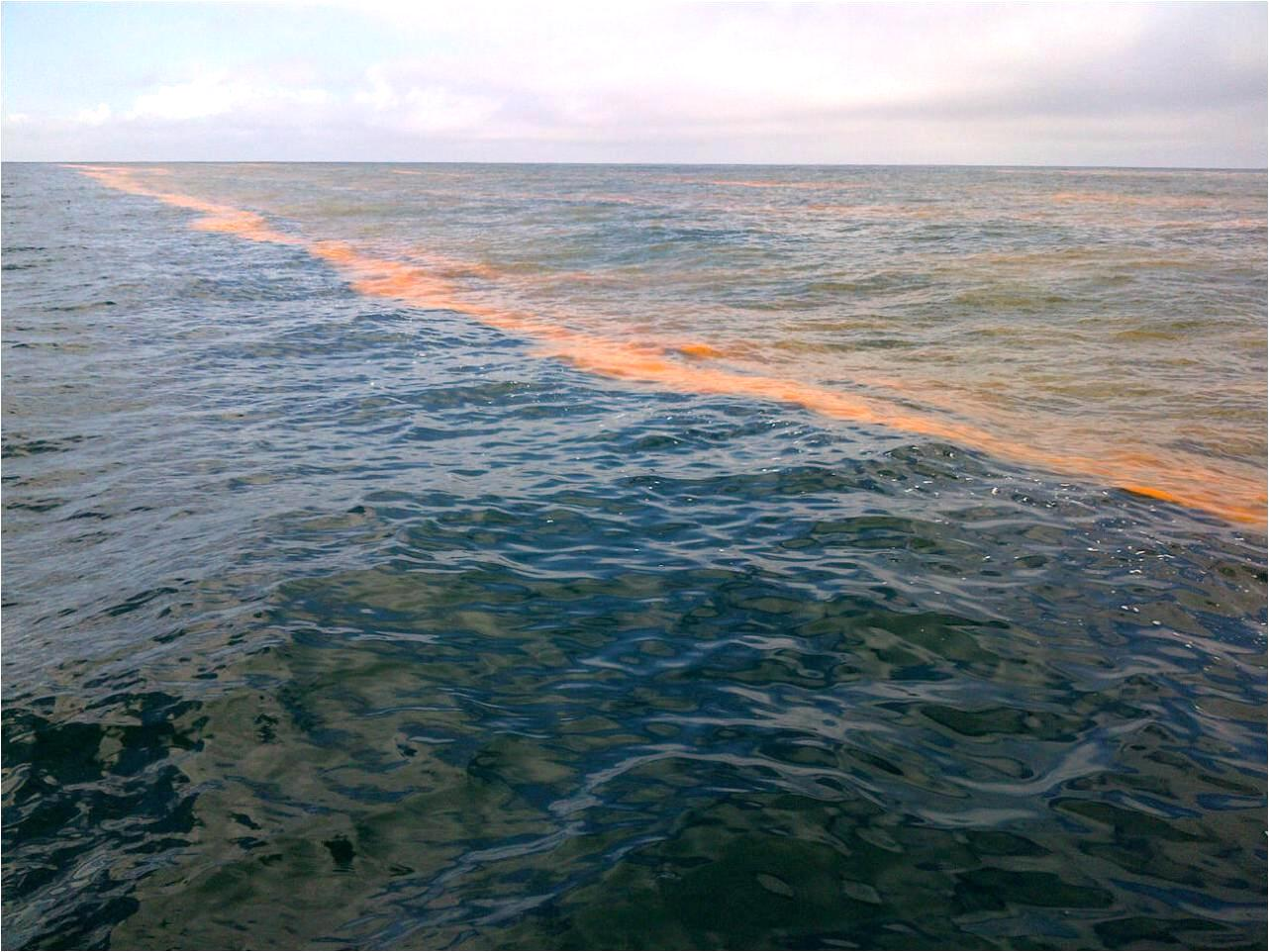
Surface slick indicating a coastal front

Slicks are meandering lines of smooth water on the ocean surface that are ubiquitous coastal features around the world. A variety of mechanisms can cause slick formation, including tidal and headland fronts, and as a consequence of subsurface waves called internal waves. Internal wave slicks are generated when internal waves interact with steep seafloor topography and drive areas of convergence and divergence at the ocean surface. The build-up of organic material (surfactants) at the surface modifies surface tension causing a smooth, oil slick-like appearance. The convergent flow can accumulate dense aggregations of plankton including larval fish and invertebrates at or below the ocean surface.

Surface slicks are the focal point for numerous trophic and larval connections that are foundational for marine ecosystem function. Life for many marine organisms begins near the ocean surface. Buoyant eggs hatch into planktonic larvae that develop and disperse in the ocean for weeks to months before transitioning into juveniles and eventually finding suitable adult habitat. The pelagic larval stage connects populations and serves as a source of new adults. Oceanic processes affecting the fate of larvae have profound impacts on population replenishment, connectivity, and ecosystem structure. Although it is an important life stage, there is, as of 2021, limited knowledge of the ecology and behaviour of larvae. Understanding the biophysical interactions that govern larval fish survival and transport is essential for predicting and managing marine ecosystems, as well as the fisheries they support.

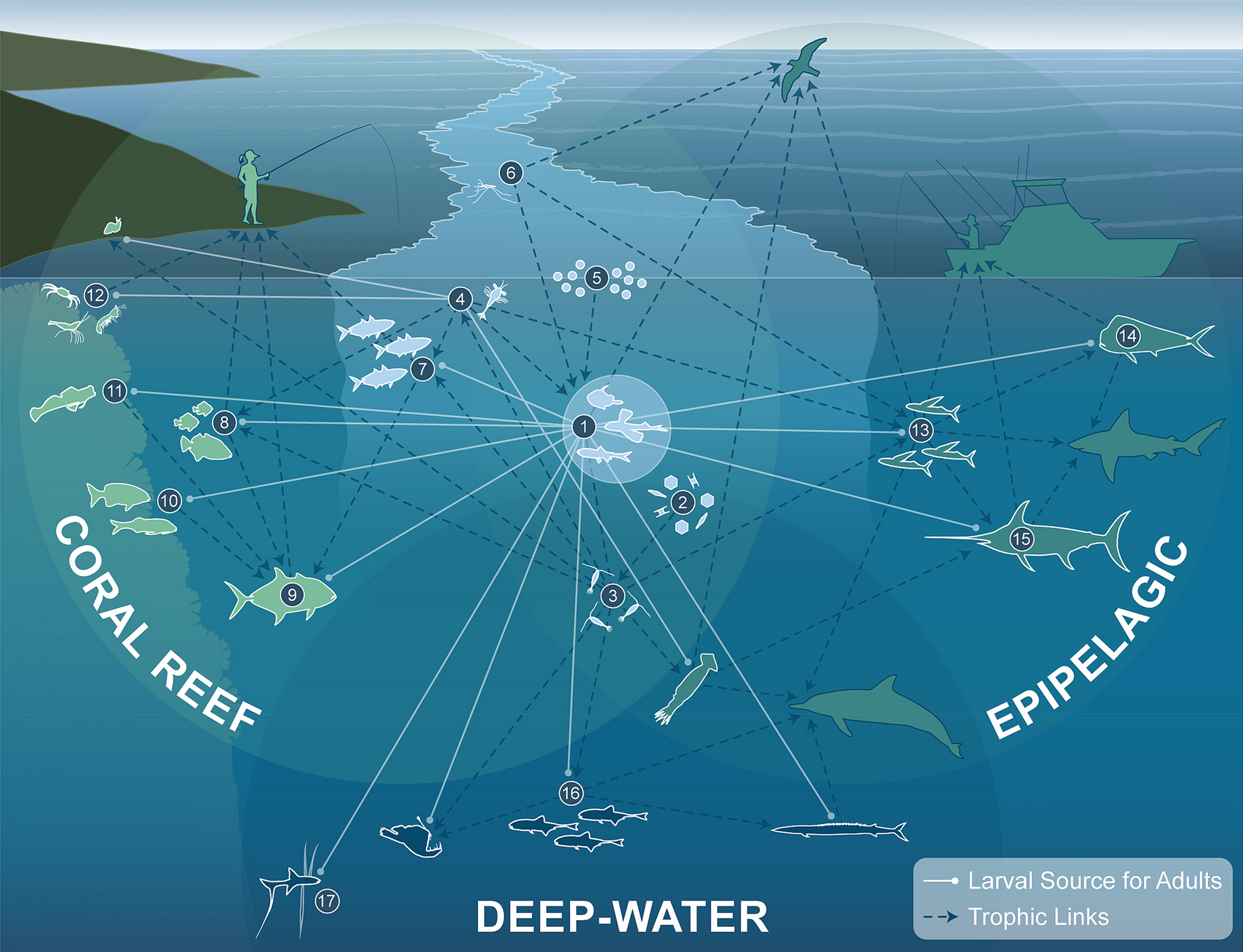
Ecological connections and functions enhanced by surface slick nurseries

The diagram shows: (1) Larval and juvenile stages of fishes from many ocean habitats aggregate in slicks in order to capitalize on dense concentrations of prey (2, phytoplankton, 3, zooplankton, 4, larval invertebrates, 5, eggs, and 6, insects). The increased predator–prey overlap in slicks increases energy flow that propagates up the food-web (dotted blue lines show trophic links), enhancing energy available to higher trophic level predators (icons outlined in blue) including humans. More than 100 species of fishes develop and grow in surface slick nurseries before transitioning to adults (solid white lines radiating outward) in Coral Reefs (7–12), Epipelagic (13–15), and Deep-water (16–17) ocean habitats. As adults these taxa (icons outlined in white) play important ecological functions and provide fisheries resources to local human populations. For example, coastal schooling fishes (7, mackerel scad) are important food and bait fish for humans. Planktivorous fish (8, some damselfishes and triggerfishes) transfer energy from zooplankton up to reef predators like jacks (9), which provide top-down control of reefs and are important targets for shoreline recreational fisherfolk. Grazers (10, chubs) help keep coral reefs from being overgrown by macroalgae. Cryptobenthic fishes such as blennies (11) and benthic macrocrustaceans (12, shrimp, stomatopods, crabs) comprise most of the consumed biomass on reefs. In the pelagic ocean, flyingfishes (13) channel energy and nutrients from zooplankton to pelagic predators such as mahi-mahi (14) and billfish (15), both of which utilize slicks as nursery habitat. Larvae of mesopelagic fishes like lanternfish (16) and bathydemersal tripod fishes (17) utilize these surface hotspots before descending to deep-water adult habitat.

The distribution of prey and predators in the ocean is patchy. Larval survival depends on prey availability, predation, and transport to suitable habitat, all of which are influenced by ocean conditions. Ocean processes that drive convergent flow such as fronts, internal waves, and eddies, can structure plankton, enhance overlap of predators and prey, and influence larval dispersal. Convergent features can also lead to a cascade of effects that ultimately drive food web structure and increase ecosystem productivity.

== Life history ==
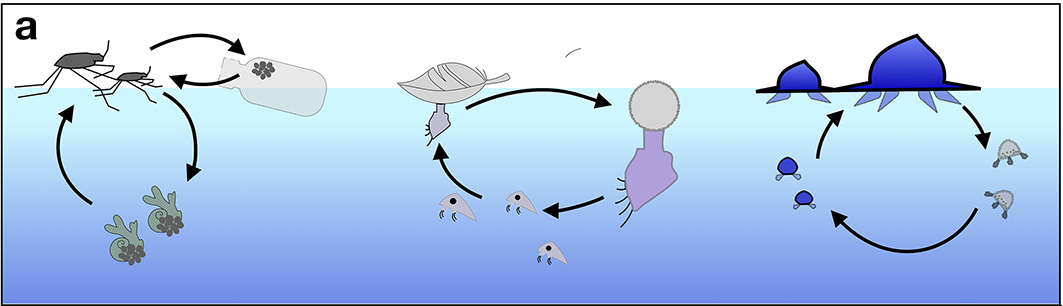
(a) Life history involving eggs (a) Some neustonic species lay eggs on floating objects and sometimes pelagic organisms (e.g., Halobates spp.), while others require surface floating objects for early life cycle stages (e.g., Dosima fascicularis), still others may remain at or near the surface throughout a life cycle due to a dependence on endosymbiotic photosynthetic zooxanthellae (a hypothesis proposed for Velella).

Life histories connect disparate ecosystems; species that live at the surface during one life history stage may occupy the deep sea, benthos, reefs, or freshwater ecosystems during another. A diversity of fish species utilize the ocean's surface, either as adults or as nursery habitat for eggs and young. In contrast, species floating on the ocean's surface during one life cycle stage often (though not always) have pelagic larval stages. Velella and Porpita release jellyfish (medusae), and while little is known about Porpita medusae, Velella medusae could possibly sink into deeper water, or remain near the surface, where they derive nutrients from zooxanthellae. Janthina have pelagic veliger larvae, and Physalia may release reproductive clusters that drift in the water column. Halobates lay eggs on a variety of objects, including floating objects and pelagic snail shells.

All species with pelagic stages must eventually find their way back to the surface. For Velella and Porpita, larvae generated by sexual reproduction of medusae develop small floats, which carry them to the surface. For the larvae of Janthina, the transition to surface life includes the degradation of their eyes and vestibule system, and at the same time, the production of an external structure, which has been reported as either a small parachute made of mucus, or a cluster of bubbles, which they ride to the surface. Young Halobates may hatch either above or below the surface, and for those below, the surface tension proves a formidable barrier. It may take Halobates nymphs several hours to break through the surface film. Despite the challenges of reaching the surface, there may be benefits to a temporary pelagic life.

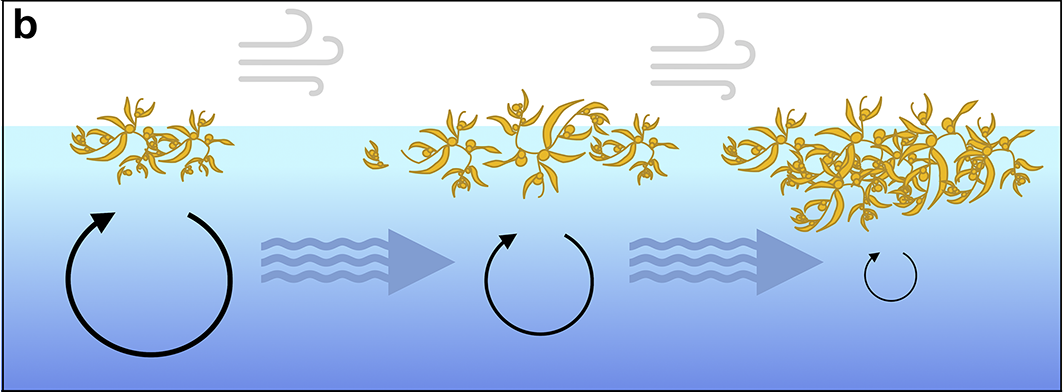
(b) Life history involving wind and currents (b) Neustonic organisms like Sargassum may proliferate in one region (large circle) and be transported by wind and/or currents to high-density regions of low proliferation (small circles).

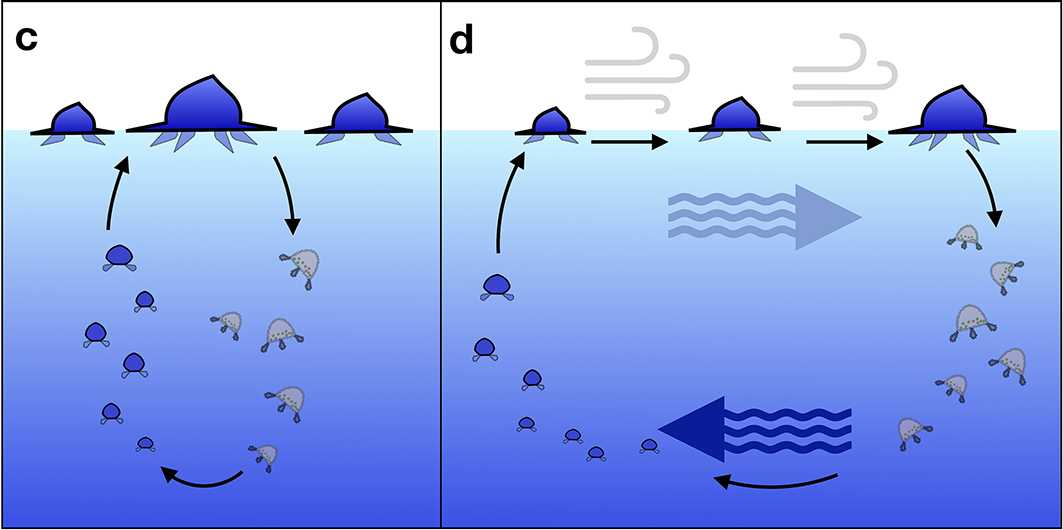
(c) Life history involving deep water (c) Neuston may also occupy deep water for one part of their life history (a hypothesis proposed for Velella) (d) these deep-water habitats may allow them to take advantage of counter currents for transport in the direction opposite surface currents (a hypothesis proposed for Velella)

Connectivity of ocean surface ecosystems may be facilitated by the life history of species living there. One hypothesis is that species have pelagic stages to "escape" surface sink regions and repopulate surface source regions, where one life cycle stage drifts on surface currents in one direction, and a pelagic stage either remains geographically localised or drifts in the opposite direction. However, some surface species, such as the endemic species of the Sargasso Sea, may remain geographically isolated throughout their life history. While these hypotheses are intriguing, it is not known if or how life history shapes population/species distribution for most neustonic species. Understanding how life history varies by species is a critical component of assessing both connectivity and conservation of neustonic ecosystems.

== Sea spray ==
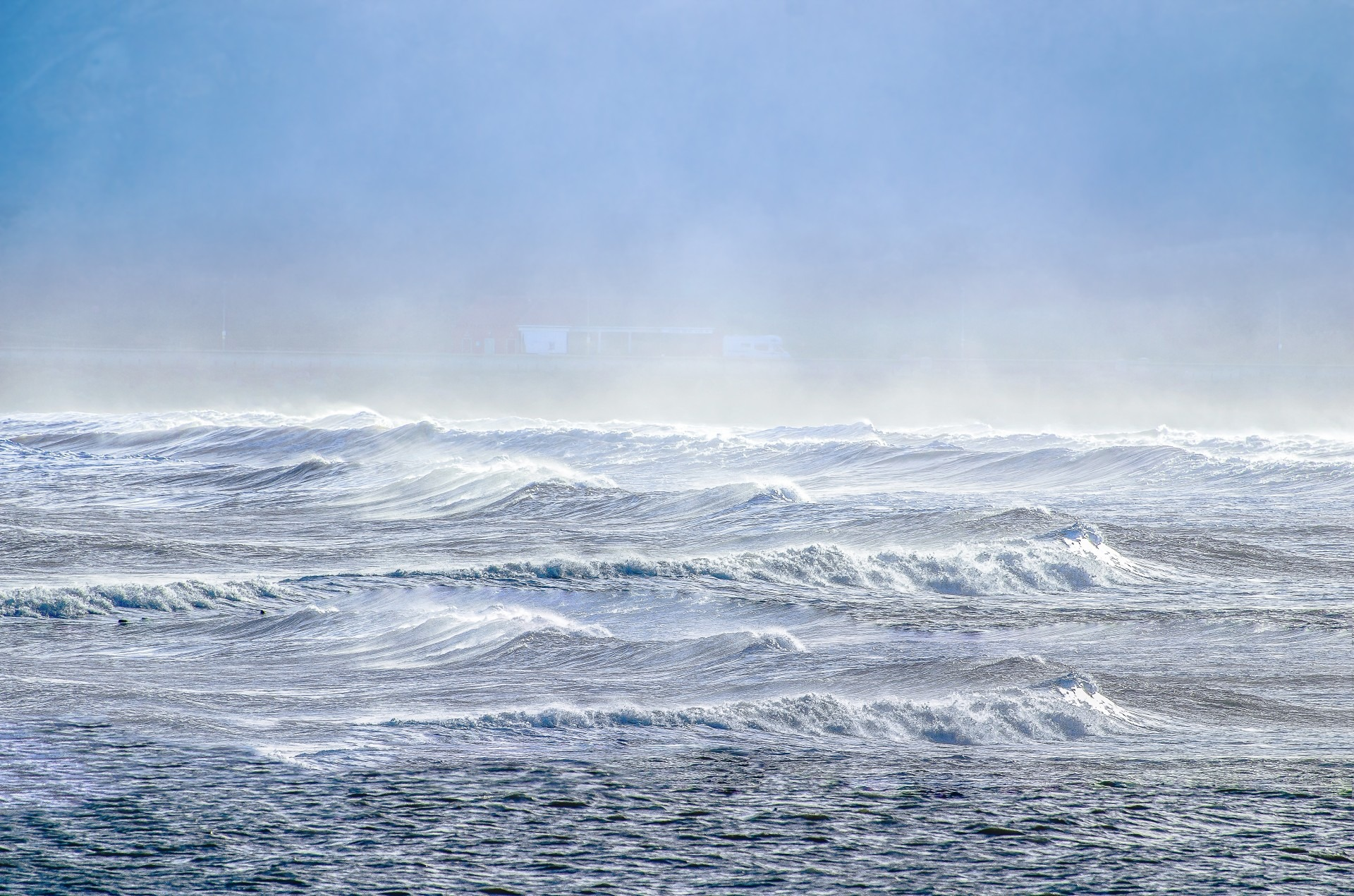
Sea spray containing marine microorganisms can be swept high into the atmosphere and may travel the globe before falling back to earth.

A stream of airborne microorganisms circles the planet above weather systems but below commercial air lanes. Some peripatetic microorganisms are swept up from terrestrial dust storms, but most originate from marine microorganisms in sea spray. In 2018, scientists reported that hundreds of millions of viruses and tens of millions of bacteria are deposited daily on every square meter around the planet.

These airborne microorganisms form part of the aeroplankton. The aeroplankton are tiny lifeforms that float and drift in the air, carried by the current of the wind; they are the atmospheric analogue to oceanic plankton. Most of the living things that make up aeroplankton are very small to microscopic in size, and many can be difficult to identify because of their tiny size. Scientists collect them for study in traps and sweep nets from aircraft, kites or balloons.

The environmental role of airborne cyanobacteria and microalgae is only partly understood. While present in the air, cyanobacteria and microalgae can contribute to ice nucleation and cloud droplet formation. Cyanobacteria and microalgae can also impact human health. Depending on their size, airborne cyanobacteria and microalgae can be inhaled by humans and settle in different parts of the respiratory system, leading to the formation or intensification of numerous diseases and ailments, e.g., allergies, dermatitis, and rhinitis.

== See also ==
- Marine larval ecology
- Ocean surface topography
- Surface layer
- Sea spray
- Sea air
- Surface Ocean Lower Atmosphere Study
- Joint Global Ocean Flux Study
- Regional Ocean Modeling System
