= John Nye (scientist) =

Scientist

- Born: 26 February 1923
- Died: 8 January 2019 (aged 95)
- Education: King's College, Cambridge
- Spouse: Georgiana Wiebenson (m. 1953)
- Children: 3
- Family: Peter Nye (brother); Joshua Anderson Hague (maternal grandfather)
- Scientific career
- Fields: Physics
- Workplaces: University of Bristol
- Notable students: Heidy Mader

John Frederick Nye (26 February 1923 – 8 January 2019) was a British physicist and glaciologist. He was the first to apply plasticity to understand glacier flow. He was a member of the University of Bristol's physics department for 66 years.

== Early life ==
Nye grew up in Hove, Sussex, the second of three children of Haydn Nye and Jessie Hague, daughter of Joshua Anderson Hague. His father was Catholic and his mother was Anglican, and Nye grew up going to both churches.

Nye attended Hawthornden's School kindergarten opposite his house; Holland House (later Claremont School), also in Hove, for preparatory school; and then boarded at Stowe School in Buckinghamshire for his secondary education. He won a Foundation scholarship to study mathematics and physics at King's College, Cambridge, graduating with a Bachelor of Arts (BA), a Master of Arts (MA), and finally a PhD in 1948.

== Career ==
After completing his PhD, Nye was employed as a demonstrator in Cambridge's Department of Mineralogy and Petrology for three years and then had a year-long post-doctoral research position at Bell Telephone Laboratories in New Jersey. He subsequently returned to England and, in 1953, joined the University of Bristol.

His early work was on the physics of plasticity, spanning ice rheology, ice flow mechanics, laboratory ice flow measurements, glacier surges, meltwater penetration in ice, and response of glaciers and ice sheets to seasonal and climatic changes. Later in his long career, he worked extensively in optics, publishing his last paper on electromagnetic wave polarization only a few days before his death.

He was elected a Fellow of the Royal Society in 1976. He served as president of the International Glaciological Society (1966–9), who awarded him the Seligman Crystal in 1969 for outstanding contributions to glaciology. He was also president of the International Commission of Snow and Ice of the International Association of Hydrological Sciences (1971–5). The Cryosphere Focus Group of the American Geophysical Union hosts a Nye Lecture each year at its fall meeting.

Nye worked into his nineties, even after his formal retirement, and "never lost his intellectual curiosity". When he grew too frail to physically go to the university, he would write papers from home. He was known at Bristol for "his decency and his scientific generosity... His intellectual determination... balanced by his unfailing politeness".

== Personal life ==
In 1953, Nye married Georgiana Wiebenson, whom he had met during his year at Bell Laboratories, in the chapel of King's College Cambridge. They had three children: Hilary Catherine (b. 1957), Stephen Christopher (b. 1960), and Carolyn Lucy (b. 1963). Nye renovated a rundown house in Bristol into their family home. On the side, he was an avid gardener, and left the garden open as part of the National Open Garden Scheme. He also enjoyed snorkeling, painting, poetry, and the Christian choral tradition.

Nye died on 8 January 2019 at age 95 from heart failure.

== Awards and recognition ==
Nye won the Chree medal and prize in 1989. He was Emeritus Professor in Physics at the University of Bristol, UK. In addition to glaciology, his research interests included caustics and microwave probes.

== Books ==
- J. F. Nye, 1957, Physical Properties of Crystals: Their Representation by Tensors and Matrices. Oxford University Press. ISBN 978-0-19-851165-6
- J. F. Nye, 1999, Natural Focusing and Fine Structure of Light: Caustics and Wave Dislocations. CRC Press. ISBN 978-0-7503-0610-2

== Scientific publications ==
- 1951, The flow of glaciers and ice-sheets as a problem in plasticity. Proceedings of the Royal Society of London Series A-Mathematical And Physical Sciences, 207(1091),554-572.
- 1952, The mechanics of glacier flow. J. Glaciol. 2 (1952), pp. 82–93
- 1953, The flow law of ice from measurements in glacier tunnels, laboratory experiments and the Jungfraufirn Borehole Experiment. Proceedings of the Royal Society of London Series A-Mathematical And Physical Sciences, 219(1139), 477–489.
- 1958, Surges in Glaciers, Nature 181, 1450–1451
- 1959. The motion of ice sheets and glaciers. J. Glaciol., 3(26), 493–507.

== See also ==
- Nye Glacier
- Nye notation
- N-channel
- Ice-sheet dynamics
- Bubble raft
