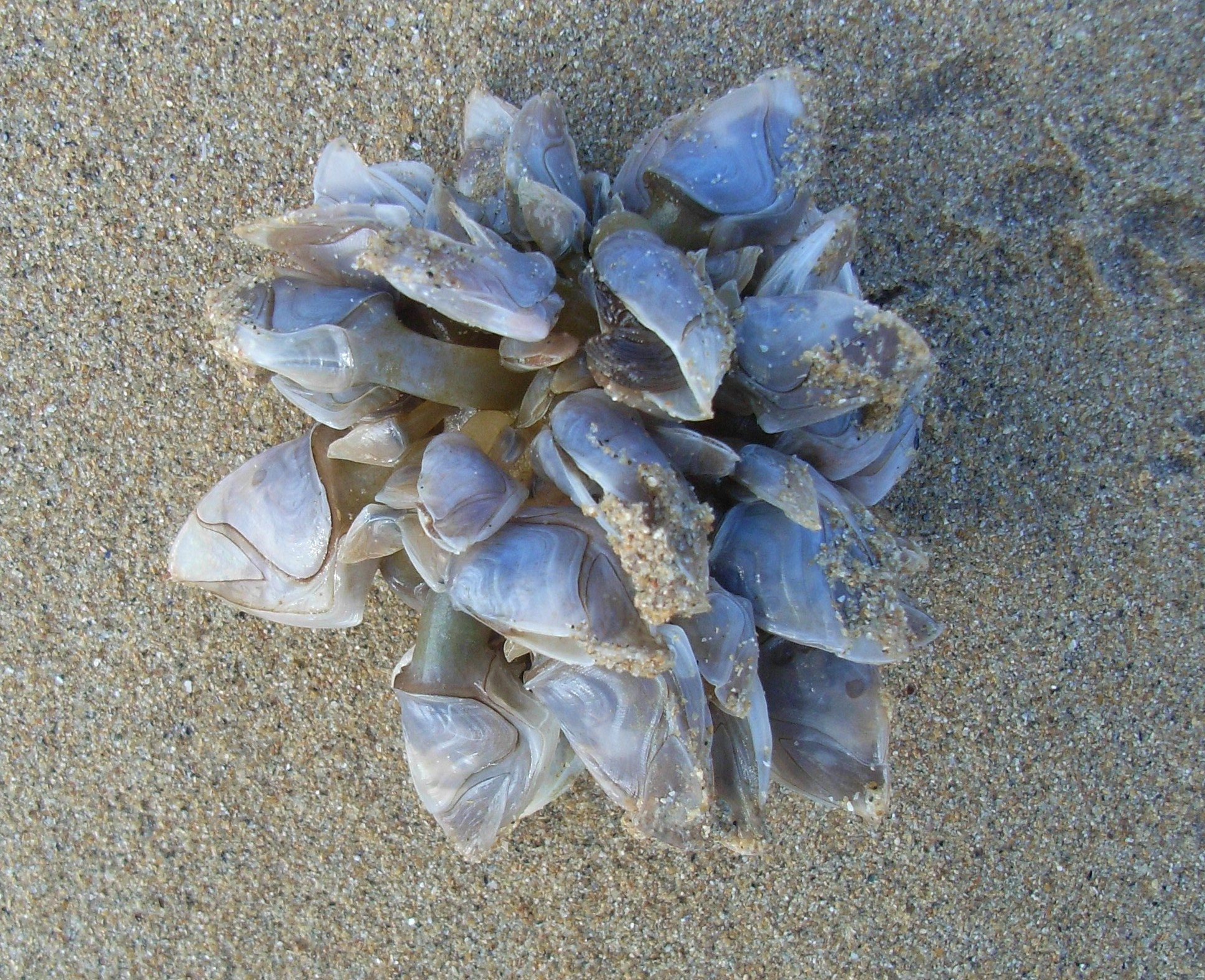

Scientific classification
- Kingdom: Animalia
- Phylum: Arthropoda
- Class: Thecostraca
- Subclass: Cirripedia
- Order: Scalpellomorpha
- Family: Lepadidae
- Genus: Dosima
- Species: D. fascicularis

Binomial name
- Dosima fascicularis (Ellis & Solander, 1786)

Synonyms
- List: Lepas fascicularis Ellis & Solander, 1786; Lepas cygnea Spengler, 1790; Lepas dilata Donovan, 1804; Pentalasmis spirulicola Leach, 1818; Pentalasmis donovani Leach, 1818; Anatiffia vitrea Lamarck, Coates, 1829; Lepas fasciculata Montagu, Coates, 1829; Pentalepas vitrea Lesson, 1830; Anatifa oceanica Quoy & Gaimard in Dumont d'Urville, 1832-1835

= Dosima fascicularis =

Species of barnacles

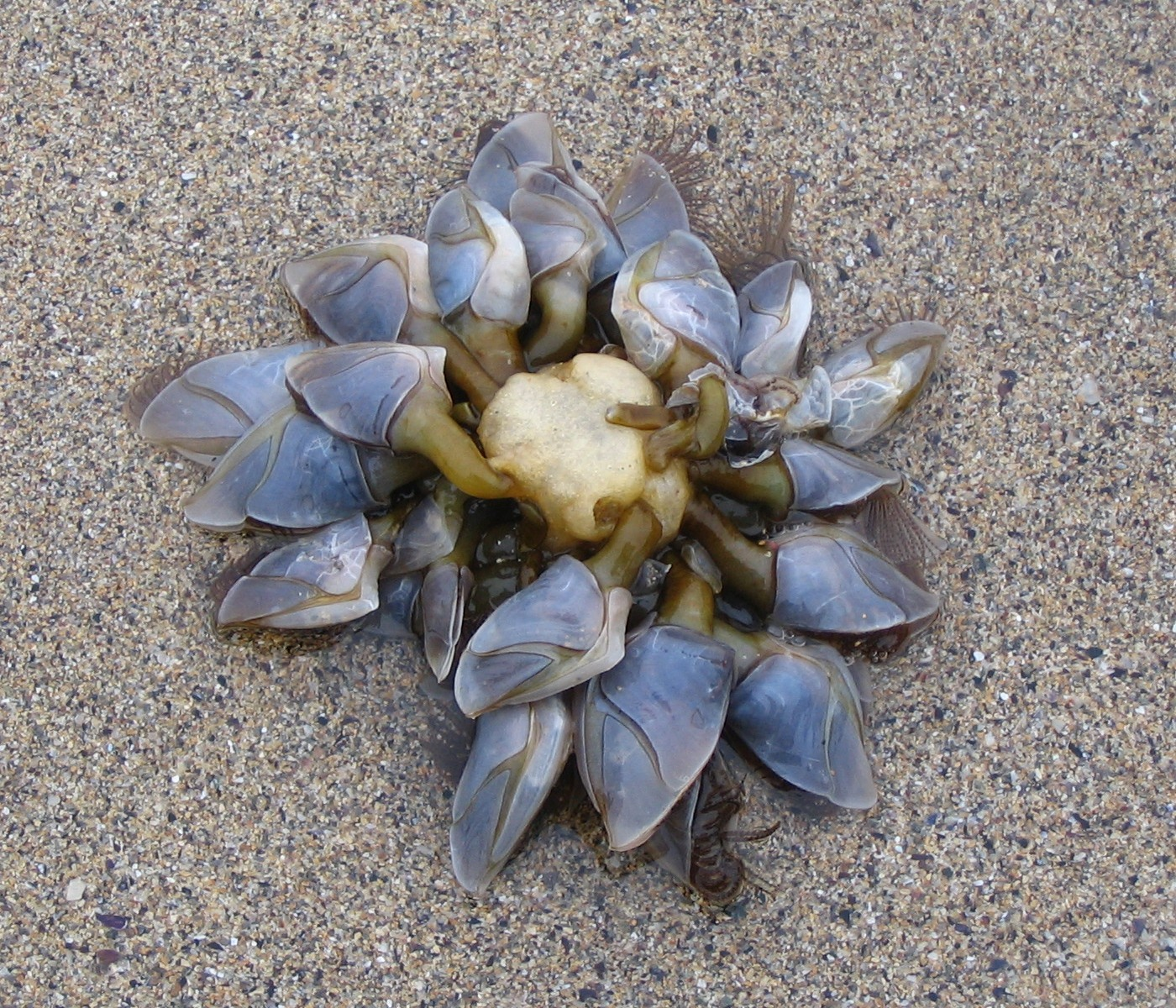
Group of buoy barnacles attached to a float they constructed themselves

The buoy barnacle (Dosima fascicularis) is a species of goose barnacle known for its unique characteristic of hanging downwards from a buoyant appendage which drifts at the water surface and is carried along by ocean currents. It is regarded as "the most specialized pleustonic goose barnacle" as most other barnacle species are sessile filter feeders that remain fixed onto other firm surfaces. Formerly placed in the genus Lepas, the buoy barnacle is now generally placed in the genus Dosima, which is distinguished from Lepas by the form of the carina, and by the exceptional thinness and brittleness of its exoskeleton.

== Flotation ==
As an adult, D. fascicularis lives attached to a float made either of natural flotsam or of a cement it secretes itself, which has a texture like that of expanded polystyrene foam. It is the only barnacle to produce its own gas-filled float. The cyprid larvae are planktonic, and must attach to a float for metamorphosis into the adult form, but the adults are eventually capable of using their own float, sometimes forming aggregations of many individuals attached to a single float. Among the floats used by adult buoy barnacles are pellets of tar, seaweeds, plastic debris, driftwood, feathers, cranberries, cuttlefish bone, the "by-the-wind-sailor" Velella velella, seagrass leaves, Styrofoam, seeds, and even apples; they have even been known to colonise the backs of turtles and the sea snake Pelamis platurus. It is a fugitive species, which can be out-competed by other barnacle species, and relies on being able to colonise surfaces and reproduce quickly; after settling on a float, D. fascicularis can reproduce within 45 days. D. fascicularis appears to be increasing in abundance as a result of anthropogenic marine debris accumulating in the sea; this source of floats was of "minor importance" in 1974.

== Distribution ==
D. fascicularis has a cosmopolitan distribution, with a preference for temperate seas, having been found at latitudes from 71° North off Siberia to 57° South near Cape Horn. Groups have been observed journeying from Japan to the Hawaiian Islands in the Pacific Ocean, and sometimes wash up on westerly and southerly beaches in the British Isles, as well as westerly beaches further south in Europe. It is not normally found in the Mediterranean Sea, but may have begun to colonise there from the Atlantic Ocean.
