= Heidy Mader =

British physicist (1961–2022)

Heidy Marita Mader
- Born: 1961; RAF Cosford, Shropshire, England
- Died: 22 December 2022 (aged 61)
- Education: University of York; University of Bristol
- Alma mater: University of York (BSc 1985) University of Bristol (PhD 1991)
- Scientific career
- Fields: Volcanology, Glaciology
- Workplaces: University of Bristol
- Thesis: Water veins in polycrystalline ice (1992)
- Doctoral advisor: John Nye

Heidy M. Mader (1961 – 22 December 2022) was a British physicist and professor at the University of Bristol who specialised in the study of the flow of complex multiphase fluids, including magma in volcanic systems and ice. She was the editor-in-chief of the Journal of Volcanology and Geothermal Research from 2016-2021.

== Early life ==
Heidy Mader was born at RAF Cosford to Eric and Renate (née Pitz) Mader. Her father was an officer in the RAF, while her mother, who originally came from Germany, was a teacher.

For her secondary schooling, the family moved to Germany, where Mader became fluent in German and developed a passion for physics. She was the only girl in her year to take the subject at Abitur level.

Mader earned her bachelor of science in physics from the University of York in 1985. She earned her doctor of philosophy degree in physics from the University of Bristol in 1991. Her dissertation was titled Water veins in polycrystalline ice.

== Career ==
Mader began her career as a research physicist in the Technical Development Department at Cadbury-Schweppes from 1985 to 1987. During her time there, she studied the flow of chocolate, including Wispa, an aerated chocolate bar. From 1990–1992, she was employed as BP Venture Research Fellow in the Department of Earth Sciences, University of Bristol. In 1992, she took up a Lectureship in Environmental Sciences at the University of Lancaster, before returning to Bristol as Lecturer in the Department of Earth Sciences in 1996. She was promoted to Professor in 2013.

== Personal life and death ==
Mader married Jon Keating in 2009 and together they had three children. The eldest, Alex, died soon after birth.

Mader died from cancer on 22 December 2022, at the age of 61.
