= Journal of Volcanology and Geothermal Research =

- Discipline: Volcanology and Geothermal science
- Language: English
- Edited by: Alessandro Aiuppa, James Gardner, José Luis Macías, Heidy Mader, Diana Roman, Kelly Russell

Publication details
- Publisher: Elsevier (Netherlands)
- Frequency: 40/year
- Impact factor: 2.789 (2020)

Standard abbreviations
- ISO 4: J. Volcanol. Geotherm. Res.

Indexing
- ISSN: 0377-0273

Links
- Journal homepage

Journal of Volcanology and Geothermal Research is a scientific journal that publishes recent research on the fields of volcanology and geothermal activity, as well as the societal and environmental impact of these phenomenon.

== Abstracting and indexing ==
This journal is abstracted and indexed by the following services:

- Chemical Abstracts
- Current Contents
- Engineering Index
- GEOBASE
- Mineralogical Abstracts
- Scopus
- GeoRef
- Science Citation Index
- Referativnyi Zhurnal

== See also ==
- List of geology journals
- List of scientific journals
- List of scientific journals in earth and atmospheric sciences
