= Neuston =

Organisms that live at the surface of a body of water

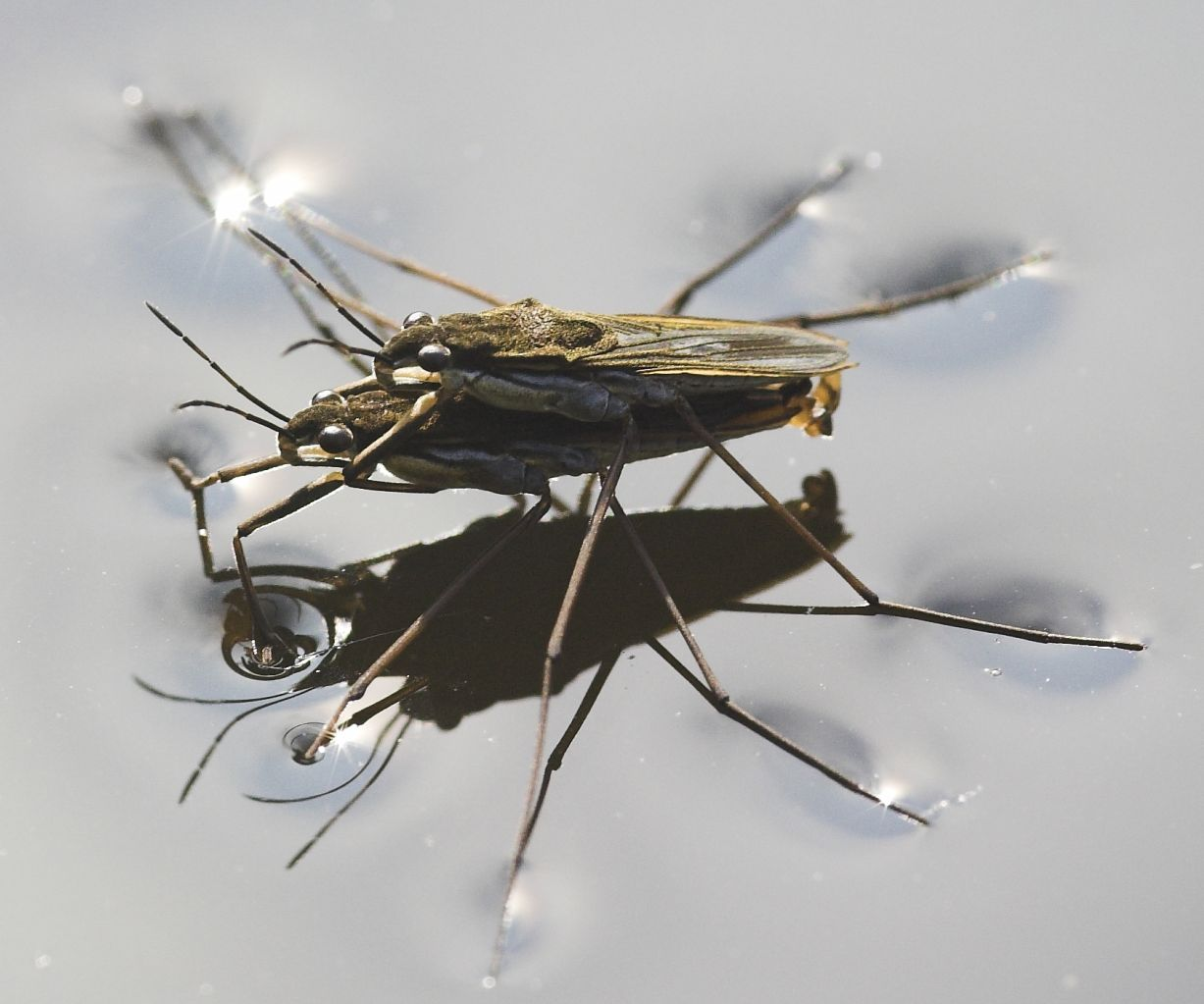
A pair of Gerris sp., freshwater neustons

Neuston, also called pleuston, are organisms that live at the surface of a body of water, such as an ocean, estuary, lake, river, wetland or pond. Neuston can live on top of the water surface or submersed just below the water surface. In addition, microorganisms can exist in the surface microlayer that forms between the top- and the under-side of the water surface. Neuston has been defined as "organisms living at the air/water interface of freshwater, estuarine, and marine habitats or referring to the biota on or directly below the water's surface layer."

Neustons can be informally separated into two groups: the phytoneuston, which are autotrophs floating at the water surface including cyanobacteria, filamentous algae and free-floating aquatic plant (e.g. mosquito fern, duckweed and water lettuce); and the zooneuston, which are floating heterotrophs such as protists (e.g. ciliates) and metazoans (aquatic animals). The word "neuston" represents the nominalized neuter of the Greek neustos meaning "swimming"; compare also "plankton". This term first appears in the biological literature in 1917. The alternative term pleuston comes from the Greek plein, meaning "to sail or float". The first known use of this word was in 1909, before the first known use of neuston. In the past various authors have attempted distinctions between neuston and pleuston, but these distinctions have not been widely adopted. As of 2021, the two terms are usually used somewhat interchangeably, and neuston is used more often than pleuston.

== Overview ==
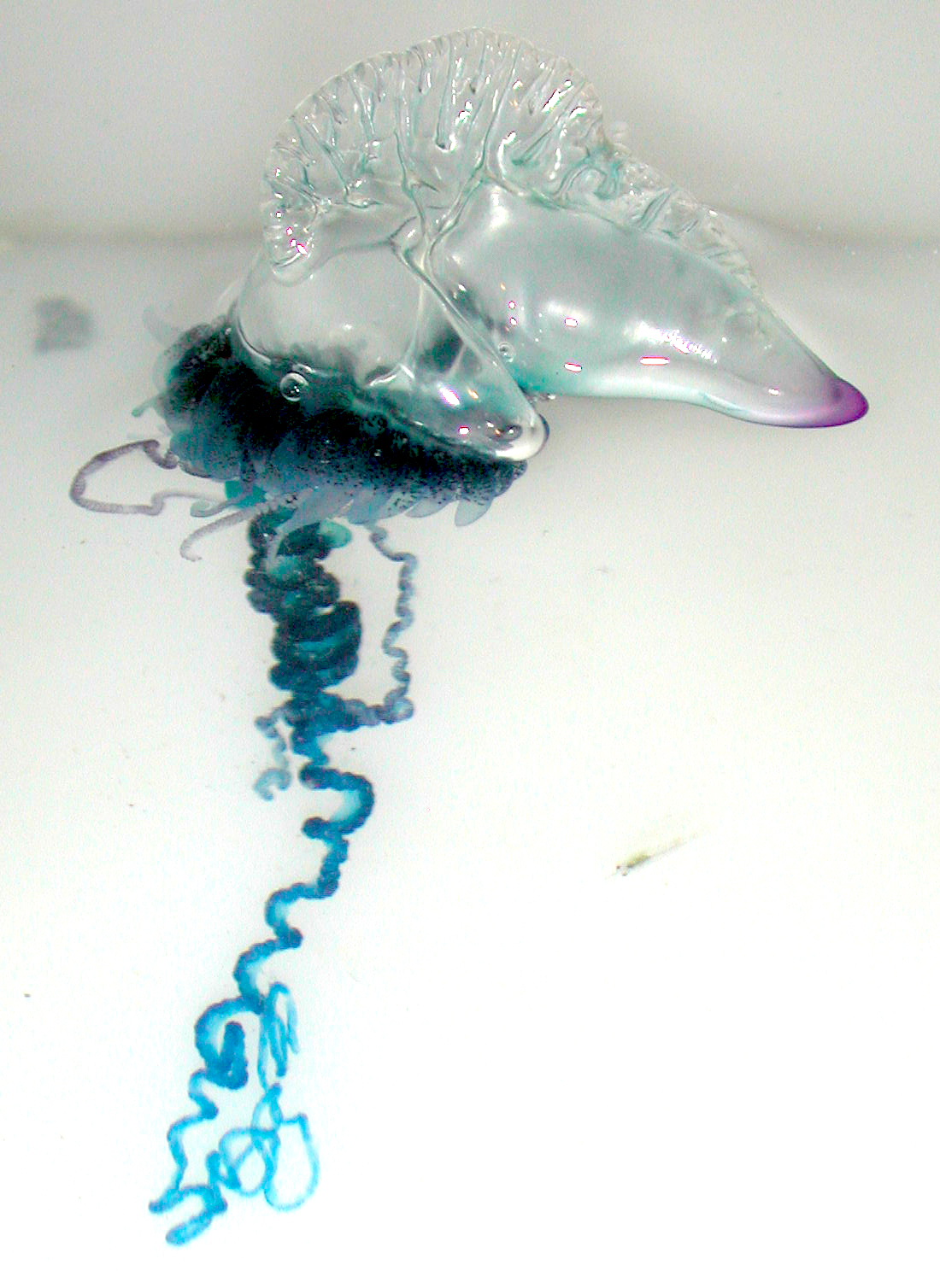
Portuguese man o' war, a marine pleuston

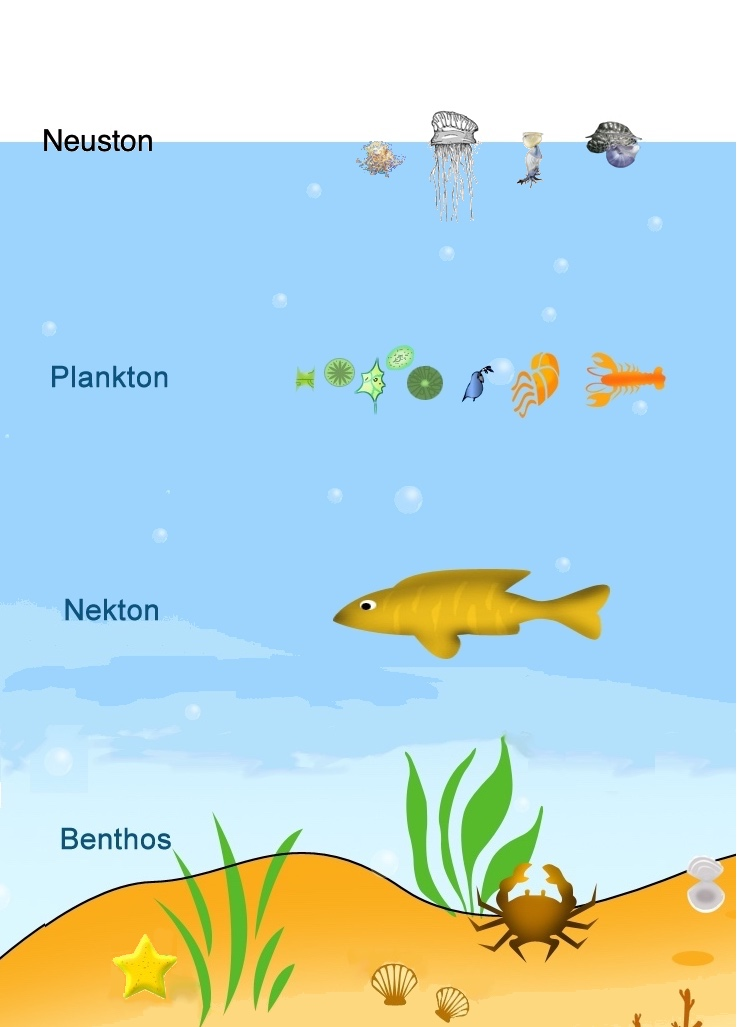
Marine neuston (organisms that live at the ocean surface) can be contrasted with plankton, organisms that drift with water currents; nekton that can swim against water currents; and benthos that live at the ocean floor.

The neuston of the surface layer is one of the lesser known aquatic ecological groups. The term was first used in 1917 by Naumann to describe species associated with the surface layer of freshwater habitats. Later in 1971, Zaitsev identified neuston composition in marine waters. These populations would include microscopic species, plus various plant and animal taxa, such as phytoplankton and zooplankton, living in this region. In 2002, Gladyshev further characterised the major physical and chemical dynamics of the surface layer influencing the composition and relationships with various neustonic populations"

The neustonic community structure is conditioned by sunlight and an array of endogenous (organic matter, respiratory, photosynthetic, decompositional processes) and exogenous (atmospheric deposition, inorganic matter, winds, wave action, precipitation, UV radiation, oceanic currents, surface temperature) variables and processes affecting nutrient inputs and recycling. Furthermore, the neuston provides a food source to the zooplankton migrating from deeper layers to the surface, as well as to seabirds roaming over the oceans. For these reasons, the neustonic community is believed to play a critical role on the structure and function of marine food webs. Yet, research on neuston communities to date focused predominantly on geographically limited regions of the ocean or coastal areas. Consequently, neuston complexity is still poorly understood as studies on the community structure and the taxonomical composition of organisms inhabiting this ecological niche remain few, and global scale analyses are yet lacking.

== Types ==
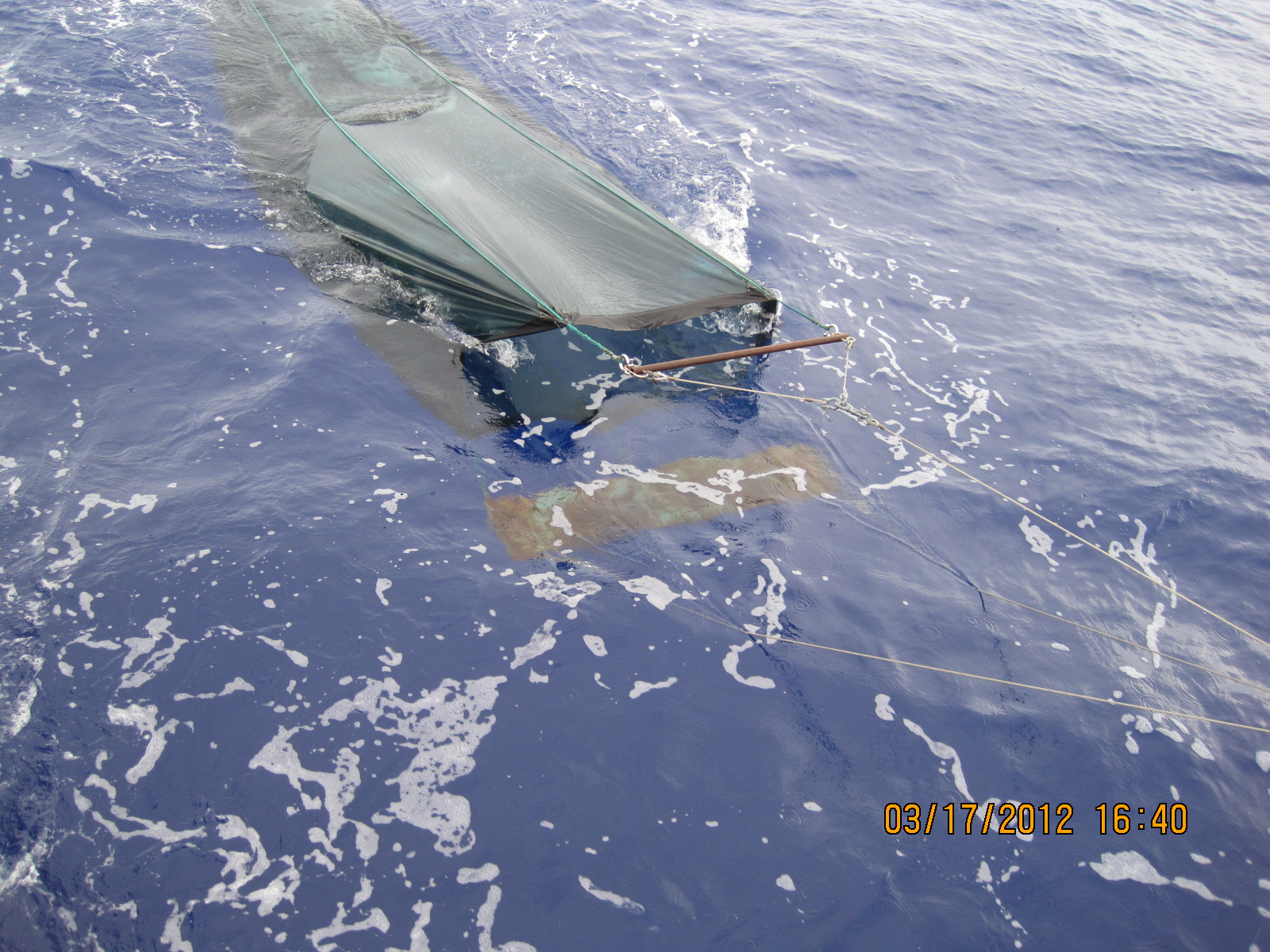
Neuston tow net, used for collecting surface specimens

There are different ways neuston can be categorised. Kennish divides them by their physical position into two groups:

- epineuston: organisms living on the water's surface
- hyponeuston: organisms within a region of specified depth directly below the surface layer

To this can be added the organisms living in the microlayer at the interface between air and water:

- microlayer neuston: organisms (microorganisms) living in the surface microlayer sandwiched between the upper and under surface.

Rapoport and Sánchez further split epineuston into two categories:

- transitory, accidental or rain epineuston, which may survive on the water after being washed there by flooding but prefer land
- permanent, or epineuston proper: adapted and specialized to life on the water, preferring the surface of the water over soil

Marshall and Burchardt divide neuston into three ecological categories:

- euneuston: organisms with maximum abundance in the vicinity of the surface on which they reside day and night
- facultative neuston: organisms concentrating at the surface only during certain hours of the day, usually during darkness
- pseudoneuston: organisms with maximum concentrations at deeper layers but reaching the surface layer at least during certain hours.

== Freshwater neuston ==
Freshwater neuston, organisms living at lake or pond surfaces or slow moving parts of rivers and streams, include beetles (see whirligig beetle), protozoans, bacteria and spiders (see fishing spider and diving bell spider). Springtails in the genera Podura and Sminthurides are almost exclusively neustonic, while Hypogastrura species often aggregate on pond surfaces. Water striders such as Gerris are common examples of insects that support their weight on water's surface tension.

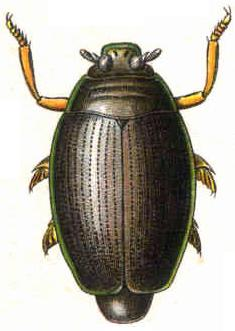
Whirligig beetle (Gyrinus natator)

Water springtail (Sminthurides aquaticus)

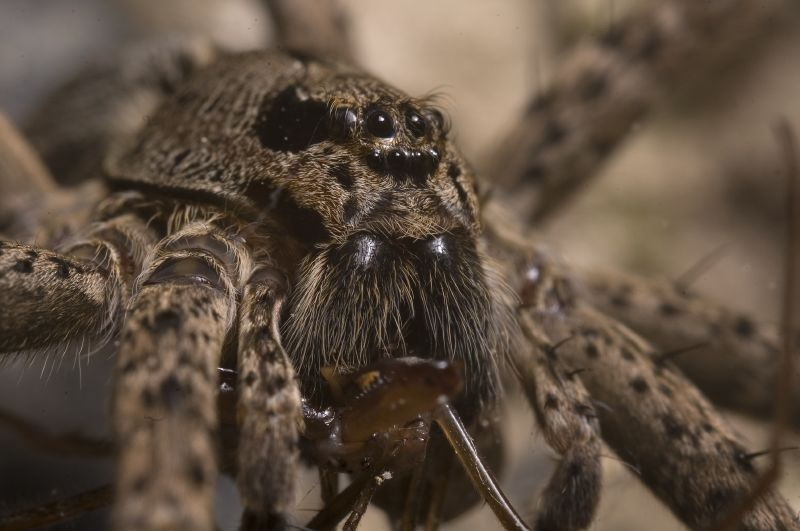
Fishing Spider (Dolomedes Dondalei)

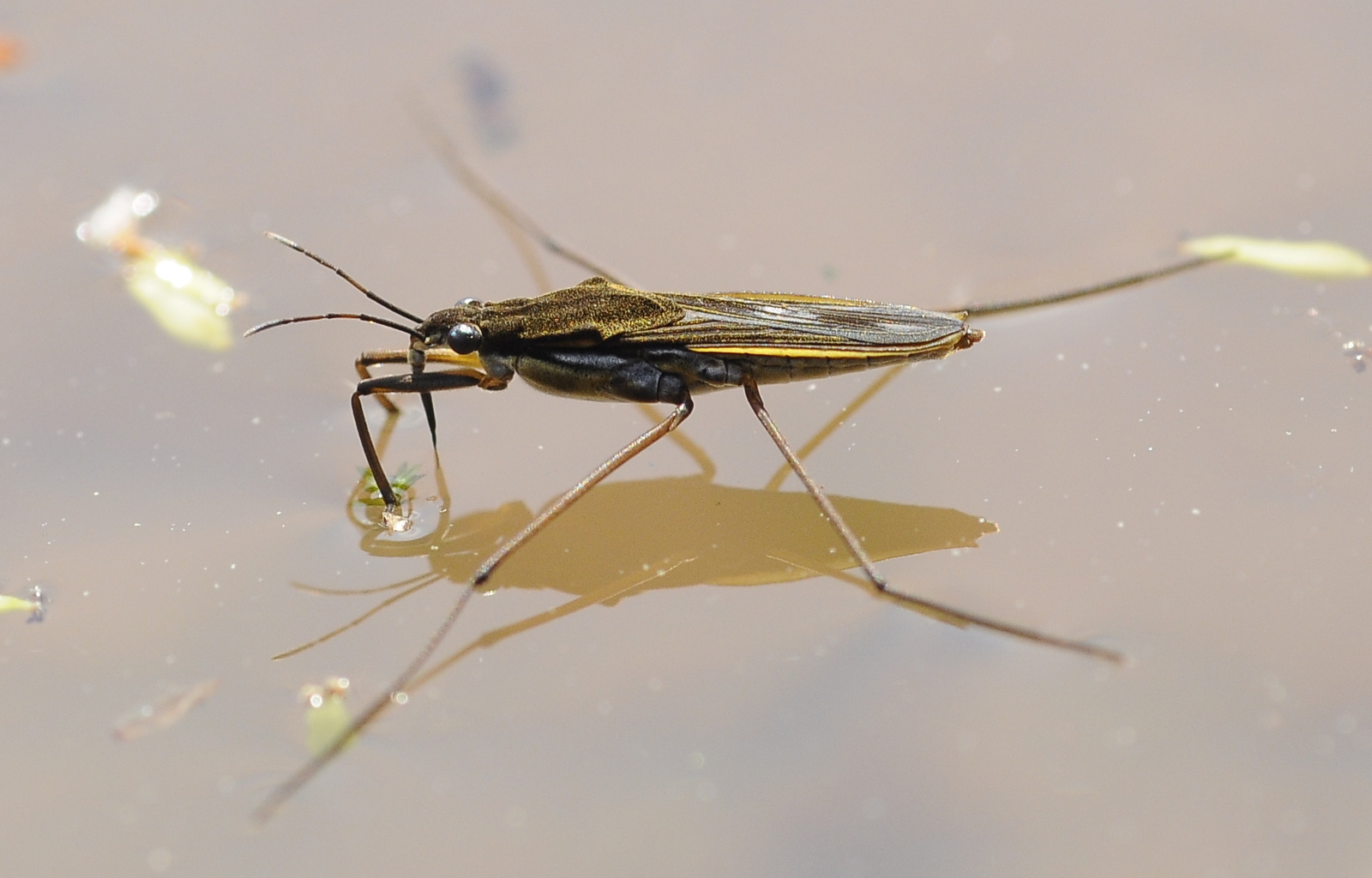
Waterstrider (Gerris commun)

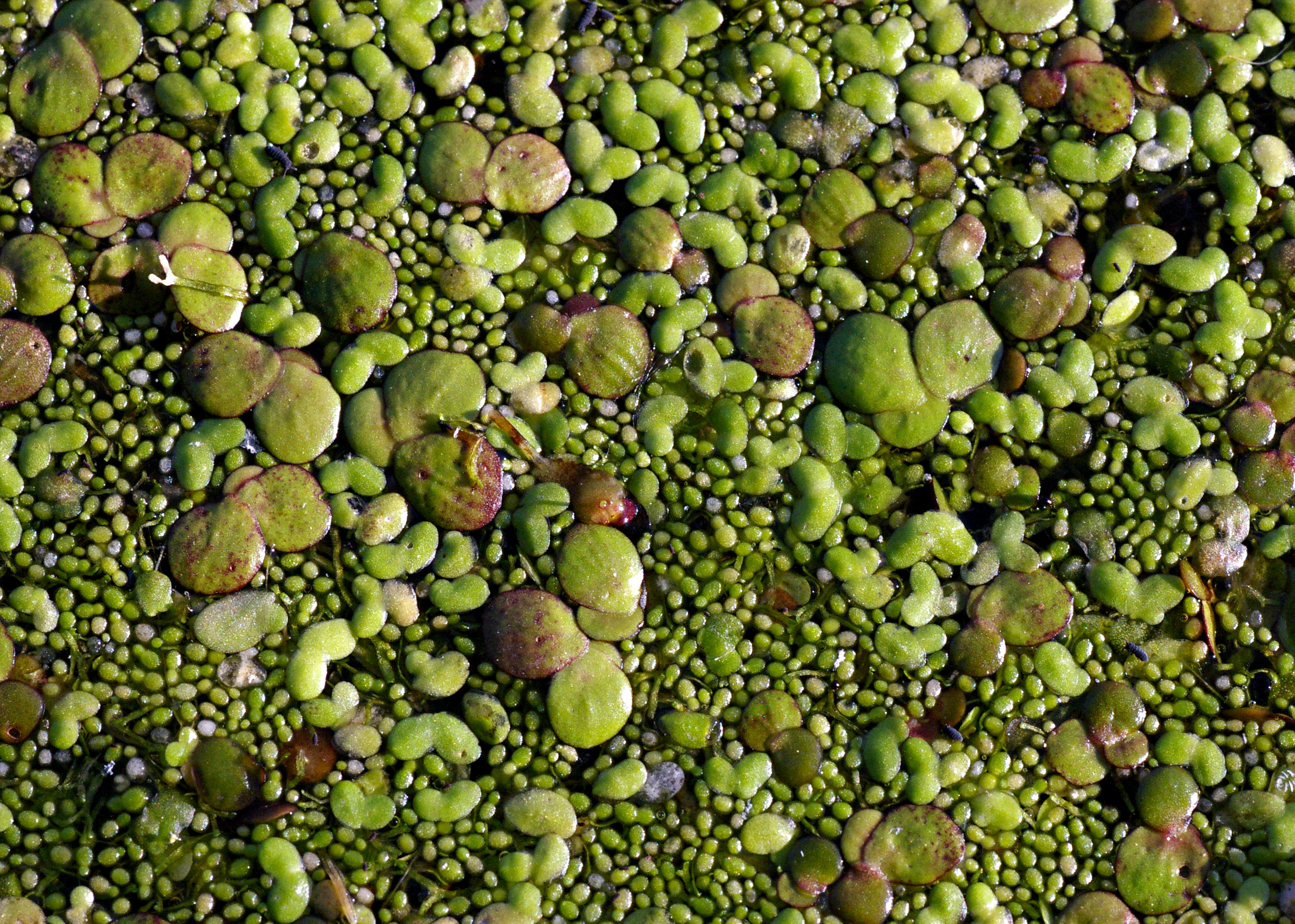
Duckweed on a pond, by size (largest to smallest): greater duckweed, lesser duckweed and rootless dwarf duckweed

=== Floods ===
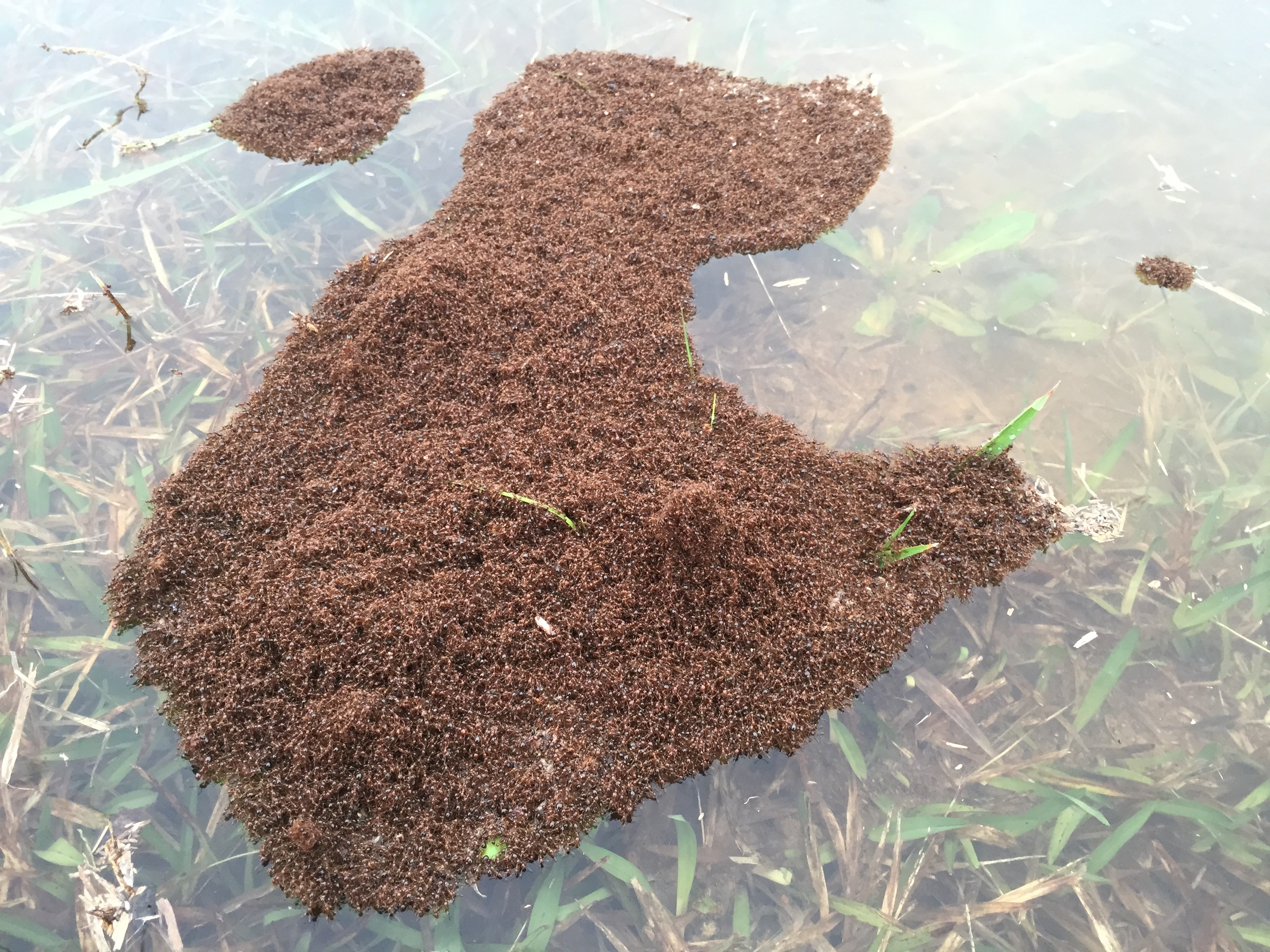
Raft of red fire ants floating over a pond bank submerged by heavy rain

External videos
- Fire Ants Turn Into a Stinging Life Raft to Survive Floods | Deep Look on YouTube

There are different terrestrial environmental factors such as flood pulses and droughts, and these environmental factors affect species such as neuston, whether the effects lead to more or less variations in the species. When flood pulses (an abiotic factor) occur, connectivity between different aquatic environments occur. Species that live in environments with irregular flood patterns tend to have more variations, or even decrease species and variations; similar idea to what happens when droughts occur.

Red fire ants have adapted to contend with both flooding and drought conditions. If the ants sense increased water levels in their nests, they link together and form a ball or raft that floats, with the workers on the outside and the queen inside. The brood is transported to the highest surface. They are also used as the founding structure of the raft, except for the eggs and smaller larvae. Before submerging, the ants will tip themselves into the water and sever connections with the dry land. In some cases, workers may deliberately remove all males from the raft, resulting in the males drowning.

The longevity of a raft can be as long as 12 days. Ants that are trapped underwater escape by lifting themselves to the surface using bubbles which are collected from submerged substrate. Owing to their greater vulnerability to predators, red imported fire ants are significantly more aggressive when rafting. Workers tend to deliver higher doses of venom, which reduces the threat of other animals attacking. Due to this, and because a higher workforce of ants is available, rafts are potentially dangerous to those that encounter them.

== Marine neuston ==
The marine neuston, organisms living at the ocean surface, are one of the least studied planktonic groups. Neuston occupies a restricted ecological niche and is affected by a wide range of endogenous and exogenous processes while also being a food source to zooplankton and fish migrating from the deep layers and seabirds.

Neustonic animals are primarily adapted to float upside-down on the ocean surface, similar to an inverted benthos, and form a unique subset of the zooplankton community, which plays a pivotal role in the functioning of marine ecosystems. Zooplankton are partially responsible for the active energy flux between superficial and deep layers of the ocean. Zooplankton species composition, biomass, and secondary production influence a wide range of trophic levels in marine communities, as they constitute a link between primary production and secondary consumers. Copepods constitute the most abundant zooplankton taxon in terms of biomass and diversity worldwide. Consequently, changes in their community composition can impact the biogeochemical cycles and might be indicative of climate variability impacts on ecosystem functioning.

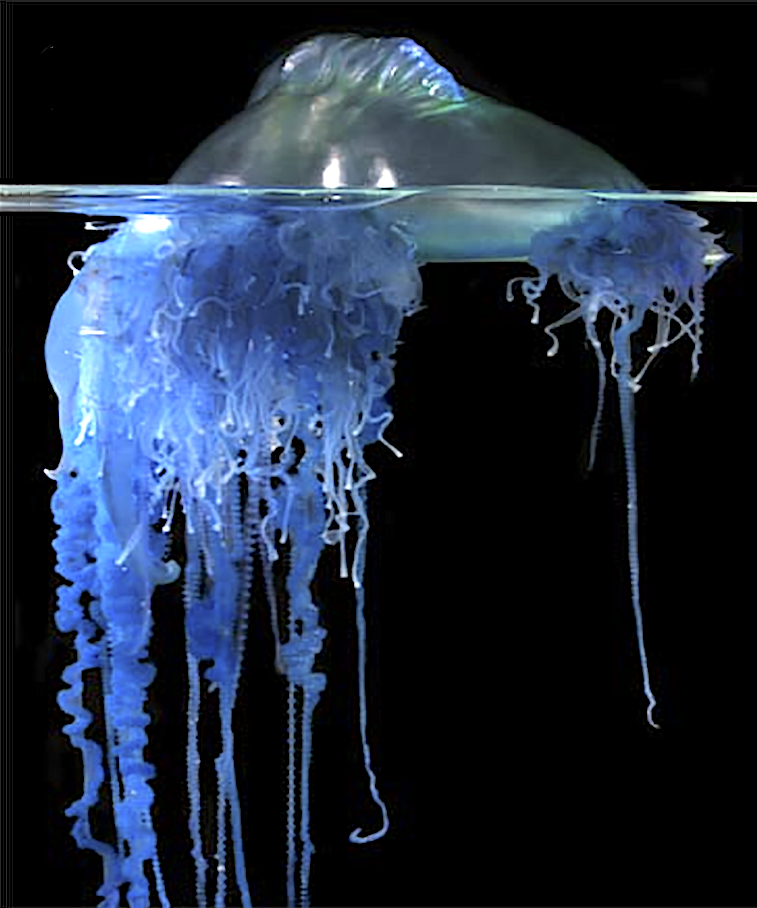
Portuguese man-o-war Physalia sp.

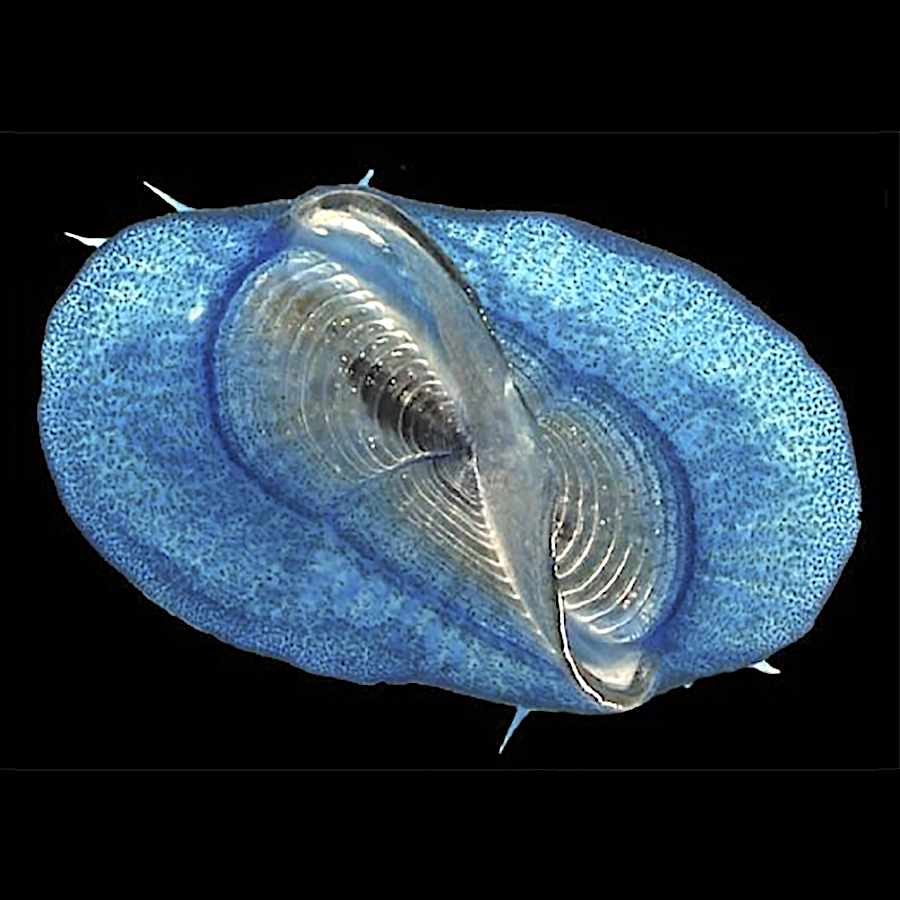
By-the-wind sailor Velella sp.

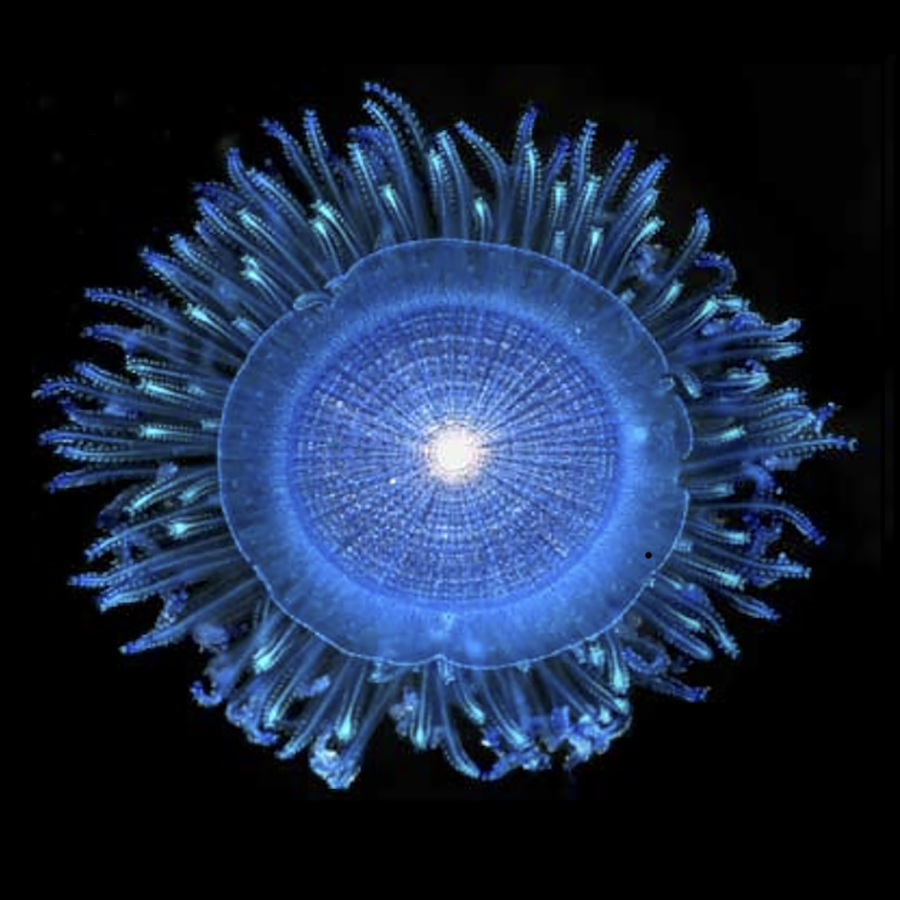
Blue button Porpita sp.

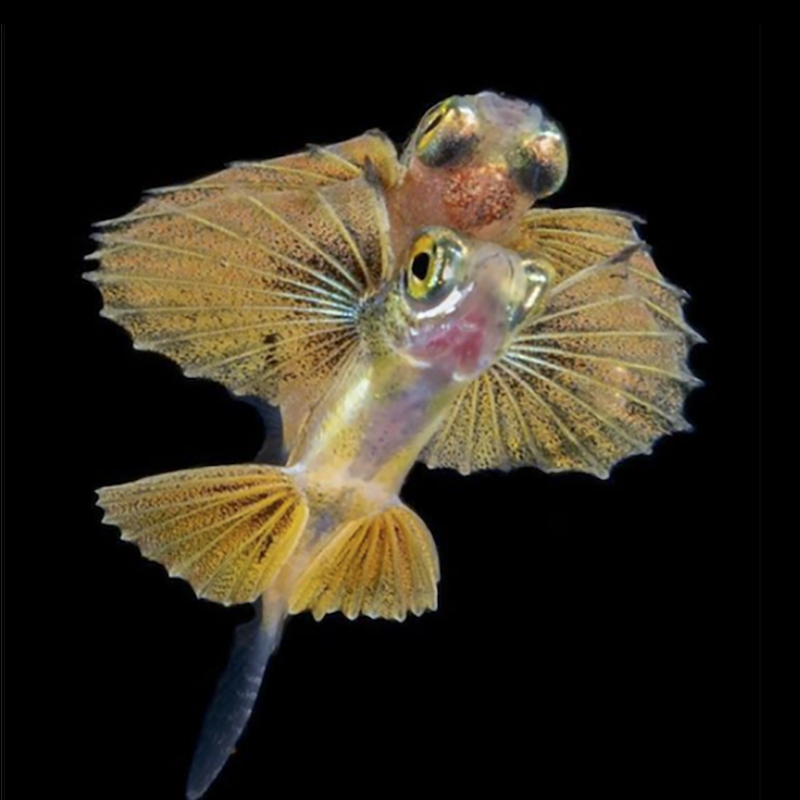
Flying fish from the family Exocoetidae

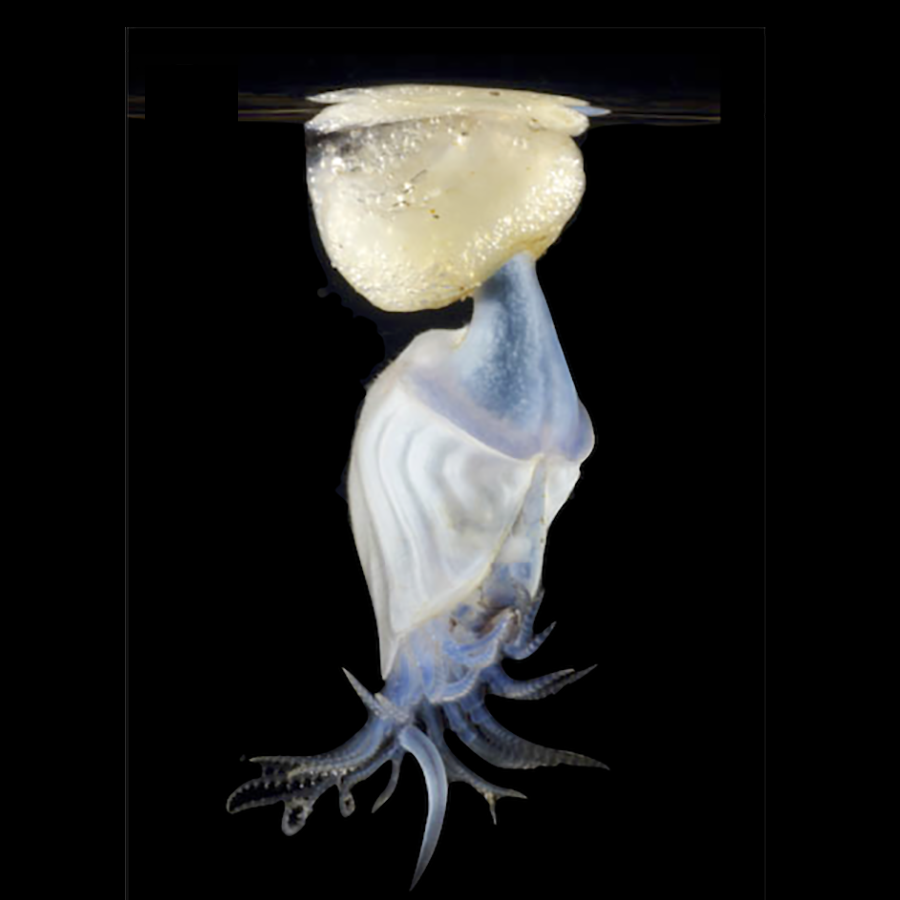
Buoy barnacle Dosima fascicularis

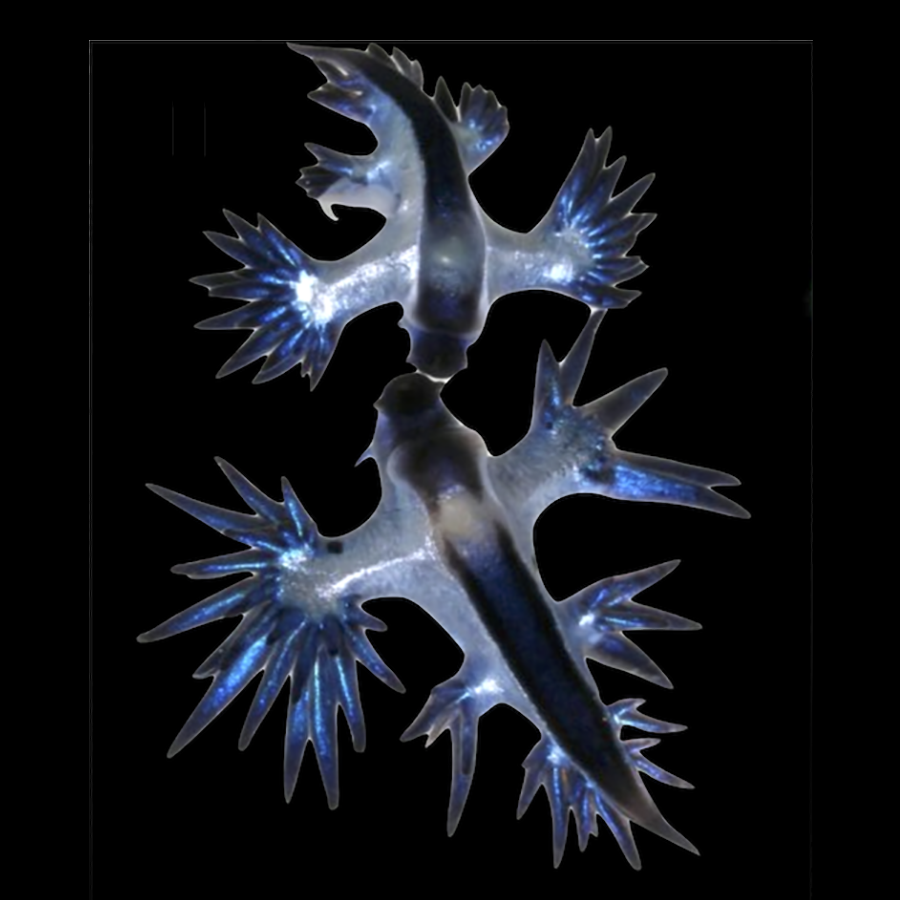
Blue sea dragons Glaucus sp.

Historically, zooplankton assemblages research has focused mainly on taxonomic studies and those related to community structure. However, recently, research has veered toward an alternative trait-based approach, providing a perspective more focused on groups of species with analogous functional traits. This allows individuals to be classified into types characterized by the presence/absence of certain alleles of a gene, into size classes, ecological guilds, or functional groups (FGs). Functional traits are phenotypes affecting organism fitness, growth, survival, and reproductive ability. These are regulated by the expression of genes within species, and the expression of traits regulate, in turn, the species fitness under contrasting biotic and abiotic circumstances. Moreover, a specific functional trait can also develop from the interactions between other traits and environmental conditions, leading to a given trait grouping being favoured under certain conditions. Zooplankton traits can be classified in accordance to ecological functions – feeding, growth, reproduction, survival, and other characteristics such as morphology, physiology, behaviour, or life history. Particularly, feeding strategies and trophic groups are relevant to establish feeding efficiency and associated predation risk. Additionally, they facilitate the understanding of ecosystem services associated with zooplankton, such as the distribution of fisheries or biogeochemical cycling while also allowing the positioning of zooplankton taxa in the food web.

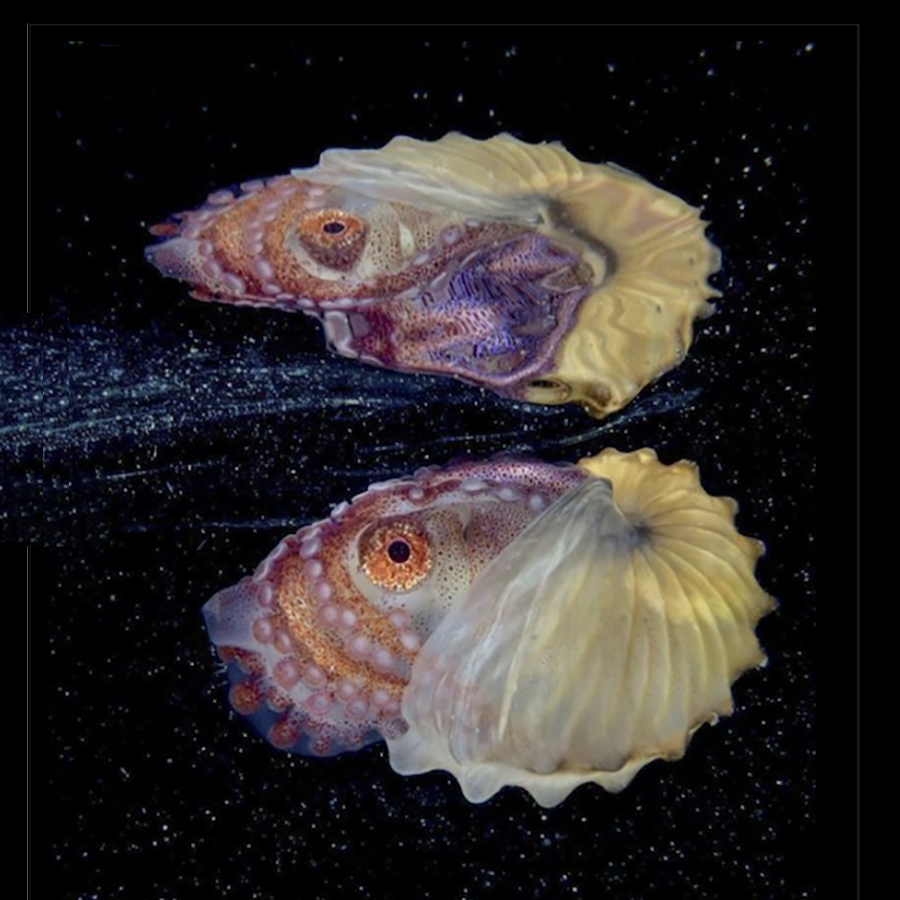
Paper nautilus Argonauta sp.

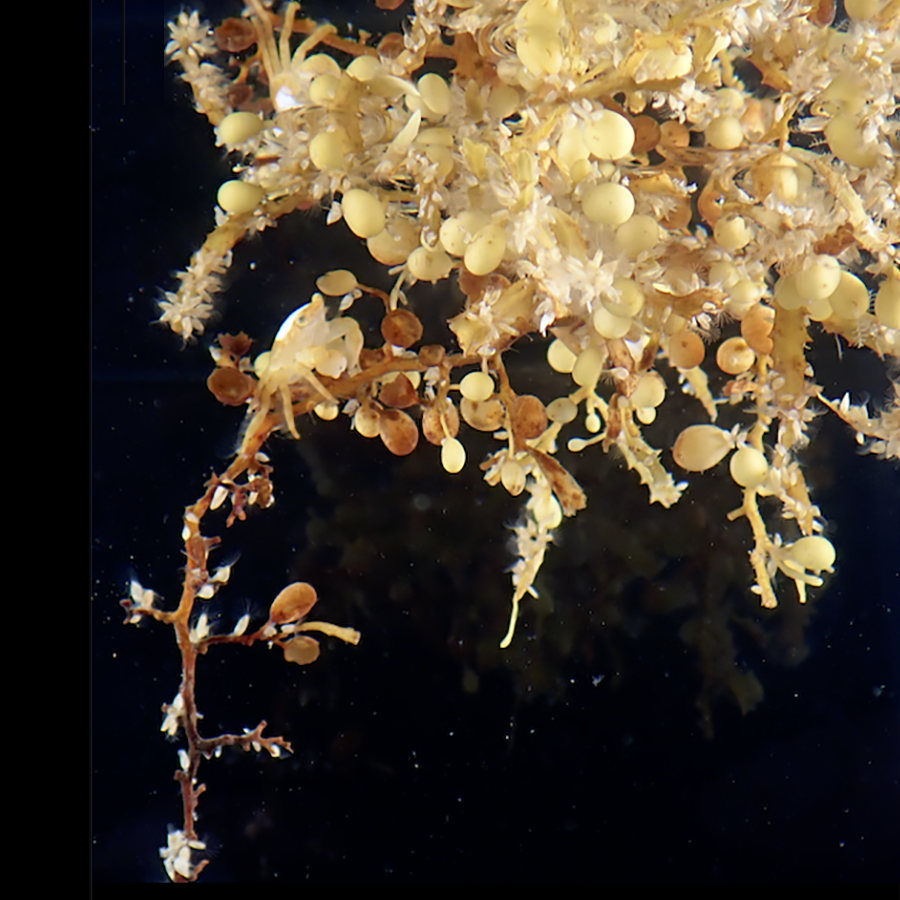
Sargassum sp. seaweed

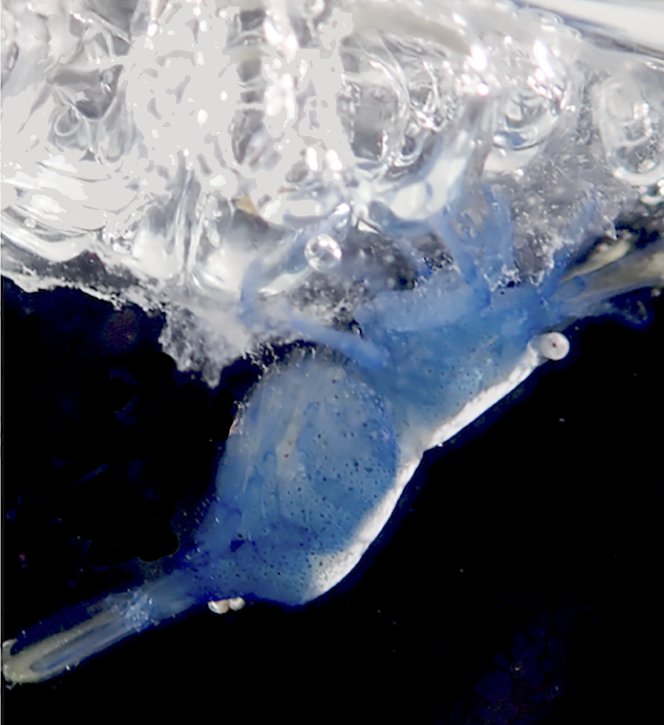
Hippolytidae shrimp

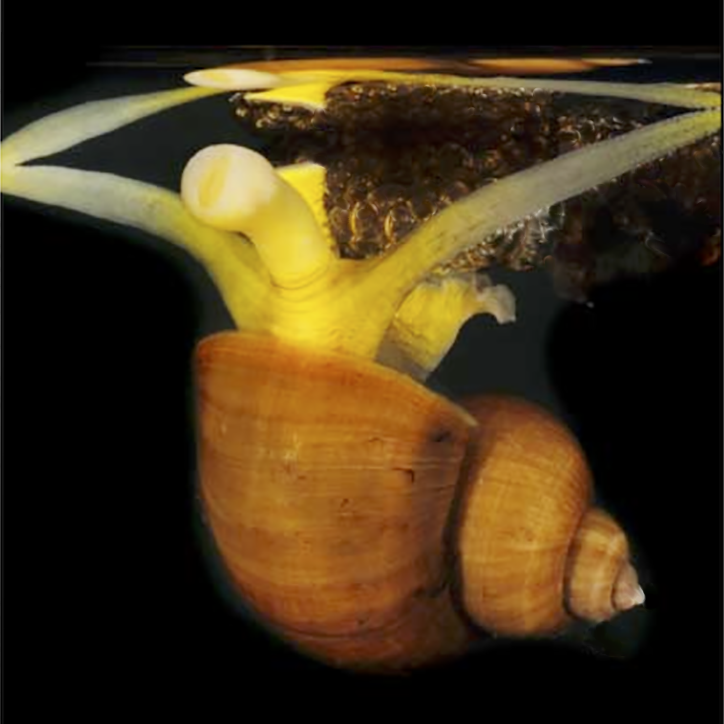
Marine snail Recluzia sp.

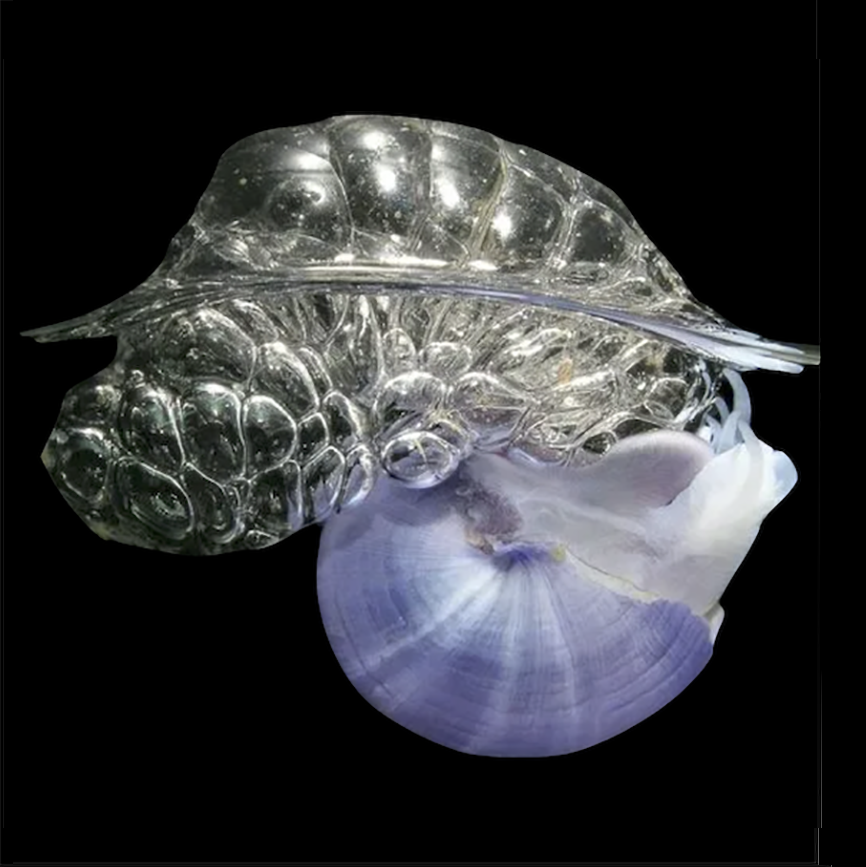
Violet snail Janthina sp.

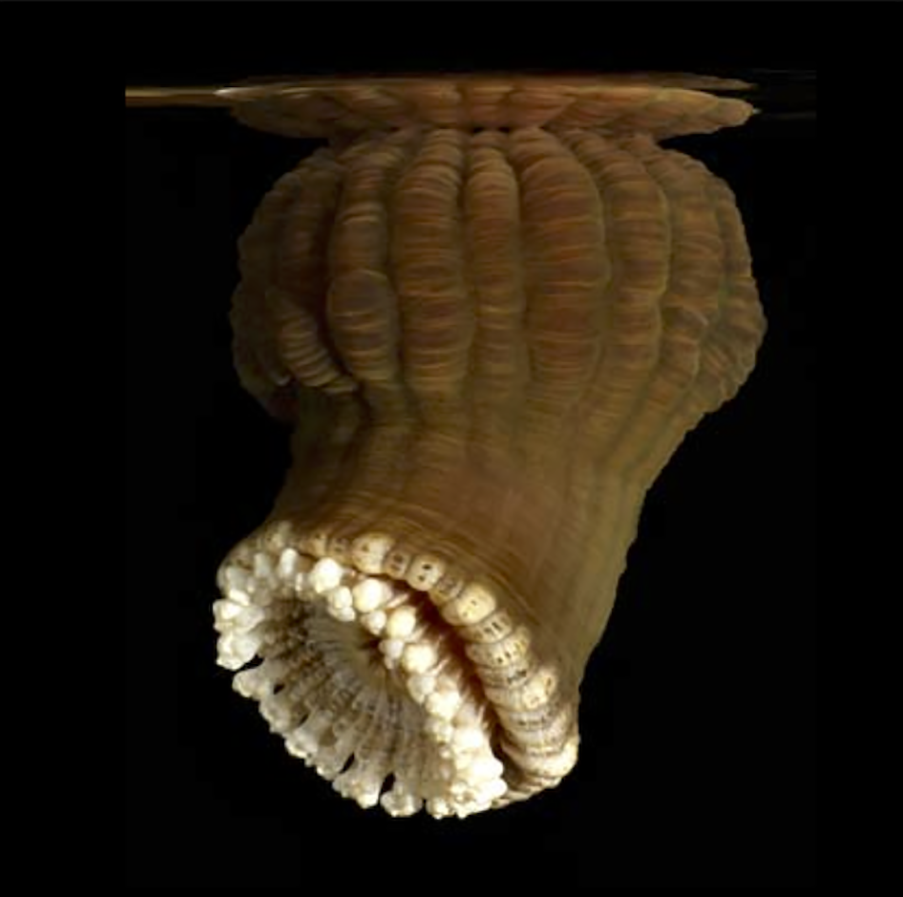
Floating anemone Actinecta sp.

Coral-treaders are a genus of quite rare wingless marine bugs known only from coral reefs in the Indo-Pacific region. During low tide they move over water surfaces around coral atolls and reefs similar to the more familiar water-striders, staying submerged in reef crevices during high tide.

== See also ==
- Bacterioneuston
- Planktonic neuston
- Virioneuston
