= Bubble raft =

Array of bubbles

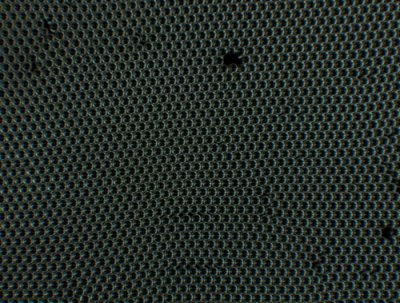
Image of a bubble raft (bubble size ~1.5 mm) showing vacancies and an edge dislocation in the bottom right corner.

A bubble raft is an array of bubbles. It demonstrates materials' microstructural and atomic length-scale behavior by modelling the {111} plane of a close-packed crystal. A material's observable and measurable mechanical properties strongly depend on its atomic and microstructural configuration and characteristics. This fact is intentionally ignored in continuum mechanics, which assumes a material to have no underlying microstructure and be uniform and semi-infinite throughout.

Bubble rafts assemble bubbles on a water surface, often with the help of amphiphilic soaps. These assembled bubbles act like atoms, diffusing, slipping, ripening, straining, and otherwise deforming in a way that models the behavior of the {111} plane of a close-packed crystal. The ideal (lowest energy) state of the assembly would undoubtedly be a perfectly regular single crystal, but just as in metals, the bubbles often form defects, grain boundaries, and multiple crystals.

== History of bubble rafts ==
The concept of bubble raft modelling was first presented in 1947 by Nobel Laureate Sir William Lawrence Bragg and John Nye of Cambridge University's Cavendish Laboratory in Proceedings of the Royal Society A. Legend claims that Bragg conceived of bubble raft models while pouring oil into his lawn mower. He noticed that bubbles on the surface of the oil assembled into rafts resembling the {111} plane of close-packed crystals. Nye and Bragg later presented a method of generating and controlling bubbles on the surface of a glycerine-water-oleic acid-triethanolamine solution, in assemblies of 100,000 or more sub-millimeter sized bubbles. In their paper, they go on at length about the microstructural phenomena observed in bubble rafts and hypothesized in metals.

== Dynamics ==
Avalanches of rupturing bubbles can give rise to self-organized criticality, similar to the Abelian sandpile model.

Bubble rafts exhibit complex dynamics, as illustrated in the video. This is triggered by rupture of a first bubble, driven by thermal fluctuations and a cascade of subsequent bursting bubbles, which can give rise to self-organized criticality, and a power-law distribution of avalanches.

== Relation to crystal lattices ==
In deforming a crystal lattice, one changes the energy and the interatomic potential felt by the atoms of the lattice. This interatomic potential is popularly (and mostly qualitatively) modeled using the Lennard-Jones potential, which consists of a balance between attractive and repulsive forces between atoms.

The "atoms" in Bubble Rafts also exhibit such attractive and repulsive forces:

$$U ( \rho ) = - \pi R^4 \rho_{solution} g 	\left ( \frac{\Beta}{\alpha} \right )^2 \mathit{A} K_0 (\alpha \rho) +
\begin{cases} 0~~~~~~~~~~~~~~~~~~~~~~~~~~~~~~ \rho \ge \ 2 \\ \pi R^4 \rho_{solution} g \left ( \frac{(2-\rho)^2}{\alpha^2} \right ) ~~~ \rho \le\ 2 \end{cases}$$

The portion of the equation to the left of the plus sign is the attractive force, and the portion to the right represents the repulsive force.

$U ( \rho )$ is the interbubble potential

$R$ is the average bubble radius

$\rho_{solution}$ is the density of the solution from which the bubbles are formed

$g$ is the gravitational constant

$\rho$ is the ratio of the distance between bubbles to the bubble radius

$\Beta$ is the radius of ring contact

$\alpha$ is the ratio R/a of the bubble radius to the Laplace constant a, where

$a^2 = \frac {T}{\rho_{solution} g}$

$T$ is the surface tension

$A$ is a constant dependent upon the boundary conditions of the calculation

$K_0$ is a zeroth-order modified Bessel function of the second kind.

Bubble rafts can display numerous phenomena seen in the crystal lattice. This includes such things as point defects (vacancies, substitutional impurities, interstitial atoms), edge dislocations and grains. A screw dislocation can't be modeled in a 2D bubble raft because it extends outside the plane. It is even possible to replicate some microstructure treats such as annealing. The annealing process is simulated by stirring the bubble raft. This anneals out the dislocations (recovery) and promotes recrystallization.

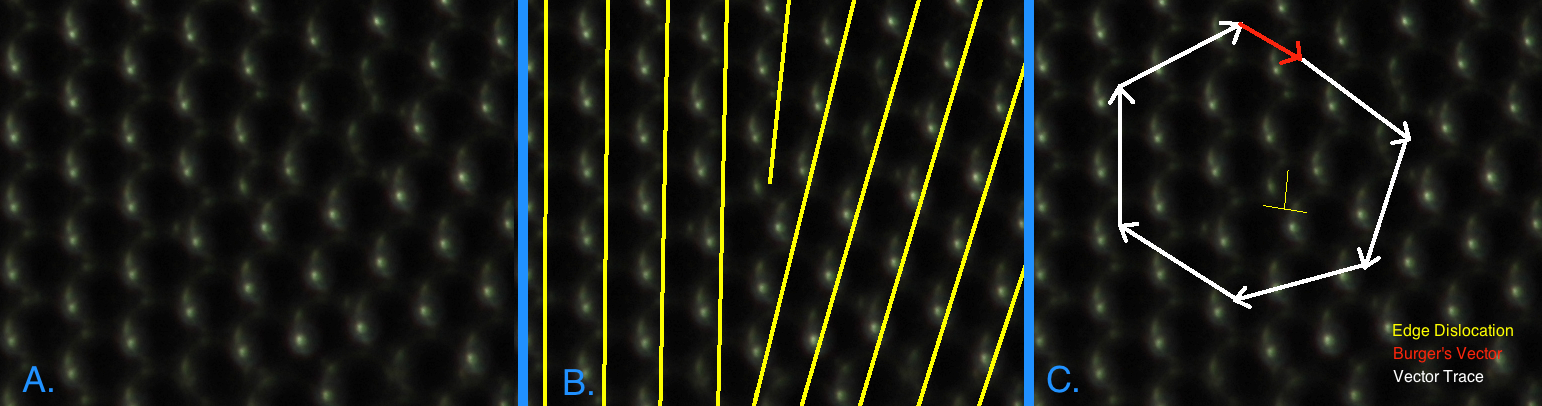
A bubble raft showing a close up of an edge dislocation.
