= Johan de la Faille =

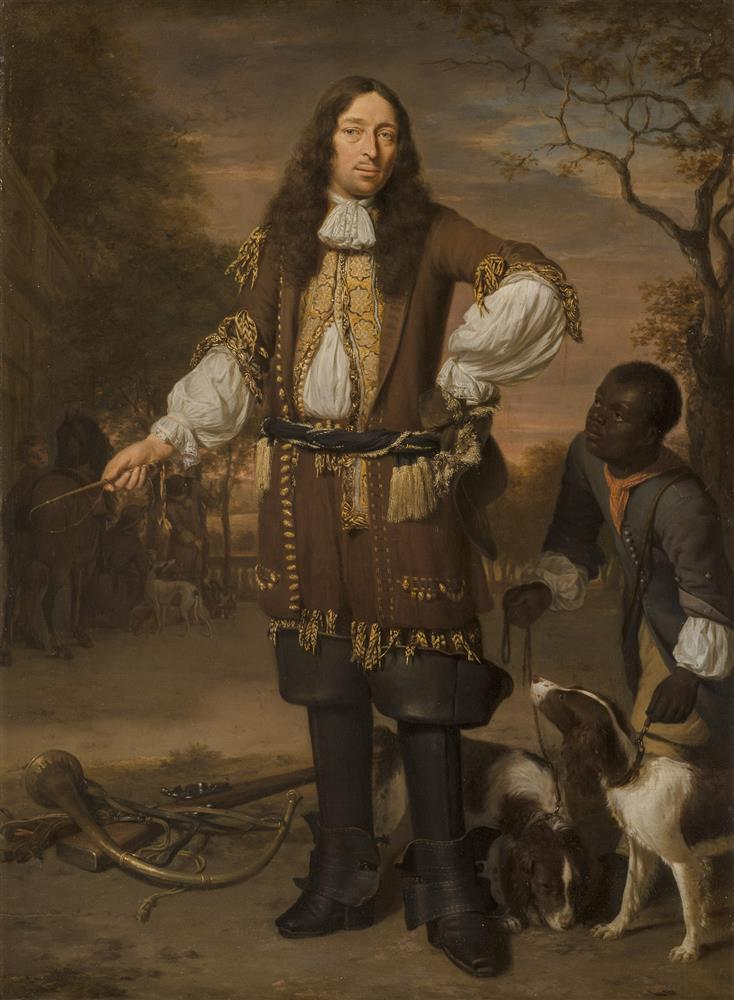
Portrait of Johan de la Faille by Jan Verkolje

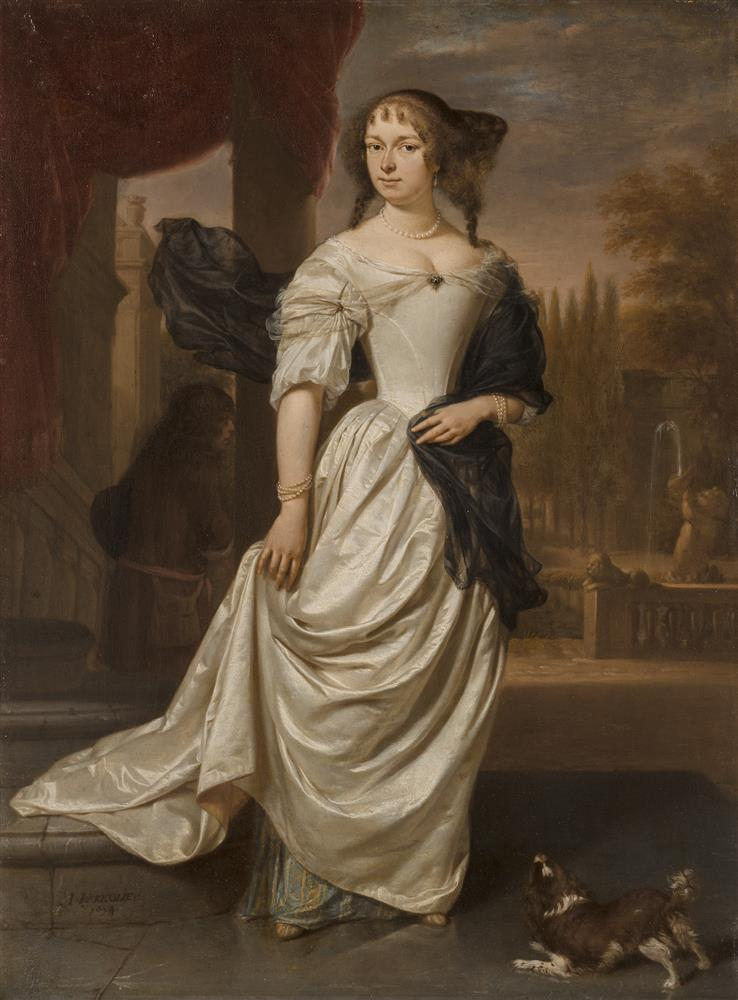
Portrait of Margaretha Delff, Wife of Johan de la Faille by Jan Verkolje

Johan de la Faille (1626 or 26 December 1628 – 14 October 1713) was a member of the vroedschap in Delft. As a supporter of prince William III of Orange, he was appointed in 1672, the Year of Disaster after the First Stadtholderless Period, when the Dutch Republic was in danger.

Johan de la Faille was the owner of a famous curiosity cabinet, which was started by his grandfather and father, mainly of sea shells, including a specimen of the precious wentletrap Epitonium scalare and the cone shell Conus cedonulli, as well as birds, Roman coins and medals, porcelain, tapestries and paintings.

== Life ==
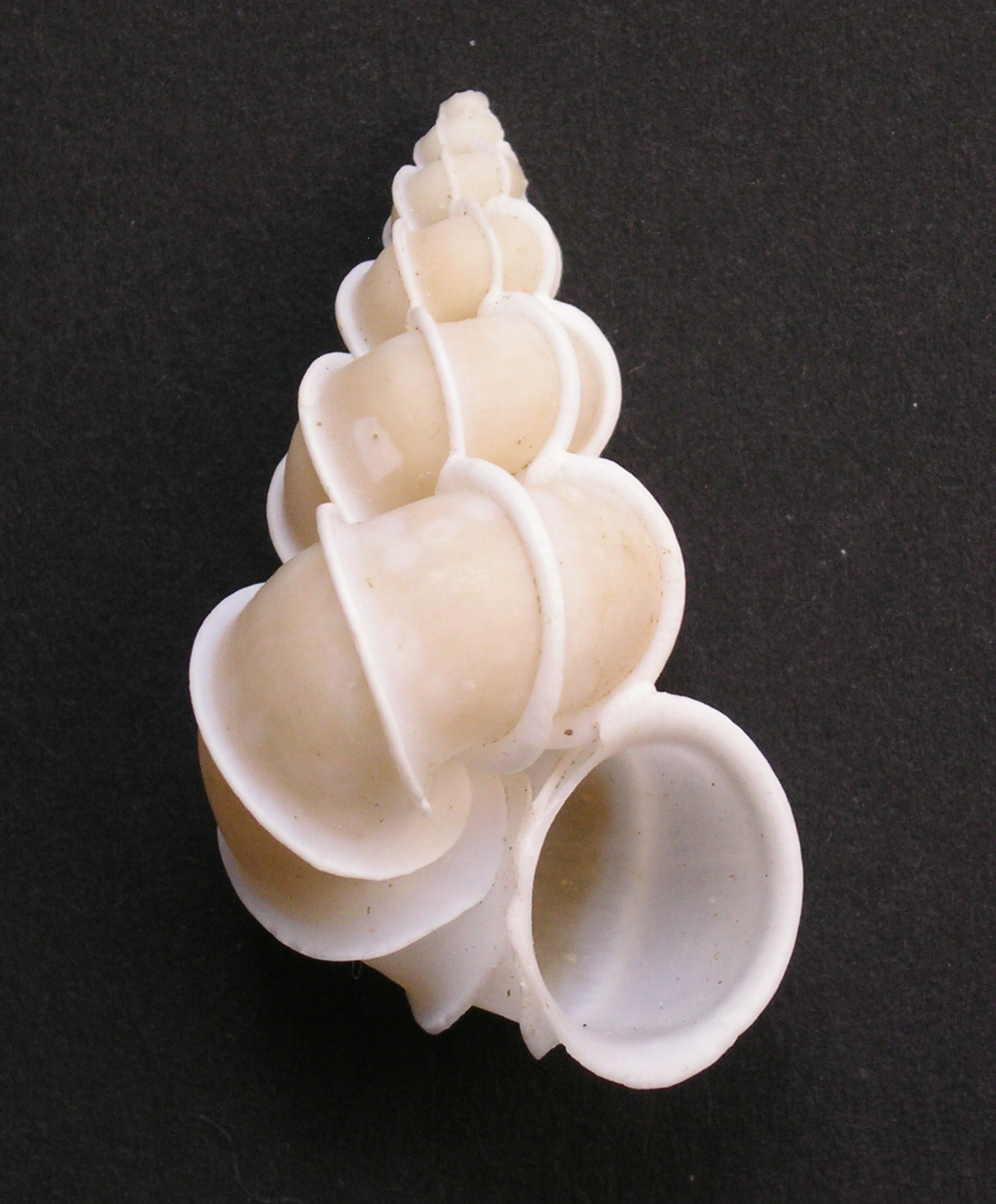
A shell of Epitonium scalare, the precious wentletrap

The family De la Faille or Della Faille has its origin in Antwerp and traded on the Levant already in 1540, with some of its family members taking up residence in Venice. The family split when around 1585 some members emigrated to the North of the Netherlands, c.q. Haarlem, Dordrecht, or Leiden, where they became protestant.

Johan de la Faille's father was Barnardus la Faille who resided in The Hague. His father was an accountant for the stadholder Maurice of Orange. He had married in 1618 with Elisabet Camerling from Delft.

Very little is known of Johan's life. He probably studied law and visited France and Italy in 1667. Johan married on 28 January 1671 with Anna (Margaretha) Delff, (1647–1715). The couple had four children: Johan Bernard, Cornelis, Abraham and Elisabeth. He was bailiff in Delft between 1680 and 1713.
