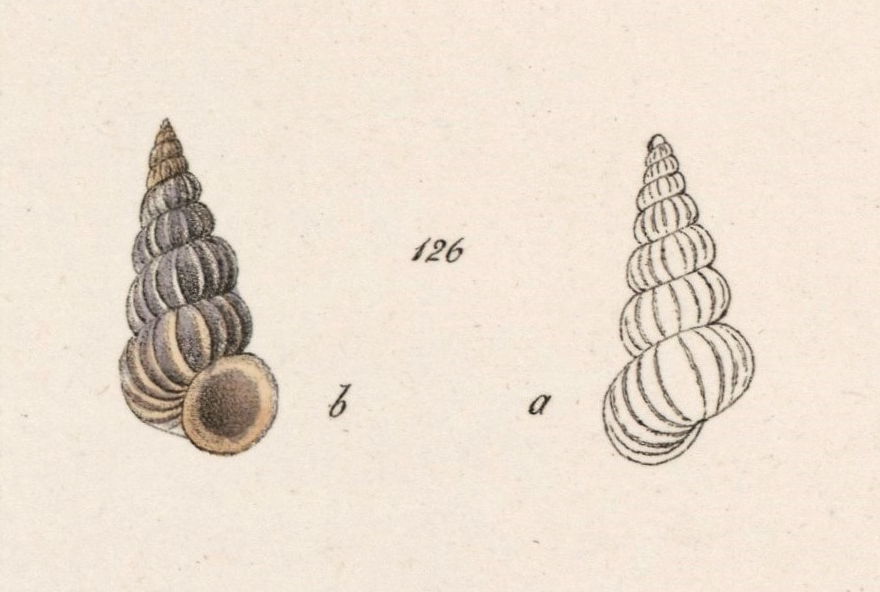
- Epitonium novangliae illustration

Scientific classification
- Kingdom: Animalia
- Phylum: Mollusca
- Class: Gastropoda
- Subclass: Caenogastropoda
- Order: incertae sedis
- Family: Epitoniidae
- Genus: Epitonium
- Species: E. novangliae

Binomial name
- Epitonium novangliae (Couthouy, 1838)

Synonyms
- Scalaria novangliae (Couthouy, 1838); Scala aeospila (Mörch, 1875)

= Epitonium novangliae =

Species of gastropod

Epitonium novangliae, common name the New England wentletrap, is a species of small ectoparasitic sea snail, a marine gastropod mollusc in the family Epitoniidae, the wentletraps.

== Distribution ==
This snail is found in shallow water in the North West Atlantic Ocean, the Gulf of Mexico and the Caribbean Sea.

== Description ==
The maximum recorded shell length is 20 mm.

== Habitat ==
Minimum recorded depth is 0 m. Maximum recorded depth is 457 m.
