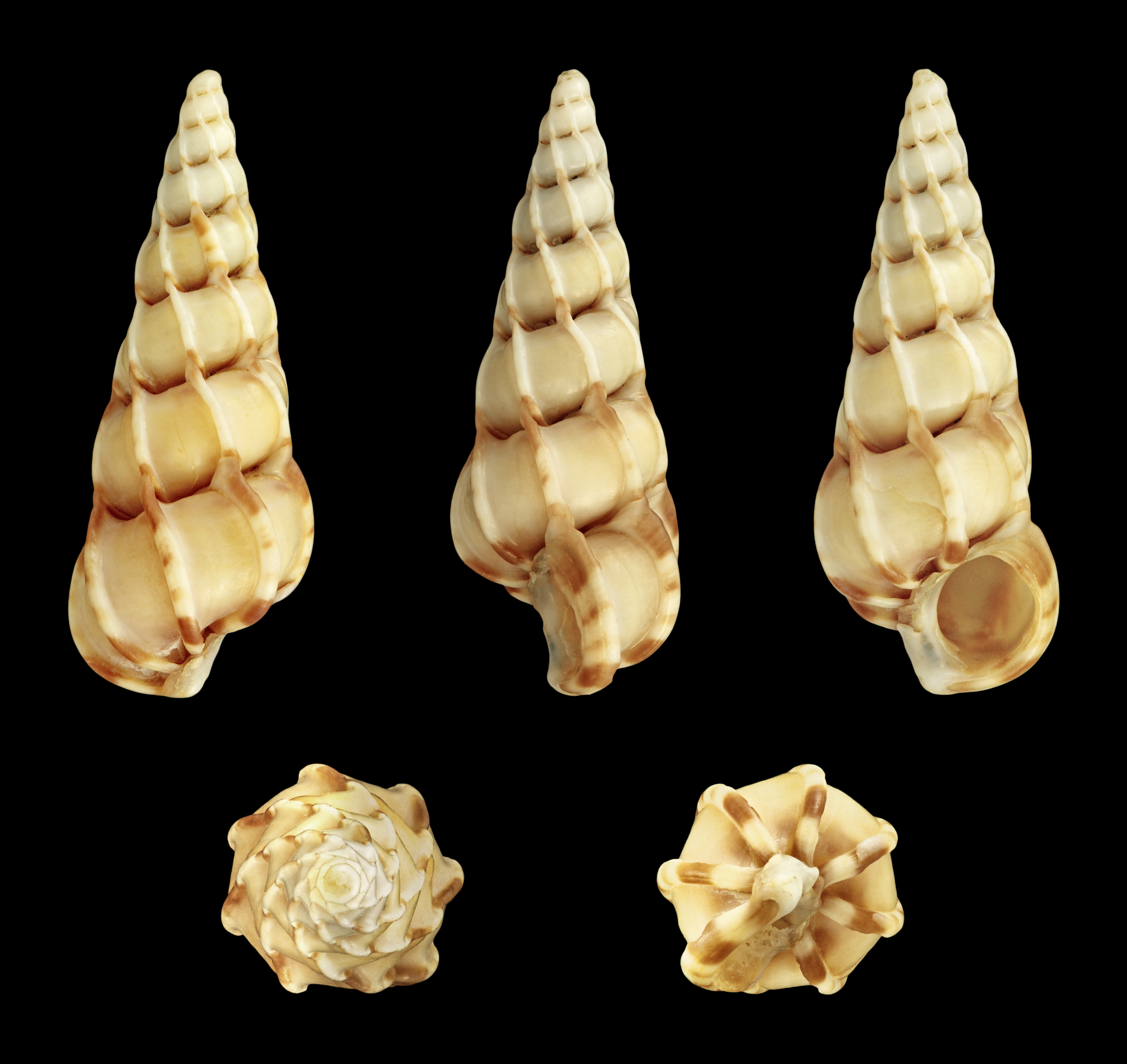

Scientific classification
- Kingdom: Animalia
- Phylum: Mollusca
- Class: Gastropoda
- Subclass: Caenogastropoda
- Order: incertae sedis
- Family: Epitoniidae
- Genus: Epitonium
- Species: E. clathrus

Binomial name
- Epitonium clathrus (Linnaeus, 1758)

Synonyms
- List: Clathrus amabilis G. Coen, 1937; Clathrus clathrus Linnaeus, 1758; Clathrus corenatus G. Coen, 1937; Clathrus mediterraneum Kobelt, 1887; Clathrus nanus G. Coen, 1937; Clathrus plancianus G. Coen, 1937; Clathrus rubeolus G. Coen, 1937; Claviscala elongata (Fenaux, 1943); Epitonium annulatum Milaschewitsch, 1909; Epitonium clathrum mediterraneum (Kobelt, 1887); Epitonium clathrum minimum Nordsieck, 1968; Epitonium commune (Lamarck, 1822) (junior synonym); Epitonium commune annulatum Milaschewitch, 1909; Epitonium communis (Lamarck, 1819) (incorrect gender ending); Epitonium elongatum Röding, 1798; Epitonium jousseaumei (Locard, 1892); Epitonium mediterraneum (Locard & Caziot, 1901); Epitonium obsita (Locard, 1886); Epitonium valentini Röding, 1798; Parviscala jousseaumei (Locard, 1892); Scala clathrus (Linnaeus, 1758); Scalaria clathra (Linnaeus, 1758); Scalaria clathra Lovén, 1846; Scalaria communis Lamarck, 1822; Scalaria histriaca Féneaux, A., 1943; Scalaria histriaca var. elongata Fenaux, 1943; Scalaria jousseaumei Locard, 1892; Scalaria laevigata Calcara, 1840; Scalaria mediterranea Locard & Caziot, 1901; Scalaria mediterranea var. elongata Locard & Caziot, 1901; Scalaria mediterranea var. major Locard & Caziot, 1901; Scalaria mediterranea var. minor Locard & Caziot, 1901; Scalaria obsita Locard, 1886; Scalaria tumida Risso, 1826; Strombiformis clathratus da Costa, 1779; Turbo clathrus Linnaeus, 1758

= Epitonium clathrus =

Species of gastropod

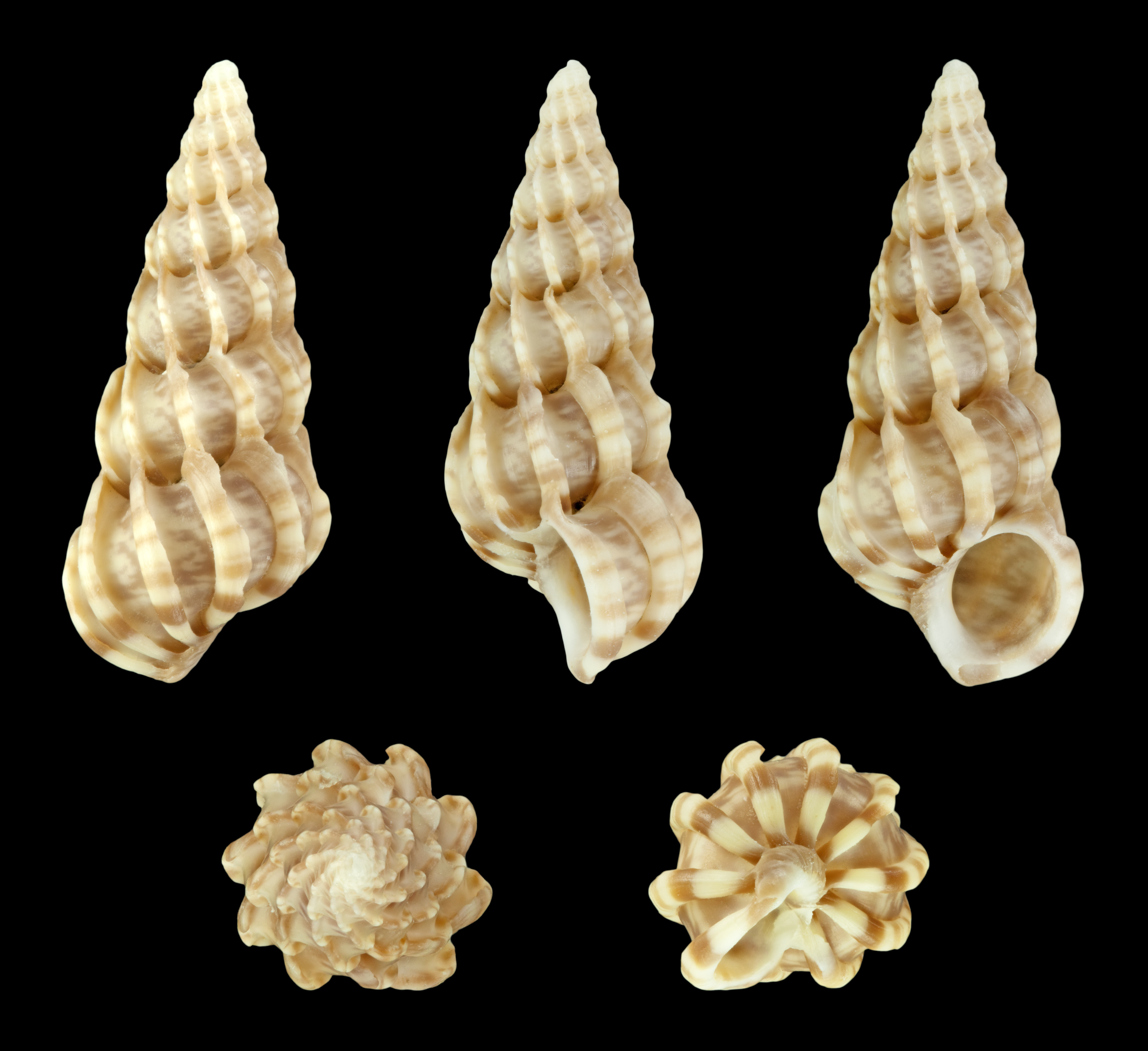
Subspecies E. c. mediterraneum

Epitonium clathrus, also known as the common wentletrap, is a species of small predatory sea snail, a marine gastropod mollusc in the family Epitoniidae, the wentletraps.

== Taxonomy ==
Originally described by Carl Linnaeus as Turbo clathrus, it was later known as Clathrus clathrus, Scalaria communis and Epitonium commune.

== Distribution ==
The common wentletrap is very common along the eastern Atlantic coast, in the North Sea up to Norway, the Mediterranean and the Black Sea. Live specimens have only rarely been observed. While it does occur in the Baltic Sea, it has become a vulnerable species there.

== Feeding habits ==
Epitonium clathrus is a predator of sea anemones (Anthozoa, Actiniaria) and corals (Anthozoa, Scleractinia). It has been seen feeding on the sea anemone Anemonia sulcata and found in the neighbourhood of sea anemones Sagartia troglodytes and Sargartiogeton undatus.

== Description ==
Shell: The cone-shaped shell reaches a height of 35 mm. It is shiny white to cream coloured, often with brown spots. Seven thick and very distinct costae (spiral ribs) wind around twelve to fifteen whorls. These convex whorls often contain two or three purple bands that can best seen when they cross the lamella of the outer lip. The protoconch is usually blunt. The aperture is entire and rounded. Its top coincides with a suture. The umbilicus is lacking. The operculum is horny and paucispiral.

Soft parts (data compiled from George Washington Tryon (1887) and Johannes Thiele (1929)): The short foot is truncated in front and extends far in advance of the head. The long tentacles are narrow and close together. The eyes are situated on the base of the tentacles. The mantle margin is simple and contains a rudimentary siphonal fold. The radula is wide and more or less bent at the end. The radular teeth are elongate and hook shaped or needle shaped, with many teeth in a series. The species is hermaphroditic.
