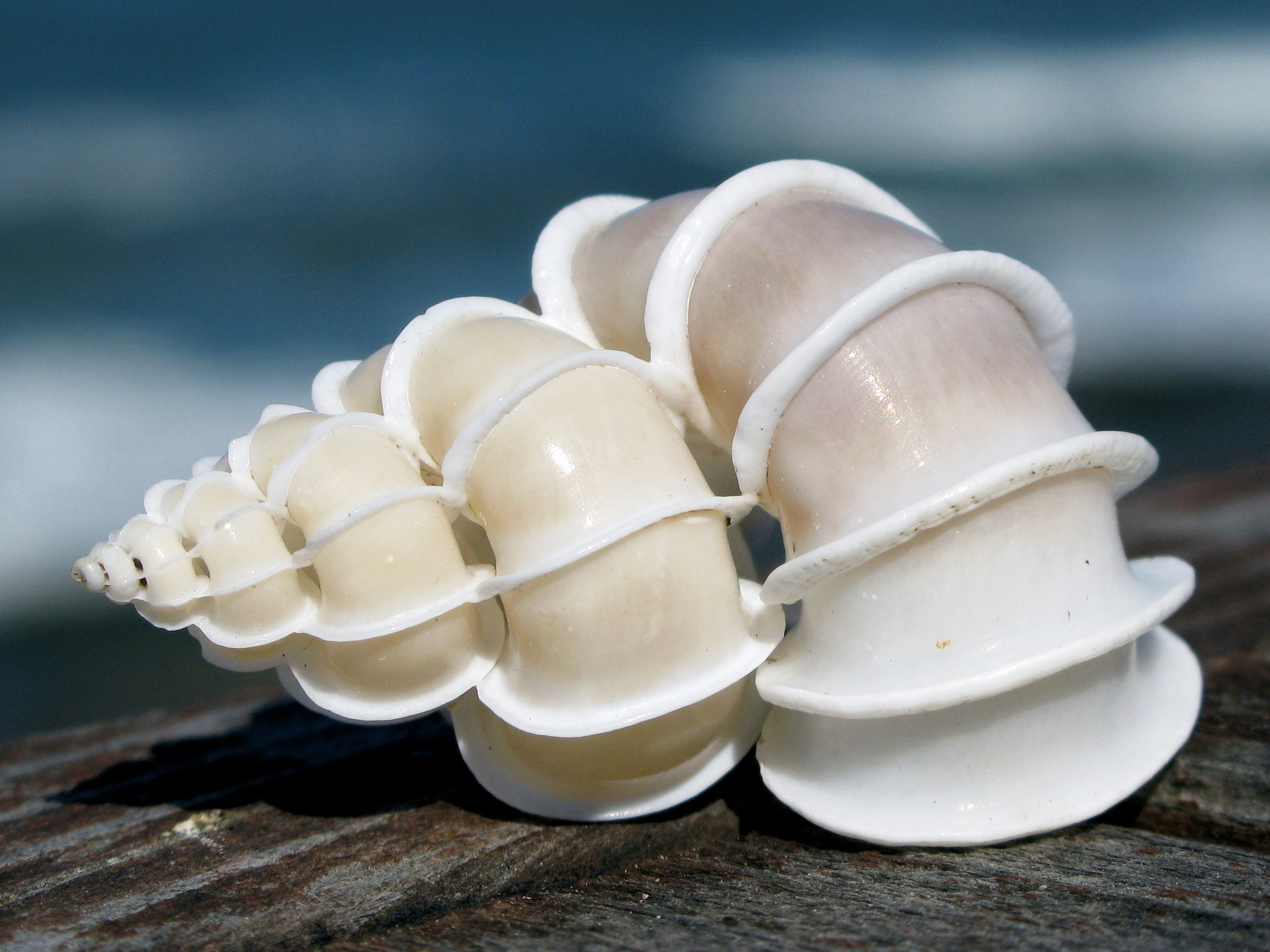
- The sculpture of the shell of Epitonium scalare has raised ribs that are known as costae. Costae are an almost universal feature in shells of Epitonium species.

Scientific classification
- Kingdom: Animalia
- Phylum: Mollusca
- Class: Gastropoda
- Subclass: Caenogastropoda
- Order: incertae sedis
- Family: Epitoniidae
- Genus: Epitonium; Linnaeus, 1758

Type species
- Turbo scalaris Linnaeus, 1758

Synonyms
- See text

= Epitonium =

Genus of gastropods

Epitonium is a genus of small predatory sea snails, marine gastropod mollusks. Epitonium is the type genus of the family Epitoniidae, the wentletraps.

The common name wentletraps is derived from the Dutch word wenteltrap, denoting a spiral staircase. This refers to the striking form and sculpture of the shells of the mollusks in this genus, and to a lesser extent, the whole family.

The genus Epitonium has been divided in the past by some authors into several subgenera, but these subgenera were based only on shell characters and did not reflect the true underlying relationships or phylogeny.

== Shell description ==
Epitonium shells are high-spired, and are all-white in most of the species within this genus. A few species are tinted with brown to varying degrees, or have a brown stripe on the shoulder of the whorl. The shells typically have blade-like vertical ribs, known as costae.

== Habitat ==
Wentletraps usually live in sand near sea anemones or corals.

== Life habits ==
These snails are predators and feed by inserting their proboscis and biting out small pieces of the anemone's tissues. Some species of wentletrap feed on only one species of sea anemone, in other words they are species-specific in terms of their prey.

== Synonymised genera ==
Many species that now are placed in the genus Epitonium have, over the years, been classified in other genera. These have become synonyms of Epitonium :

- Aciona Leach, 1815
- Acutiscala de Boury, 1909
- Amiciscala Jousseaume, 1912
- Anguliscala de Boury, 1909
- Asperiscala de Boury, 1909
- Avalitiscala de Boury, 1912
- Cinctiscala de Boury, 1909
- Cirratiscala de Boury, 1909)
- Clathrus Oken, 1815
- Connexiscala de Boury, 1909
- Crenuliscala Iredale, 1936
- Crisposcala de Boury, 1886
- Cyclostoma Lamarck, 1799
- Decussiscala de Boury, 1909
- Delicatiscala de Boury, 1909
- Dulciscala de Boury, 1909
- Eburniscala de Boury, 1909
- Epitonium (Asperiscala) de Boury, 1909
- Epitonium (Clathrus)
- Epitonium (Epitonium) Röding, 1798 · accepted, alternate representation
- Epitonium (Hyaloscala) de Boury, 1889 · accepted, alternate representation
- Epitonium (Papyriscala) de Boury, 1909 accepted, alternate representation
- Evolutiscala de Boury, 1909
- Firmiscala de Boury, 1909
- Folaceiscala de Boury, 1912
- Foliaceiscala de Boury, 1912
- Foraceiscala de Boury, 1911
- Foveoscala de Boury, 1909
- Fragiliscala Azuma, 1962
- Fusicoscala Monterosato, 1890
- Glabriscala de Boury, 1909
- Graciliscala de Boury, 1909
- Gradatiscala de Boury, 1909
- Gyroscala (Fragiliscala) Azuma, 1962
- Hirtoscala Monterosato, 1890
- Hyaloscala de Boury, 1890
- Innesiscala Jousseaume, 1912
- Janthoscala Mörch, 1875
- Labeoscala de Boury, 1912
- Laeviscala de Boury, 1909
- Lamelliscala de Boury, 1909
- Lepidiscala de Boury, 1909
- Limiscala de Boury, 1909
- Limniscala Dollfus, 1913
- Linctoscala Monterosato, 1890
- Lineoscala de Boury, 1909
- Mazescala Iredale, 1936
- Melanopsis Férussac, 1807
- Minutiscala de Boury, 1909
- Nipponoscala Masahito & Habe, 1973
- Nitidiscala de Boury, 1909
- Nitidoscala Strong, 1930
- Papyriscala de Boury, 1909
- Parviscala de Boury, 1887
- Perlucidiscala de Boury, 1912
- Pudentiscala Iredale, 1938
- Pupiscala Masahito, Kuroda & Habe, 1971
- Resticuliscala Cossmann, 1912
- Reticuliscala de Boury, 1909
- Scala Mörch, 1852
- Scala (Innesiscala) de Boury in Jousseaume, 1912
- Scala (Perlucidiscala) de Boury in Jousseaume, 1912
- Scalaria Lamarck, 1801
- Scalaria (Parviscala) de Boury, 1887
- Scalarus Montfort, 1810 (Unjustified emendation of Scalaria)
- Scalatarius Duméril, 1806
- Sodaliscala de Boury, 1909
- Sphaeroscala Monterosato, 1890
- Spiniscala de Boury, 1909
- Turbiniscala de Boury, 1909
- Viciniscala de Boury, 1909

== Species ==
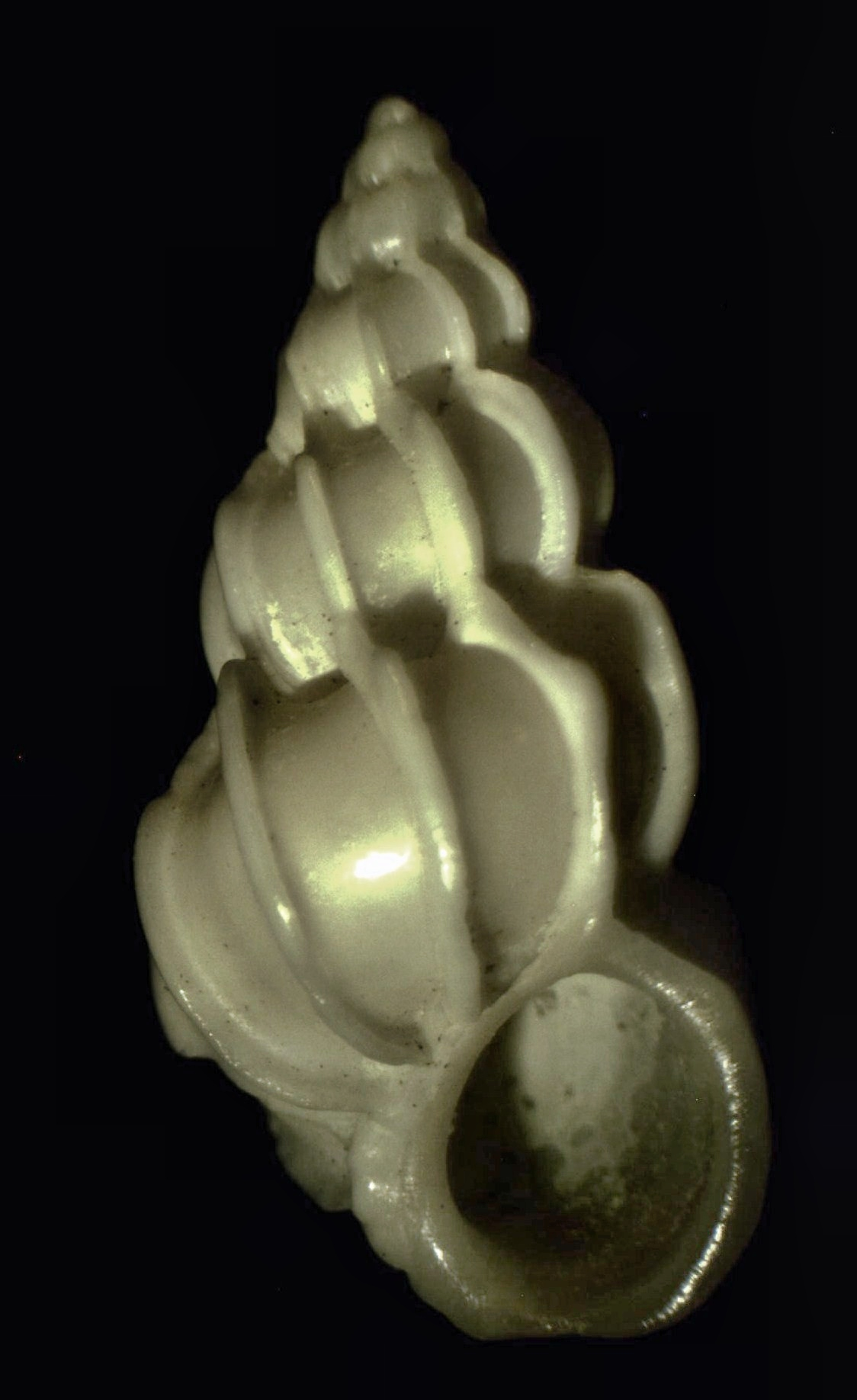
Epitonium hexagonum

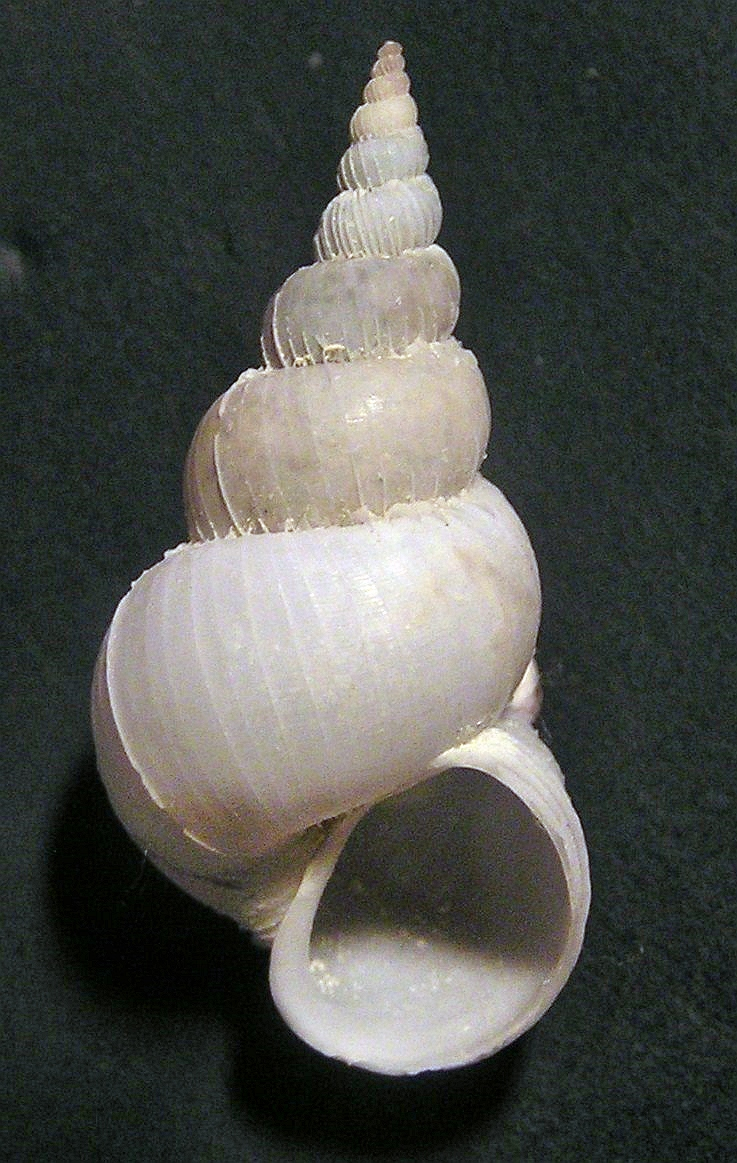
Epitonium irregulare

Species within the genus Epitonium include:

Note: Some malacologists have recently placed many of the more than 600 named species into other genera, which were previously considered to be subgenera of the genus Epitonium. On the other hand, many species that belonged to subgenera of Epitonium are now included in Epitonium. These subgenera were based on details of the shell sculpture and not on molecular analysis.

- Epitonium abyssicola (Schepman, 1909)
- Epitonium acanthopleurum (Verco, 1906)
- Epitonium acapulcanum Dall, 1917
- Epitonium actinariophilum (Masahito & Habe 1976)
- Epitonium aculeatum (G. B. Sowerby II, 1844)
- Epitonium adjunctum (Jousseaume, 1912)
- Epitonium aequale (Thiele, 1925)
- Epitonium agitabile (Jousseaume, 1912)
- Epitonium alabiforme Kilburn, 1985
- Epitonium alatum (G. B. Sowerby II, 1844)
- Epitonium albidum (d'Orbigny, 1842) - bladed wentletrap
- Epitonium albolineatum (G. B. Sowerby II, 1844)
- Epitonium algerianum (Weinkauff, 1866)
- Epitonium alizonum (Melvill, 1912)
- Epitonium amathusium (Melvill & Standen, 1903)
- Epitonium amicum (Jousseaume, 1894)
- Epitonium amiculum Kilburn, 1985
- Epitonium amplexus Nakayama, 2003
- Epitonium anabathmos Kilburn, 1985
- Epitonium ancillotoi Cossignani T. & Cossignani V., 1998
- Epitonium angulatum (Say, 1830) - angulate wentletrap
- Epitonium angulicinctum (de Boury, 1913)
- Epitonium antisoa (Iredale, 1936)
- Epitonium apiculatum (Dall, 1889) - semismooth wentletrap
- Epitonium aranea Bonfitto, 2017
- Epitonium arcanum DuShane, 1979
- Epitonium artimi (Jousseaume, 1912)
- Epitonium atomus (E. A. Smith, 1890)
- Epitonium attenuatum (Sowerby, J. de C., 1874)
- Epitonium audouini (Jousseaume, 1894)
- Epitonium aureomaculatum (Masahito & Habe, 1973)
- Epitonium auritum (G. B. Sowerby II, 1844)
- Epitonium austrocaledonicum (Montrouzier, 1859)
- Epitonium avalites (Jousseaume, 1912)
- Epitonium babylonium (Dall, 1889) - tower wentletrap
- Epitonium barissum (Iredale, 1936)
- Epitonium beachportense (Cotton & Godfrey, 1938)
- Epitonium bellastriatum (Carpenter, 1864)
- Epitonium bellicosum Hedley, 1907
- Epitonium bengalense (E. A. Smith, 1899)
- Epitonium bevdeynzerae Garcia E., 2001
- Epitonium blainei Clench & Turner, 1953
- Epitonium bonaespei (Barnard, 1963)
- Epitonium bouryi (Jousseaume, 1894)
- Epitonium boutetorum Garcia, 2016
- Epitonium brachyspeira Kilburn, 1985
- Epitonium brevissimum (Seguenza, 1876)
- Epitonium bucknilli Powell, 1924
- Epitonium bulbulum (Sowerby II, 1844)
- Epitonium bullatum (Sowerby, 1844)
- Epitonium caamanoi Dall & Bartsch, 1910
- Epitonium calideum (Melvill & Standen, 1903)
- Epitonium californicum Dall, 1917
- Epitonium callipeplum Dall, 1919
- Epitonium candeanum (d'Orbigny, 1842)
- Epitonium candidissimum (Monterosato, 1877)
- Epitonium canna Dall, 1919
- Epitonium cantrainei (Weinkauff, 1866)
- Epitonium carchedon (Iredale, 1936)
- Epitonium castum (A. Adams, 1873)
- Epitonium catalinae Dall, 1908
- Epitonium catalinense Dall, 1917
- Epitonium catanuense (G. B. Sowerby II, 1844)
- Epitonium celesti (Aradas, 1854)
- Epitonium cerdantum (Melvill & Standen, 1903)
- Epitonium championi Clench & Turner, 1952
- Epitonium chiarae Bozzetti, 2007
- Epitonium chinglinae Lee & Wu, 1998
- Epitonium christiani Bozzetti, 2008
- Epitonium christyi (Iredale, 1936)
- Epitonium clathratulum (Kanmacher, 1798)
- Epitonium clathrus Linnaeus, 1758 - common wentletrap
- Epitonium clementinum Grateloup, J.P.S. de, 1840
- Epitonium climacotum Kilburn, 1985
- Epitonium columba Kilburn, 1985
- Epitonium columnella Dall, 1917
- Epitonium commodum (E. A. Smith, 1890)
- Epitonium commutatum Monterosato, 1877
- Epitonium conjunctum (Yokoyama, 1922)
- Epitonium connexum (G. B. Sowerby II, 1844)
- Epitonium continens (Melvill & Standen, 1903)
- Epitonium cookeanum Dall, 1917
- Epitonium cophinodes (Melvill, 1904)
- Epitonium coretum (Iredale, 1936)
- Epitonium corniculum Y.-C. Lee & C.-W. Huang, 2016
- Epitonium coronatum Lamarck, 1816: synonym of Gyroscala coronata (Lamarck, 1816)
- Epitonium coutieri (Jousseaume, 1912)
- Epitonium couturieri (de Boury, 1912)
- Epitonium crassicostatum Gittenberger & Gittenberger, 2005
- Epitonium crassilabrum
- Epitonium crassum (G. B. Sowerby II, 1847)
- Epitonium creberrimum (Hinds, 1843)
- Epitonium crebricostatum Carpenter, 1864
- Epitonium crispatum (Pease, 1863)
- Epitonium crypticorona Kilburn, 1985
- Epitonium cultellicostum (de Boury, 1913)
- Epitonium cumingii (Carpenter, 1856)
- Epitonium curvilineatum (G. B. Sowerby II, 1844)
- Epitonium dallianum (Verrill & Smith, 1880)
- Epitonium deflersi (Jousseaume, 1912)
- Epitonium deificum (Melvill & Standen, 1903)
- Epitonium denticulatum (Sowerby II, 1844) tooth-rib wentletrap
- Epitonium dentiscalpium (Watson, 1883)
- Epitonium deschampsi Garcia, 2003
- Epitonium dubium (G. B. Sowerby II, 1844)
- Epitonium duocamurum Lee Y.C., 2001
- Epitonium durhamianum Hertlein & Strong, 1951
- Epitonium eboreum (E. A. Smith, 1906)
- Epitonium eclecticum (Melvill & Standen, 1903)
- Epitonium elenense (G. B. Sowerby II, 1844)
- Epitonium elisae Bozzetti, 2007
- Epitonium eltanini (Dell, 1990)
- Epitonium emiliae (Melvill & Standen, 1903)
- Epitonium emydonesus Dall, 1917
- Epitonium erroneum (Tapparone-Canefri, 1876)
- Epitonium eulita (Dall & Simpson, 1901)
- Epitonium eusculptum (Sowerby III, 1903)
- Epitonium eutaenium Dall, 1917
- Epitonium evanidstriatum Zelaya & Güller, 2017
- Epitonium eximiellum (Masahito, Kuroda & Habe, 1971)
- Epitonium eximium (A. Adams & Reeve, 1850)
- Epitonium extenuicostum (de Boury, 1913)
- Epitonium fabrizioi Pastorino & Penchaszadeh, 1998
- Epitonium falconi Kilburn, 1985
- Epitonium fasciatum (Sowerby, 1844)
- Epitonium fauroti (Jousseaume, 1912)
- Epitonium fenestratum (Strebel, 1908)
- Epitonium ferminense L. G. Brown, 2019
- Epitonium ferrugineum (Mörch, 1852)
- Epitonium ferussacii (Audouin, 1816)
- Epitonium fischeri (Watson, 1897)
- Epitonium foliaceicosta (d'Orbigny, 1842) - wrinkle-rib wentletrap
- Epitonium fractum Dall, 1927 - humble wentletrap
- Epitonium fragile (Hanley, 1840)
- Epitonium friabile (G. B. Sowerby II, 1844)
- Epitonium frielei (Dall, 1889)
- Epitonium fucatum (Pease, 1861)
- Epitonium fulvovittatum (Dautzenberg, 1890)
- Epitonium georgettinum (Kiener, 1839)
- Epitonium glabratum (Hinds, 1843)
- Epitonium gloriolum (Melvill & Standen, 1901)
- Epitonium godfreyi Cotton, 1938
- Epitonium goldsmithi (DuShane, 1988)
- Epitonium goniophorum (Melvill & Standen, 1903)
- Epitonium gracile (G. B. Sowerby II, 1844)
- Epitonium graciliconfusum Nakayama, 2000
- Epitonium gradaticostatum (Fenaux, 1938)
- Epitonium gradatum (G. B. Sowerby II, 1844)
- Epitonium gradilis (Jousseaume, F.P., 1912)
- Epitonium graviarmatum Gittenberger & Gittenberger, 2005
- Epitonium gravieri (Jousseaume, F.P., 1912)
- Epitonium greenlandicum (Perry, 1811) - Greenland wentletrap
- Epitonium habeli Dall, 1917
- Epitonium hamatulae Preston, 1915
- Epitonium hancocki DuShane, 1970
- Epitonium harimaense Makiyama, 1924
- Epitonium harpa (Jousseaume, 1912)
- Epitonium harpago Kilburn, 1985
- Epitonium hartogi Gittenberger, 2003
- Epitonium hayashii (Habe, 1961)
- Epitonium heloris (Iredale, 1936)
- Epitonium hemmesi DuShane, 1988
- Epitonium hexagonum (G. B. Sowerby II, 1844)
- Epitonium hindsii (Carpenter, 1856)
- Epitonium hispidulum (Monterosato, 1874)
- Epitonium histricosum (Jousseaume, 1912)
- Epitonium hoeksemai Gittenberger, A., Goud & Gittenberger, E., 2000: synonym of Epifungium hoeksemai (A. Gittenberger & Goud, 2000)
- Epitonium hueti Bozzetti, 2011
- Epitonium huffmani DuShane & McLean, 1968
- Epitonium humerosum (Sowerby III, 1901)
- Epitonium humphreysii (Kiener, 1838) - Humphrey's wentletrap
- Epitonium hyalinum (Sowerby, G.B. II, 1844)
- Epitonium idalium (Melvill, 1912)
- Epitonium ilariae Bozzetti, 2007
- Epitonium illovoense (Barnard, 1963)
- Epitonium immaculatum (Sowerby II, 1844)
- Epitonium imperiale (G. B. Sowerby II, 1844)
- Epitonium inaequale (Thiele, 1925)
- Epitonium indianorum (Carpenter, 1865)
- Epitonium indistinctum (G. B. Sowerby II, 1844)
- Epitonium inexpertum L. Brown & Weil, 1999
- Epitonium ingridae Gittenberger, A., Goud & Gittenberger, E., 2000
- Epitonium innesi (Jousseaume, 1912)
- Epitonium interstriatum (G. B. Sowerby, 1905)
- Epitonium irregulare (Sowerby, G.B. II, 1844)
- Epitonium ishimotoi (Masahito & Habe, 1976)
- Epitonium jani Segers, Swinnen & De Prins, 2009
- Epitonium japonicum (Dunker, 1861)
- Epitonium jickelii (Clessin, 1897)
- Epitonium jimpyae Kilburn, 1985
- Epitonium jolyi (Monterosato, 1878)
- Epitonium jomardi (Audouin, J.-V., 1827)
- Epitonium jousseaumei (de Boury, 1886)
- Epitonium juanitae Garcia, 2003
- Epitonium jukesianum (Forbes, 1852)
- Epitonium kastoroae Garcia, 2003
- Epitonium kazusense (Yokoyama, 1922)
- Epitonium kilburni Drivas & Jay, 1989
- Epitonium kiyohimae Nakayama, 2000
- Epitonium klunzingeri (Clessin, 1897)
- Epitonium koshimagani (Nakayama, 1991)
- Epitonium koyamai (Nakayama, 1995)
- Epitonium kraussi (Nyst, 1871)
- Epitonium krebsii (Mörch, 1875) - Krebs' wentletrap
- Epitonium labeo (Jousseaume, 1912)
- Epitonium lachrymulum (Jousseaume, 1912)
- Epitonium lacrima Kilburn, 1985
- Epitonium laidlawi (Melvill & Standen, 1903)
- Epitonium lamellosum (Lamarck, 1822) - lamellose wentletrap
- Epitonium latedis Boury, E.A. de, 1911
- Epitonium latifasciatum (Sowerby II, 1874)
- Epitonium latum Bozzetti, 2009
- Epitonium leali Garcia, 2011
- Epitonium laxatoides Nakayama, 1995
- Epitonium liliputanum (A. Adams, 1861)
- Epitonium linctum (de Boury & Monterosato, 1890)
- Epitonium lineolatum (G. B. Sowerby II, 1844)
- Epitonium lochi Gittenberger, A., Goud & Gittenberger, E., 2000
- Epitonium lowei (Dall, 1906)
- Epitonium luceo (DuShane, 1988)
- Epitonium lyra (Sowerby, 1847)
- Epitonium macleani DuShane, 1970
- Epitonium macromphalus E. A. Smith, 1910
- Epitonium maestratii Garcia E., 2003
- Epitonium malayanum (Thiele, 1925)
- Epitonium malcolmensis (Melvill, 1898)
- Epitonium malhaensis* (Jousseaume, 1894)
- Epitonium maraisi Kilburn, 1985
- Epitonium margarita (Jousseaume, 1912)
- Epitonium marmoratum (Sowerby II, 1844)
- Epitonium matthewsae Clench & Turner, 1952
- Epitonium melior (Melvill & Standen, 1903)
- Epitonium mellissi (E. A. Smith, 1890)
- Epitonium melvilli (Schepman, 1909)
- Epitonium millecostatum (Pease, 1861)
- Epitonium mindoroense (G. B. Sowerby II, 1844)
- Epitonium minorum (Iredale, 1936)
- Epitonium minutia (Jousseaume, 1912)
- Epitonium minuticostatum (de Boury, 1912)
- Epitonium mirabile Bozzetti, 2008
- Epitonium miserum de Boury, 1913
- Epitonium mitraeforme (G. B. Sowerby II, 1844)
- Epitonium moolenbeeki van Aartsen, 1996
- Epitonium morassii Bonfitto, 2017
- Epitonium mucronatum (Fenaux, 1943)
- Epitonium multicostatum (Sowerby, 1844)
- Epitonium multistriatum (Say, 1826)
- Epitonium mzambanum Kilburn, 1985
- Epitonium nanum (Jeffreys, 1884)
- Epitonium nautlae (Mörch, 1874)
- Epitonium nearense L. G. Brown, 2019
- Epitonium nitidella (Dall, 1889)
- Epitonium nodai Nakayama, 2000
- Epitonium novangliae (Couthouy, 1838) - New England wentletrap
- Epitonium obesum (Sowerby II, 1847)
- Epitonium obliquum (Sowerby, 1844)
- Epitonium obtusum (G. B. Sowerby II, 1844)
- Epitonium occidentale (Nyst, 1871) - fine-ribbed wentletrap
- Epitonium octagonum (G. B. Sowerby, 1905)
- Epitonium okezoko (Habe, 1961)
- Epitonium oliverioi Bonfitto & Sabelli, 2001
- Epitonium opeas Kilburn, 1985
- Epitonium oppositum (de Boury, 1921)
- Epitonium optabile (A. Adams, 1873)
- Epitonium ossium Nakayama, 2000
- Epitonium ovale (G. B. Sowerby II, 1844)
- Epitonium padangense (Thiele, 1925)
- Epitonium pallasi (Kiener, 1838)
- Epitonium pallidizonatum (Masahito, Kuroda & Habe 1971)
- Epitonium papyracea De Boury
- Epitonium parspeciosum (Iredale, 1929)
- Epitonium parvonatrix Kilburn, 1985
- Epitonium pasiphaes (Melvill, 1912)
- Epitonium paumotense (Pease, 1867)
- Epitonium perangustum (de Boury, 1913)
- Epitonium perfoliatum (Thiele, 1925)
- Epitonium perimense (Jousseaume, 1912)
- Epitonium perlucidum (Jousseaume, 1943)
- Epitonium philippinarum (Sowerby II, 1844)
- Epitonium philtatum (Watson, 1886)
- Epitonium phymanthi Robertson, 1994
- Epitonium pigrum Garcia, 2011
- Epitonium platypleurum (Verco, 1906)
- Epitonium polacia (Dall, 1889)
- Epitonium politum (Sowerby II, 1844)
- Epitonium porrectum (Hinds, 1843)
- Epitonium profundum Nakayama, 2000
- Epitonium proximum (Thiele, 1925)
- Epitonium pseudonanum Bouchet & Warén, 1986
- Epitonium psomion Kilburn, 1985
- Epitonium pteroen Kilburn, 1977
- Epitonium pulchellum (Bivona, 1832)
- Epitonium pulcherrimum (G. B. Sowerby II, 1844)
- Epitonium pupiforme (Masahito, Kuroda & Habe, 1971)
- Epitonium pyramidale (Sowerby II, 1844)
- Epitonium quiquandoni Bozzetti, 2007
- Epitonium raricostatum (Lamarck, 1822)
- Epitonium reflexum (Carpenter, 1856)
- Epitonium regulare (Carpenter, 1857)
- Epitonium repandior Kilburn, 1985
- Epitonium repandum Kilburn, 1985
- Epitonium replicatum Sowerby, 1844
- Epitonium reticulatum Lee & Wu, 1998
- Epitonium rhips (Watson, 1897)
- Epitonium rimbogai (Masahito & Habe, 1976)
- Epitonium rissoinaeforme (Melvill & Standen, 1903)
- Epitonium robillardi (Sowerby, J. de C., 1894)
- Epitonium rubrolineatum Sowerby, G.B. II, 1844
- Epitonium rupicola (Kurtz, 1860) - brown-banded wentletrap
- Epitonium sakuraii (Kuroda & Habe, 1961)
- Epitonium sallykaicherae Kilburn, 1985
- Epitonium sanctaehelenae (E. A. Smith, 1890)
- Epitonium sandwichense (Nyst, 1871)
- Epitonium santinii Bozzetti, 2007
- Epitonium savignyi Jousseaume, 1912
- Epitonium sawamurai Azuma, 1960
- Epitonium sawinae (Dall, 1903)
- Epitonium scalare (Linnaeus, 1758)
- Epitonium schepmani (Melvill, 1910)
- Epitonium schoedei (Thiele, 1925)
- Epitonium semidisjunctum (Jeffreys, 1884)
- Epitonium sericifila (Dall, 1889) - silky wentletrap
- Epitonium sexcostum (Jousseaume, 1912)
- Epitonium shyorum DuShane & McLean, 1968
- Epitonium simplex (Sowerby, 1894)
- Epitonium skoglundae DuShane, 1974
- Epitonium smithii (Tryon, 1887)
- Epitonium smriglioi Bonfitto, 2010
- Epitonium soroastrae Kilburn, 1985
- Epitonium sousai Bozzetti, 2008
- Epitonium sowerbyanum (Nyst, 1871)
- Epitonium sowerbyi Clessin, 1884
- Epitonium spyridion Kilburn, 1985
- Epitonium stigmaticum (Pilsbry, 1911)
- Epitonium striatellum (Nyst, 1871)
- Epitonium striatissimum (Monterosato, 1878) - frosted wentletrap
- Epitonium subauriculatum (S. M. Souverbie, 1866)
- Epitonium subcastum (E. A. Smith, 1899)
- Epitonium subtile (G. B. Sowerby II, 1844)
- Epitonium suprastriatum (Carpenter, 1857)
- Epitonium sykesii (Melvill & Standen, 1903)
- Epitonium symmetricum (Pease, 1867)
- Epitonium synekhes Kilburn, 1985
- Epitonium syoichiroi Masahito & Habe, 1976
- Epitonium tabogense Dall, 1917
- Epitonium tacitum (Iredale, 1936)
- Epitonium taiwanica Lee & Wu, 1998
- Epitonium tamsinae Kilburn, 1985
- Epitonium tenebrosum (Sowerby, 1903)
- Epitonium tenellum (Hutton, 1885)
- Epitonium tenerum (H. Adams, 1873)
- Epitonium tenue Gray, 1827
- Epitonium tenuicostatum (G. B. Sowerby II, 1844)
- Epitonium tenuiliratum (Sowerby II, 1874)
- Epitonium tenuipicturatum Nakayama, 2000
- Epitonium terebriforme (Thiele, 1925)
- Epitonium textimattum DuShane, 1977
- Epitonium texturatum (Gould, 1847)
- Epitonium thelcterium (Melvill & Standen, 1903)
- Epitonium thorssoni DuShane, 1988
- Epitonium thrasys (Iredale, 1936)
- Epitonium thyraeum Kilburn, 1985
- Epitonium tiberii (de Boury, 1890)
- Epitonium tiburonense Clench & Turner, 1952
- Epitonium tinctorium Dall, 1919
- Epitonium tinctum (Carpenter, 1865) - tinted wentletrap
- Epitonium tokyoense (Kuroda, 1930)
- Epitonium tollini Bartsch, 1938
- Epitonium tomlini (de Boury, 1913)
- Epitonium townsendi (Melvill & Standen, 1903)
- Epitonium trevelyanum (Thompson W., 1840)
- Epitonium trochiforme von Maltzan, 1885
- Epitonium trochoides (de Boury, 1912)
- Epitonium tryoni (de Boury, 1913)
- Epitonium tumidulum (Thiele, 1930)
- Epitonium turritellula (Mörch, 1875)
- Epitonium turtonis (Turton, 1819)
- Epitonium twilae Gittenberger, A., Goud & Gittenberger, E., 2000
- Epitonium umbilicatum (Pease, 1869)
- Epitonium unifasciatum (Sowerby II, 1844) - one-band wentletrap
- Epitonium vaillanti (Jousseaume, 1912)
- Epitonium vallatum (Jousseaume, 1912)
- Epitonium venosum (Sowerby II, 1844)
- Epitonium viaderi Fenaux, 1938
- Epitonium vittatum (Jeffreys, 1884)
- Epitonium vivens Bozzetti, 2009
- Epitonium walkerianum Hertlein & Strong, 1951
- Epitonium webbii (d'Orbigny, 1840)
- Epitonium willetti Strong & Hertlein, 1937
- Epitonium worsfoldi Robertson, 1994
- Epitonium xenicima (Melvill & Standen, 1903)
- Epitonium yamakawana Yokoyama, 1922
- Epitonium yangi L.G. Brown, 2010
- Epitonium yemenita Bonfitto, 2017
- Epitonium yokoyamai Suzuki & Ichikawa, 1936
- Epitonium zabargadense Bonfitto, 2017
- Epitonium zatrephes (Melvill, 1910)
- Epitonium zeteki Dall, 1917

Subgenera and species brought into synonymy

- Epitonium (Asperiscala) de Boury, 1909: synonym of Epitonium Röding, 1798
- Epitonium (Boreoscala) Kobelt, 1902: synonym of Boreoscala Kobelt, 1902
- Epitonium (Clathrus) : synonym of Epitonium Röding, 1798
- Epitonium (Kiiscala) Nakayama, 1995 : synonym of Cycloscala Dall, 1889
- Epitonium delicatulum (Adams H., 1869): synonym of Epitonium tenerum (H. Adams, 1873)

== See also ==
- Wentletrap, an article about the family Epitoniidae.
