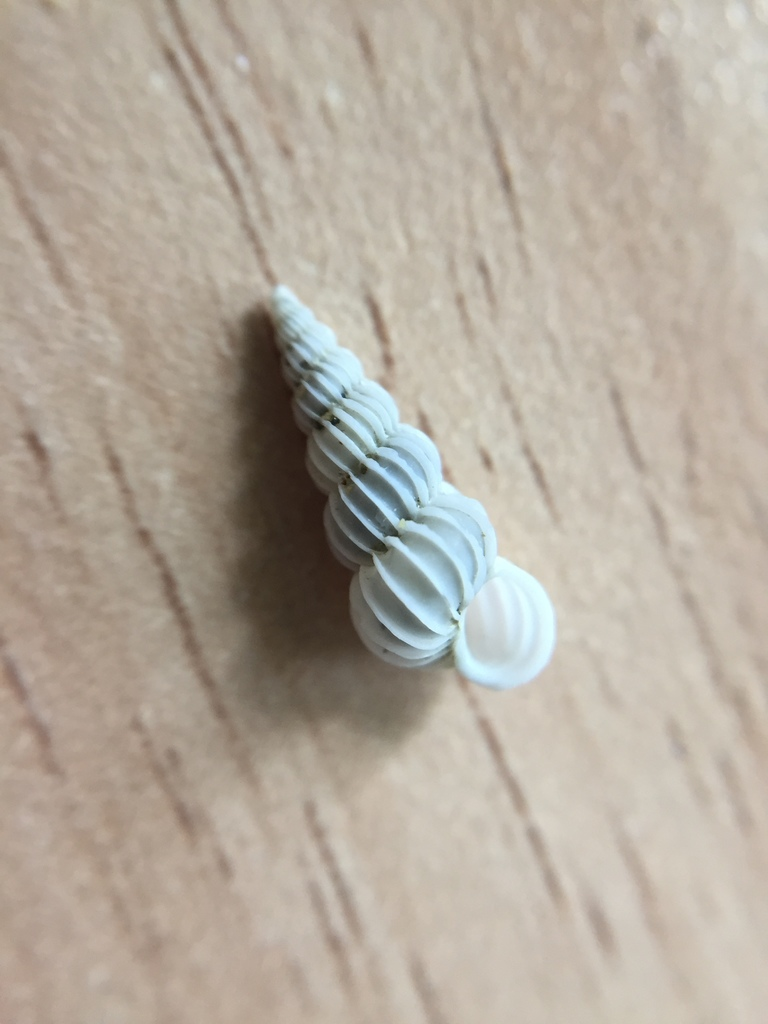

Scientific classification
- Kingdom: Animalia
- Phylum: Mollusca
- Class: Gastropoda
- Subclass: Caenogastropoda
- Order: incertae sedis
- Family: Epitoniidae
- Genus: Epitonium
- Species: E. jukesianum

Binomial name
- Epitonium jukesianum (Fosbes, 1852)

Synonyms
- Acutiscala ampacta Iredale, 1936; Acutiscala fabia Iredale, 1936; Clathrus fabia (Iredale, 1936); Clathrus wellingtonensis Kirk, 1880; Epitonium ampactum (Iredale, 1936); Epitonium delicatulum Crosse & P. Fischer, 1864; Epitonium fabia (Iredale, 1936); Epitonium wellingtonensis (Kirk, 1880); Scalaria delicatula Crosse & P. Fischer, 1864; Scalaria jukesiana Forbes, 1852

= Epitonium jukesianum =

Species of gastropod

Epitonium jukesianum is a species of very small parasitic sea snail, a marine gastropod mollusc in the family Epitoniidae, the wentletraps.

This snail is known to occur in intertidally and in shallow water in southeastern Australia and North Island, New Zealand. It is also found along the coasts of Tasmania.

It parasitises on sea anemones and can reattach itself if it gets knocked off its host. It is known to occur in high turbidity environments, but is more common in areas with moderate to low turbidity.
