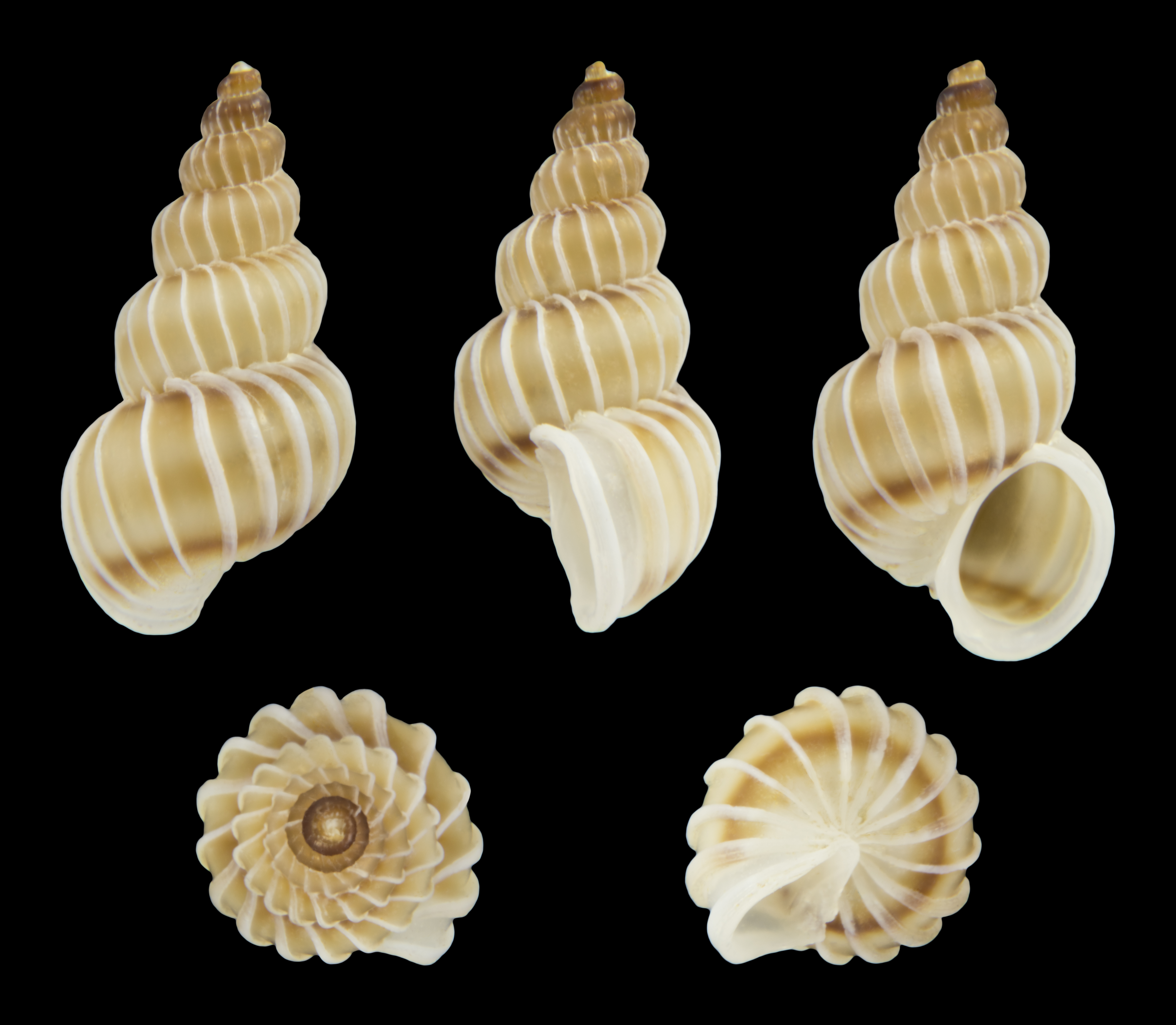
- A shell of Epitonium tenellum

Scientific classification
- Kingdom: Animalia
- Phylum: Mollusca
- Class: Gastropoda
- Subclass: Caenogastropoda
- Order: incertae sedis
- Family: Epitoniidae
- Genus: Epitonium
- Species: E. tenellum

Binomial name
- Epitonium tenellum (Hutton, 1885)

Synonyms
- Epitonium (Papyriscala) tenellum (Hutton, 1885) · accepted, alternate representation; Epitonium helicornuum (Iredale, 1936); Epitonium novoseelandiae (Clessin, 1897); Epitonium tenellum helicornuum (Iredale, 1936); Limiscala helicornuum Iredale, 1936; Limiscala lineolata (Hutton, 1873); Limiscala tenella (Hutton, 1885); Scalaria lyra Hutton, 1880; Scalaria tenella Hutton, 1885; Scalaria lineolata Hutton, 1873

= Epitonium tenellum =

Species of gastropod

Epitonium tenellum, common name the small wentletrap, is a species of small ectoparasitic sea snail, a marine gastropod mollusc in the family Epitoniidae, the wentletraps.

== Distribution ==
This snail is found in shallow water in southeastern Australia and the North Island of New Zealand.

== Description ==
The shell height varies between 10 mm and 20mm
