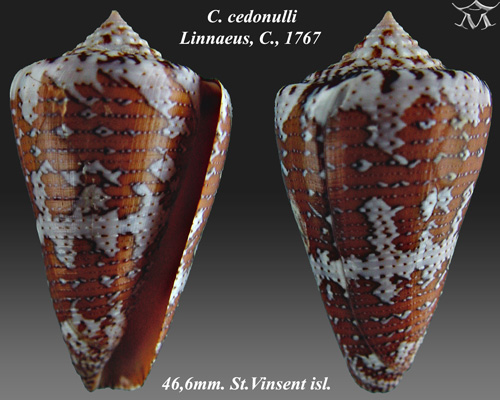
- Apertural and abapertural views of shell of Conus cedonulli Linnaeus, C., 1767

Conservation status
- Least Concern (IUCN 3.1)

Scientific classification
- Kingdom: Animalia
- Phylum: Mollusca
- Class: Gastropoda
- Subclass: Caenogastropoda
- Order: Neogastropoda
- Superfamily: Conoidea
- Family: Conidae
- Genus: Conus
- Species: C. cedonulli

Binomial name
- Conus cedonulli Linnaeus, 1758

Synonyms
- Conus (Stephanoconus) cedonulli Linnaeus, 1767 accepted, alternate representation; Conus amiralis Hwass in Bruguière, 1792; Conus amiralis var. cedonulli Linnaeus, 1767 (original rank); Conus caledonicus Hwass in Bruguière, 1792; Conus caracanus Hwass in Bruguière, 1792; Conus cedonulli insularis Gmelin, 1791; Conus cedonulli var. amiralis Hwass in Bruguière, 1792; Conus cedonulli var. caracanus Hwass in Bruguière, 1792; Conus cedonulli var. grenadensis Hwass in Bruguière, 1792; Conus cedonulli var. martinicanus Hwass in Bruguière, 1792; Conus grenadensis Hwass in Bruguière, 1792; Conus holemani Nowell-Usticke, 1968; Conus martinicanus Hwass in Bruguière, 1792; Conus nullisecundus Nowell-Usticke, 1968; Cucullus geographicus Röding, 1798; Protoconus cedonulli (Linnaeus, 1767); Tenorioconus caracanus (Hwass in Bruguière, 1792); Tenorioconus cedonulli (Linnaeus, 1767); Tenorioconus insularis (Gmelin, 1791)

= Conus cedonulli =

Species of sea snail

Conus cedonulli is a species of sea snail, a marine gastropod mollusk in the family Conidae, the cone snails and their allies.

Like all species within the genus Conus, these snails are predatory and venomous. They are capable of stinging humans, therefore live ones should be handled carefully or not at all.

Being a very varied species-complex, there has been much confusion in the course of years about which species and subspecies to assign to the Conus cedonulli-complex, hence the number of synonyms named. In 1985, D.L.N. Vink proposed assigning the following species to the Conus cedonulli-complex along with Conus cedonulli :

- Conus aurantius Hwass in Bruguière, 1792
- Conus insularis Gmelin, 1791 : considered by Vink to be a synonym of Conus aurantius Hwass in Bruguière, 1792
- Conus mappa sensu Lightfoot, 1786
- Conus sanctaemarthae spec. nov. : now synonym of Conus mappa sensu Lightfoot, 1786

The following subspecies of Conus cedonulli were recognized by the World Register of Marine Species:

- Conus cedonulli dominicanus Hwass in Bruguière, 1792: synonym of Conus dominicanus Hwass in Bruguière, 1792
- Conus cedonulli insularis Gmelin, 1791: synonym of Conus cedonulli Linnaeus, 1767

== Description ==
The color of the species in this complex is white to purplish grey although specimens from St. Vincent are very often dark-mahogany-brown, with some rare examples being 'black' or near-black. The shell is crossed by streaks that are alternately light and dark. Between these streaks, yellow, brown or dark dots occur. The operculum is small compared to the aperture and is only one seventh its size. The soft body of the animal is dark red. The size of an adult shell varies between 38 mm and 78 mm.

== Distribution ==
Locus typicus: (restricted by Vink & vonCosel) St. Vincent, Lesser Antilles.

This species occurs in the Caribbean Sea from Colombia to Trinidad, along the Lesser Antilles and along the Bahamas.

Offshore West coast Barbados, the species has been dredged at depths around 150 metres. This would seem to be the species' bathymetric maximum, since at other locations this species is usually found at much shallower depths.

== Gallery ==
Below are several color forms:

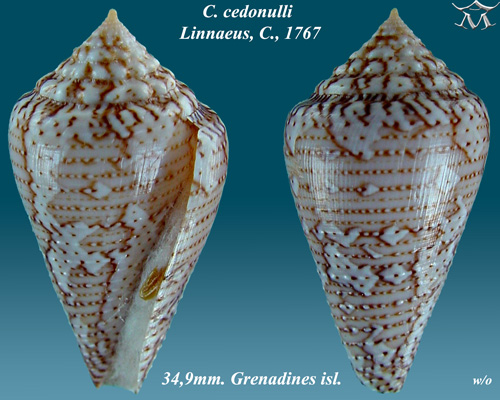
Conus cedonulli Linnaeus, C., 1767

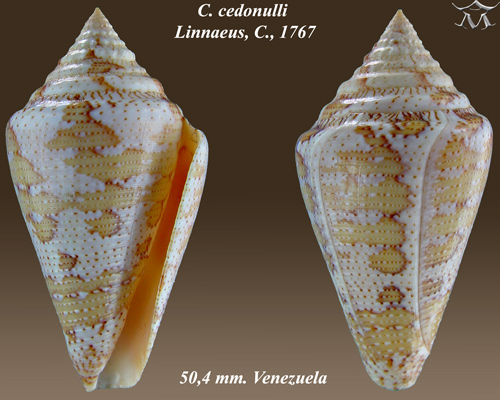
Conus cedonulli Linnaeus, C., 1767

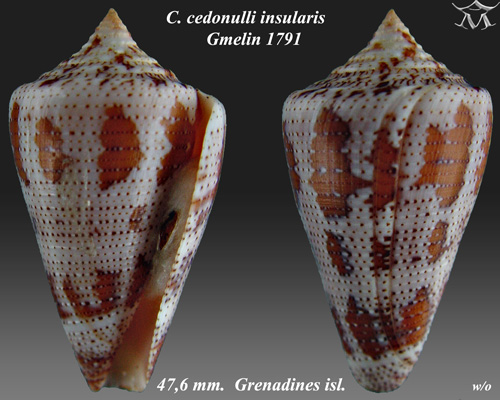
Conus cedonulli Linnaeus, C., 1767
