= Epitonium bucknilli =

Scientific classification
- Kingdom: Animalia
- Phylum: Mollusca
- Class: Gastropoda
- Subclass: Caenogastropoda
- Order: incertae sedis
- Family: Epitoniidae
- Genus: Epitonium
- Species: E. bucknilli

Binomial name
- Epitonium bucknilli Powell, 1924

Species of gastropod

Epitonium bucknilli is a species of small predatory or ectoparasitic sea snail, a marine gastropod mollusc in the family Epitoniidae, the wentletraps.

== Distribution ==
This species is known only from shallow water in northeastern New Zealand.
