= Thomas van der Wilt =

Dutch painter (1659–1733)

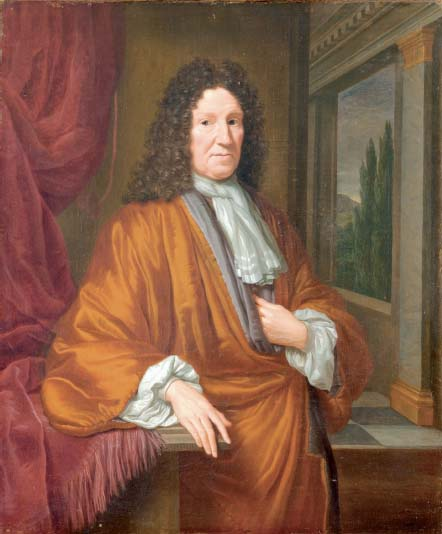
Portrait of Hendrik van Deventer

Thomas van der Wilt (1659–1733) was an 18th-century painter from the Dutch Republic.

== Biography ==
Van der Wilt was born in Piershil. Houbraken mentioned him as one of the pupils of Jan Verkolje. He became a master portrait painter in Delft, where he died.

According to the RKD he became the teacher of Jacob Campo Weyerman. He is known for portraits and historical allegories.
