= Epitonium minorum =

Scientific classification
- Kingdom: Animalia
- Phylum: Mollusca
- Class: Gastropoda
- Subclass: Caenogastropoda
- Order: incertae sedis
- Family: Epitoniidae
- Genus: Epitonium
- Species: E. minorum

Binomial name
- Epitonium minorum (Iredale, 1936)

Species of gastropod

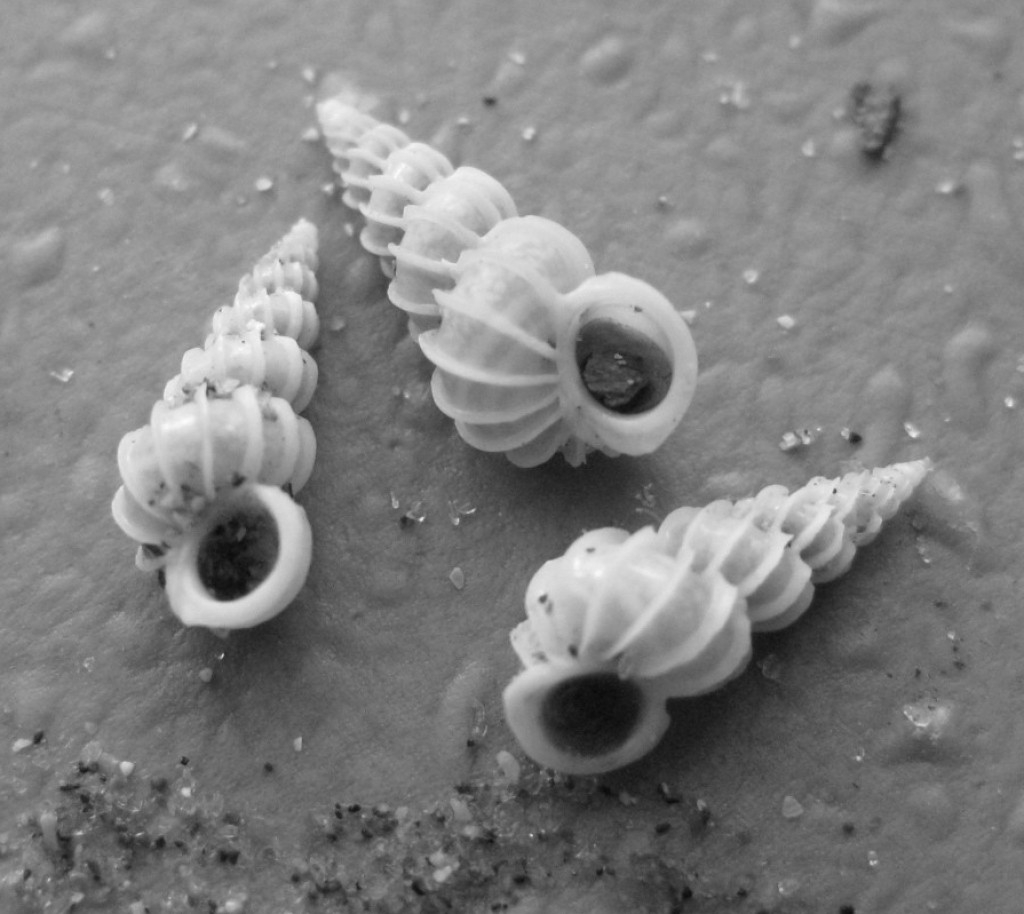
Seashells of Epitonium minorium, 1936

Epitonium minorum is a species of small predatory sea snail, a marine gastropod mollusc in the family Epitoniidae, the wentletraps. It occurs in North Island, New Zealand and in Australia.
