= Jan Verkolje =

Dutch painter (1650–1693)

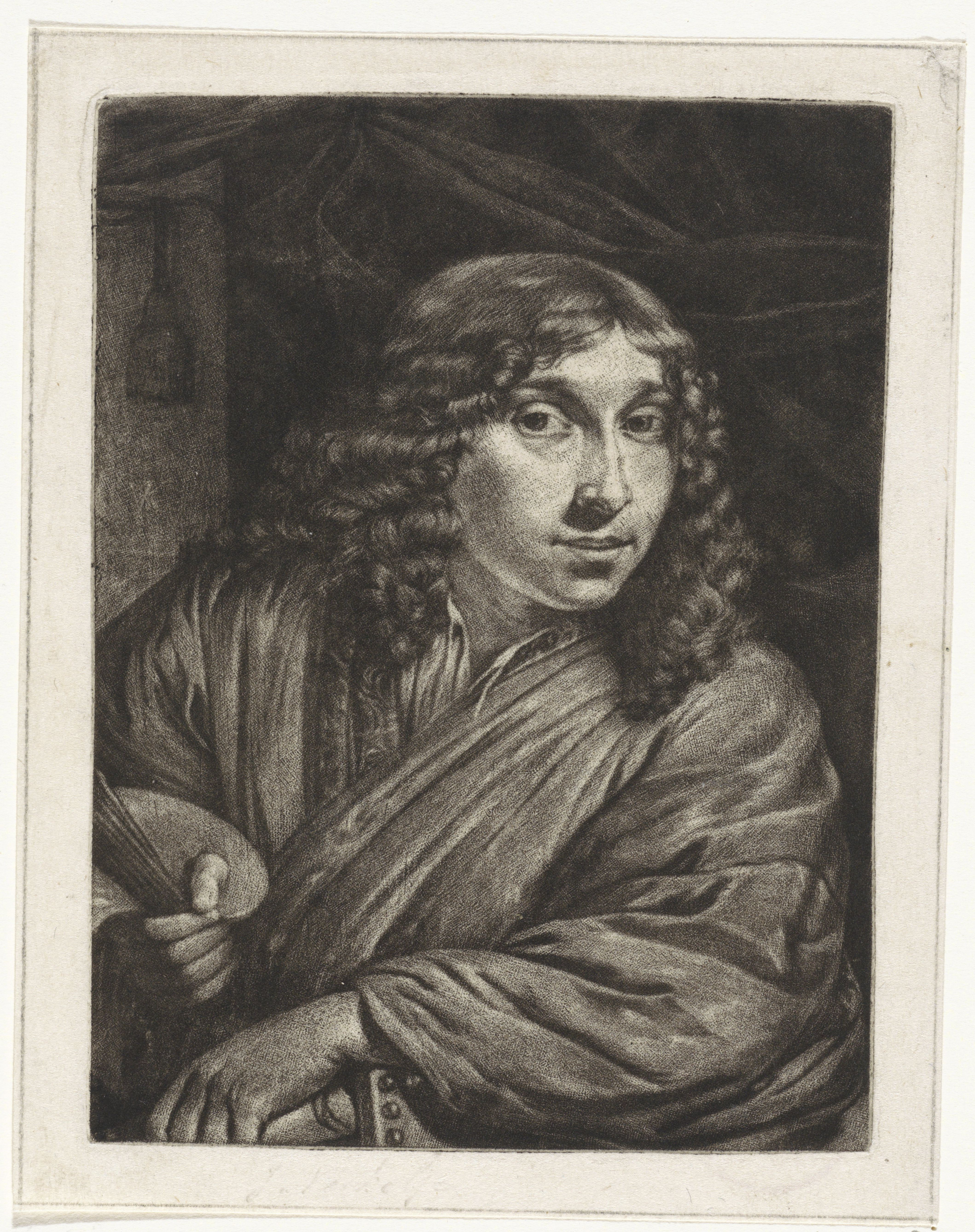
Self-portrait

Jan Verkolje or Johannes Verkolje (9 February 1650 (baptized) – 8 May 1693 (buried)) was a Dutch painter, draughtsman and engraver. He is mainly known for his portraits and genre pieces of elegant couples in interiors and, to a lesser extent, for his religious and mythological compositions. He was a gifted mezzotint artist. Trained in Amsterdam, Verkolje spent his active professional career iLien Delft where he had access to powerful patrons.

== Life ==
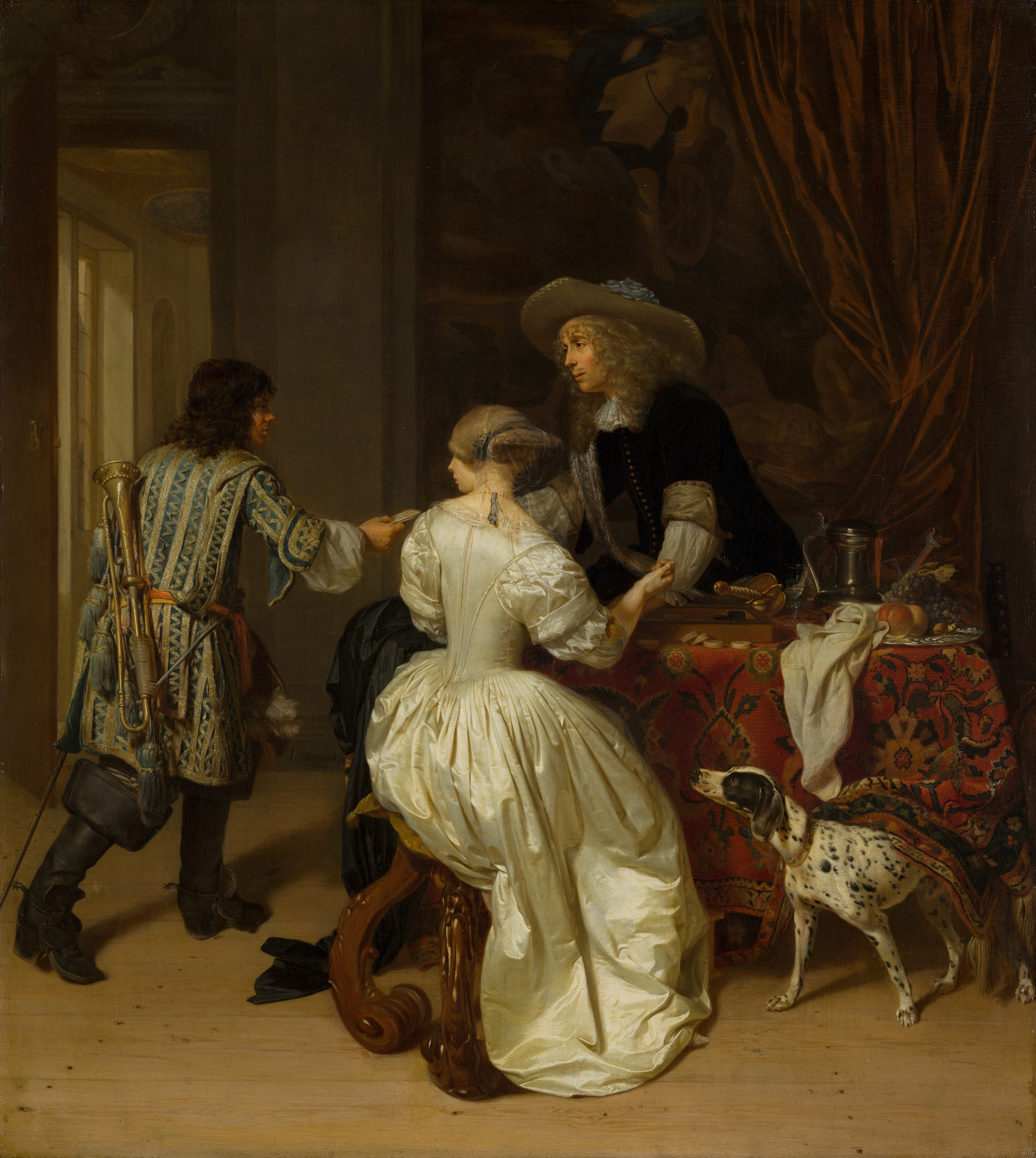
The messenger, a painting made by Verkolje in 1674

Verkolje was born in Amsterdam, the son of Benjamin Jacobsz, a locksmith, and Maria Tonnes. He was baptized in the Nieuwezijds Kapel in Amsterdam on 9 February 1659.

The early artist biographer Arnold Houbraken recounts that Verkolje was a child prodigy, who became a self-taught artist after hurting himself while playing with darts as a child. As the injury on his heel or ankle did not heal well he was bedridden for years. To while away the time, he started to copy prints. The artist Jan Gerritsz van Bronckhorst gave him high-quality prints to copy. Thus started his artistic career according to Houbraken. Subsequently, Jan studied for about half a year with Jan Andrea Lievens (1644–1680), the son of the prominent painter Jan Lievens.

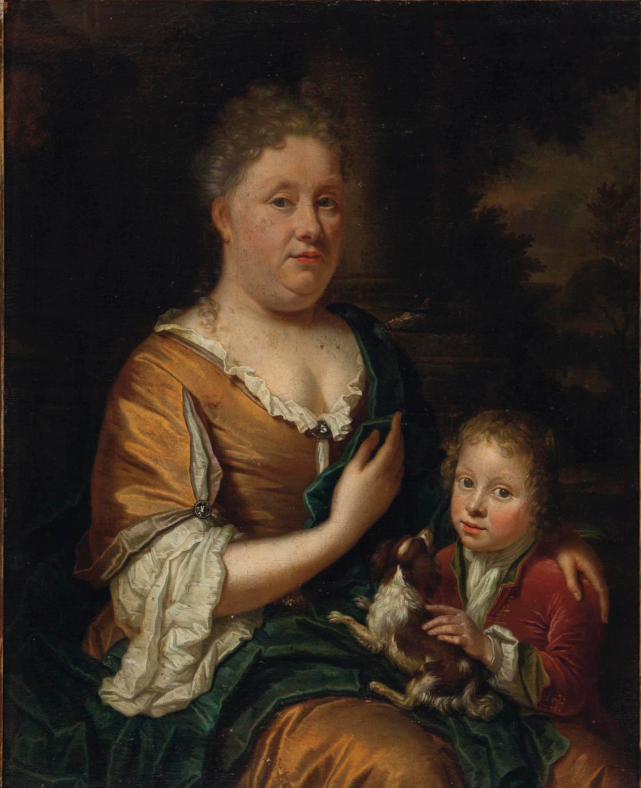
Portrait of a lady and child holding a spaniel

In 1672, the so-called rampjaar (disaster year), which was marked by a large-scale invasion of the Dutch Republic by French and other armies, Verkolje moved from Amsterdam to Delft. Here he married Judith Voorheul in October 1672. He became a member of the Guild of St. Luke of Delft in 1673 and served as its dean between 1678 and 1688. Verkolje was very successful and enjoyed the patronage of important patrons in Delft as well as the court in the Hague. As a portrait painter his only competitor in Delft was Cornelis de Man.

His sons Nikolaas Verkolje and Jan II (Delft, 1683 – Amsterdam, 1755) were trained by Verkolje as painters. Nikolaas had a successful career. Verkolje's other pupils included Albertus van der Burch, Joan van der Spriet, Willem Verschuring, and Thomas van der Wilt. In addition to these pupils, Houbraken also mentions Henrik Steenwinkel.

Verkolje died in Delft, in 1693, aged 43 when he was at the peak of his fame. He was buried in the Oude Kerk (Delft). He left a wife, three sons and two daughters.

== Work ==
=== General ===
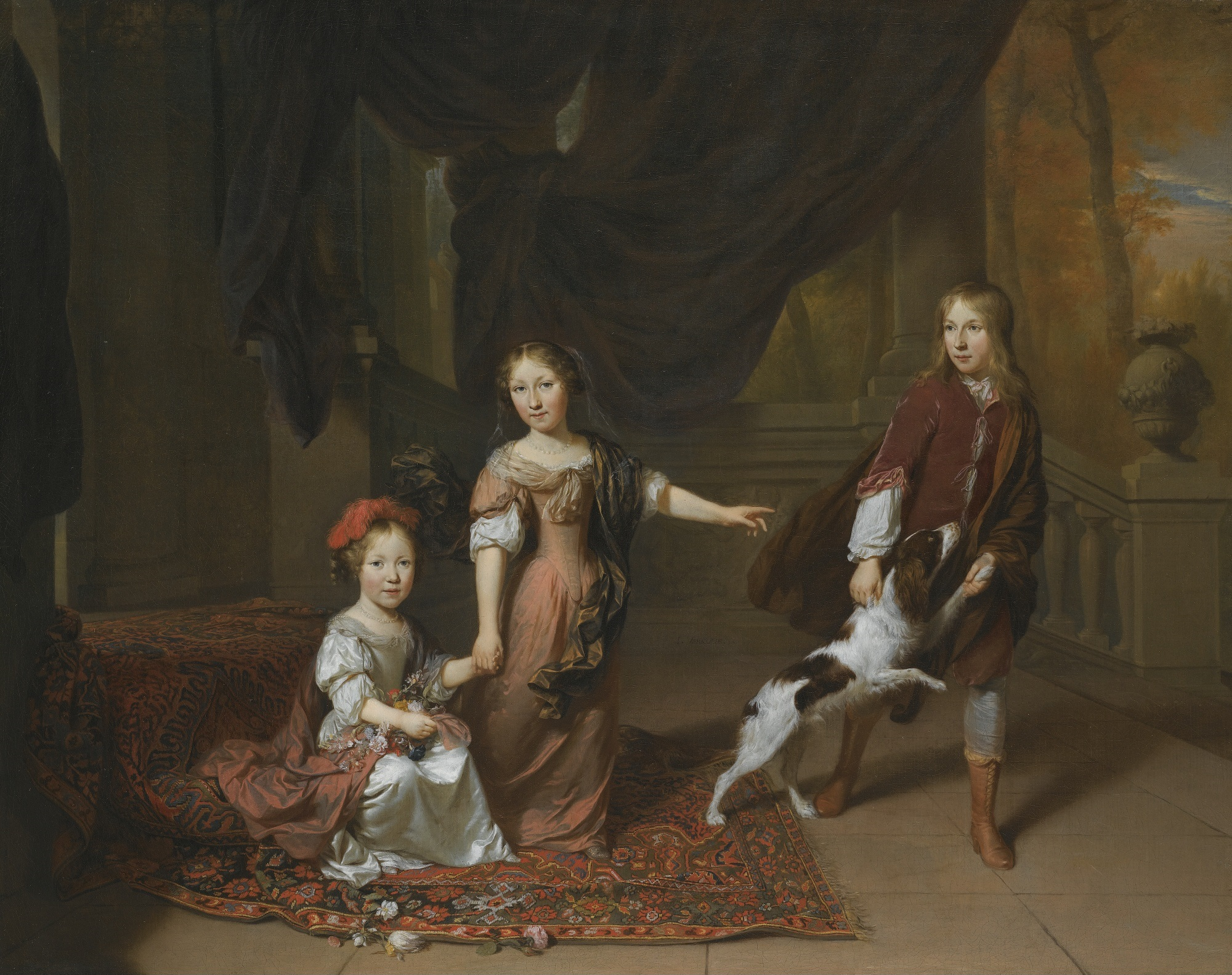
Portrait of two sisters and their brother playing with a dog

Verkolje was a versatile artist who worked as a painter, draughtsman and engraver. His subject matter was mainly portraits and genre scenes. He was also a gifted mezzotint artist, who according Houbraken, discovered the technique on his own.

=== Portrait painting ===
Verkolje was a prolific portrait artist who created portrait paintings, drawings, and prints. In his portrait work Verkolje was representative of the style then current in The Hague and Amsterdam rather than that in vogue in Delft. Verkolje was much in demand as a portraitist and was able to fetch high prices for his portraits. His sitters were a who's who of Delft society of his time: the scientist Antonie van Leeuwenhoek (whom he portrayed on canvas and in mezzotint), the prominent lawyer and bailiff Johan de la Faille and his wife (both works are in the Wadsworth Atheneum), the vicar Cornelius van Aken, the painter Pieter Jansz van Asch, and the burgomaster and historian Dirk van Bleiswijk.

Verkolje also created portrait prints of international celebrities such as Hortense Mancini, Duchess of Mazarin, King James II of England, Willem III, Prince of Orange (later William III of England), and his wife, Mary. Of these celebrity subjects, only the Delft naturalist Antonie van Leeuwenhoek was portrayed by Verkolje in a painting (Rijksmuseum, Amsterdam) as well as in a print. His other portraits were mezzotint engravings after the work of other artists, such as Peter Lely, Willem Wissing and Godfrey Kneller. Most of Verkolje's known portrait drawings were made as preparation for his paintings. These drawings focused either on particular facial features and expressions or on the whole composition.

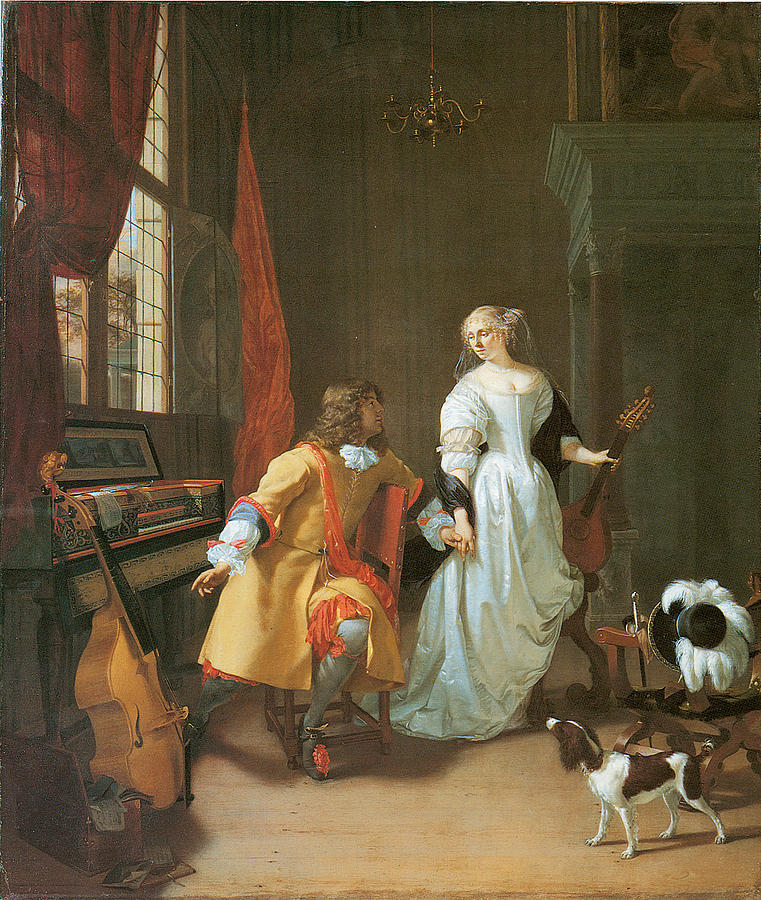
Elegant couple with musical instruments in an interior

=== Genre art ===
At the time Verkolje was active in Delft, Gerard ter Borch was the leading genre painter working in the city. Ter Borch was known for his meticulous working method which resulted in a very low output. Like other genre painters such as Gabriel Metsu and Frans van Mieris, Verkolje took advantage of the limited supply of Ter Borch genre paintings in the market by creating works that imitated the style of, or took their inspiration from, ter Borch.

Verkolje's genre paintings typically depict elegant figures in interiors engaged in music making or the playing of games. Often the protagonists are couples engaged in courtship. A dog is always present. In The messenger (1674, the Mauritshuis) Verkolje reprises the theme of the delivery of a letter, which had been treated previously by other Delft artists such as Vermeer. The Messenger shows a young couple playing backgammon in an elegant room. They have been interrupted by a regimental messenger who has entered the room to deliver a letter likely calling the young man to duty. The young couple are clearly startled by the arrival of the messenger just as is the dog in the room. The openly emotional reaction of the participants in the scene contrasts with that of the persons in Vermeer's works when receiving letters. Vermeer's figures react in a more contemplative rather than an emotional manner. Verkolje also tended to add a greater naturalness to this figures than Vermeer.

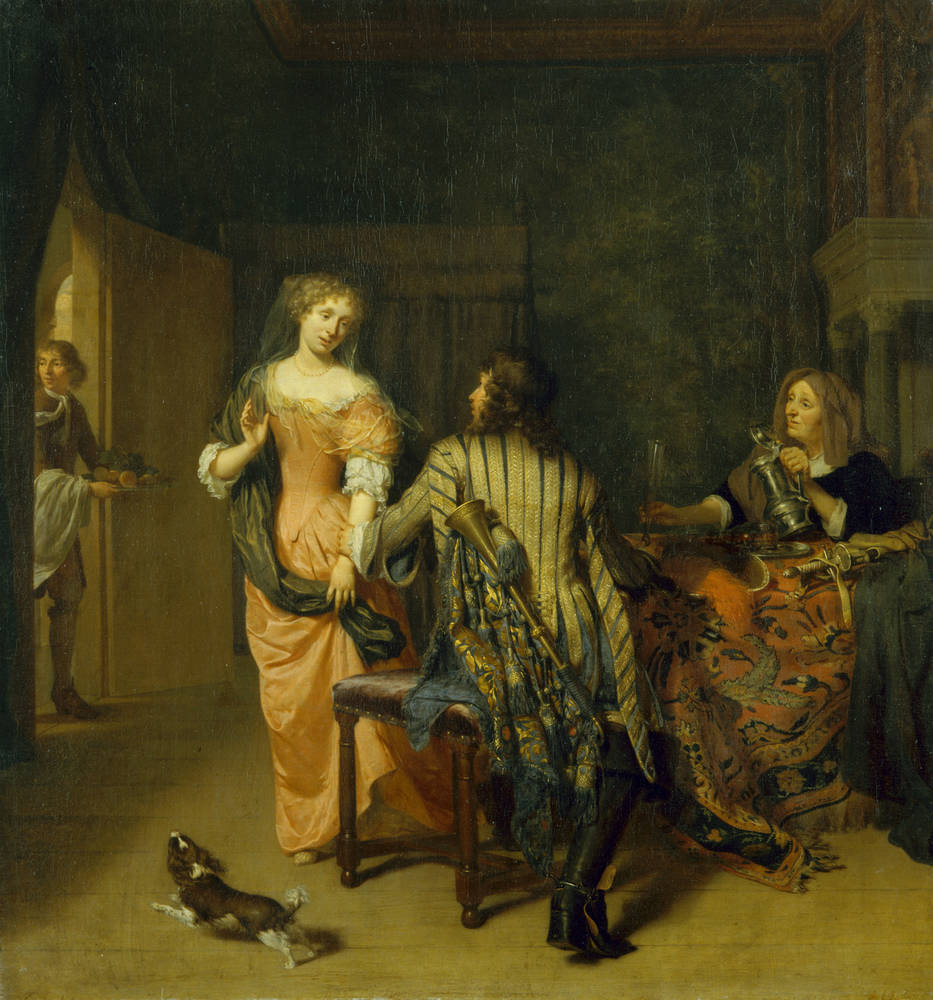
Temptation

The portraits of Verkolje often doubled as genre pieces in their extensive detail and the addition of emblematic and symbolic elements. This is clear in the double Distinguished Gentleman and Lady in an Interior (at Hoogsteder & Hoogsteder). The crossed trunks of the trees visible outside on the left and their intertwined crowns possibly symbolise the commitment to each other of the sitters while the fountain is likely an allegory of the source of life or a reference to fertility.

=== Prints ===
Jan Verkolje started engraving in 1670. The mezzotint work of Jan Verkolje shows the influence of the smoother tone developed by Abraham Blooteling. Various of his prints were made after portraits by Lely and Wissing and were printed in England even though Verkolje likely never visited England.

In addition to his portrait prints, Verkolje also produced prints of mythological scenes and genre scenes, some after Jacob Ochtervelt and Hendrick Terbrugghen. A well-known mezzotint work of Verkolje is the Venus and Adonis. It was made after a painting by Verkolje the whereabouts of which is now unknown. In the work Verkolje demonstrates his mastery of the mezzotint technique for which he was much admired in his time. He was able to render the textures of the fabrics in a very realistic manner and to visualise the softness of the clouds.
