= Joan van der Spriet =

Dutch painter

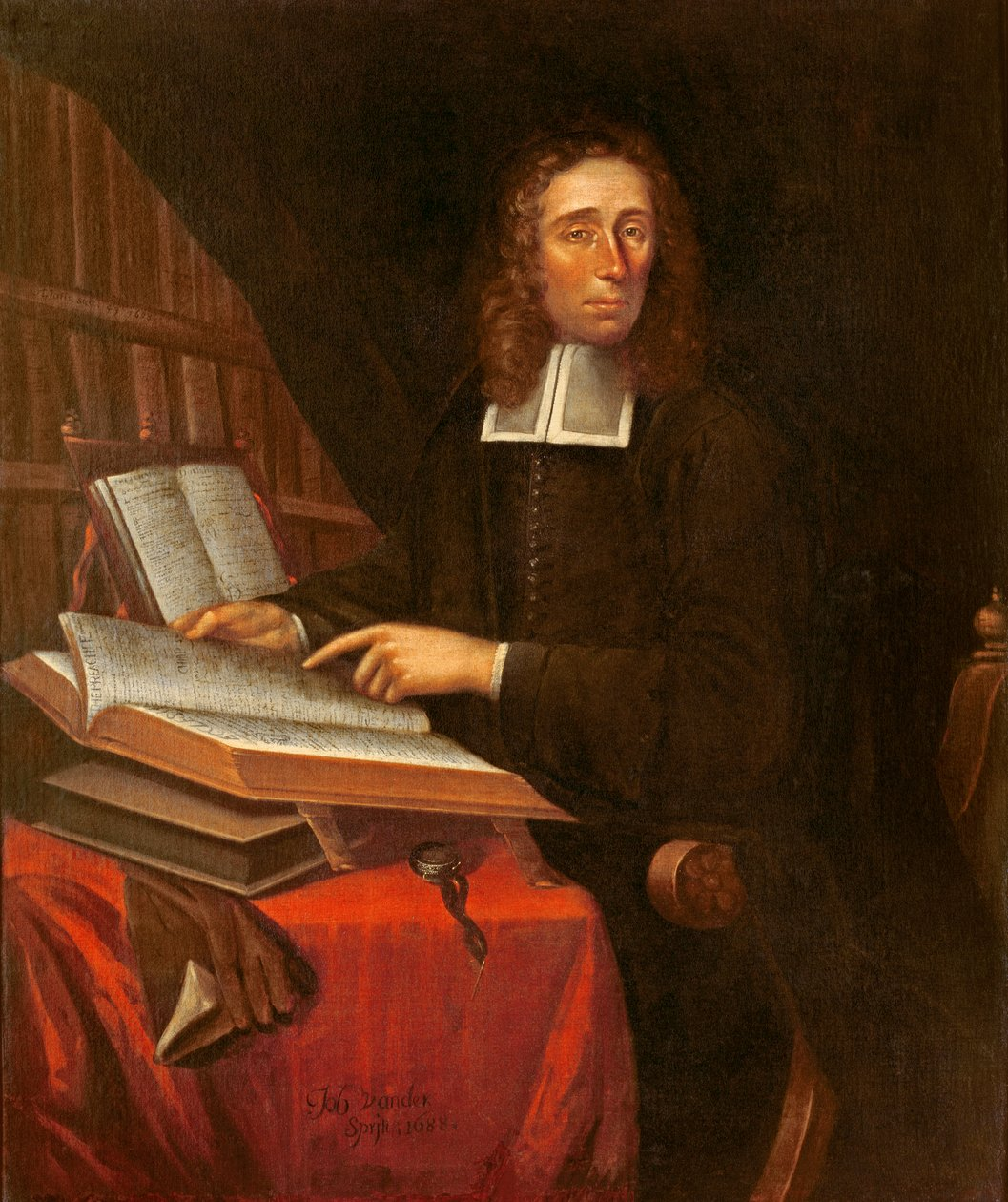
Portrait of Increase Mather, 1688

Joan van der Spriet (c. 1660 – ) was a Dutch painter who specialised in portrait painting. According to Arnold Houbraken, Spriet grew up in a Delft orphanage and became a pupil of Jan Verkolje. He was a portrait painter who moved to England and, after marrying there, settled there. According to the Netherlands Institute for Art History, Spriet was also a printmaker, but no known works survive.
