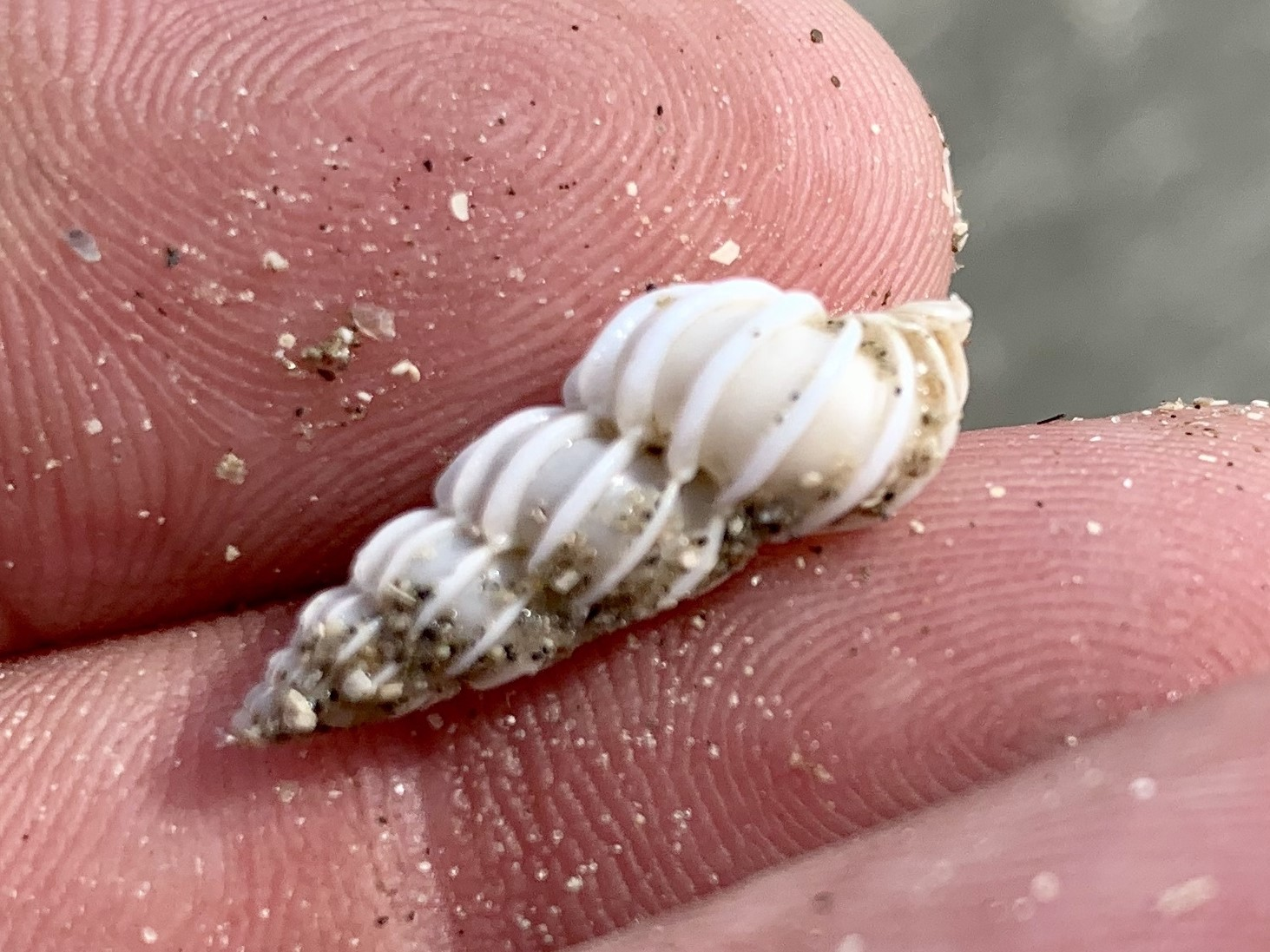

Scientific classification
- Kingdom: Animalia
- Phylum: Mollusca
- Class: Gastropoda
- Subclass: Caenogastropoda
- Order: incertae sedis
- Family: Epitoniidae
- Genus: Epitonium
- Species: E. humphreysii

Binomial name
- Epitonium humphreysii (Kiener, 1838)

Synonyms
- Scala sayana Dall, 1889; Scalaria humphreysiana G. B. Sowerby, 1873; Scalaria humphreysii Kiener, 1838

= Epitonium humphreysii =

Species of gastropod

Epitonium humphreysii, common name Humphrey's wentletrap, is a species of small predatory or ectoparasitic sea snail, a marine gastropod mollusc in the family Epitoniidae, the wentletraps.

== Distribution ==
This wentletrap occurs in the western Atlantic Ocean; it is found from Massachusetts, south throughout Florida and through the Gulf states to Mexico, and also in Brazil.

== Description ==
The maximum recorded shell length is 24 mm.

== Habitat ==
The minimum recorded depth for this species is 0 m; maximum recorded depth is 95 m.
