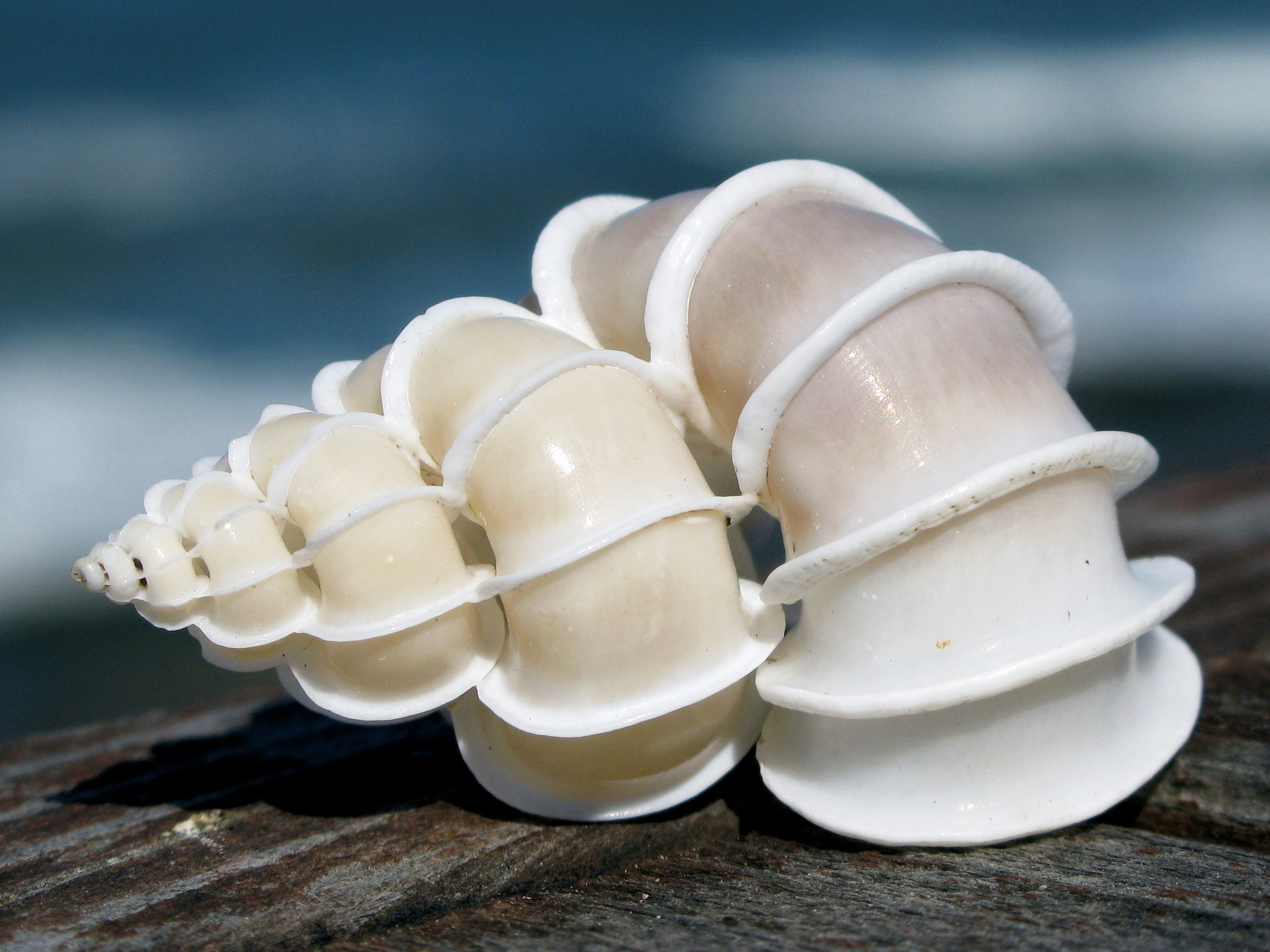
- A shell of Epitonium scalare

Scientific classification
- Kingdom: Animalia
- Phylum: Mollusca
- Class: Gastropoda
- Subclass: Caenogastropoda
- Order: incertae sedis
- Family: Epitoniidae
- Genus: Epitonium
- Species: E. scalare

Binomial name
- Epitonium scalare (Linnaeus, 1758)

Synonyms
- Epitonium breve Röding, 1798; Epitonium gradatum Grabau & King, 1929; Epitonium laevis Grabau & King, 1929; Epitonium lineatum Röding, 1798; Epitonium medium Röding, 1798; Epitonium minor Grabau & King, 1929; Epitonium multivariciferum E. A. Smith, 1911; Epitonium principale Röding, 1798; Epitonium pygmaeum Grabau & King, 1929; Epitonium subtile Grabau & King, 1929; Scala pretiosa (Lamarck, 1816); Scala scalaris (Linnaeus, 1758); Scalaria conica Lamarck, 1822; Scalaria pretiosa Lamarck, 1816; Scalaria scalaris (Linnaeus, 1758); Turbo scalaris Linnaeus, 1758

= Epitonium scalare =

Species of gastropod

Epitonium scalare, common name the precious wentletrap, is a predatory or ectoparasitic species of marine gastropod with an operculum, in the family Epitoniidae, the wentletraps.

In the 17th and 18th century this was once considered to be a very rare shell and specimens changed hands for large sums of money. Johan de la Faille and Cosimo III de' Medici owned a wentletrap.

Its habitat is subtidal in sand.

== Distribution ==
This species is distributed in the Red Sea, in the Indian Ocean along Madagascar and South Africa, in the South West Pacific Ocean and along Fiji Islands and Japan.

== Shell description ==
Adult shells of this species attain a length of between 25 mm to 72 mm.

Many Epitonium species have shells that are very attractive and quite interesting in their structure. However this species is particularly striking, partly because it is very large compared with the great majority of other species within the genus, but also because the whorls themselves do not touch and so the shell is held together only by the well-developed ribs or costae.

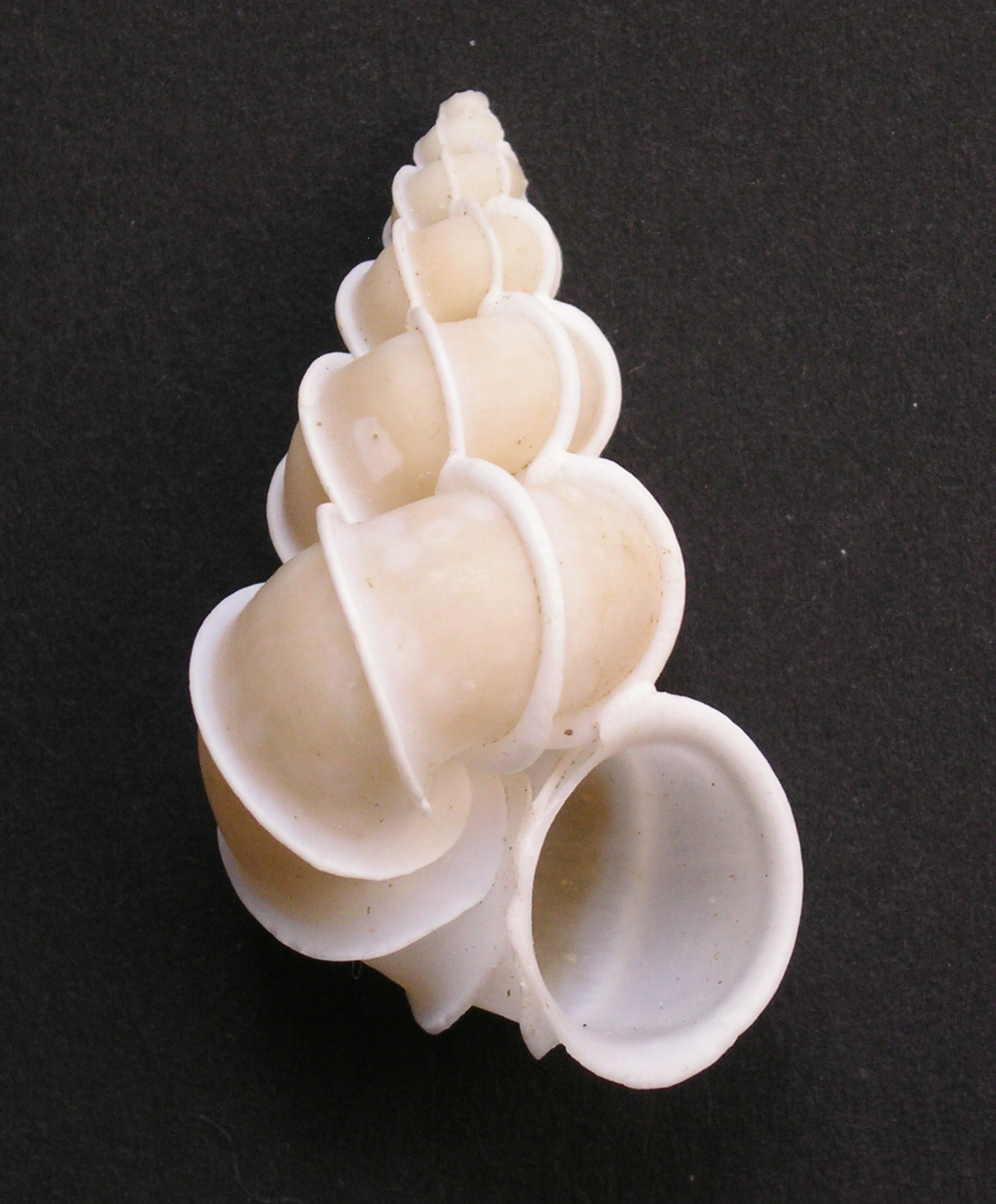

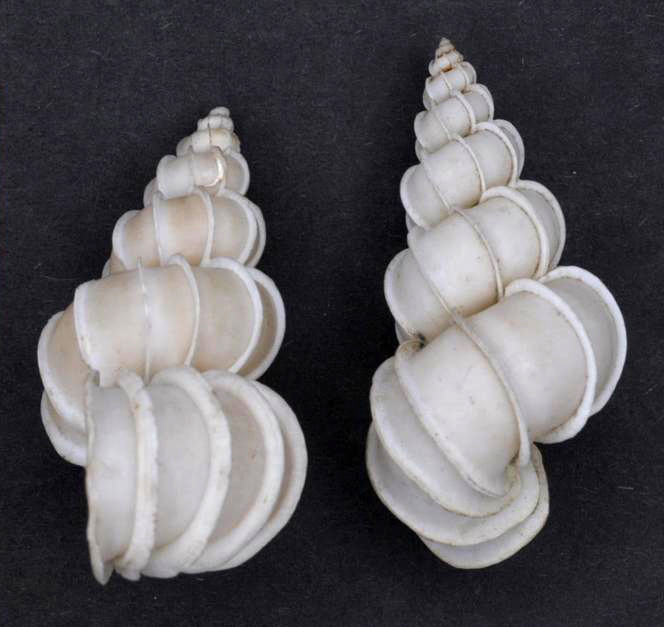

The shell of Epitonium scalare has sculpture consisting of raised ribs that are known as costae. Costae are a very common feature in shells of many Epitonium species.
