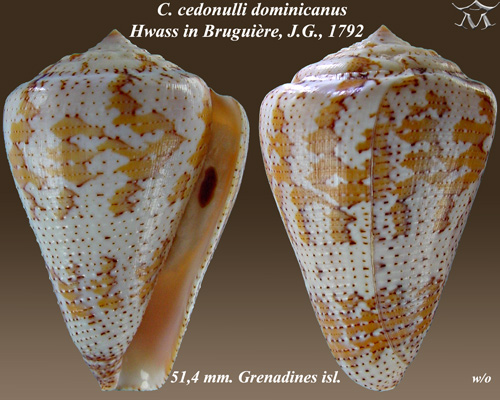
- Two views of a shell of Conus dominicanus

Scientific classification
- Kingdom: Animalia
- Phylum: Mollusca
- Class: Gastropoda
- Subclass: Caenogastropoda
- Order: Neogastropoda
- Superfamily: Conoidea
- Family: Conidae
- Genus: Conus
- Species: C. dominicanus

Binomial name
- Conus dominicanus Hwass in Bruguière, 1792

Synonyms
- Conus (Stephanoconus) dominicanus Hwass in Bruguière, 1792 accepted, alternate representation; Conus cedonulli dominicanus Hwass in Bruguière, 1792; Conus cedonulli var. dominicanus Hwass in Bruguière, 1792 (original rank); Tenorioconus dominicanus (Hwass in Bruguière, 1792)

= Conus dominicanus =

Species of sea snail

Conus dominicanus, common name the Antilles cone, is a species of sea snail, a marine gastropod mollusk in the family Conidae, the cone snails, cone shells or cones.

These snails are predatory and venomous. They are capable of stinging humans.

== Description ==
The size of the shell varies between 40 mm and 57 mm. The spire is concavely elevated, tuberculate and closely striate. It is nebulously painted with orange-brown, chestnut or chocolate and white, the latter forming usually an interrupted and irregular central band, besides being miscellaneously disposed on other parts of the surface. It is encircled by close narrow brown lines, which are sometimes slightly raised.

== Distribution ==
This marine species of cone snail occurs in the Caribbean Sea off Grenada; Grenadines.
