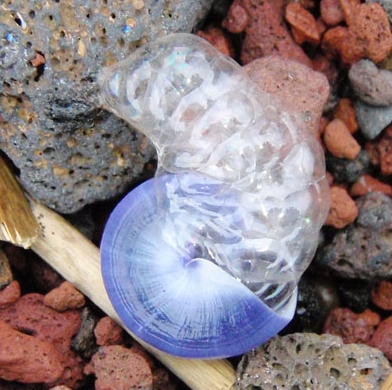
- Janthina janthina sea snail with its bubble raft, washed up on the east shore of the island of Maui

Scientific classification
- Kingdom: Animalia
- Phylum: Mollusca
- Class: Gastropoda
- Subclass: Caenogastropoda
- Clade: Hypsogastropoda
- Suborder: Ptenoglossa
- Superfamily: Janthinoidea; Lamarck 1810

Families
- Epitoniidae; Janthinidae

= Janthinoidea =

Superfamily of gastropods

Janthinoidea is a superfamily of sea snails containing wentletraps (Epitoniidae) and surfing snails (Janthinidae). It includes species that have tethered egg masses, some of which are used for flotation.

== Phylogeny ==
Molecular evidence supports a tree for Janthinoidea that shows the sequential development of traits for a neustonic life. The wentletraps (Epitoniidae) have tethered egg masses that started to be used for flotation in Recluzia and then totally divorce from its original function for the ovoviviparous Janthina janthina.

- Janthinoidea
  - - Surrepifungium
      - Surrepifungium costulatum
      - Surrepifungium ingridae
    - Epidendrium sordidum
  - - Epitonium
      - Epitonium tinctum
      - Epitonium ancillotoi
    - - - Opalia chacei
        - Cirostrema varicosa
      - Janthinidae
        - Recluzia
          Recluzia cf. jehennei
        - Janthina
          - Janthina cf. prolongata
          - - Janthina exigua
            - Janthina janthina

== Taxonomy ==
Janthinoidea includes the following families, genera, and species.

- Epitoniidae
  - Acrilla
    - Acrilla acuminata
  - Alexania
    - Alexania inazawai
  - Cirsotrema
    - Cirsotrema multiperforata
    - Cirsotrema varicosum
  - Cycloscala
    - Cycloscala crenulata
  - Epidendrium
    - Epidendrium aureum
    - Epidendrium sordidum
  - Epifungium
    - Epifungium adgranulosa
    - Epifungium adgravis
    - Epifungium adscabra
    - Epifungium hartogi
    - Epifungium hoeksemai
    - Epifungium lochi
    - Epifungium marki
    - Epifungium nielsi
    - Epifungium pseudolochi
    - Epifungium pseudotwilae
    - Epifungium twilae
    - Epifungium ulu
  - Epitonium
    - Epitonium ancillotoi
    - Epitonium angulatum
    - Epitonium clathratulum
    - Epitonium clathrus
    - Epitonium cf. jukesianum
    - Epitonium jukesianum
    - Epitonium replicatum
    - Epitonium sawinae
    - Epitonium scalare
    - Epitonium tinctum
    - Epitonium trevelyanum
  - Gyroscala
    - Gyroscala lamellosa
  - Opalia
    - Opalia chacei
    - Opalia gracilis
  - Surrepifungium
    - Surrepifungium costulatum
    - Surrepifungium ingridae
    - Surrepifungium oliverioi
    - Surrepifungium patamakanthini
- Janthinidae
  - Janthina
    - Janthina exigua
    - Janthina janthina
    - Janthina cf. prolongata CKC-2011
    - Janthina umbilicata
  - Recluzia
    - Recluzia cf. jehennei CKC-2011
