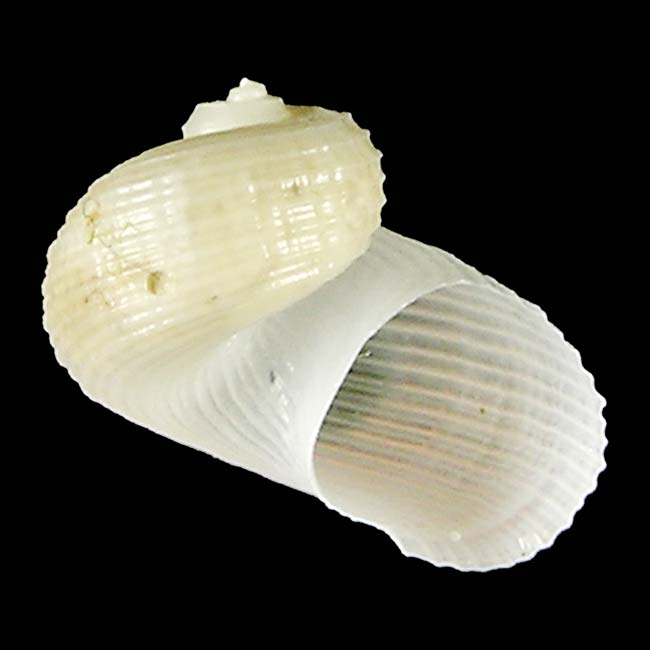
- Alora turbinata

Scientific classification
- Kingdom: Animalia
- Phylum: Mollusca
- Class: Gastropoda
- Subclass: Caenogastropoda
- Order: incertae sedis
- Family: Epitoniidae
- Genus: Alora; H. Adams, 1861

Type species
- Alora gouldii Adams, A., 1857

Species
- See text

Synonyms
- Teramachiacirsa Kuroda & Ito, 1961

= Alora (gastropod) =

Genus of gastropods

Alora is a genus of predatory sea snails, marine prosobranch gastropod mollusks in the family Epitoniidae, commonly known as wentletraps.

== Characteristics ==
(Original description) The shell is ovate-fusiform, slightly umbilicated, and thin in structure. The spire is elevated, and the whorls are convex and beautifully cancellated with elevated spiral ribs and thin lamellae. The aperture is oval and is produced in front. While the inner lip is smooth and rounded, it becomes slightly reflexed at the fore part; meanwhile, the outer lip remains simple and acute.

== Species ==
According to the World Register of Marine Species, the following species with valid names are included within the genus Alora :

- Alora annulata (Kuroda & Ito, 1961)
- Alora gouldii (A. Adams, 1857)
- Alora kiiensis Nakayama, 2000
- Alora rapunculus Kilburn, 1975
- Alora retifera Bouchet & Warén, 1986
- Alora tenerrima (Dautzenberg & H. Fischer, 1896)
- Alora turbinata Poppe, 2008

Species brought into synonymy

- Alora billeeana (DuShane & Bratcher, 1965) : synonym of Epidendrium billeeanum (DuShane & Bratcher, 1965)
- Alora insignis (Pilsbry & Lowe, 1932): synonym of Alora gouldii (A. Adams, 1857)
- Alora kiiensis T. Nakayama, 2000; synonym of Tuba kiiensis (T. Nakayama, 2000) (original combination)
- Alora reticulata (Habe, 1962): synonym of Foratiscala reticulata (Habe, 1962)
