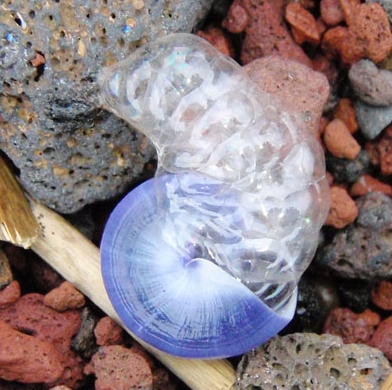
- A freshly stranded individual of Janthina janthina in the Janthinidae, Epitonioidea

Scientific classification
- Domain: Eukaryota
- Kingdom: Animalia
- Phylum: Mollusca
- Class: Gastropoda
- Subclass: Caenogastropoda
- Clade: Hypsogastropoda
- Suborder: Ptenoglossa; Gray, 1853

Superfamilies
- Eulimoidea; Janthinoidea; Triphoroidea

= Ptenoglossa =

Suborder of gastropods

The Ptenoglossa is an informal taxonomic group of sea snails. This group was considered paraphyletic or polyphyletic by Ponder and Lindberg (1997) in their classification of gastropod molluscs.

The database WoRMS considers this suborder as belonging to the order (unassigned Caenogastropoda) (temporary name).

== Taxonomy ==
- Superfamily Epitonioidea
  - Family Epitoniidae
  - Family Janthinidae
  - Family Nystiellidae
- Superfamily Eulimoidea
  - Family Eulimidae
  - Family Aclididae
- Superfamily Triphoroidea
  - Family Triphoridae
  - Family Cerithiopsidae
  - Family Newtoniellidae
