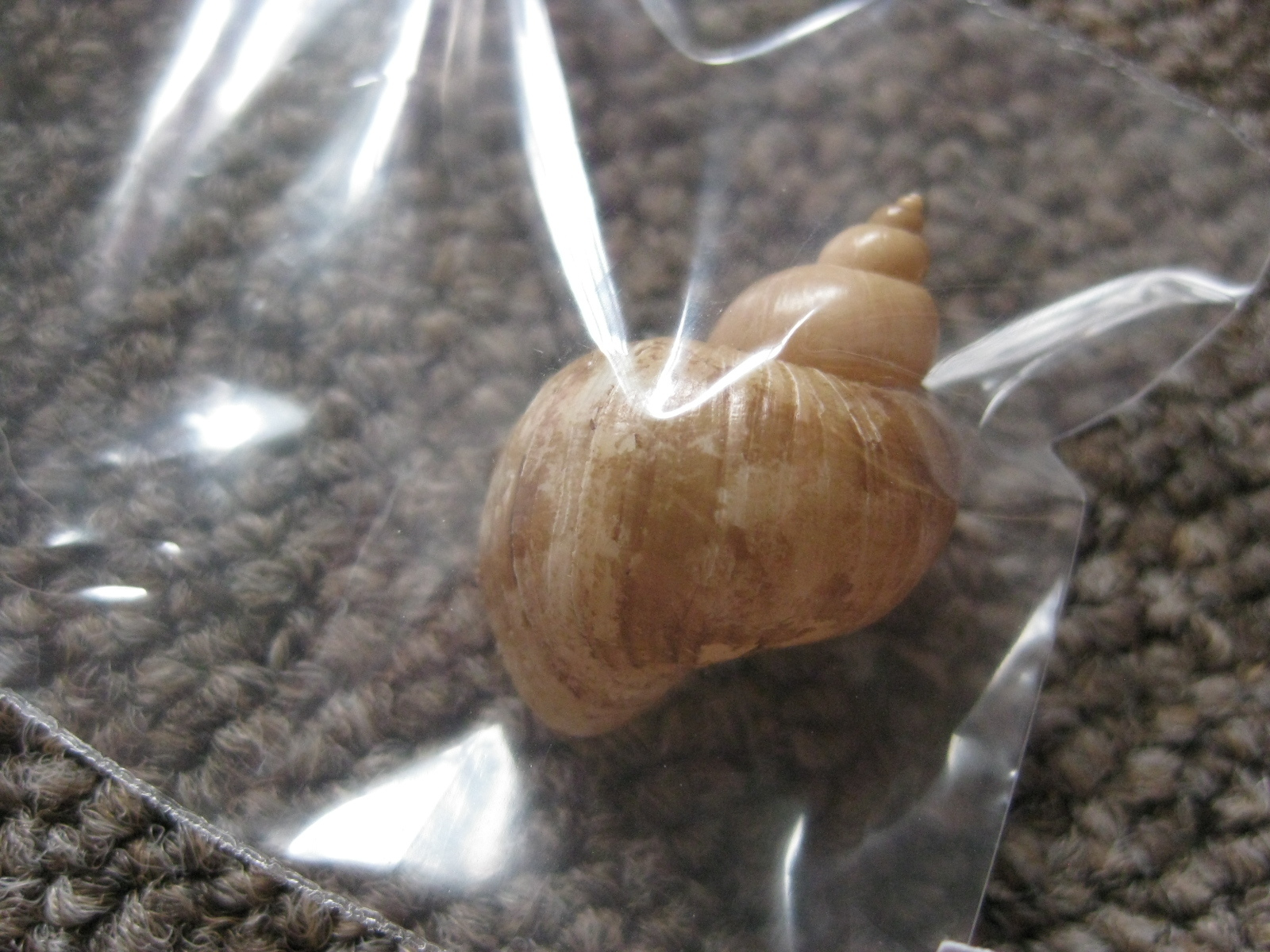
- Recluzia lutea

Scientific classification
- Kingdom: Animalia
- Phylum: Mollusca
- Class: Gastropoda
- Subclass: Caenogastropoda
- Order: incertae sedis
- Superfamily: Epitonioidea
- Family: Epitoniidae
- Genus: Recluzia; Petit de la Saussaye, 1853

Type species
- Recluzia jehennei Petit de la Saussaye, 1853

Species
- See text

= Recluzia =

Genus of gastropods

Recluzia is a genus of neustonic sea snails, marine gastropod molluscs in the family Epitoniidae, which also includes the convergently neustonic Janthina. These uncommon, yellow-brownish snails are known principally from the Indo-West Pacific province and northern Indian Ocean, though Recluzia lutea can also be found rarely in the east Pacific and Atlantic oceans.

Despite the various convergent traits between Recluzia and Janthina, they seem to have evolved to their neustonic habit independently, with the former likely being most closely related to Alexania, for their shell characteristics, or Surrepifungium and Epidendrium, for their tissue coloration, while the latter is likely most close to Alora, especially Alora terrenima for its shell's resemblance to early janthinid fossils'. Further differing them from the violet snails, Recluzia have unforked cephalic tentacles, proportionally smaller heads and snouts, teleoconch-parallel protoconch coiling axis, thinner, longer, spineless egg casings, taller shell spires and retained statocysts as adults. Furthermore, they lack epipodia, free-swimming larvae with proto-floats, which instead adhere to the parent's float, one of the protoconch II whorls, having 2.2 instead of 3.2 whorls, shell outer lip sinuses and ianthinin glands.

== Description ==
=== Shell ===
The shells of this genus have anywhere from 4.5 to 7 whorls.

== Species ==
- Recluzia johnii (Holten, 1802)
- Recluzia lutea (Bennett, 1840)

Species brought into synonymy

- Recluzia annamitica Wattebled, 1886
- Recluzia aperta Jeffreys, 1859: synonym of Torellia vestita Jeffreys, 1867: synonym of Torellia delicata (Philippi, 1844)
- Recluzia bensoni A. Adams, 1861: synonym of Recluzia lutea (Bennett, 1840)
- Recluzia effusa Thiele, 1928: synonym of Recluzia lutea (Bennett, 1840)
- Recluzia erythraea Jickeli, 1882: synonym of Recluzia johnii (Holten, 1802)
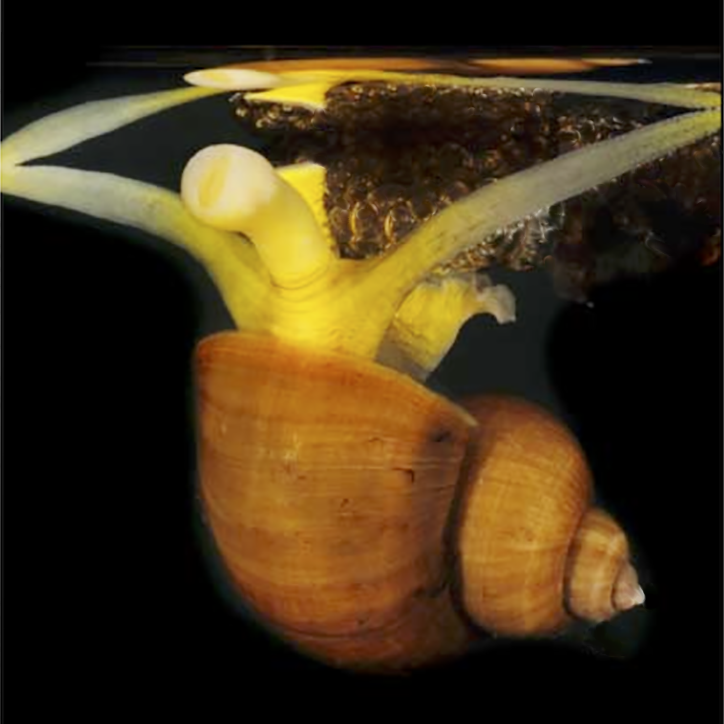
- Recluzia globosa E. A. Smith, 1876: synonym of Recluzia lutea (Bennett, 1840)
- Recluzia hargravesi Cox, 1870: synonym of Recluzia johnii (Holten, 1802)
- Recluzia insignis Pilsbry & Lowe, 1932: synonym of Alora gouldii (A. Adams, 1857)
- Recluzia jehennei Petit, 1853: synonym of Recluzia lutea (Bennett, 1840)
- Recluzia montrouzieri Souverbie, 1871: synonym of Recluzia lutea (Bennett, 1840)
- Recluzia palmeri (Dall, 1871): synonym of Recluzia lutea (Bennett, 1840)
- Recluzia rollandiana Petit de la Saussaye, 1853: synonym of Recluzia lutea (Bennett, 1840)
