= J. laeta =

J. laeta may refer to:

- Janthina laeta, a violet snail
- Josa laeta, an anyphaenid sac spider
