= Lip (gastropod) =

Mollusc shell

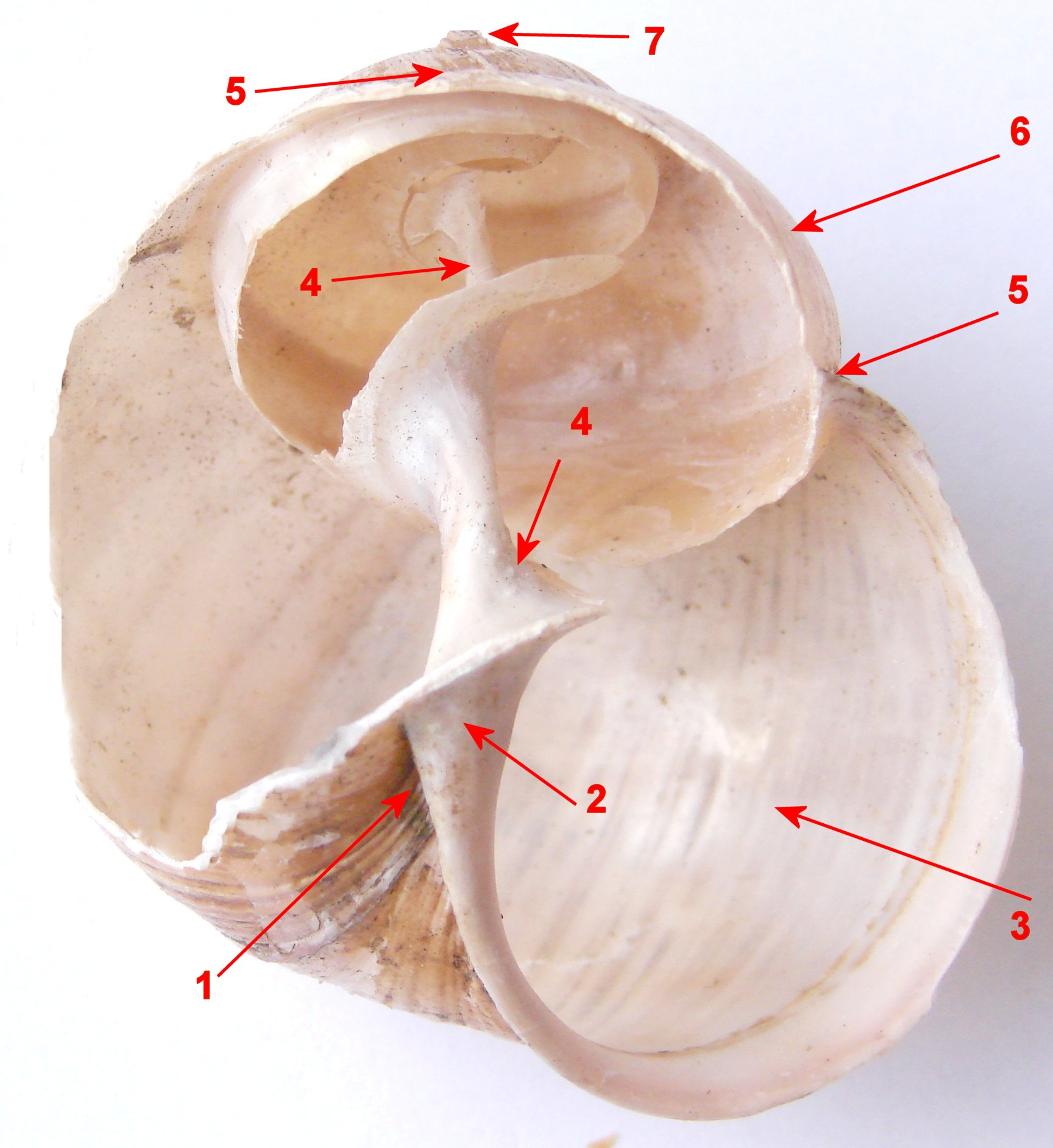
A shell of Helix pomatia with part of shell removed; the outer lip and the inner lip are clearly visible

In the shell of gastropod mollusks (a snail shell), the lip is the free margin of the peristome (synonym: peritreme) or aperture (the opening) of the gastropod shell.

In dextral (right-handed) shells (most snail shells are right-handed), the right side or outer side of the aperture is known as the outer lip (labrum). The left side of the aperture is known as the inner lip or columellar lip (labium) if there is a pronounced lip there. In those species where there is no pronounced lip, the part of the body whorl that adjoins the aperture is known as the parietal wall.

The outer lip is the edge of the aperture, which can be thin (acute), thickened, or flared. This outer lip is the actual edge of the aperture that is actively deposited by the mantle margin during growth. The outer lip is usually thin and sharp in immature shells, and in some adults (e.g. the land snails Helicella and Bulimulus). However, in some other land snails and in many marine species the outer lip is thickened (also called callused), or reflected (turned outwards). This gives a varix: the thickened, flared (as in Cypraea or Bursa, or reflected (as in some Strombus) final margin that is often laid down when the snail reaches its adult size and stops growing. This varix is therefore an important indicator of the shell's developmental stage.

In some other marine species it is curled inwards (inflected), as in the cowries such as Cypraea. It can also be expanded, as in Strombus; it can have finger-like processes (digitate) or it can be fringed with spines (foliated), as in Murex.

The lip is called emarginate when it is incised or slit, as in Pleurotomaria. It is described as effuse when the basal or anterior extremity is slightly produced, depressed or reflected, as in Thiara. When the lip is bent into an "s" curve it is called sinuous, as is the case in the sigmoidal margin of Janthina exigua.

Interiorly when the lip has teeth it is dentate as in Nerita. When the teeth are rib-like it is described as plicate or lamellate. When it has numerous large plications, nodules or teeth it is known as ringent, as in Pythia. The lip is called sulcate, when it is grooved within. It is known as labiate or marginate, when it is callously thickened near the margin.

The varices, denticles (teeth), or severe narrowing of the lip defend the animal against shell-peeling predators like crabs. A thick, narrow lip also restricts access to the snail's soft tissues when it withdraws into the shell.
