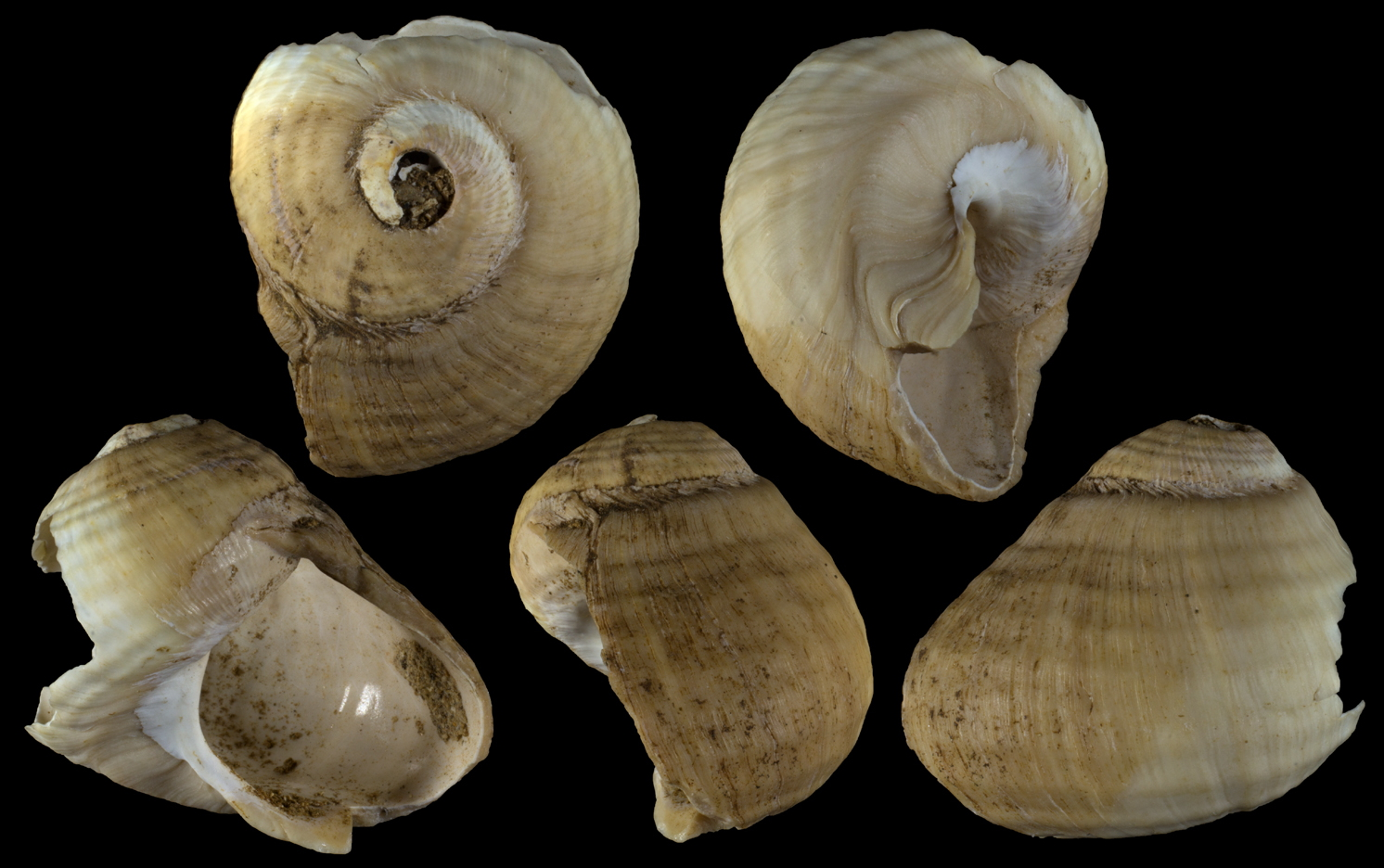
- Shell of † Jathina typica (specimen at MNHN, Paris)

Scientific classification
- Kingdom: Animalia
- Phylum: Mollusca
- Class: Gastropoda
- Subclass: Caenogastropoda
- Order: incertae sedis
- Superfamily: Epitonioidea
- Family: Epitoniidae
- Genus: Janthina
- Species: †J. typica

Binomial name
- †Janthina typica (Bronn, 1861)

Synonyms
- † Acrybia (Hartungia) chouberti Chavan, 1951; † Acrybia chouberti Chavan, 1951; † Acrybia (Heligmope) dennanti (Tate, 1893); † Eunaticina abyssalis Simone, 2014; † Hartungia dennanti (Tate, 1893); † Hartungia elegans Tomida & Nakamura, 2001; † Hartungia typica Bronn, 1861 (superseded combination); † Heligmope dennanti Tate, 1893 (junior subjective synonym); † Janthina hartungi Mayer, 1864 (junior subjective synonym); † Turbo postulatus Bartrum, 1919 (junior subjective synonym)

= Janthina typica =

Species of gastropod

Janthina typica is an extinct species of holoplanktonic sea snail, a marine gastropod mollusk in the family Epitoniidae, the violet snails or purple storm snails.

== Distribution ==
Fossils of this marine species were found in the Azores and also in Pliocene strata in Victoria, Australia.
