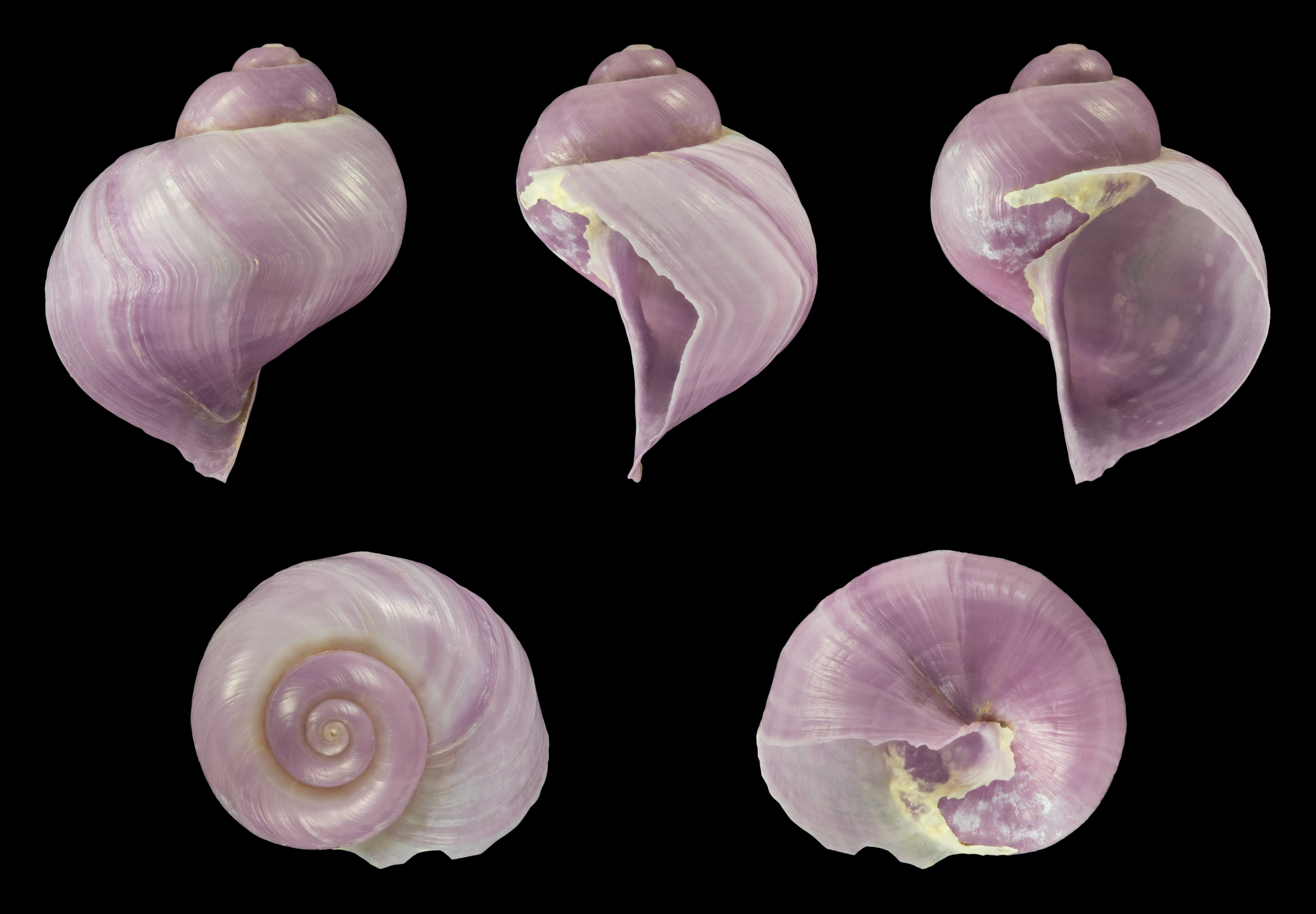
- Jathina globosa shells

Scientific classification
- Kingdom: Animalia
- Phylum: Mollusca
- Class: Gastropoda
- Subclass: Caenogastropoda
- Order: incertae sedis
- Superfamily: Epitonioidea
- Family: Epitoniidae
- Genus: Janthina
- Species: J. globosa

Binomial name
- Janthina globosa Swainson, 1822

Synonyms
- Amethistina laeta Monterosato, 1884; Janthina decollata Carpenter, 1857; Janthina elongata [sic] (error for prolongata Blainville, 1822 in Maravigna (1838)); Janthina iricolor Reeve, 1858; Janthina laeta (Monterosato, 1884); Janthina nitens Menke, 1828; Janthina nitens var. atlantica Mörch, 1860; Janthina nitens var. minor Monterosato, 1878; Janthina pallida var. minor Monterosato, 1878; Janthina patula Philippi, 1844; Janthina payraudeaui Locard, 1901; Janthina prolongata Blainville, 1822; Janthina rosea Anton, 1838; Janthina splendens Monterosato, 1884

= Janthina globosa =

Species of gastropod

Janthina globosa is a species of holoplanktonic sea snail, a marine gastropod mollusk in the family Epitoniidae, the violet snails or purple storm snails.

== Anatomy and morphology ==
Janthina globosa, commonly referred to as the violet snail, is a neustonic organism characterized by its thin, fragile purple shell and large size The maximum recorded shell length is 38.5 mm. Females normally grow to larger sizes than males, making it easy to distinguish between the sexes. Janthina globosa has a glossy shell, characterized by four symmetrical spirals evenly spaced on its shell. Inside its shell lives the organism itself. Protected by its hard outer shell, Janthina globosa has a soft body with forked cephalic tentacles on its belly, used for many different things like locomotion and receiving sensory input. Its unique purple color serves to camouflage itself in its environment and also serves as an efficient means of obtaining food, making it a better predator. Its epipodium, like those of numerous other Janthina species, is thought to aid in maintaining equilibrium in the water (Wilson and Wilson, 1956, 301).

== Feeding and preferred prey ==
It secretes a purple dye (the same dye that gives it its purple color) to paralyze its prey, allowing it to eat its target without much of a fight. Although Janthina globosa seems like a harmless snail, it is an incredibly successful predator. Its most popular prey, based on scientific observation, seems to be Velella (Wilson and Wilson, 1956, 301) . Although scientists have observed that Velella is its favored prey option, upon gut analysis it seems that Janthina globosa will eat just about anything, even exhibiting cannibalistic behaviors by eating members of its own species.

Velella has stinging nematocysts that they use to defend themselves and to capture prey. Janthina globosa are able to tolerate the poison excreted from Velella's nematocysts, making them an easy target for predation by Janthina globosa. Unlike many other marine animals, Janthina globosa's diet does not change too much as it matures. Janthina globosa seems to prefer larger Velella over smaller bodied Velella due to the availability of more soft tissue to eat as compared to the smaller members of that species. Since Velella is their preferred prey, Janthina globosa will appear in places it is not normally found if there is a large amount of Velella prey to consume. This makes the population size of Velella a good predictor of Janthina globosa location and population size (Deudero S, Pinnegar J, Polunin N. 2002).

== Distribution and habitat ==
Four other species that fall in the genus Janthina can be found in the Mediterranean Sea (along with Janthina globosa) but they are also found between these latitudes: 50°N and 40°S. If conditions permit it, these snails can be found outside these latitudes. Strandings of this species and others of its genus are also due to wave and current movements (F. Betti et al 2017). Minimum recorded depth is 0 m. Maximum recorded depth is 13 metres (43 ft).

== Taxonomy ==
Janthina globosa was first captured in 1822 off the Gulf of Antalya in the Northeastern part of the Mediterranean Sea (Teker S, Gökoğlu M, Julian D. 2017). The oldest fossil of the Janthina genus was found on Santa Maria Island in the Atlantic, but the earliest record of Janthina globosa specifically is unclear, despite its long fossil record (Record of the Australian Museum, 2017, 142). Many other species fall in the genus Janthina. J. globosa most likely evolved from the species J. krejcii, but it looks more like J. pallida (Record of the Australian Museum, 2017, 160–161). It is thought that Janthina globosa was used as a source of purple dye for clothes in ancient times.

== Behavior ==
This species lives its life upside down attached to air bubbles that it made itself, forming a self-made float. These air bubbles are produced by a specialized organ called the propodium. This organ sucks air from above the surface of the water to create a bubble. It then coats it with a covering of mucus before adding it to the bottom of the float. It is further adhered to the float with more mucus to ensure it is secure. This bubble making process has been timed and it took one organism of the Janthina genus about a minute to completely form one bubble (Wilson and Wilson, 1956, 300). This mechanism of staying afloat is almost entirely unique to the Janthina genus, with the one exception being the Recluzia. Janthina globosa is not restricted to living in the open ocean; they can also live in enclosed bays if the weather conditions allow them to.

== Reproduction ==
Janthina globosa is hermaphroditic and reproduces sexually. This means that it does not stay as the sex that it was at birth but begins life as a male, and then exhibits a cycle of protandry, where it morphs into a female in order to reproduce. It does this by laying pale pink eggs on the underside of its float, where they stay attached until they hatch later on in their development (Wilson and Wilson, 1956, 302).

== Gallery ==
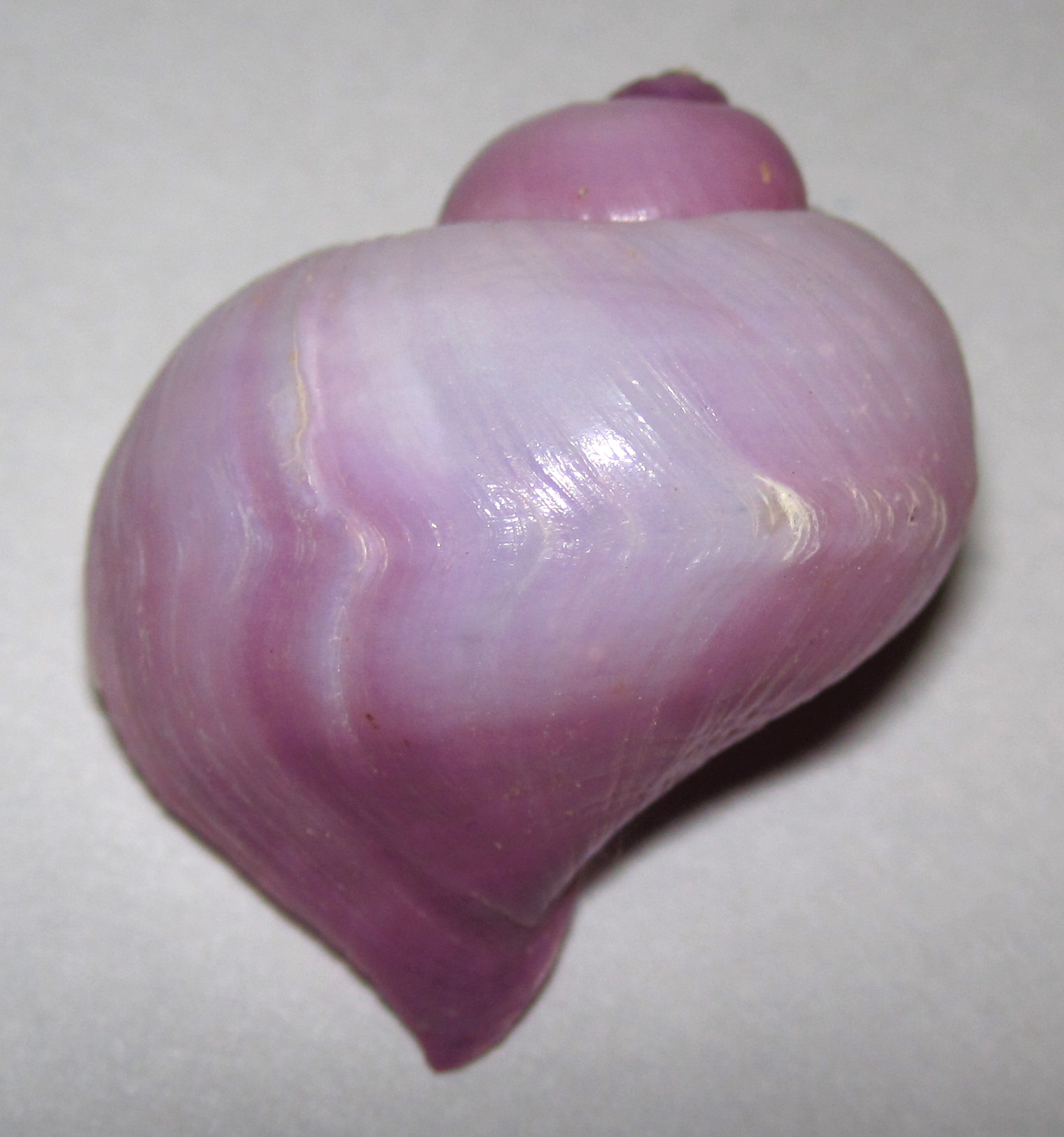

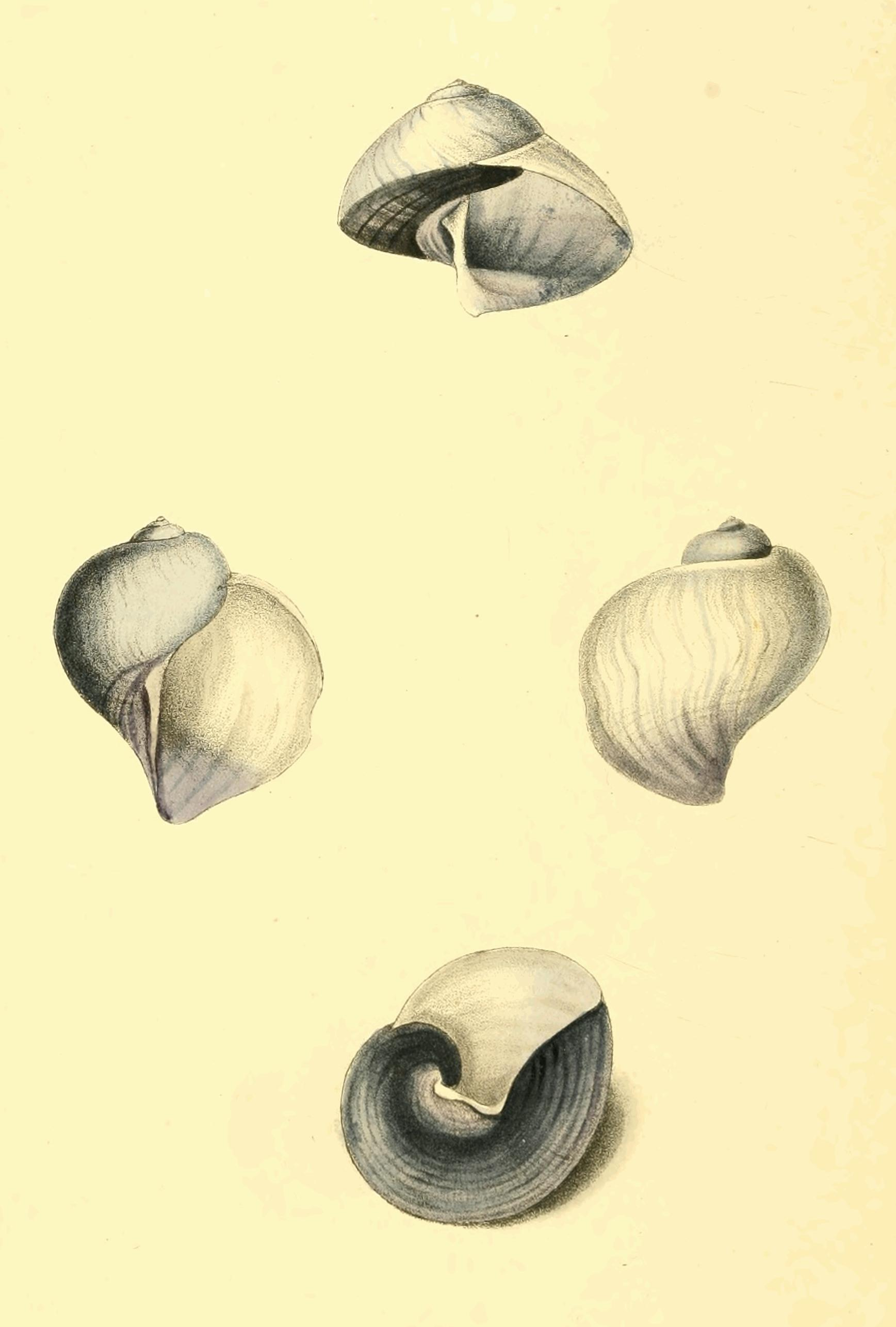
Janthina globosa, Globular Oceanic Snail—middle figures

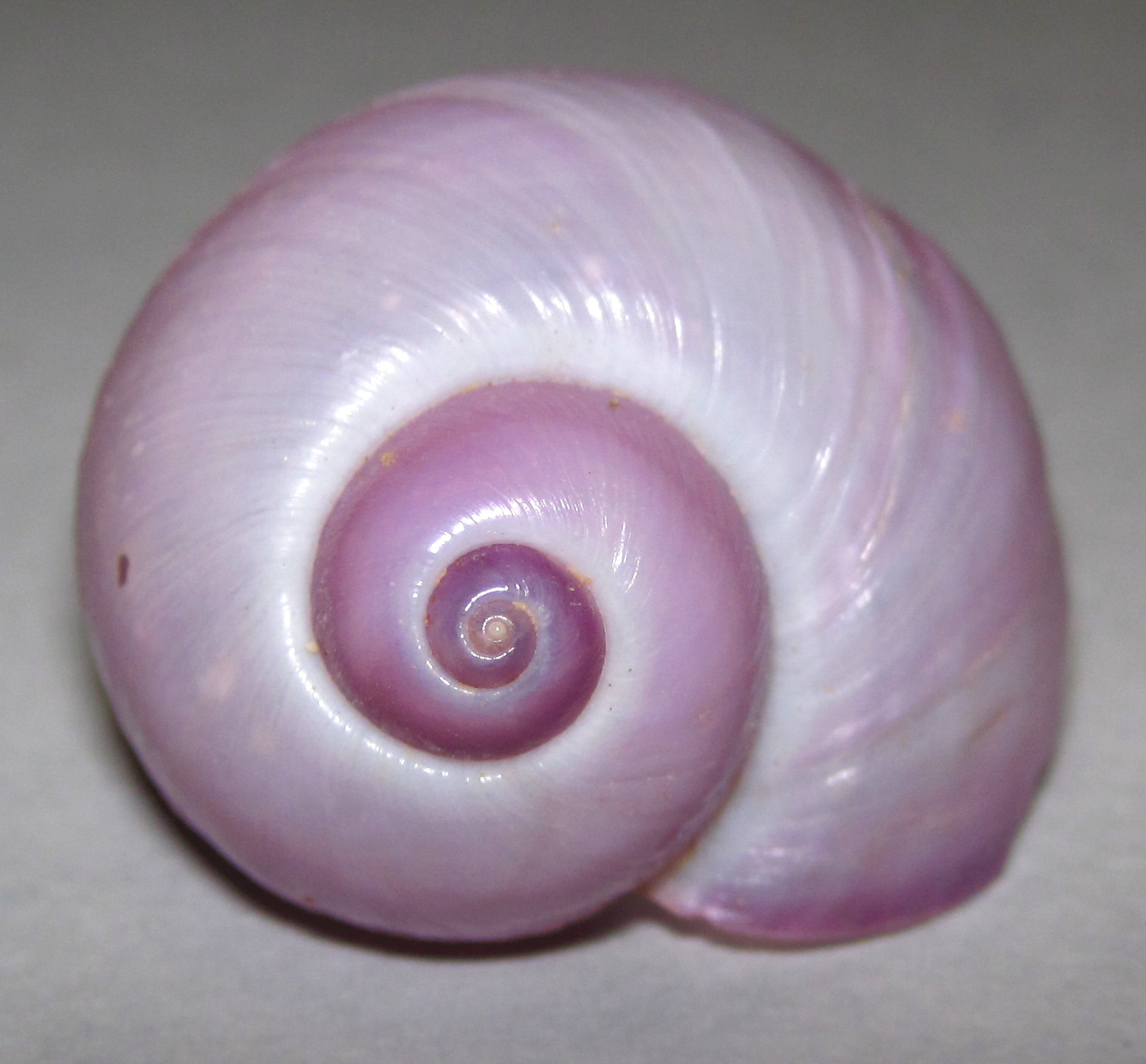

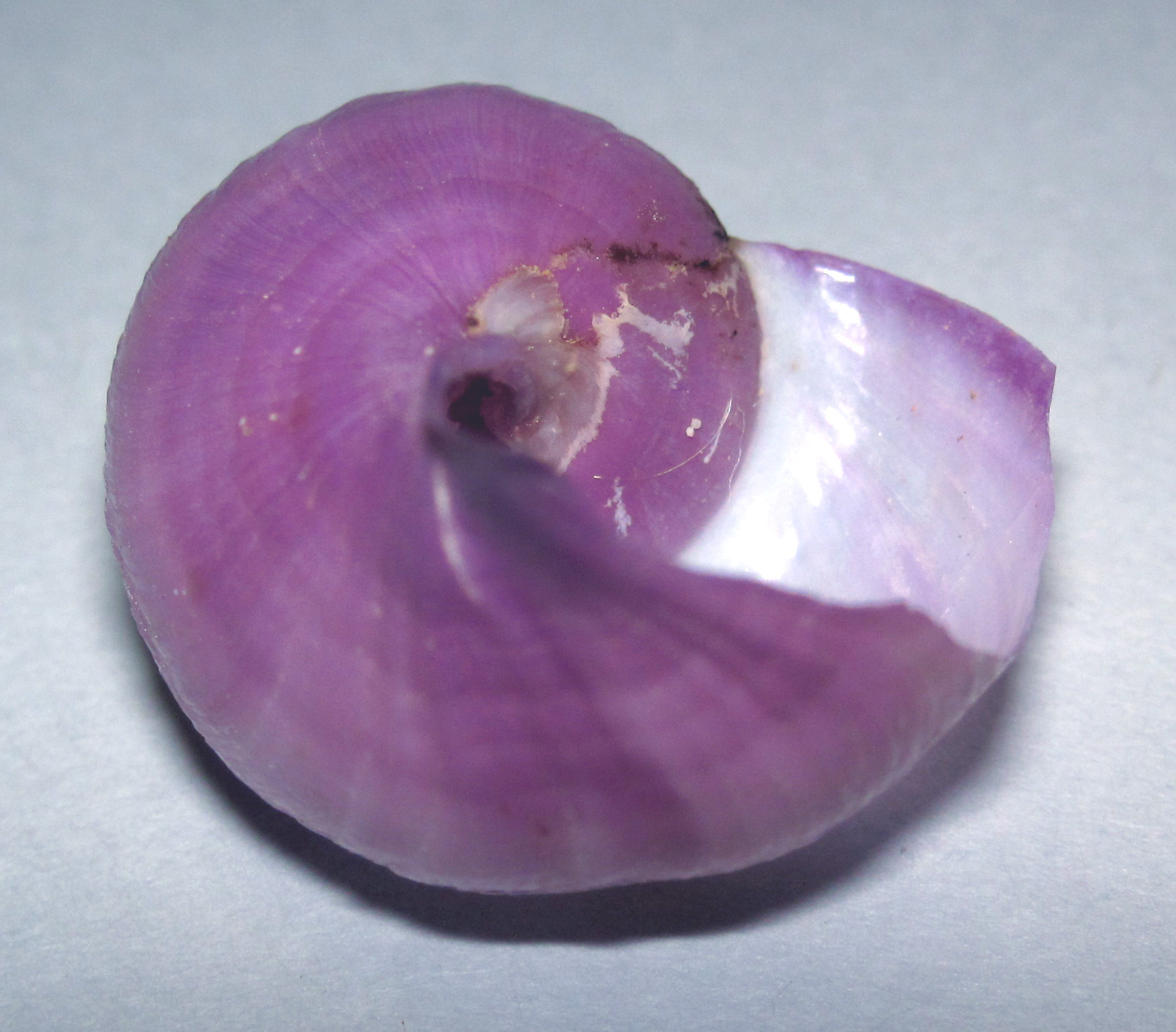
