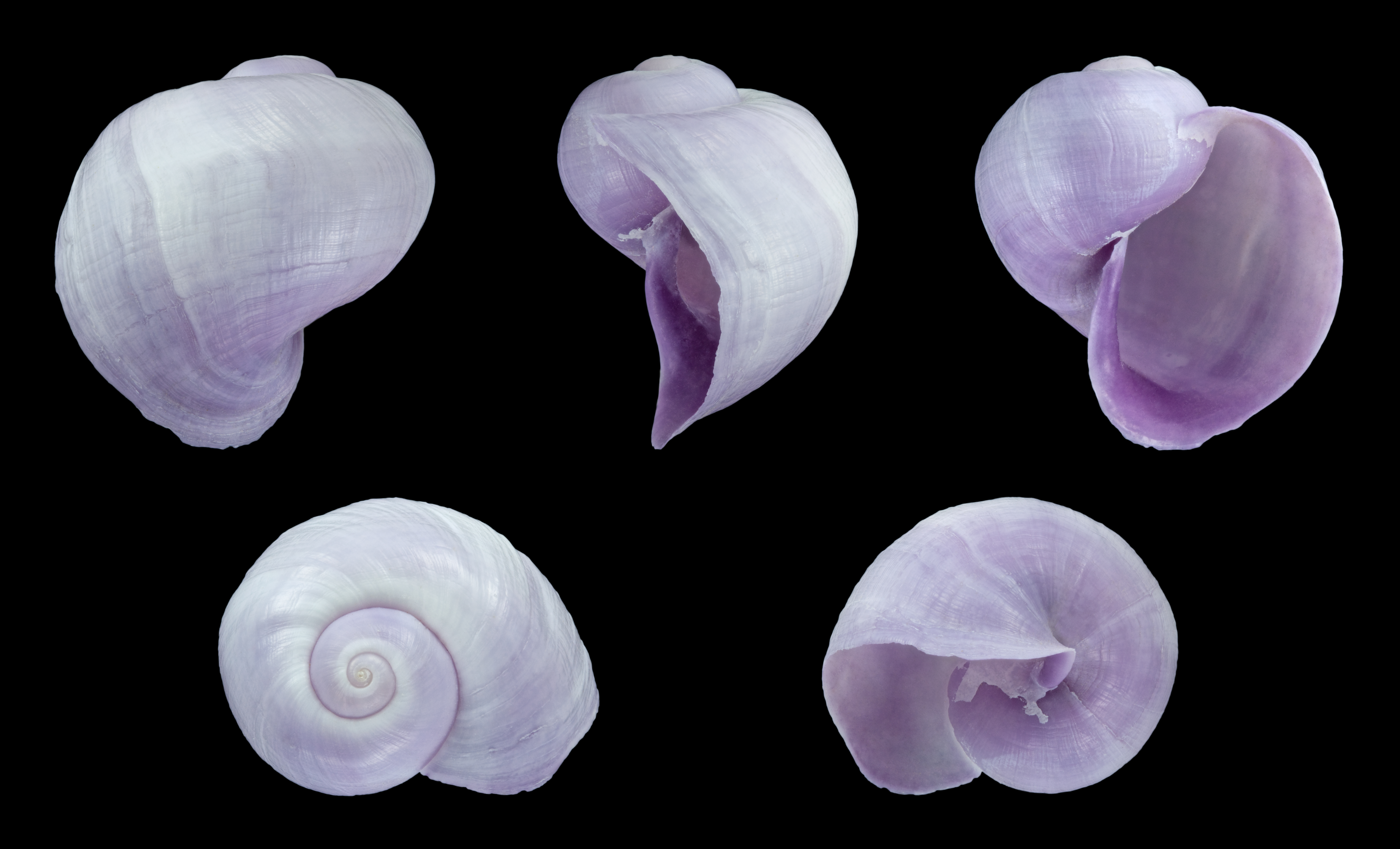
- Jathina pallida

Scientific classification
- Kingdom: Animalia
- Phylum: Mollusca
- Class: Gastropoda
- Subclass: Caenogastropoda
- Order: incertae sedis
- Superfamily: Epitonioidea
- Family: Epitoniidae
- Genus: Janthina
- Species: J. pallida

Binomial name
- Janthina pallida Thompson, 1840

Synonyms
- Janthina laeta Montrouzier, 1884; Janthina pallida var. minor Montrouzier, 1878; Janthina patula Philippi, 1844; Janthina rosea Anton, 1839; Janthina striolata Adams & Reeve, 1848

= Janthina pallida =

Species of gastropod

Janthina pallida, also known as the pale janthina, is a species of holoplanktonic sea snail, a marine gastropod mollusk in the family Epitoniidae, the violet snails or purple storm snails.

== Description ==
The maximum recorded shell length is 28 mm.

== Habitat ==
Minimum recorded depth is 0 m. Maximum recorded depth is 0 m.
