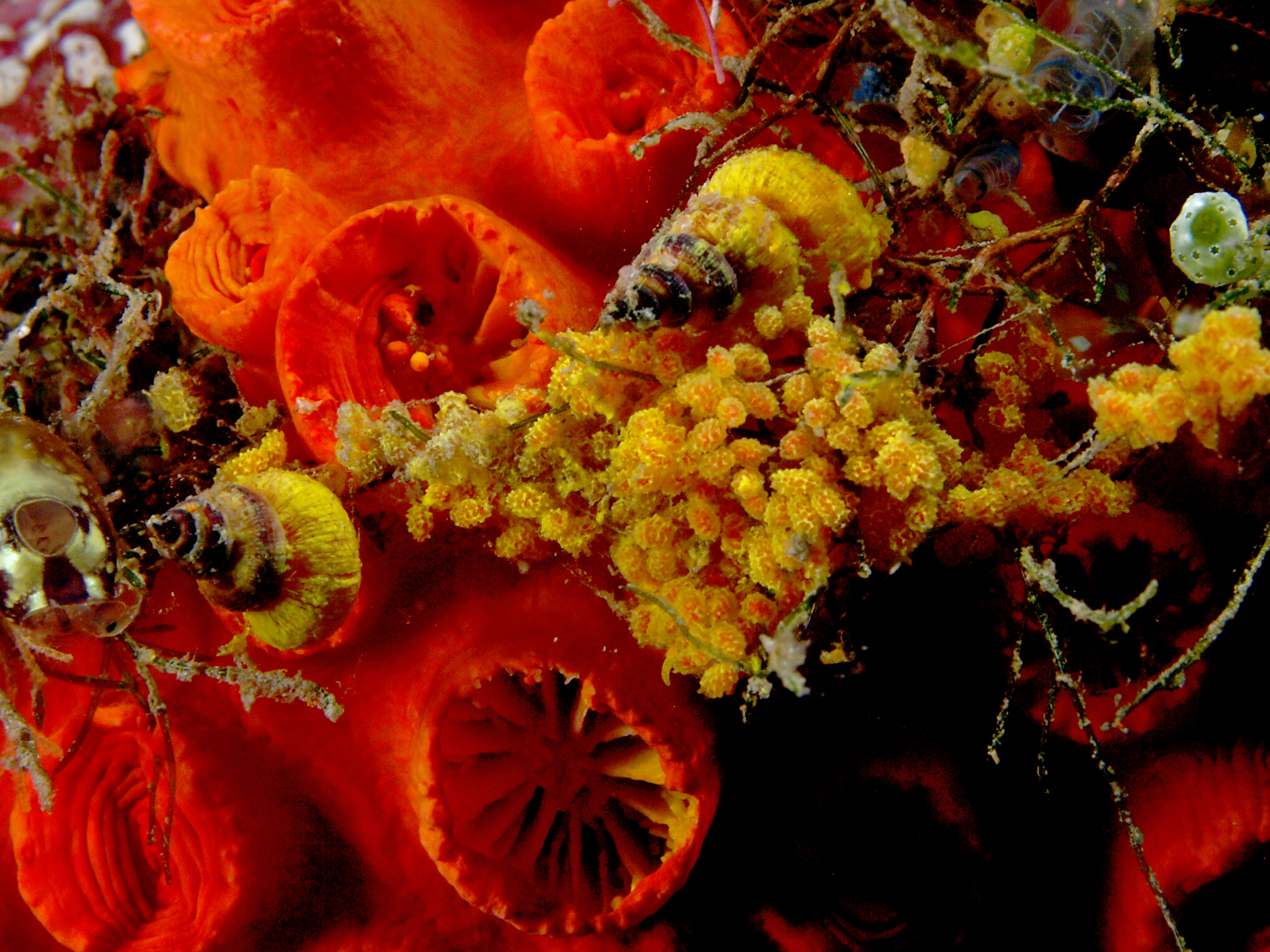
- Two live individuals of Epidendrium billeeanum and a mass of egg capsules, in situ on their food source, a cup coral

Scientific classification
- Kingdom: Animalia
- Phylum: Mollusca
- Class: Gastropoda
- Subclass: Caenogastropoda
- Order: incertae sedis
- Family: Epitoniidae
- Genus: Epidendrium
- Species: E. billeeanum

Binomial name
- Epidendrium billeeanum (DuShane & Bratcher, 1965)

Synonyms
- Alora billeeana (DuShane & Bratcher, 1965); Epitonium billeeanum (DuShane & Bratcher, 1965); Scalina billeeana DuShane & Bratcher, 1965

= Epidendrium billeeanum =

Species of gastropod

Epidendrium billeeanum, commonly known as the yellow sea snail or the golden wentletrap, is a species of small predator and ectoparasite sea snail, a marine gastropod mollusc in the family Epitoniidae, the wentletraps. They are Native to many different oceans.

== Distribution ==
This species is widespread throughout the tropical waters of the Indo-Pacific and the occidental Pacific Ocean including the Red Sea, Hawaii and the Galapagos.

== Description ==
The golden wentletrap has a bright yellow helicoidal shell which grows up to 1 cm in length. It is often found on corals from genus Tubastraea on which it feeds.
