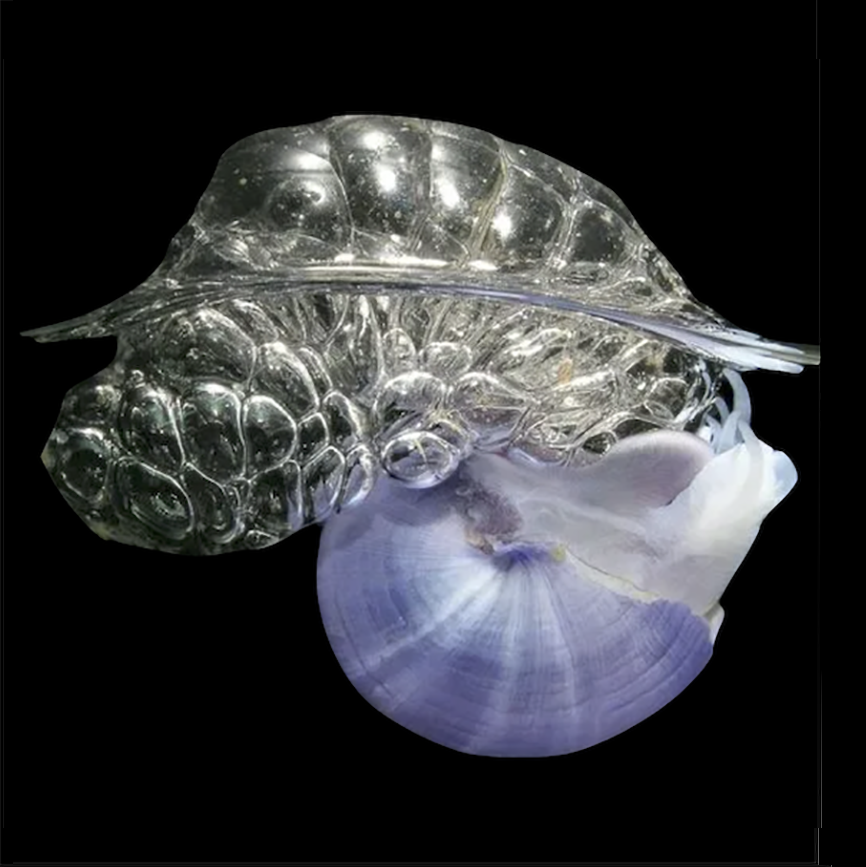
- A unknown Janthina species with a large bubble raft made from snail mucus.
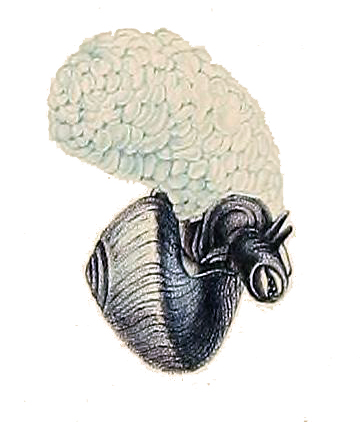
- A drawing of a live Janthina janthina with its bubble raft intact

Scientific classification
- Kingdom: Animalia
- Phylum: Mollusca
- Class: Gastropoda
- Subclass: Caenogastropoda
- Order: incertae sedis
- Superfamily: Epitonioidea
- Family: Epitoniidae
- Genus: Janthina; Röding, 1798

Species
- See text

Synonyms
- Achates Gistel, 1848 (unnecessary substitute name for Janthina); † Acrybia (Hartungia) Bronn, 1861; Amethistina [sic] (misspelling for Ametistina Schinz, 1825); Ametistina Schinz, 1825 (suppressed by ICZN Opinion 989); † Hartungia Bronn, 1861; † Heligmope Tate, 1893; Ianthina (Ianthina is an emendation or an incorrect subsequent spelling of Janthina. It was used indifferently with Janthina by 19th century authors and has remained sporadically in use throughout the 20th century.); Ianthina (Iodina) Mörch, 1860; Iodes Mörch, 1860; Iodina Mörch, 1860; Janthina (Achates) Gistel, 1848; Janthina (Iodes) Mörch, 1860; Janthina (Iodina) Mörch, 1860; Janthinus Montfort, 1810 (unjustified emendation of Janthina); Jantina [sic] (misspelling); † Kaneconcha Kaim, Tucholke & Warén, 2012; † Parajanthina Tomida & Itoigawa, 1982 †; Violetta Iredale, 1929

= Janthina =

Genus of gastropods

Janthina is a genus of small to medium-sized pelagic or planktonic sea snails that belongs to the family Epitoniidae. Species in this genus occur worldwide in tropical, subtropical and warm seas.

The common names for this genus derive from the light purple or violet color of the shells and the violet-colored bodies. The other genera in the family, Recluzia, has olive-tan colored shells.

== Description ==
They are small to medium sized and their shells and bodies often have a light purple to violet coloration. These snails do not have an operculum.

== Behavior ==
This genus exhibits hermaphroditism meaning that they produce both male and female gametes.

These snails are frequently washed ashore during storms.

=== Raft ===
The snails are able to float securely because they create a raft of clear chitin around air bubbles formed near the ocean surface. They anchor to this raft using their foot. Adult snails may not be capable of swimming, and die when they are detached from their rafts; Janthina janthina larvae, however, actively swim in the water column. The evolution of their rafts start with the proto-janthinid ancestor which was benthic with females tethering egg masses with associated males. Then these eggs become buoyant.

=== Diet ===
The adult snails prey upon (and live near to) one of several species of pelagic animals loosely known as jellyfish, more specifically they eat the medusae of free-swimming Cnidaria. In particular, they feed on the genus Velella (by-the-wind sailor) however some species, such as J. janthina, feed on it along with other jellyfish-like creatures such as Physalia physalis (Portuguese man o' war) while other species such as J. pallida prey solely on Velella.

== Species ==
The five extant species of the genus Janthina

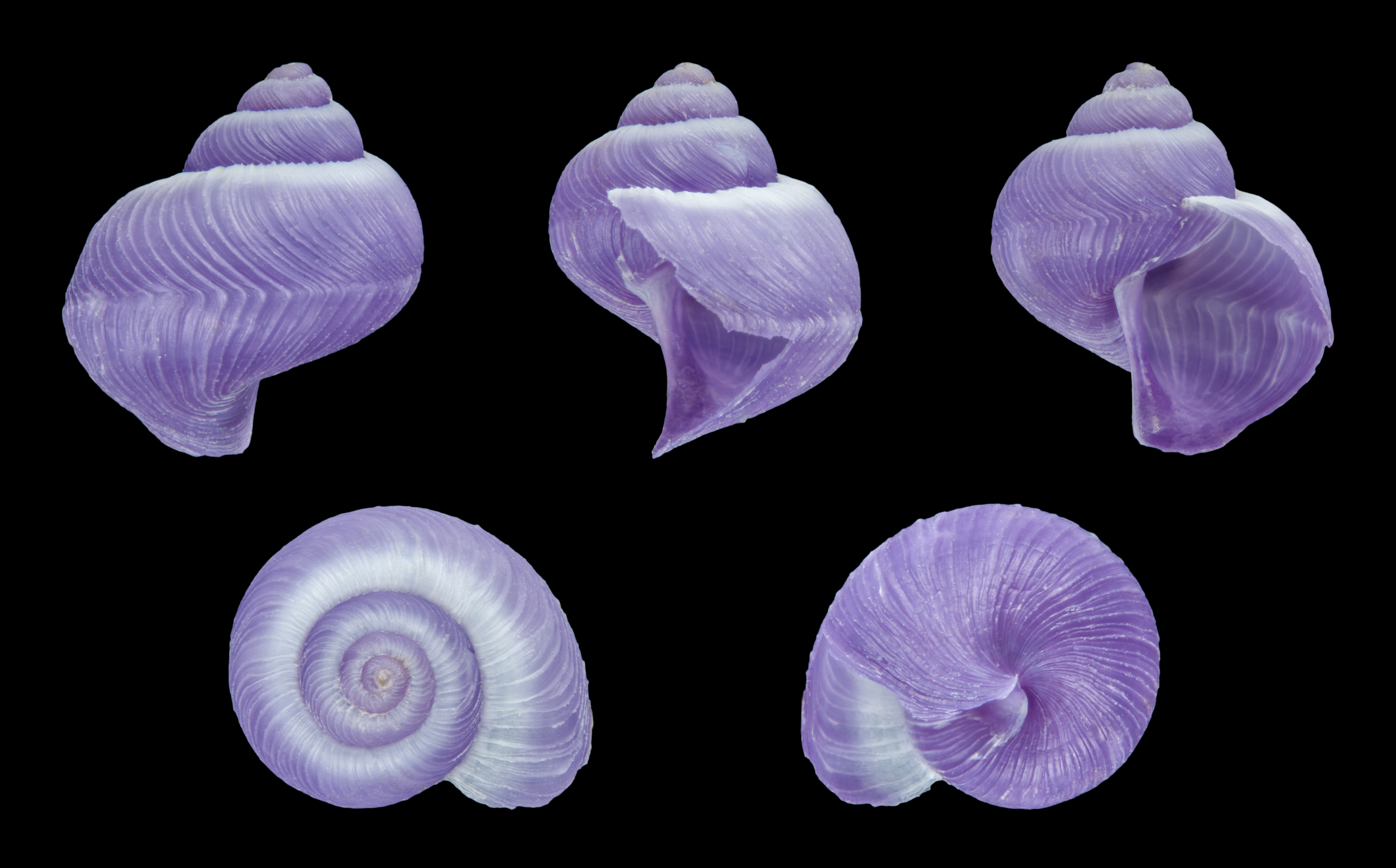
Janthina exigua

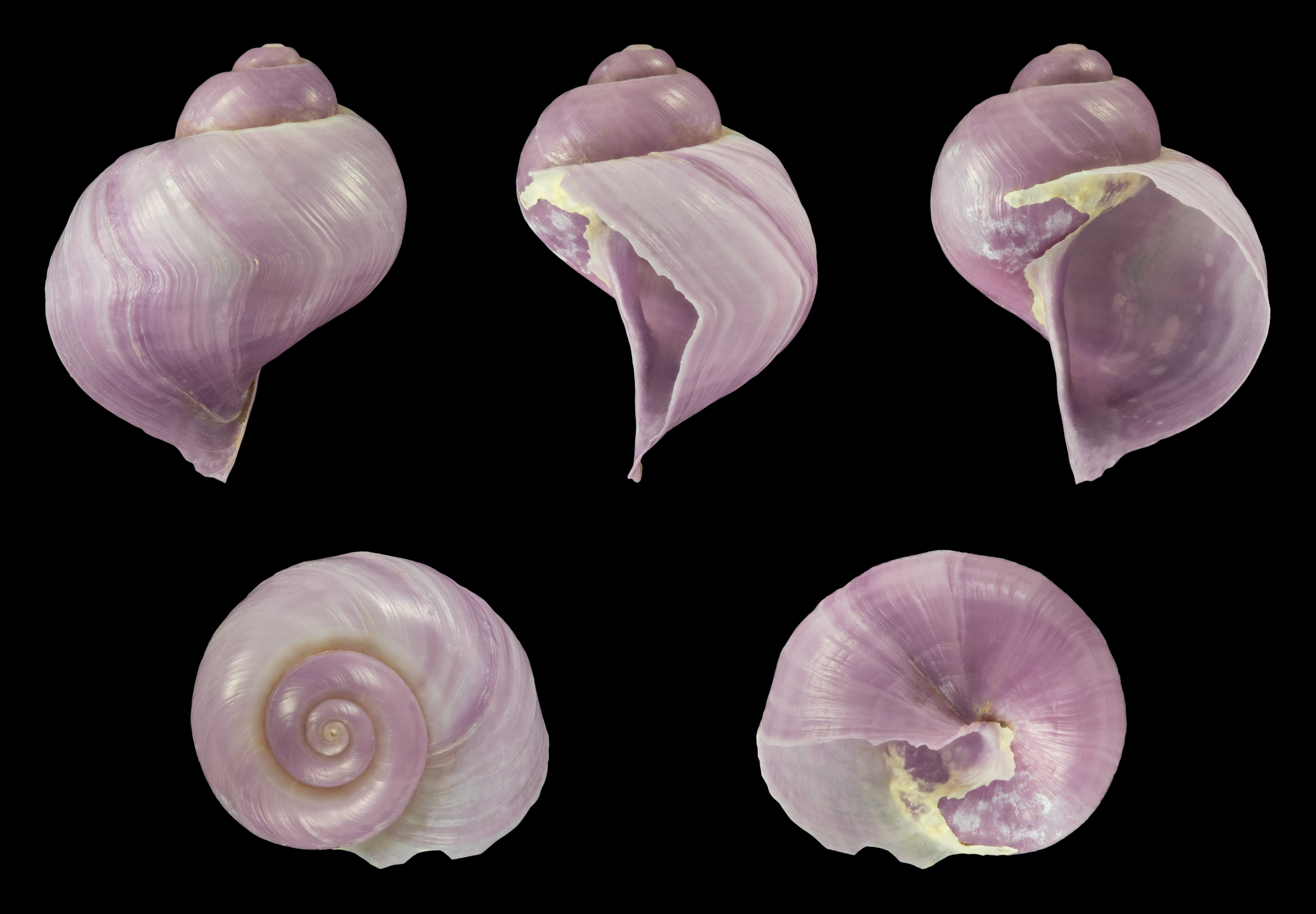
Janthina globosa

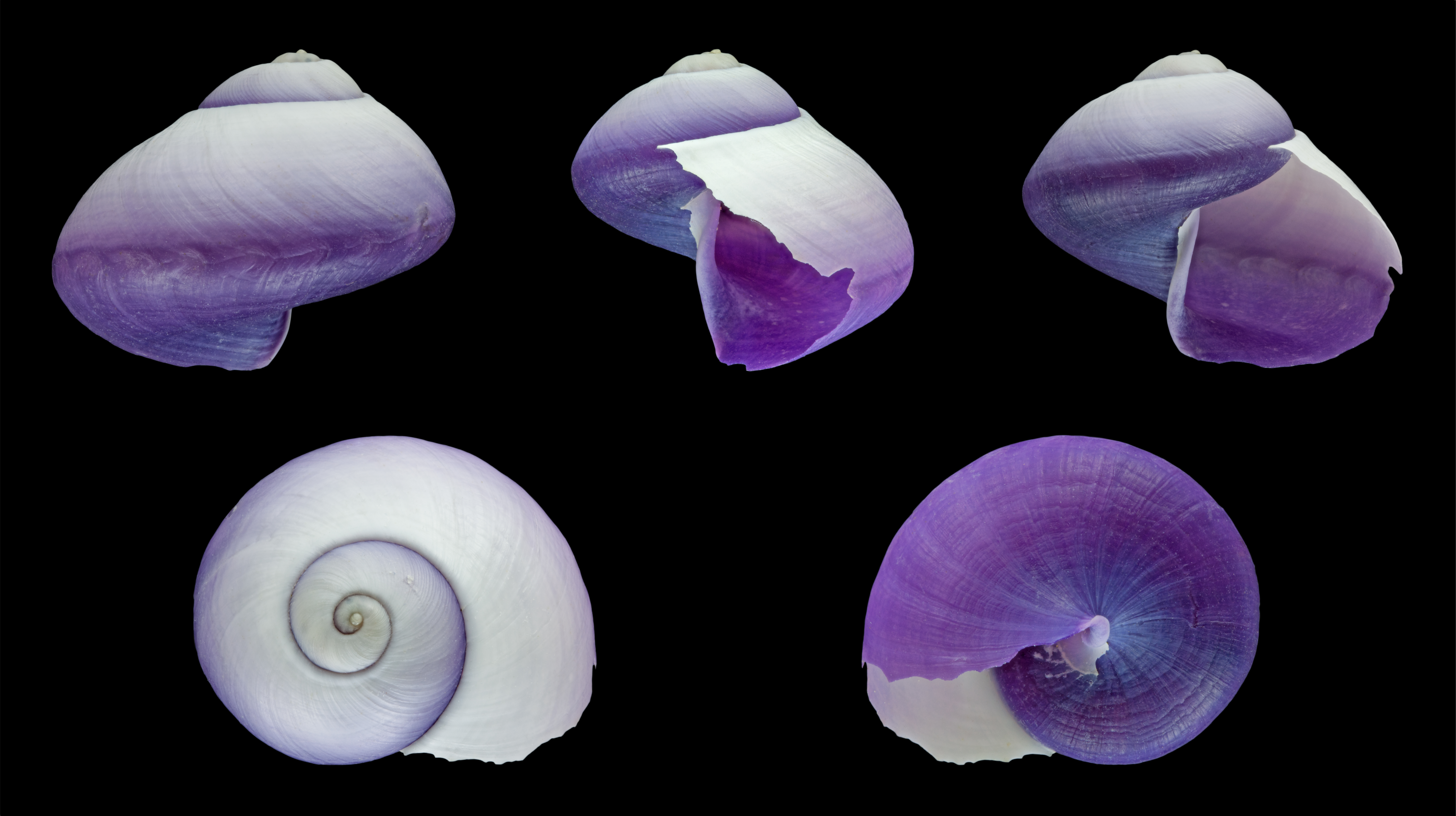
Janthina janthina

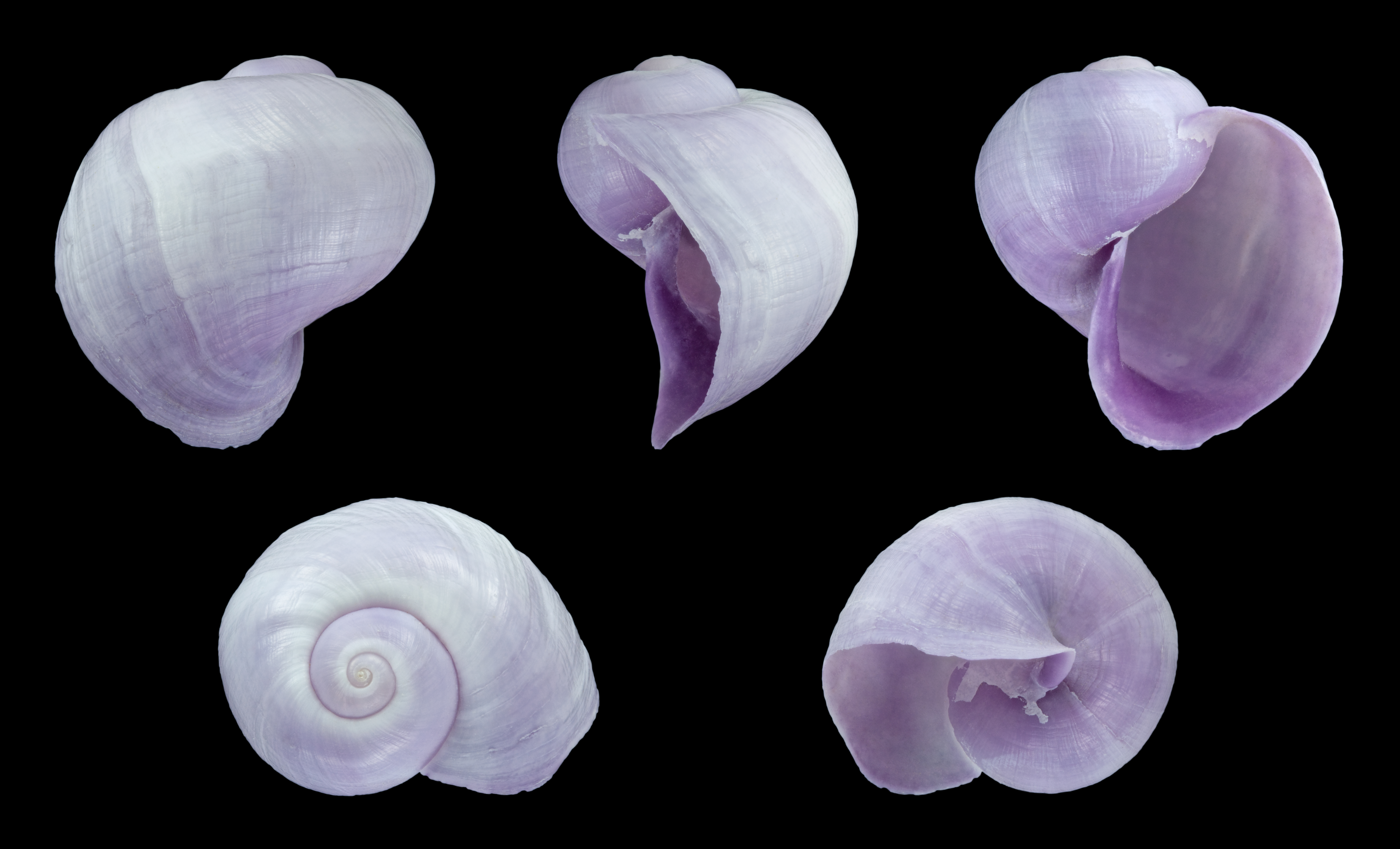
Janthina pallida

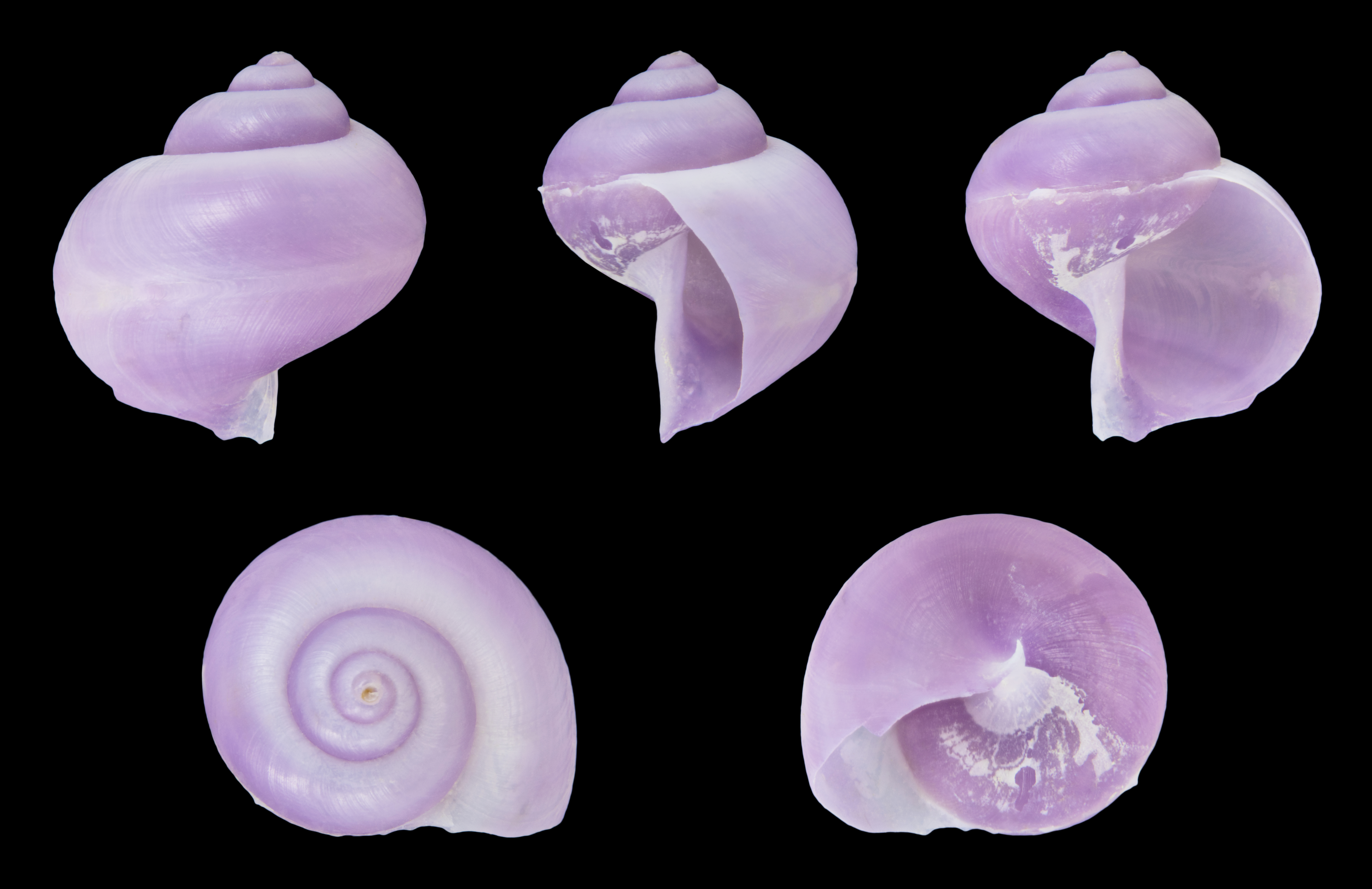
Janthina umbilicata

This genus has accumulated a very large number of species names over the centuries. Most of the names that have been given are in fact synonyms of just a few species which have world-wide distributions in tropical waters. Experts disagree about some details of the synonymy.

Species within the genus Janthina include:

- † Janthina chavani (Ludbrook, 1978)
- Janthina exigua Lamarck, 1816 - dwarf janthina
- Janthina globosa Swainson, 1822
- Janthina janthina (Linnaeus, 1758)
- † Janthina krejcii Beu, 2017
- Janthina pallida W. Thompson, 1840
- † Janthina typica (Bronn, 1861)
- Janthina umbilicata d'Orbigny, 1841

Species brought into synonymy

- Janthina affinis Reeve, 1858: synonym of Janthina janthina (Linnaeus, 1758)
- Janthina africana Reeve, 1858: synonym of Janthina janthina (Linnaeus, 1758)
- Janthina alba Anton, 1838: synonym of Janthina janthina (Linnaeus, 1758)
- Janthina balteata Reeve, 1858: synonym of Janthina janthina (Linnaeus, 1758)
- Janthina bicolor Menke, 1828: synonym of Janthina janthina (Linnaeus, 1758)
- Janthina bicolor O. G. Costa, 1830: synonym of Janthina janthina (Linnaeus, 1758)
- Janthina bifida Nuttall, 1850: synonym of Janthina exigua Lamarck, 1816
- Janthina britannica Forbes & Hanley, 1853: synonym of Janthina janthina (Linnaeus, 1758)
- Janthina capreolata Montrouzier, 1860: synonym of Janthina exigua Lamarck, 1816
- Janthina carpenteri Mörch, 1860: synonym of Janthina janthina (Linnaeus, 1758)
- Janthina casta Reeve, 1858: synonym of Janthina janthina (Linnaeus, 1758)
- Janthina coeruleata Reeve, 1858: synonym of Janthina janthina (Linnaeus, 1758)
- Janthina communis Lamarck, 1822: synonym of Janthina janthina (Linnaeus, 1758)
- Janthina contorta Carpenter, 1857: synonym of Janthina janthina (Linnaeus, 1758)
- Janthina costae Mörch, 1860: synonym of Janthina janthina (Linnaeus, 1758)
- Janthina decollata Carpenter, 1857: synonym of Janthina globosa Swainson, 1822
- Janthina depressa Reeve, 1858: synonym of Janthina janthina (Linnaeus, 1758)
- Janthina elongata [sic]: synonym of Janthina globosa Swainson, 1822
- Janthina fibula Reeve, 1858: synonym of Janthina janthina (Linnaeus, 1758)
- Janthina fragilis Lamarck, 1801: synonym of Janthina janthina (Linnaeus, 1758)
- Janthina globosa Blainville, 1822: synonym of Janthina umbilicata d'Orbigny, 1840
- Janthina grandis Reeve, 1858: synonym of Janthina janthina (Linnaeus, 1758)
- Janthina incisa Philippi, 1848: synonym of Janthina exigua Lamarck, 1816
- Janthina involuta Reeve, 1858: synonym of Janthina janthina (Linnaeus, 1758)
- Janthina iricolor Reeve, 1858: synonym of Janthina globosa Swainson, 1822
- Janthina jehennei (Petit de la Saussaye, 1853): synonym of Recluzia jehennei Petit de la Saussaye, 1853
- Janthina laeta Monterosato, 1884: synonym of Janthina pallida W. Thompson, 1840
- Janthina megastoma A. Adams, 1861: synonym of Janthina umbilicata d'Orbigny, 1840
- Janthina nana Gray, 1842: synonym of Janthina globosa Swainson, 1822
- Janthina nitens Menke, 1828: synonym of Janthina globosa Swainson, 1822
- Janthina nitida A. Adams, 1861: synonym of Janthina exigua Lamarck, 1816
- Janthina orbignyi Mörch, 1860: synonym of Janthina janthina (Linnaeus, 1758)
- Janthina patula Philippi, 1844: synonym of Janthina pallida W. Thompson, 1840
- Janthina payraudeaui Locard, 1900: synonym of Janthina globosa Swainson, 1822
- Janthina penicephela Peron, 1824: synonym of Janthina janthina (Linnaeus, 1758)
- Janthina planispirata A. Adams & Reeve, 1848: synonym of Janthina janthina (Linnaeus, 1758)
- Janthina prolongata Blainville, 1822: synonym of Janthina globosa Swainson, 1822
- Janthina rosea Anton, 1838: synonym of Janthina pallida W. Thompson, 1840
- Janthina roseala Reeve, 1858: synonym of Janthina janthina (Linnaeus, 1758)
- Janthina roseola Reeve, 1858: synonym of Janthina janthina (Linnaeus, 1758)
- Janthina rotundata Dillwyn, 1840: synonym of Janthina janthina (Linnaeus, 1758)
- Janthina smithiae Reeve, 1858: synonym of Janthina janthina (Linnaeus, 1758)
- Janthina splendens Monterosato, 1884: synonym of Janthina globosa Swainson, 1822
- Janthina striata Montrouzier, 1860: synonym of Janthina exigua Lamarck, 1816
- Janthina striolata A. Adams & Reeve, 1848: synonym of Janthina pallida W. Thompson, 1840
- Janthina striulata Carpenter, 1857: synonym of Janthina janthina (Linnaeus, 1758)
- Janthina trochoidea Reeve, 1858: synonym of Janthina janthina (Linnaeus, 1758)
- Janthina vinsoni Deshayes, 1863: synonym of Janthina exigua Lamarck, 1816
- Janthina violacea Röding, 1798: synonym of Janthina janthina (Linnaeus, 1758)
- Janthina vulgaris Gray, 1847: synonym of Janthina janthina (Linnaeus, 1758)
