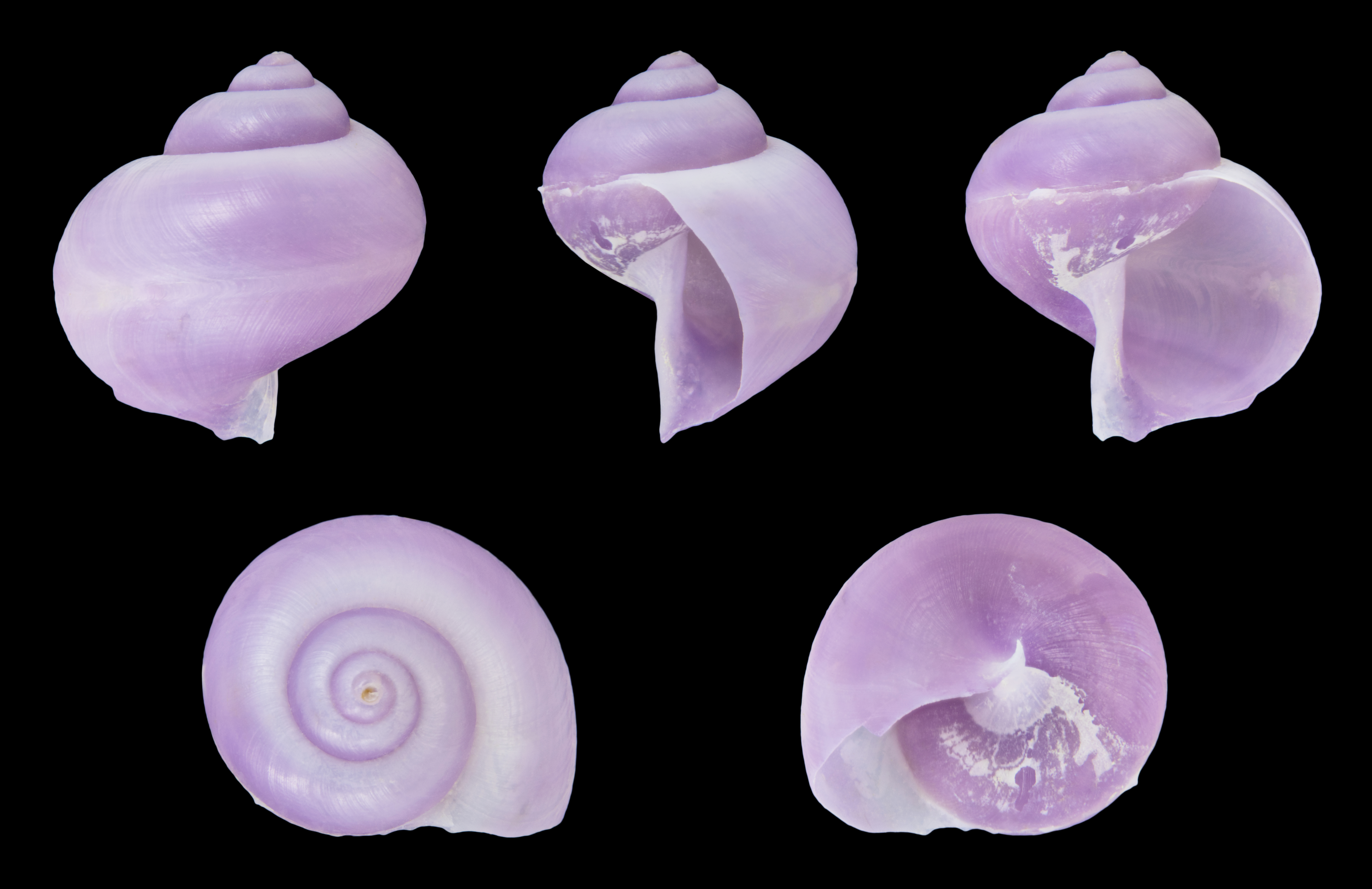

Scientific classification
- Kingdom: Animalia
- Phylum: Mollusca
- Class: Gastropoda
- Subclass: Caenogastropoda
- Order: incertae sedis
- Superfamily: Epitonioidea
- Family: Epitoniidae
- Genus: Janthina
- Species: J. umbilicata

Binomial name
- Janthina umbilicata d'Orbigny, 1841

Synonyms
- Janthina globosa Blainville, 1825; Janthina megastoma Adams, 1861

= Janthina umbilicata =

Species of gastropod

Janthina umbilicata, also known as the elongate janthina, is a species of holoplanktonic sea snail, a marine gastropod mollusk in the family Epitoniidae, the violet snails or purple storm snails.

== Description ==
The maximum recorded shell length is 9.5 mm.

== Habitat ==
Minimum recorded depth is 0 m. Maximum recorded depth is 0 m.
