= Epidendrium =

Scientific classification
- Kingdom: Animalia
- Phylum: Mollusca
- Class: Gastropoda
- Subclass: Caenogastropoda
- Order: incertae sedis
- Family: Epitoniidae
- Genus: Epidendrium; A. Gittenberger & E. Gittenberger, 2005

Genus of molluscs

Epidendrium is a genus of gastropods belonging to the family Epitoniidae.

The species of this genus are found in Southern Europe, America, Malesia, Australia.

Species:

- Epidendrium aureum Gittenberger & Gittenberger, 2005
- Epidendrium billeeanum (DuShane & Bratcher, 1965)
- Epidendrium dendrophylliae (Bouchet & Warén, 1986)
- Epidendrium parvitrochoides Nakayama, 2016
- Epidendrium reticulatum (Habe, 1962)
- Epidendrium sordidum Gittenberger & Gittenberger, 2005
