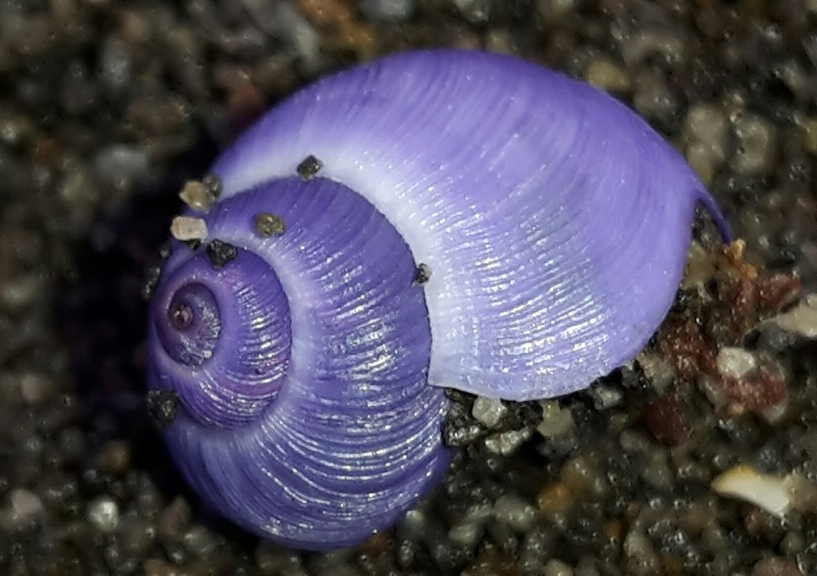
- Live Janthina exigua retracted into its shell
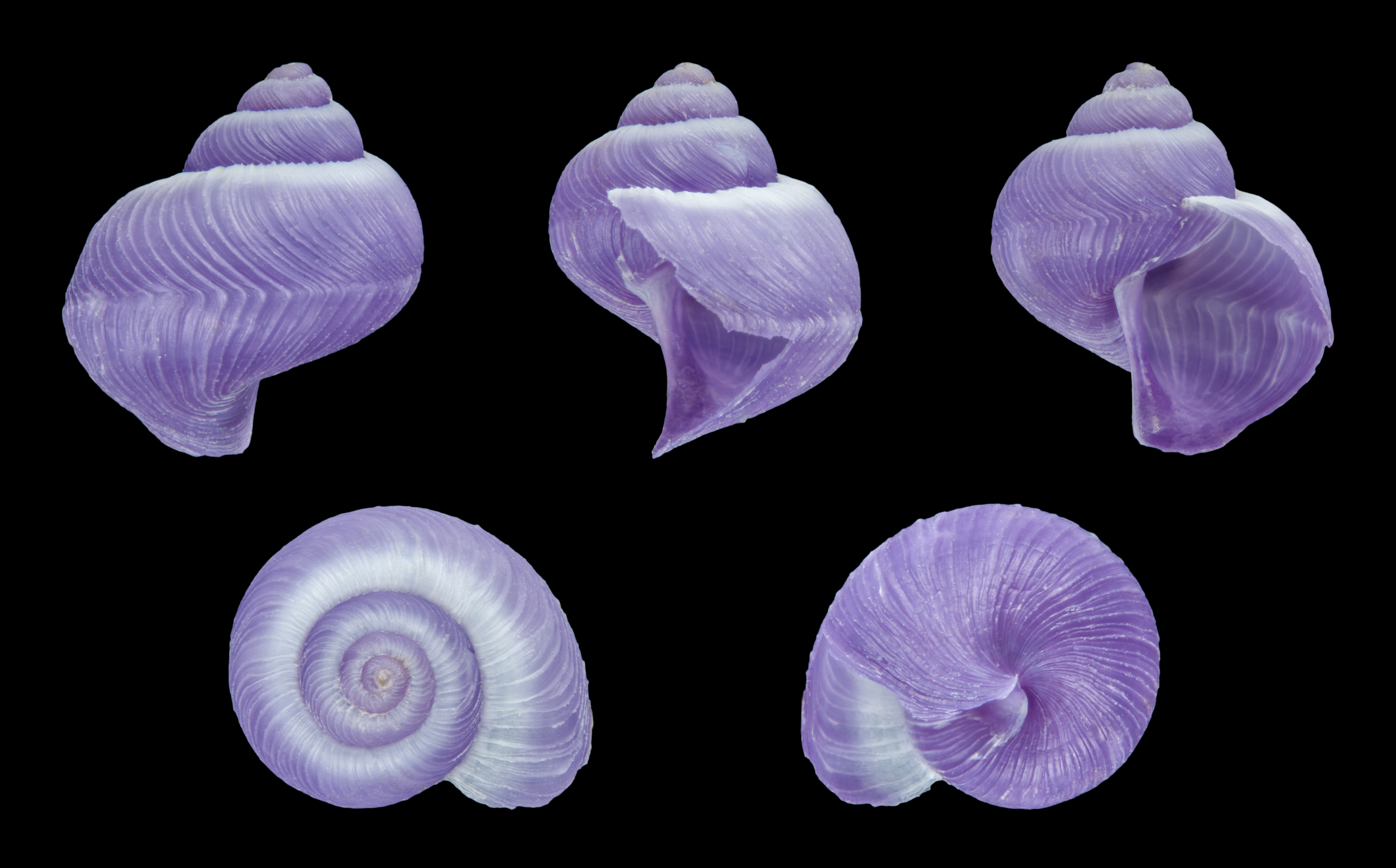
- Shell of Janthina exigua

Scientific classification
- Kingdom: Animalia
- Phylum: Mollusca
- Class: Gastropoda
- Subclass: Caenogastropoda
- Order: incertae sedis
- Superfamily: Epitonioidea
- Family: Epitoniidae
- Genus: Janthina
- Species: J. exigua

Binomial name
- Janthina exigua Lamarck, 1816

Synonyms
- Janthina bifida Nuttall, 1850; Janthina capreolata Montrouzier, 1860; Janthina incisa Philippi, 1848; Janthina nitida Adams, 1861; Janthina striata Montrouzier, 1860; Janthina vinsoni Deshayes, 1863

= Janthina exigua =

Species of gastropod

Janthina exigua, also known as the dwarf janthina, is a species of small holoplanktonic sea snail, a marine gastropod mollusk in the family Epitoniidae, the violet snails or purple storm snails.

== Distribution ==
This species is pelagic, and occurs around the world in tropical waters, in other words it is circumequatorial.

It has been recorded from:

- The Atlantic Ocean
- British Isles
- European waters
- Madagascar
- Mascarene Plateau
- Mediterranean Sea
- Mozambique
- The Pacific Ocean
- South Africa
- The West Coast of Ireland

== Description ==
The maximum recorded shell length is 15.3 mm.

== Habitat ==
Minimum recorded depth is 0 m. Maximum recorded depth is 0 m.
