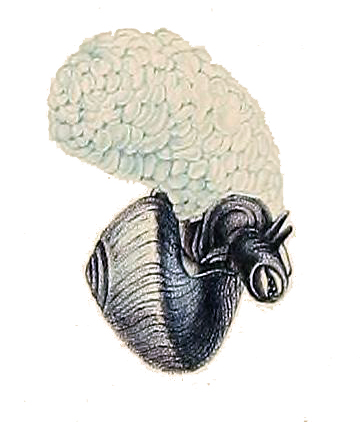
- Nineteenth-century illustration
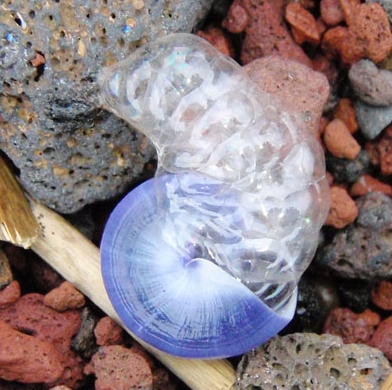
- A live Janthina janthina, with bubble raft, that has been washed up in Maui, Hawaii. This is the normal view from above: the spire of the shell is held pointing down when the animal is floating on the surface of the ocean.

Scientific classification
- Kingdom: Animalia
- Phylum: Mollusca
- Class: Gastropoda
- Subclass: Caenogastropoda
- Order: incertae sedis
- Superfamily: Epitonioidea
- Family: Epitoniidae
- Genus: Janthina
- Species: J. janthina

Binomial name
- Janthina janthina (Linnaeus, 1758)

Synonyms
- Helix janthina Linnaeus, 1758; Janthina affinis Reeve, 1858; Janthina africana Reeve, 1858; Janthina alba Anton, 1838; Janthina balteata Reeve, 1858; Janthina bicolor Menke, 1828; Janthina bicolor var. major Monterosato, 1878; Janthina bicolor var. minor Monterosato, 1878; Janthina britannica Forbes & Hanley, 1853; Janthina carpenteri Mørch, 1860; Janthina carpenteri var. contorta Tryon, 1887; Janthina casta Reeve, 1858; Janthina coeruleata Reeve, 1858; Janthina communis Lamarck, 1799; Janthina costae Mørch, 1860; Janthina depressa Reeve, 1858; Janthina fibula Reeve, 1858; Janthina fragilis Lamarck, 1799 (junior synonym); Janthina fragilis var. spiraelata Mørch, 1860; Janthina grandis Reeve, 1858; Janthina involuta Reeve, 1858; Janthina orbignyi Mørch, 1860; Janthina penicephela Peron, 1824; Janthina planispirata Adams & Reeve, 1848; Janthina roseala Reeve, 1858; Janthina rotundata Dillwyn, 1840; Janthina smithiae Reeve, 1858; Janthina striulata Carpenter, 1857; Janthina striulata var. contorta Carpenter, 1857; Janthina trochoidea Reeve, 1858; Janthina violacea Bolten, 1798; Janthina vulgaris Gray, 1847

= Janthina janthina =

Species of gastropod

Janthina janthina is a species of holoplanktonic sea snail, a marine gastropod mollusk in the family Epitoniidae. Its common names include violet sea-snail, common violet snail, large violet snail and purple storm snail.

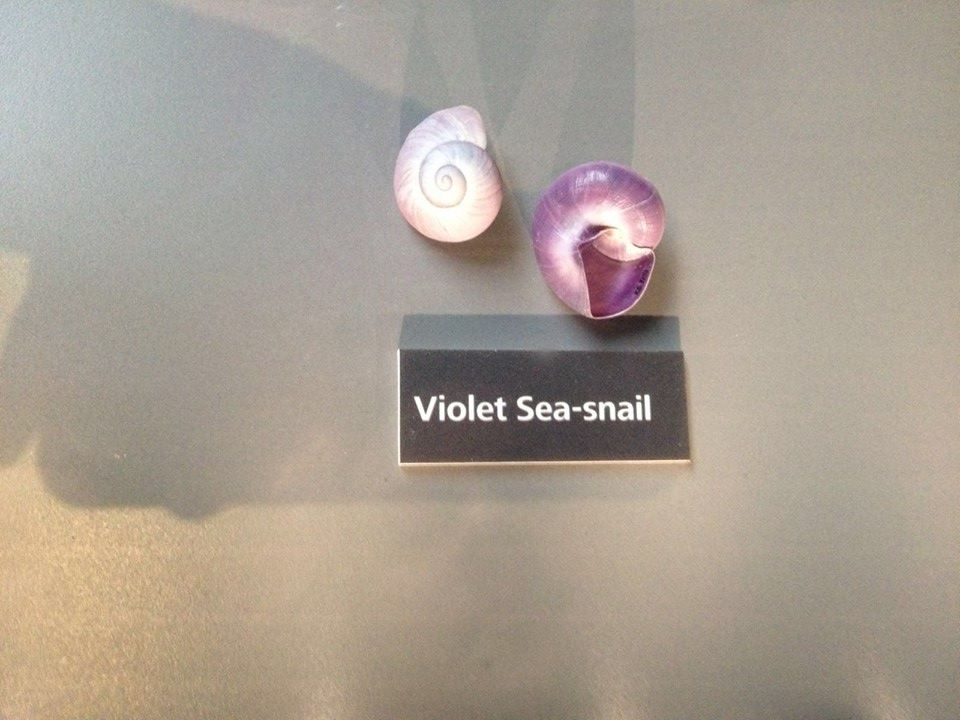
Exhibit of Janthina janthina at Manchester Museum

== Distribution ==
This species is found worldwide in the warm waters of tropical and temperate seas, floating at the surface. More specifically, the species is located in the tropical and subtropical Atlantic, Indian and Pacific oceans. They are often found in large groups and sometimes become stranded on beaches when they are blown ashore by strong winds. The snails are a unique part of the neuston, organisms which live on or near the surface of the water, because of their relatively large size. They have veliger, or free swimming larvae, but the adults do not swim, and cannot create their rafts, except at the surface where air bubbles are available.

== Habitat ==
These snails are pelagic, drifting on the surface of the ocean, where they feed upon pelagic hydrozoa, especially the by-the-wind sailor, Velella velella, and the Portuguese man o' war, Physalia physalis.

== Description ==
J. janthina is a member of the family Janthinidae, snails that trap air bubbles to maintain their positions at the surface of the ocean, where they are predators on hydrozoa. The air bubbles are stabilized by the secretion of amphiphilic mucins which have evolved from epitoniid egg masses. This passive flotation is a particularly resource-efficient form of animal locomotion. In addition to the bubble raft, only the veliger, or larval stage, has an operculum, and the shell is paper-thin to allow the animal to float upside down at the surface.

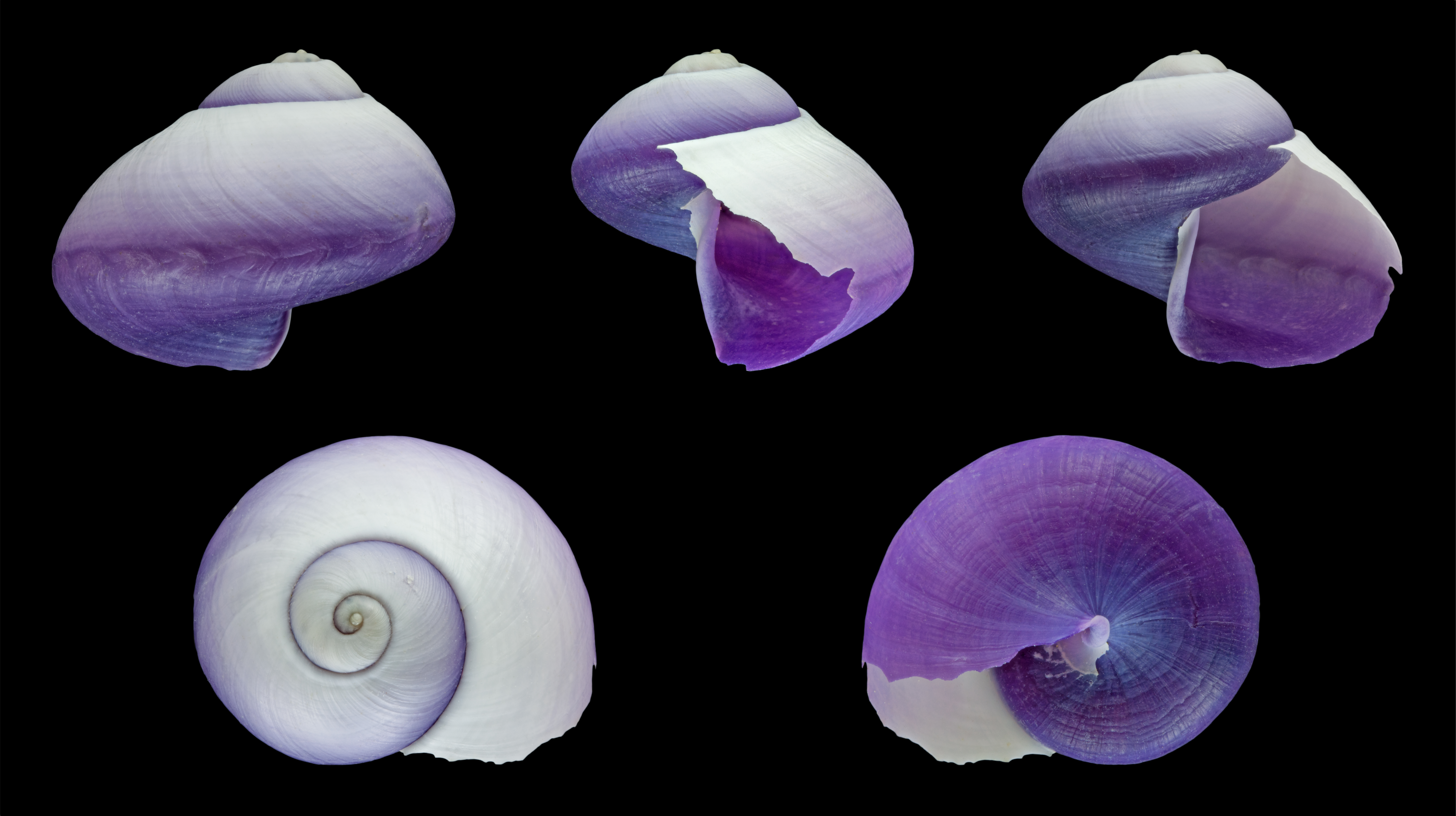
Five views of a shell of Janthina janthina

The snail's shell is reverse countershaded, because of its upside-down position in the water column. There is a light purple shade on the spire of the shell, and a darker purple on the ventral side. The animal has a large head on a very flexible neck. The eyes are small and are situated at the base of its tentacles. The shell, which is violet, with a paler upper surface, is almost smooth, with a slightly depressed-globose shape. It is thin and delicate, and is without an operculum. The height of the species shell is up to 38 mm, the width to 40 mm.

The snail begins life as a male and later changes into a female. The eggs are held by the female until they develop into the larval form.
