= List of fossiliferous stratigraphic units in Colombia =

Locations of major fossiliferous stratigraphic units in Colombia
Neogene
V = La Venta: Honda Group
Co = Cocinetas Basin: Ware & Castilletes Fms
Paleogene
B = Bogotá Formation
C = Cerrejón Formation
Cretaceous
H = Hiló Formation
P = Paja Formation
Jurassic
J = Valle Alto Formation
Devonian
F = Cuche and Floresta Formations
Cambro-Ordovician
M = Serranía de la Macarena, Meta

Several stratigraphic units in Colombia have provided fossils. The richest formations are the Devonian Cuche and Floresta Formations, the Cretaceous Paja Formation, the Paleocene Cerrejón Formation and the Miocene La Venta site. The latter is the richest Konzentrat-Lagerstätte in northern South America and comprises the formations of the Honda Group.

== Fossiliferous stratigraphic units ==
Formations are ordered according to their youngest age

	Age	Formations	Locations	Departments	Fossils	Image	Notes
Cenozoic	Holocene	Quaternary alluvium	Yumbo; Turbaná	Valle del Cauca; Bolívar	Stegomastodon waringi		(Note: Reclassified as Notiomastodon platensis by Mothé & Avilla (2015))
Cenozoic	Holocene		Curití	Santander	collared peccary (Tayassu tajacu), South American tapir (Tapirus terrestris), white-lipped peccary (Tayassu pecari), Cryptotis sp., Hydrochoerus sp., Mazama sp.		
Cenozoic	Pleistocene (Lujanian)		Curití	Santander	Haplomastodon chimborazi		
Cenozoic	Late Pleistocene	Sabana Fm.	Tibitó, Checua, Bosa, Guasca, Guatavita, Soacha, Tunjuelito, Mosquera, Tocancipá, Bogotá savanna	Cundinamarca	Cuvieronius hyodon, Equus amerhippus lasallei, Haplomastodon waringi or H. chimborazi		
Cenozoic	Late Pleistocene	Soatá Fm.	Soatá	Boyacá	Colombibos atactodontus, Haplomastodon waringi		
Cenozoic	Late Pleistocene	Soatá Fm.	Soatá	Boyacá	Neochoerus sp., Odocoileus salinae		
Cenozoic	Middle Pleistocene		Quipile	Cundinamarca	Megatherium sp.		
Cenozoic	Middle Pleistocene		Tocaima	Cundinamarca	Haplomastodon waringi		
Cenozoic	Pleistocene	Rotinet Fm.	Rotinet, Repelón	Atlántico	Haplomastodon waringi		
Cenozoic	Pleistocene		Arboleda; El Remolino, Taminango	Nariño	Haplomastodon sp.		
Cenozoic	Pleistocene		Mercaderes	Cauca	Haplomastodon sp.		
Cenozoic	Pleistocene		Toro	Valle del Cauca	Stegomastodon sp.		
Cenozoic	Pleistocene		Medellín	Antioquia	Gomphotheriidae indet.		
Cenozoic	Pleistocene		El Cocuy, Duitama, Sáchica, Socotá, Tunja, Villa de Leyva	Boyacá	Gomphotheriidae indet.		
Cenozoic	Pleistocene		Salamina	Caldas	Gomphotheriidae indet.		
Cenozoic	Pleistocene		Fusagasugá	Cundinamarca	Gomphotheriidae indet.		
Cenozoic	Pleistocene		Carrizal, Uribia	La Guajira	Gomphotheriidae indet.		
Cenozoic	Pleistocene		Cabrera & San Alfonso, Villavieja	Huila	Gomphotheriidae indet.		
Cenozoic	Pleistocene		Cúcuta, Pamplona	Norte de Santander	Gomphotheriidae indet.		
Cenozoic	Pleistocene		Agualinda, Lebrija; Vélez	Santander	Gomphotheriidae indet.		
Cenozoic	Pleistocene		Ibagué, Ortega	Tolima	Gomphotheriidae indet.		
Cenozoic	Pleistocene		La Victoria, Zarzal	Valle del Cauca	Gomphotheriidae indet.		
Cenozoic	Pleistocene		Cocha Verde, Taminango	Nariño	Selenogonus nariñoensis		
Cenozoic	Pliocene		Cocha Verde, Taminango	Nariño	Selenogonus nariñoensis		
Cenozoic	Piacenzian	Ware Fm. (3.4-2.78 Ma)	Cocinetas Basin	La Guajira	Chapalmalania sp., Hydrochoeropsis wayuu, Tardigrada n. gen. & sp., Lestodontini n. gen. & sp., Cichlidae sp., Sciaenidae sp., Doradidae sp., Pimelodidae sp., Characidae sp., Cynodontidae sp., Serrasalmidae sp., Podocnemididae sp., Aves sp., Crocodylidae sp., Alligatoridae sp., Toxodontidae sp., Hydrochoeridae sp., Caviidae sp., Erethizontidae sp., Pampatheriidae sp., Megatheriidae sp., Glyptodontidae sp., Proterotheriidae sp., Camelidae sp., Myliobatidae sp., Pristidae sp., Carcharhinidae sp., Sphyrnidae sp., Megalonychidae n. gen. & sp., Mylodontidae n. gen. & sp., Scelidotheriinae n. gen. & sp.		
Cenozoic	Piacenzian	Ware Fm. (3.4-2.78 Ma)	Cocinetas Basin	La Guajira	Pliomegatherium lelongi, Nothrotherium sp.		
Cenozoic	Late Miocene	Honda Gp. Cerbatana Mb.	La Venta	Huila	Geochelone hesterna		
Cenozoic	Serravallian (Laventan)	Honda Gp. Villavieja Fm. (17.0-12.1 Ma); La Victoria Fm. (13.82-12.38 Ma)	La Venta	Huila; Tolima	Lycopsis longirostrus		
Cenozoic	Serravallian (Laventan)	Honda Gp. Villavieja Fm. (17.0-12.1 Ma); La Victoria Fm. (13.82-12.38 Ma)	La Venta	Huila; Tolima	Dukecynus magnus		
Cenozoic	Serravallian (Laventan)	Honda Gp. Villavieja Fm. (17.0-12.1 Ma); La Victoria Fm. (13.82-12.38 Ma)	La Venta	Huila; Tolima	Huilatherium pluriplicatum		
Cenozoic	Serravallian (Laventan)	Honda Gp. Villavieja Fm. (17.0-12.1 Ma); La Victoria Fm. (13.82-12.38 Ma)	La Venta	Huila; Tolima	Granastrapotherium snorki		
Cenozoic	Serravallian (Laventan)	Honda Gp. Villavieja Fm. (17.0-12.1 Ma); La Victoria Fm. (13.82-12.38 Ma)	La Venta	Huila; Tolima	Hapalops sp.		
Cenozoic	Serravallian (Laventan)	Honda Gp. Villavieja Fm. (17.0-12.1 Ma); La Victoria Fm. (13.82-12.38 Ma)	La Venta	Huila; Tolima	Anachlysictis gracilis		
Cenozoic	Serravallian (Laventan)	Honda Gp. Villavieja Fm. (17.0-12.1 Ma); La Victoria Fm. (13.82-12.38 Ma)	La Venta	Huila; Tolima	Theosodon sp.		
Cenozoic	Serravallian (Laventan)	Honda Gp. Villavieja Fm. (17.0-12.1 Ma); La Victoria Fm. (13.82-12.38 Ma)	La Venta	Huila; Tolima	Hilarcotherium castanedaii		
Cenozoic	Serravallian (Laventan)	Honda Gp. Villavieja Fm. (17.0-12.1 Ma); La Victoria Fm. (13.82-12.38 Ma)	La Venta	Huila; Tolima	Purussaurus neivensis		
Cenozoic	Serravallian (Laventan)	Honda Gp. Villavieja Fm. (17.0-12.1 Ma); La Victoria Fm. (13.82-12.38 Ma)	La Venta	Huila; Tolima	Sebecus huilensis		
Cenozoic	Serravallian (Laventan)	Honda Gp. Villavieja Fm. (17.0-12.1 Ma); La Victoria Fm. (13.82-12.38 Ma)	La Venta	Huila; Tolima	Charactosuchus fieldsi		
Cenozoic	Serravallian (Laventan)	Honda Gp. Villavieja Fm. (17.0-12.1 Ma); La Victoria Fm. (13.82-12.38 Ma)	La Venta	Huila; Tolima	Chelus colombiana		
Cenozoic	Serravallian (Laventan)	Honda Gp. Villavieja Fm. (17.0-12.1 Ma); La Victoria Fm. (13.82-12.38 Ma)	La Venta	Huila; Tolima	Colombophis portai		
Cenozoic	Serravallian (Laventan)	Honda Gp. Villavieja Fm. (17.0-12.1 Ma); La Victoria Fm. (13.82-12.38 Ma)	La Venta	Huila; Tolima	Dracaena colombiana (syn. Paradracaena colombiana)		
Cenozoic	Serravallian (Laventan)	Honda Gp. Villavieja Fm. (17.0-12.1 Ma); La Victoria Fm. (13.82-12.38 Ma)	La Venta	Huila; Tolima	?Eunectes stirtoni		
Cenozoic	Serravallian (Laventan)	Honda Gp. Villavieja Fm. (17.0-12.1 Ma); La Victoria Fm. (13.82-12.38 Ma)	La Venta	Huila; Tolima	Gryposuchus colombianus		
Cenozoic	Serravallian (Laventan)	Honda Gp. Villavieja Fm. (17.0-12.1 Ma); La Victoria Fm. (13.82-12.38 Ma)	La Venta	Huila; Tolima	Mourasuchus atopus		
Cenozoic	Serravallian (Laventan)	Honda Gp. Villavieja Fm. (17.0-12.1 Ma); La Victoria Fm. (13.82-12.38 Ma)	La Venta	Huila; Tolima	Colossoma macropomum, Lepidosiren paradoxa, cf. Acanthicus, Arapaima sp., Brachyplatystoma cf. B. vaillanti, Brachyplatystoma promagdalena, cf. Corydoras sp., Hoplias sp., cf. Hoplosternum, Hydrolycus sp., Phractocephalus hemiliopterus, Serrasalmus sp., Pygocentrus sp., or Pristobrycon sp. (cf. Myletes sp.), Ariidae gen. et. sp. Incertae sedis, Characidae cf. Tetragonopterinae gen. et. sp., Cichlidae gen. et. sp. Incertae sedis, Doradidae gen. et. sp. Incertae sedis 1-3, Loricariidae gen. et. sp. Incertae sedis 1 & 2, Potamotrygonidae		
Cenozoic	Serravallian (Laventan)	Honda Gp. Villavieja Fm. (17.0-12.1 Ma); La Victoria Fm. (13.82-12.38 Ma)	La Venta	Huila; Tolima	Sylviocarcinus piriformis		
Cenozoic	Serravallian (Laventan)	Honda Gp. Villavieja Fm. (17.0-12.1 Ma); La Victoria Fm. (13.82-12.38 Ma)	La Venta	Huila; Tolima	Hoazinoides magdalenae		
Cenozoic	Serravallian (Laventan)	Honda Gp. Villavieja Fm. (17.0-12.1 Ma); La Victoria Fm. (13.82-12.38 Ma)	La Venta	Huila; Tolima	Galbula hylochoreutes		
Cenozoic	Serravallian (Laventan)	Honda Gp. Villavieja Fm. (17.0-12.1 Ma); La Victoria Fm. (13.82-12.38 Ma)	La Venta	Huila; Tolima	Aramus paludigrus		
Cenozoic	Serravallian (Laventan)	Honda Gp. Villavieja Fm. (17.0-12.1 Ma); La Victoria Fm. (13.82-12.38 Ma)	La Venta	Huila; Tolima	Aotus dindensis		
Cenozoic	Serravallian (Laventan)	Honda Gp. Villavieja Fm. (17.0-12.1 Ma); La Victoria Fm. (13.82-12.38 Ma)	La Venta	Huila; Tolima	Nuciruptor rubricae		
Cenozoic	Serravallian (Laventan)	Honda Gp. Villavieja Fm. (17.0-12.1 Ma); La Victoria Fm. (13.82-12.38 Ma)	La Venta	Huila; Tolima	Stirtonia tatacoensis (syn. Kondous laventicus)		
Cenozoic	Serravallian (Laventan)	Honda Gp. Villavieja Fm. (17.0-12.1 Ma); La Victoria Fm. (13.82-12.38 Ma)	La Venta	Huila; Tolima	Stirtonia victoriae		
Cenozoic	Serravallian (Laventan)	Honda Gp. Villavieja Fm. (17.0-12.1 Ma); La Victoria Fm. (13.82-12.38 Ma)	La Venta	Huila; Tolima	Hondadelphys fieldsi		
Cenozoic	Serravallian (Laventan)	Honda Gp. Villavieja Fm. (17.0-12.1 Ma); La Victoria Fm. (13.82-12.38 Ma)	La Venta	Huila; Tolima	Neotamandua borealis		
Cenozoic	Serravallian (Laventan)	Honda Gp. Villavieja Fm. (17.0-12.1 Ma); La Victoria Fm. (13.82-12.38 Ma)	La Venta	Huila; Tolima	Patasola magdalenae		
Cenozoic	Serravallian (Laventan)	Honda Gp. Villavieja Fm. (17.0-12.1 Ma); La Victoria Fm. (13.82-12.38 Ma)	La Venta	Huila; Tolima	Potamosiren magdalenensis		
Cenozoic	Serravallian (Laventan)	Honda Gp. Villavieja Fm. (17.0-12.1 Ma); La Victoria Fm. (13.82-12.38 Ma)	La Venta	Huila; Tolima	Xenastrapotherium kraglievichi		
Cenozoic	Serravallian (Laventan)	Honda Gp. Villavieja Fm. (17.0-12.1 Ma); La Victoria Fm. (13.82-12.38 Ma)	La Venta	Huila; Tolima	Cebupithecia sarmientoi		
Cenozoic	Serravallian (Laventan)	Honda Gp. Villavieja Fm. (17.0-12.1 Ma); La Victoria Fm. (13.82-12.38 Ma)	La Venta	Huila; Tolima	Lagonimico conclucatus		
Cenozoic	Serravallian (Laventan)	Honda Gp. Villavieja Fm. (17.0-12.1 Ma); La Victoria Fm. (13.82-12.38 Ma)	La Venta	Huila; Tolima	Micodon kiotensis		
Cenozoic	Serravallian (Laventan)	Honda Gp. Villavieja Fm. (17.0-12.1 Ma); La Victoria Fm. (13.82-12.38 Ma)	La Venta	Huila; Tolima	Miocallicebus villaviejai		
Cenozoic	Serravallian (Laventan)	Honda Gp. Villavieja Fm. (17.0-12.1 Ma); La Victoria Fm. (13.82-12.38 Ma)	La Venta	Huila; Tolima	Mohanamico hershkovitzi		
Cenozoic	Serravallian (Laventan)	Honda Gp. Villavieja Fm. (17.0-12.1 Ma); La Victoria Fm. (13.82-12.38 Ma)	La Venta	Huila; Tolima	Neosaimiri annectens (syn. Laventiana annectens)		
Cenozoic	Serravallian (Laventan)	Honda Gp. Villavieja Fm. (17.0-12.1 Ma); La Victoria Fm. (13.82-12.38 Ma)	La Venta	Huila; Tolima	Neosaimiri fieldsi		
Cenozoic	Serravallian (Laventan)	Honda Gp. Villavieja Fm. (17.0-12.1 Ma); La Victoria Fm. (13.82-12.38 Ma)	La Venta	Huila; Tolima	Pachybiotherium minor		
Cenozoic	Serravallian (Laventan)	Honda Gp. Villavieja Fm. (17.0-12.1 Ma); La Victoria Fm. (13.82-12.38 Ma)	La Venta	Huila; Tolima	Micoureus laventicus		
Cenozoic	Serravallian (Laventan)	Honda Gp. Villavieja Fm. (17.0-12.1 Ma); La Victoria Fm. (13.82-12.38 Ma)	La Venta	Huila; Tolima	Thylamys colombianus		
Cenozoic	Serravallian (Laventan)	Honda Gp. Villavieja Fm. (17.0-12.1 Ma); La Victoria Fm. (13.82-12.38 Ma)	La Venta	Huila; Tolima	Thylamys minutus		
Cenozoic	Serravallian (Laventan)	Honda Gp. Villavieja Fm. (17.0-12.1 Ma); La Victoria Fm. (13.82-12.38 Ma)	La Venta	Huila; Tolima	Hondathentes cazador		
Cenozoic	Serravallian (Laventan)	Honda Gp. Villavieja Fm. (17.0-12.1 Ma); La Victoria Fm. (13.82-12.38 Ma)	La Venta	Huila; Tolima	Pitheculites chenche		
Cenozoic	Serravallian (Laventan)	Honda Gp. Villavieja Fm. (17.0-12.1 Ma); La Victoria Fm. (13.82-12.38 Ma)	La Venta	Huila; Tolima	Anadasypus hondanus		
Cenozoic	Serravallian (Laventan)	Honda Gp. Villavieja Fm. (17.0-12.1 Ma); La Victoria Fm. (13.82-12.38 Ma)	La Venta	Huila; Tolima	Pedrolypeutes praecursor		
Cenozoic	Serravallian (Laventan)	Honda Gp. Villavieja Fm. (17.0-12.1 Ma); La Victoria Fm. (13.82-12.38 Ma)	La Venta	Huila; Tolima	Nanoastegotherium prostatum		
Cenozoic	Serravallian (Laventan)	Honda Gp. Villavieja Fm. (17.0-12.1 Ma); La Victoria Fm. (13.82-12.38 Ma)	La Venta	Huila; Tolima	Scirrotherium hondaensis		
Cenozoic	Serravallian (Laventan)	Honda Gp. Villavieja Fm. (17.0-12.1 Ma); La Victoria Fm. (13.82-12.38 Ma)	La Venta	Huila; Tolima	Boreostemma gigantea (syn. Asterostemma)		
Cenozoic	Serravallian (Laventan)	Honda Gp. Villavieja Fm. (17.0-12.1 Ma); La Victoria Fm. (13.82-12.38 Ma)	La Venta	Huila; Tolima	Boreostemma acostae (syn. Asterostemma)		
Cenozoic	Serravallian (Laventan)	Honda Gp. Villavieja Fm. (17.0-12.1 Ma); La Victoria Fm. (13.82-12.38 Ma)	La Venta	Huila; Tolima	Neoglyptatelus originalis		
Cenozoic	Serravallian (Laventan)	Honda Gp. Villavieja Fm. (17.0-12.1 Ma); La Victoria Fm. (13.82-12.38 Ma)	La Venta	Huila; Tolima	Brievabradys laventensis		
Cenozoic	Serravallian (Laventan)	Honda Gp. Villavieja Fm. (17.0-12.1 Ma); La Victoria Fm. (13.82-12.38 Ma)	La Venta	Huila; Tolima	Huilabradys magdaleniensis		
Cenozoic	Serravallian (Laventan)	Honda Gp. Villavieja Fm. (17.0-12.1 Ma); La Victoria Fm. (13.82-12.38 Ma)	La Venta	Huila; Tolima	Pseudoprepotherium confusum		
Cenozoic	Serravallian (Laventan)	Honda Gp. Villavieja Fm. (17.0-12.1 Ma); La Victoria Fm. (13.82-12.38 Ma)	La Venta	Huila; Tolima	Neonematherium flabellatum		
Cenozoic	Serravallian (Laventan)	Honda Gp. Villavieja Fm. (17.0-12.1 Ma); La Victoria Fm. (13.82-12.38 Ma)	La Venta	Huila; Tolima	Microsteiromys jacobsi		
Cenozoic	Serravallian (Laventan)	Honda Gp. Villavieja Fm. (17.0-12.1 Ma); La Victoria Fm. (13.82-12.38 Ma)	La Venta	Huila; Tolima	Neoreomys huilensis		
Cenozoic	Serravallian (Laventan)	Honda Gp. Villavieja Fm. (17.0-12.1 Ma); La Victoria Fm. (13.82-12.38 Ma)	La Venta	Huila; Tolima	Microscleromys paradoxalis		
Cenozoic	Serravallian (Laventan)	Honda Gp. Villavieja Fm. (17.0-12.1 Ma); La Victoria Fm. (13.82-12.38 Ma)	La Venta	Huila; Tolima	Microscleromys cribiphilus		
Cenozoic	Serravallian (Laventan)	Honda Gp. Villavieja Fm. (17.0-12.1 Ma); La Victoria Fm. (13.82-12.38 Ma)	La Venta	Huila; Tolima	Rhodanodolichotis antepridiana		
Cenozoic	Serravallian (Laventan)	Honda Gp. Villavieja Fm. (17.0-12.1 Ma); La Victoria Fm. (13.82-12.38 Ma)	La Venta	Huila; Tolima	Scleromys colombianus		
Cenozoic	Serravallian (Laventan)	Honda Gp. Villavieja Fm. (17.0-12.1 Ma); La Victoria Fm. (13.82-12.38 Ma)	La Venta	Huila; Tolima	Scleromys schurmanni		
Cenozoic	Serravallian (Laventan)	Honda Gp. Villavieja Fm. (17.0-12.1 Ma); La Victoria Fm. (13.82-12.38 Ma)	La Venta	Huila; Tolima	Prodolichotis pridiana		
Cenozoic	Serravallian (Laventan)	Honda Gp. Villavieja Fm. (17.0-12.1 Ma); La Victoria Fm. (13.82-12.38 Ma)	La Venta	Huila; Tolima	Acarechimys minutissimus		
Cenozoic	Serravallian (Laventan)	Honda Gp. Villavieja Fm. (17.0-12.1 Ma); La Victoria Fm. (13.82-12.38 Ma)	La Venta	Huila; Tolima	Ricardomys longidens		
Cenozoic	Serravallian (Laventan)	Honda Gp. Villavieja Fm. (17.0-12.1 Ma); La Victoria Fm. (13.82-12.38 Ma)	La Venta	Huila; Tolima	Prolicaphrium sanalfolsensis		
Cenozoic	Serravallian (Laventan)	Honda Gp. Villavieja Fm. (17.0-12.1 Ma); La Victoria Fm. (13.82-12.38 Ma)	La Venta	Huila; Tolima	Prothoatherium colombianus		
Cenozoic	Serravallian (Laventan)	Honda Gp. Villavieja Fm. (17.0-12.1 Ma); La Victoria Fm. (13.82-12.38 Ma)	La Venta	Huila; Tolima	Megadolodus molariformis		
Cenozoic	Serravallian (Laventan)	Honda Gp. Villavieja Fm. (17.0-12.1 Ma); La Victoria Fm. (13.82-12.38 Ma)	La Venta	Huila; Tolima	Villarroelia totoyoi		
Cenozoic	Serravallian (Laventan)	Honda Gp. Villavieja Fm. (17.0-12.1 Ma); La Victoria Fm. (13.82-12.38 Ma)	La Venta	Huila; Tolima	Pericotoxodon platignathus		
Cenozoic	Serravallian (Laventan)	Honda Gp. Villavieja Fm. (17.0-12.1 Ma); La Victoria Fm. (13.82-12.38 Ma)	La Venta	Huila; Tolima	Miocochilius anomopodus		
Cenozoic	Serravallian (Laventan)	Honda Gp. Villavieja Fm. (17.0-12.1 Ma); La Victoria Fm. (13.82-12.38 Ma)	La Venta	Huila; Tolima	Notonycteris magdalenensis		
Cenozoic	Serravallian (Laventan)	Honda Gp. Villavieja Fm. (17.0-12.1 Ma); La Victoria Fm. (13.82-12.38 Ma)	La Venta	Huila; Tolima	Notonycteris sucharadeus		
Cenozoic	Serravallian (Laventan)	Honda Gp. Villavieja Fm. (17.0-12.1 Ma); La Victoria Fm. (13.82-12.38 Ma)	La Venta	Huila; Tolima	Palynephyllum antimaster		
Cenozoic	Serravallian (Laventan)	Honda Gp. Villavieja Fm. (17.0-12.1 Ma); La Victoria Fm. (13.82-12.38 Ma)	La Venta	Huila; Tolima	Mormopterus colombiensis		
Cenozoic	Serravallian (Laventan)	Honda Gp. Villavieja Fm. (17.0-12.1 Ma); La Victoria Fm. (13.82-12.38 Ma)	La Venta	Huila; Tolima	Potamops mascahehenes		
Cenozoic	Serravallian (Laventan)	Honda Gp. Villavieja Fm. (17.0-12.1 Ma); La Victoria Fm. (13.82-12.38 Ma)	La Venta	Huila; Tolima	Kiotomops lopezi		
Cenozoic	Serravallian (Laventan)	Honda Gp. Villavieja Fm. (17.0-12.1 Ma); La Victoria Fm. (13.82-12.38 Ma)	La Venta	Huila; Tolima	Diclidurus sp.		
Cenozoic	Serravallian (Laventan)	Honda Gp. Villavieja Fm. (17.0-12.1 Ma); La Victoria Fm. (13.82-12.38 Ma)	La Venta	Huila; Tolima	Eumops sp.		
Cenozoic	Serravallian (Laventan)	Honda Gp. Villavieja Fm. (17.0-12.1 Ma); La Victoria Fm. (13.82-12.38 Ma)	La Venta	Huila; Tolima	Olenopsis sp.		
Cenozoic	Serravallian (Laventan)	Honda Gp. Villavieja Fm. (17.0-12.1 Ma); La Victoria Fm. (13.82-12.38 Ma)	La Venta	Huila; Tolima	?Steiromys sp.		
Cenozoic	Serravallian (Laventan)	Honda Gp. Villavieja Fm. (17.0-12.1 Ma); La Victoria Fm. (13.82-12.38 Ma)	La Venta	Huila; Tolima	Tonatia sp. or Lophostoma sp.		
Cenozoic	Serravallian (Laventan)	Honda Gp. Villavieja Fm. (17.0-12.1 Ma); La Victoria Fm. (13.82-12.38 Ma)	La Venta	Huila; Tolima	Dolichotinae sp.		
Cenozoic	Serravallian (Laventan)	Honda Gp. Villavieja Fm. (17.0-12.1 Ma); La Victoria Fm. (13.82-12.38 Ma)	La Venta	Huila; Tolima	Megatheriinae sp.		
Cenozoic	Serravallian (Laventan)	Honda Gp. Villavieja Fm. (17.0-12.1 Ma); La Victoria Fm. (13.82-12.38 Ma)	La Venta	Huila; Tolima	Nothrotheriinae sp.		
Cenozoic	Serravallian (Laventan)	Honda Gp. Villavieja Fm. (17.0-12.1 Ma); La Victoria Fm. (13.82-12.38 Ma)	La Venta	Huila; Tolima	?Echimyidae sp.		
Cenozoic	Serravallian (Laventan)	Honda Gp. Villavieja Fm. (17.0-12.1 Ma); La Victoria Fm. (13.82-12.38 Ma)	La Venta	Huila; Tolima	cane toad (Bufo marinus)		
Cenozoic	Serravallian (Laventan)	Honda Gp. Villavieja Fm. (17.0-12.1 Ma); La Victoria Fm. (13.82-12.38 Ma)	La Venta	Huila; Tolima	lesser bulldog bat (Noctilio albiventris)		
Cenozoic	Serravallian (Laventan)	Honda Gp. Villavieja Fm. (17.0-12.1 Ma); La Victoria Fm. (13.82-12.38 Ma)	La Venta	Huila; Tolima	LaVal's disk-winged bat (Thyroptera lavali)		
Cenozoic	Serravallian (Laventan)	Honda Gp. Villavieja Fm. (17.0-12.1 Ma); La Victoria Fm. (13.82-12.38 Ma)	La Venta	Huila; Tolima	Thyroptera robusta		
Cenozoic	Serravallian (Laventan)	Honda Gp. Villavieja Fm. (17.0-12.1 Ma); La Victoria Fm. (13.82-12.38 Ma)	La Venta	Huila; Tolima	Spix's disk-winged bat (Thyroptera tricolor)		
Cenozoic	Serravallian (Laventan)	Sincelejo Fm.	Calle Fría-Segovia	Sucre	Neoglyptatelus sincelejanus		
Cenozoic	Langhian	Castilletes Fm. (16.7-14.2 Ma)	Cocinetas Basin	La Guajira	Lycopsis padillai, ?Hyperleptus sp., Astrapotheriidae, Odontoceti, Mysticeti, Glyptodontidae, Pampatheriidae, Macraucheniidae, Proterotheriidae, Leontinidae, Toxodontidae, Interatheriidae, Megatheriidae, Dinomyidae, Sirenia, Sparassodonta, Aves indet.		
Cenozoic	Langhian	Castilletes Fm. (16.7-14.2 Ma)	Cocinetas Basin	La Guajira	Chelus colombiana, Chelus sp., Chelonoidis sp., cf. Crocodylus sp., cf. Mourasuchus sp., cf. Purussaurus sp., Alligatoridae gen. et sp. indet., Boidae, Crocodylidae gen et sp. indet., cf. Eusuchia gen et sp. indet., Gavialoidea gen. et sp. indet., Podocnemididae incertae sedis		
Cenozoic	Langhian	Castilletes Fm. (16.7-14.2 Ma)	Cocinetas Basin	La Guajira	Characidae, Serrasalmidae, Sciaenidae, Sparidae, Sphyraenidae, Ariidae, Callichthyidae, Doradidae, Pimelodidae, Carcharhinidae, Hemigaleidae, Sphyrnidae, Lamnidae, Otodontidae, Dasyatidae, Myliobatidae, Rhinopteridae, Ginglymostomatidae, Pristiophoridae, Pristidae, Rhynchobatidae, Rhynobatidae, Lepidosirenidae		
Cenozoic	Langhian	Castilletes Fm. (16.7-14.2 Ma)	Cocinetas Basin	La Guajira	Calliostoma sp., Arene sp., Nerita cf. fulgurans, Neritina n. sp. aff. woodwadi, Modulus tamanensis, Turritella (Bactrospira) sp. cf. altilira, Turritella (Turritella) cocoditana, Turritella (Turritella) machapoorensis, Turritella (Turritella) matarucana, Architectonica (Architectonica) nobilis, Bittium sp., Rhinoclavis (Ochetoclava) venada, Potamides suprasulcatus, Terebralia dentilabris, Petaloconchus sculpturatus, Bostrycapulus sp., Crepidula cantaurana, Crepidula insculpta, Crepidula plana, Calyptraea sp. cf. centralis, Crucibulum (Dispotaea) sp. cf. springvaleense, Aylacostoma n. sp., Doryssa n. sp., Sheppardiconcha n. sp., Charadreon n. sp., Natica sp., Naticarius sp., Glossaulax paraguanensis, Polinices sp. cf. nelsoni, Sinum gabbi, Stigmaulax sp., Strombus sp., Malea sp., Bursa rugosa, Ficus sp. cf. carbasea, Distorsio sp., Chicoreus (Triplex) sp. cf. cornurectus, Chicoreus (Triplex) corrigendum, Luria sp., Muracypraea sp. cf. hyaena, Calotrophon sp. cf. gatunensis, Cymia cocoditana, Eupleura kugleri, Hesperisternia sp., Phyllonotus n. sp., Siphonochelus (Laevityphis) cf. sawkinsi, Siratus cf. denegatus, Vokesimurex sp. cf. gilli, Antillophos sp. cf. gatunensis, Cymatophos cocoditana, Cymatophos paraguanensis, Gordanops sp. cf. baranoanus, Pallacera maracaibensis, Solenosteira sp., Granolaria sp. cf. gorgasiana, Latirus sp., Nassarius sp., Turbinella falconensis, Melongena consors, Anachis sp., Sincola sp., Strombina sp., Persicula venezuelana, Prunum quirosense, Agaronia sp. aff. testacea, Oliva sp., Aphera sp., Bivetiella sp. cf. gabbiana, Euclia sp. cf. dinota, Euclia werenfelsi, Narona sp., Trigonostoma woodringi, Conus sp. aff. jaspideus, Agladrillia sp., Crassispira conica, Fusiturricula sp., Gemmula vaningeni, Glyphostoma dentiferum, Paraborsonia cantaurana, "Chiton" sp., Saccella gnomon, Noetia dauleana, Bulla sp., Crenella sp., Brachidontes sp., Atrina sp., Argopecten sp., Anadara (Rasia) democraciana, Anadara (Rasia) tirantensis, Conus sp. cf. chipolanus, Conus sp. cf. molis, Conus talis, Strioterebrum ulloa, Terebra (Paraterebra) sulcifera, Clathrodrillia sp., Cruziturricula sp., Hindsiclava henekeni, Knefastia sp., Polystira sp., Adrana sp., Politoleda forcati, Anadara (Cunearca) zuliana, Anadara (Grandiarca) chiriquiensis, Anadara (Potiarca) inutilis, Anadara (Rasia) sp. cf. cornellana, Anadara (Tosarca) sp. cf. veatchi, Tucetona sp. cf. democraciana, Mytilus sp. cf. canoasensis, Anomia peruviana, Cavilinga sp., Lucinisca mirandana, Diplodonta sp., Harvella elegans, Mulinia sp., Raeta sp., Angulus sp., ?Macoma sp., Strigilla sp., Leopecten sp., Lindapecten buchivacoanus, Crassostrea sp., Dendostrea democraciana, Plicatula sp., Anodontia sp., Lucina sp. cf. pensylvanica, Phacoides sp. cf. pectinatus, Glyptoactis paraguanensis, Arcinella yaquensis, Chama berjadinensis, Dallocardia sp. cf. sanctidavidis, Apiocardia n. sp. aff. aminensis, Crassinella sp., Eucrassatella (Hybolophus) venezuelana, Micromactra maracaibensis, Eurytellina paraguanensis, Psammacoma falconensis, Psammotreta hadra, Donax sp., Tagelus (Mesopleura) n. sp. aff. divisus, Solecurtus sp., Solena sp., Abra sp., Agriopoma (Pitarella) paraguanensis, Hysteroconcha sp., Leukoma sp., Pitar sp., Transennella sp., Tenuicorbula n. sp. aff. lupina, Semele sp., Chione sp., Chionopsis paraguanensis, Clementia dariena, Cyclinella venezuelana, Dosinia sp., Lamelliconcha labreana, Lirophora quirosensis, Macrocallista n. sp. aff. maculata, Panchione n. sp. aff. macrtropsis, Caryocorbula fortis, Caryocorbula quirosana, Hexacorbula cruziana, Dentalium sp., Balanidae indet., Buccinidae indet., Callianassidae indet., Pectinidae indet., Portunidae indet., Ranellidae indet., Sphaeriidae indet., Sportellidae indet., Tellinidae indet., Turridae indet., Unioidae indet., Veneridae indet.		
Cenozoic	Burdigalian	Castilletes Fm. (16.7-14.2 Ma)	Cocinetas Basin	La Guajira			
Cenozoic	Miocene	Honda Gp.	Coyaima	Tolima	Granastrapotherium snorki, Sebecus sp., Gavialis sp., Cochilius sp., Miocochilis sp., Scleromys sp., Dasypodidae sp., Leontiniidae sp., Megalonychidae sp., Toxodontidae sp.		
Cenozoic	Late Oligocene	Honda Gp.	Coyaima	Tolima	Granastrapotherium snorki, Sebecus sp., Gavialis sp., Cochilius sp., Miocochilis sp., Scleromys sp., Dasypodidae sp., Leontiniidae sp., Megalonychidae sp., Toxodontidae sp.		
Cenozoic	Early Oligocene		Pedeyita, Cartagena del Chairá	Caquetá	Eosteiromys sp.		
Cenozoic	Early Oligocene	Barzalosa Fm.	Alto San Jose, Chaparral	Tolima	Balanerodus logimus		
Cenozoic	Early Oligocene	Barzalosa Fm.	Alto San Jose, Chaparral	Tolima	Lophiodolodus chaparralensis		
Cenozoic	Early Oligocene	Barzalosa Fm.	Alto San Jose, Chaparral	Tolima	Xenastrapotherium chaparralensis		
Cenozoic	Early Oligocene	Barzalosa Fm.	Alto San Jose, Chaparral	Tolima	Protheosodon sp.		
Cenozoic	Early Oligocene	Barzalosa Fm.	Alto San Jose, Chaparral	Tolima	Proadinotherium sp.		
Cenozoic	Late Eocene	Gualanday Gp.	Alto San Jose, Chaparral	Tolima	Colombitherium tolimense		
Cenozoic	Early Eocene	Bogotá Fm.	Ciudad Bolívar, Bogotá	Cundinamarca	Anemocardium margaritae, Etayoa bacatensis, Menispina evidens, Palaeoluna bogotensis, Stephania palaeosudamericana, Foveotriletes margaritae, Foveotricolpites perforatus, Hickeycarpum peltatum, Proxapertites operculatus, Ulmoideipites krempii, Carpolithus sp., Annonaceae sp., Arecaceae sp., Fabaceae sp., Lauraceae sp., Malvaceae sp., Salicaceae sp., Salvinia sp., Theaceae sp., many still unnamed		
Cenozoic	Mid Paleocene	Bogotá Fm.	Ciudad Bolívar, Bogotá	Cundinamarca	Anemocardium margaritae, Etayoa bacatensis, Menispina evidens, Palaeoluna bogotensis, Stephania palaeosudamericana, Foveotriletes margaritae, Foveotricolpites perforatus, Hickeycarpum peltatum, Proxapertites operculatus, Ulmoideipites krempii, Carpolithus sp., Annonaceae sp., Arecaceae sp., Fabaceae sp., Lauraceae sp., Malvaceae sp., Salicaceae sp., Salvinia sp., Theaceae sp., many still unnamed		
Cenozoic	Mid Paleocene	Cerrejón Fm.	Cerrejón	Cesar; La Guajira	Titanoboa cerrejonensis		
Cenozoic	Mid Paleocene	Cerrejón Fm.	Cerrejón	Cesar; La Guajira	Carbonemys cofrinii		
Cenozoic	Mid Paleocene	Cerrejón Fm.	Cerrejón	Cesar; La Guajira	Acherontisuchus guajiraensis		
Cenozoic	Mid Paleocene	Cerrejón Fm.	Cerrejón	Cesar; La Guajira	Anthracosuchus balrogus		
Cenozoic	Mid Paleocene	Cerrejón Fm.	Cerrejón	Cesar; La Guajira	Cerrejonemys wayuunaiki		
Cenozoic	Mid Paleocene	Cerrejón Fm.	Cerrejón	Cesar; La Guajira	Cerrejonisuchus improcerus		
Cenozoic	Mid Paleocene	Cerrejón Fm.	Cerrejón	Cesar; La Guajira	Puentemys mushaisaensis		
Cenozoic	Mid Paleocene	Cerrejón Fm.	Cerrejón	Cesar; La Guajira	Aerofructus dillhoffi, Menispermites cerrejonensis, M. guajiraensis, Montrichardia aquatica, Petrocardium cerrejonense, P. wayuuorum, Stephania palaeosudamericana, Ulmoidicarpum tupperi, Acrostichum sp., Amaryllidaceae sp., Anacardiaceae sp., Annonaceae sp., Apocynaceae sp., Araceae sp., Arecaceae sp., Dicotyledonae sp., Elaeocarpaceae sp., Euphorbiaceae sp., Fabaceae sp., Lauraceae sp., Malvaceae sp., Malvoideae sp., Meliaceae sp., Monocotyledoneae sp., Moraceae sp., Pinales sp., Pteridophyta sp., Salicaceae sp., Salvinia sp., Sapotaceae sp., Stenochlaena sp., Sterculioideae sp., Violaceae sp., Zingiberales sp.		
Cenozoic	Mid Paleocene	Cerrejón Fm.	Cerrejón	Cesar; La Guajira	Proxapertites operculatus, Gemmatus phanocolpites gemmatus, Mauritidlites franciscoi, M. franciscoi var. pachyexinatus, Ctenolophonidites lisamae, Psilatriatriletes guaduensis, Foveotriletes cf. margaritae, Psilamonocolpites sp., Longapertites vaneenderburgi, Retidiporites magdalenensis		
Cenozoic	Mid Paleocene	Manantial Fm. Hato Nuevo Fm.	Ranchería Sub-basin	Cesar; La Guajira	Rzehakina epigona, Globorotalia conicotruncana, Globigerina eugubina, Fovetriletes margaritae, Psilatriletes guaduensis, P. martinensis, Zonotricolpites cf. variabilis, Proxapertites opercutatus, P. maracaiboensis, P. humbertoides, Psilabrevitricolpites marginatus, Ctenolophonidites sp.		
Cenozoic	Early Paleocene	Manantial Fm. Hato Nuevo Fm.	Ranchería Sub-basin	Cesar; La Guajira	Rzehakina epigona, Globorotalia conicotruncana, Globigerina eugubina, Fovetriletes margaritae, Psilatriletes guaduensis, P. martinensis, Zonotricolpites cf. variabilis, Proxapertites opercutatus, P. maracaiboensis, P. humbertoides, Psilabrevitricolpites marginatus, Ctenolophonidites sp.		
Cenozoic	Paleocene	Guaduas Fm.	Zipaquirá; Tasco	Cundinamarca; Boyacá	Archaeopaliurus boyacensis, Bacumorphomonocolpites tausae, Buttinia andreevi, Coussapoa camargoi, Echimonocolpites echiverrucatus, E. protofranciscoi, Ficus andrewsi, Foveotriletes margaritae, Geonomites zipaquirensis, Mauritiidites franciscoi, Proxapertites humbertoides, P. operculatus, Psilatriletes martinensis, Retimonocolpites claris, Retricolpites belskii, Scabrastephanocolpites guaduensis, Spinozonocolpites echinatus, S. tausae, Syncolporites lisamae, Zonotricolpites lineaus, Berhamniphyllum sp., Dinogymniun sp.		
Mesozoic	Maastrichtian	Guaduas Fm.	Zipaquirá; Tasco	Cundinamarca; Boyacá			
Mesozoic	Early Maastrichtian	Guadalupe Gp.	San Luis de Gaceno; Cucaita	Cundinamarca; Boyacá	Ophthalmoplax andina, ?Orthocarstenia clarki, ?O. cretacea, Ostrea tecticosta, Peroniceras (Gauthiericeras) bajuvaricum, Siphogenerinoides ewaldi		
Mesozoic	Santonian	Guadalupe Gp.	San Luis de Gaceno; Cucaita	Cundinamarca; Boyacá	Ophthalmoplax andina, ?Orthocarstenia clarki, ?O. cretacea, Ostrea tecticosta, Peroniceras (Gauthiericeras) bajuvaricum, Siphogenerinoides ewaldi		
Mesozoic	Maastrichtian	Molino Fm.	Cesar-Ranchería Basin	Cesar; La Guajira	Globotruncana fornicata, G. caniculata ventricosa, Globigerina cretacea, Gumbelina globulosa, G. excolta, Siphogenerinoides cretacea, S. bramlettei, Abathomphalus mayorensis, Guembelitria cretacea, Globorotruncanita conica, Gansserina gansseri, Racemiguembelina fructicosa, Heferohelix striata, H. navarroensis, Pseudoguembelina excolata, P. palpebra, Globotruncana aegyptiaca, Echitriporites suescae, Echimonocolpites ruedae, Foveotriletes margaritae, Mauritildites protofranciscoi, Psilatriletes guaduensis, Araucariacites sp., Rugutriletes sp., Proxapertites operculatus, P. psilatus, Spiniferites cf. ramosus, Achomosphaera sp., Dinogymnium sp.		
Mesozoic	Campanian	Molino Fm.	Cesar-Ranchería Basin	Cesar; La Guajira			
Mesozoic	Campanian	Oliní Gp.	Coello	Tolima	Eonatator coellensis		
Mesozoic	Santonian	Conejo Fm.	Toca; Cucaita	Boyacá	Archaeglobigerina blowi, Codazziceras scheibei, Dicarinella concavata, D. primitiva, Gloriaceras correai, Heterohelix globulosa, H. reussi, Lenticeras baltai, Marginotruncana angusticarenata, M. sp. ct. M. renzi, M. sp. cf. M. sinuosa, Protexamites cucaitaense, Protopholoe colombiana, Rosita tornicata, Sigalitruncana sigali, Whiteinella inornata, Baculites sp., Barroisiceras sp., Exogyra sp., Hedbergella sp., Peroniceras sp., Pryonocicloceras sp.		
Mesozoic	Turonian	Conejo Fm.	Toca; Cucaita	Boyacá	Archaeglobigerina blowi, Codazziceras scheibei, Dicarinella concavata, D. primitiva, Gloriaceras correai, Heterohelix globulosa, H. reussi, Lenticeras baltai, Marginotruncana angusticarenata, M. sp. ct. M. renzi, M. sp. cf. M. sinuosa, Protexamites cucaitaense, Protopholoe colombiana, Rosita tornicata, Sigalitruncana sigali, Whiteinella inornata, Baculites sp., Barroisiceras sp., Exogyra sp., Hedbergella sp., Peroniceras sp., Pryonocicloceras sp.		
Mesozoic	Coniacian	La Luna Fm.	Sardinata; Aguachica; Lebrija; Cesar-Ranchería Basin	Norte de Santander; Santander; Cesar; La Guajira	Erichsenites mirabilis, Niceforoceras sp., Paralenticeras sp., Neoptychites sp., Holitoides sp., Fagesia sp., Prothocantoceras sp., Eucalycoceras sp., Cloleopoceras sp., Baroisiceras sp., Prionotropis sp., Baculites sp., Tissotis sp., Perinoceras aff. moureti, Whiteinella archeocretacea		
Mesozoic	Turonian	La Luna Fm.	Sardinata; Aguachica; Lebrija; Cesar-Ranchería Basin	Norte de Santander; Santander; Cesar; La Guajira	Erichsenites mirabilis, Niceforoceras sp., Paralenticeras sp., Neoptychites sp., Holitoides sp., Fagesia sp., Prothocantoceras sp., Eucalycoceras sp., Cloleopoceras sp., Baroisiceras sp., Prionotropis sp., Baculites sp., Tissotis sp., Perinoceras aff. moureti, Whiteinella archeocretacea		
Mesozoic	Turonian	La Frontera Fm.	Yaguará	Huila	Yaguarasaurus columbianus		
Mesozoic	Turonian	La Frontera Fm.		Boyacá; Cundinamarca; Huila	Anomia colombiana, Codazziceras ospinae, Coilopoceras cf. newelli, Hoplitoides ingens, H. cf. lagiraldae, H. wohltmanni, Kamerunoceras cf. turoniense, Neoptychites crassus, Vascoceras cf. constrictum, V. cf. venezolanum, Wrightoceras munieri, Inoceramus sp., Mammites sp., Prionocycloceras sp, ?Fagesia sp.		
Mesozoic	Coniacian	Loma Gorda Fm.	Aipe	Huila	Ankinatsytes venezolanus, Barroisiceras onilahyense, Codazziceras ospinae, Eulophoceras jacobi, Fagesia catinus, Hauericeras madagascarensis, Hoplitoides ingens, H. lagiraldae, Mitonia gracilis, Mytiloides kossmati, M. goppelnensis, M. scupini, Neoptychites cf. andinus, Paralenticeras sieversi, Paramammites sp., Peroniceras subtricarinatum, Prionocycloceras guayabanum, Reesidites subtuberculatum, Subprionotropis colombianus, Allocrioceras sp., Anagaudryceras sp., Anomia sp., Benueites sp., Choffaticeras sp., Dydimotis sp., Forresteria sp., Gauthiericeras sp., Morrowites sp., Nannovascoceras sp., Quitmaniceras sp.		
Mesozoic	Turonian	Loma Gorda Fm.	Aipe	Huila			
Mesozoic	Early Turonian	Otanche Fm.	Otanche	Boyacá	Crioceratites cf. apricus		
Mesozoic	Early Albian	Otanche Fm.	Otanche	Boyacá	Crioceratites cf. apricus		
Mesozoic	Turonian	Chipaque Fm.	Chipaque	Cundinamarca	Exogyra squamata, Ostrea syphax		
Mesozoic	Cenomanian	Chipaque Fm.	Chipaque	Cundinamarca	Exogyra squamata, Ostrea syphax		
Mesozoic	Turonian	San Rafael Fm.	Pesca; Samacá	Boyacá	Anomia colombiana, A. sp. cf. A. papyracea, Coilopoceras cf. lesseli, Hoplitoides cf. crassicostatus, H. cf. ingens, Kamerunoceras n. sp. aff. K. turoniense, Mammites nodosoidesappelatus, M. aff. afer, Mytiloides kossmati, M. mytiloides, M. subhercynicus, Ophthalmoplax spinosus, Paramammites cf. gracilis, Archaeoglobigerina sp., Clavihedbergella sp., Dicarinella sp., Globigerinelloides sp., Glyptoxoceras sp., Guembelitria sp., Hastigerinoides sp., Hedbergella sp., Helvetoglobotruncana sp., Heterohelix sp., Laeviheterohelix sp., Watinoceras sp., Whiteinella sp., Wrightoceras sp., ?Yubariceras sp.		
Mesozoic	Cenomanian	San Rafael Fm.	Pesca; Samacá	Boyacá			
Mesozoic	Late Cenomanian	Hondita Fm.	Aipe	Huila	Acanthoceras sp., Rhynchostreon sp.		
Mesozoic	Cenomanian	Aguas Blancas Fm.	Cesar-Ranchería Basin	Cesar; La Guajira	Ostrea scyfax, Exogyra toxaster, Choffatella decipiens, Cheloniceras sp., Pseudosaynella sp., Dufrenoyia sp., Turrulitas sp., Acanthoceras sp., ?Montelliceras sp., ?Calvoceras sp., Orbitolina conica texana, Heterohelix reussi, Marginotruncana sinuosa		
Mesozoic	Aptian	Aguas Blancas Fm.	Cesar-Ranchería Basin	Cesar; La Guajira	Ostrea scyfax, Exogyra toxaster, Choffatella decipiens, Cheloniceras sp., Pseudosaynella sp., Dufrenoyia sp., Turrulitas sp., Acanthoceras sp., ?Montelliceras sp., ?Calvoceras sp., Orbitolina conica texana, Heterohelix reussi, Marginotruncana sinuosa		
Mesozoic	Early Albian	Hiló Fm.	Prado	Tolima	Actinoceramus munsoni, A. aff. subsulcatiformis, Beudanticeras cf. rebouli, Desmoceras latidorsatum, Eubrancoceras cf. aegoceratoides, Exogyra aff. texana, Goodhallites aguilerae, Inoceramus anglicus, I. cf. cadottensis, I. aff. dunveganensis, I. aff. etheridgei, I. cf. ewaldi, I. aff. irenensis, I. prefragilis, I. cf. richensis, Lyelliceras pseudolyelli, Mojsisovicsia evansi, Mortoniceras arietiforme, Neocomiceramus neocomiensis, Neoharpoceras hugardianum, Oxytropidoceras intermedium, O. karsteni, O. laraense, O. multicostatum, O. nodosum, O. peruvianum, ?O. robustum, O. venezolanum, Prolyelliceras gevreyi, P. prorsocurvatum, Puzio media, Tegoceras mosense, Acompsoceras sp., ?Bositra sp., Camptonectes sp., Entolium sp., Hamites sp., Hysteroceras sp., Mariella sp., Ostrea sp., Phelopteria sp., ?Syncyclonema sp.		
Mesozoic	Early Albian	Capotes Fm.	Bituima	Cundinamarca	Douvilleiceras solitae, Neodeshayesites columbianus, Paracrioceras sp.		
Mesozoic	Barremian	Capotes Fm.	Bituima	Cundinamarca	Douvilleiceras solitae, Neodeshayesites columbianus, Paracrioceras sp.		
Mesozoic	Late Aptian	Yuruma Fm. Apón Fm.	South of Cuiza	La Guajira	Astarte cf. sieversi, Cheloniceras cf. subnodosocostatum, Crassatella cf. caudata, Cymatoceras perstriatum, Deshayesites aff. codazzianus, Hamites degenhardtii, Heinzia galeatoides, H. lindigii, H. aff. provincialis, Heteroceras cf. helicoceroides, Karsteniceras beyrichii, Nicklesia alicantensis, N. cf. colombiana, N. didayana, N. dumasiana, N. lenticulata, Parahoplites obliquus, Pedioceras caquesensis, P. undulatum, Phylloceras morelianum, P. velledae, Pinna robinaldina, Pseudoaustraliceras ramososeptatum, Pseudohaploceras aff. liptoviense, Psilotissotia maxima, Ptychoceras humboldtianum, Pulchellia caicedi, P. communis, P. elegans, P. fasciata, P. galeata, P. hettneri, P. multicostata, P. pseudokarsteni, P. radians, P. robusta, P. royoi, Trigonia tocaimaana, Valdedorsella inca, Zurcherella zurcheri, Colombiceras sp., Eogaudryceras sp., Exogyra sp., Paraspiticeras sp., Uhligella sp.		
Mesozoic	Early Barremian	Yuruma Fm. Apón Fm.	South of Cuiza	La Guajira			
Mesozoic	Late Aptian	Caballos Fm. Yaví Fm.	Alpujarra	Tolima	Araucarites sp., Brachyphyllum sp., Cladophlebis sp., Weichselia sp.		
Mesozoic	Late Aptian	El Peñón Fm.	El Peñón	Cundinamarca	Cheloniceras sp., Epicheloniceras sp. aff. carlosacostai		
Mesozoic	Late Aptian	Socotá Fm.	Útica	Cundinamarca	Acanthoplites (?) leptoceratiforme, Dufrenoyia sanctorum, Parahoplites (?) hubachi, Stoyanowiceras treffryanus		
Mesozoic	Aptian	Trincheras Fm.	Apulo	Cundinamarca	Heminautilus etheringtoni, Cheloniceras sp., Heinzia sp., Pseudohaploceras sp., bryozoans, molluscs, echinoids		
Mesozoic	Early Aptian	Une Fm. Caballos Fm.	Firavitoba; Payandé	Boyacá; Tolima	Heminautilus etheringtoni		
Mesozoic	Aptian	Paja Fm.	Villa de Leyva; Sáchica	Boyacá	Kronosaurus boyacensis		
Mesozoic	Aptian	Paja Fm.	Villa de Leyva; Sáchica	Boyacá	Callawayasaurus colombiensis		
Mesozoic	Aptian	Paja Fm.	Villa de Leyva; Sáchica	Boyacá	Padillasaurus leivaensis		
Mesozoic	Aptian	Paja Fm.	Villa de Leyva; Sáchica	Boyacá	Platypterygius sachicarum		
Mesozoic	Aptian	Paja Fm.	Villa de Leyva; Sáchica	Boyacá	Desmatochelys padillai		
Mesozoic	Aptian	Paja Fm.	Villa de Leyva; Sáchica	Boyacá	Brachauchenius sp.		
Mesozoic	Aptian	Paja Fm.	Villa de Leyva; Sáchica	Boyacá	Stenorhynchosaurus munozi		
Mesozoic	Aptian	Paja Fm.	Villa de Leyva; Sáchica	Boyacá	Muiscasaurus catheti		
Mesozoic	Aptian	Paja Fm.	Villa de Leyva; Sáchica	Boyacá	Leyvachelys cipadi		
Mesozoic	Aptian	Paja Fm.	Villa de Leyva; Sáchica	Boyacá	Bellcarcinus aptiensis, Cenomanocarcinus vanstraeleni, Colombicarcinus laevis, Joeranina colombiana, J. kerri, Notopocorystes kerri, Planocarcinus johnjagti, Rathbunassa gen. et sp. nov., Telamonocarcinus antiquus		
Mesozoic	Aptian	Paja Fm.	Villa de Leyva; Sáchica	Boyacá	Acanthoptychoceras triumphyi, Acrioceras julivertii, Ancyloceras vandenheckii velezianum, Buergliceras buerglii, Colchidites apolinari, C. breistrofferi, Crioceratites leivaensis, C. tener, C. aff. emerici, Frenelopsis cf. ramosissima, Karsteniceras beyrichi, Karsteniceras multicostatum sp. nov., Macroscaphites yvani disjuncticostatus, Monsalveiceras monsalvense, Nicklesia pulchella, Pedioceras asymmetricum, P. ubaquense, Protanisoceras creutzbergi, Pseudoaustraliceras columbiae, Pseudocrioceras simitiense, Pseudohaploceras incertum, Ptychoceras aff. puzosianum, Teredolites clavatus, Dufrenoyia sp., Gerhardtia sp., Heinzia sp., Olcostephanus sp., Phylloceras sp., Prodesheyesites sp., Pseudofrenelopsis sp., Pulchellia sp., Toxancycloceras sp., Valdedorsella sp.		
Mesozoic	Hauterivian	Paja Fm.	Chipatá	Santander	Hamiticeras chipatai		
Mesozoic	Hauterivian	Ritoque Fm.	Villa de Leyva	Boyacá	Valanginites santafecinus, Acanthodiscus sp., Favrella sp., Subastieria sp.		
Mesozoic	Hauterivian	Tibasosa Fm.	Arcabuco; Santa Rosa de Viterbo	Boyacá	Subsaynella boyacaensis n. sp., Thurmanniceras santarosanum n. sp., ?Pseudohaploceras sp.		
Mesozoic	Hauterivian	Rosablanca Fm.	Arenal del Sur; Simití; Socorro; Zapatoca	Bolívar; Santander	Diaulax rosablanca, Natica cf. bulimoides, Toxaster roulini, Trigonia transitoria quintucoensis, Acanthodiscus sp., Crioceras sp., Favrella sp., Hamulina sp., ?Kilianella sp., Nicklesia sp., Olcostephanus sp. Pseudohaploceras sp., Thurmanniceras sp.		
Mesozoic	Valanginian	Rosablanca Fm.	Arenal del Sur; Simití; Socorro; Zapatoca	Bolívar; Santander	Diaulax rosablanca, Natica cf. bulimoides, Toxaster roulini, Trigonia transitoria quintucoensis, Acanthodiscus sp., Crioceras sp., Favrella sp., Hamulina sp., ?Kilianella sp., Nicklesia sp., Olcostephanus sp. Pseudohaploceras sp., Thurmanniceras sp.		
Mesozoic	Valanginian	Murca Fm.	Ubalá; Labranzagrande	Cundinamarca; Boyacá	Berriasella colombiana, Leptoceras ublanese n. sp., Pseudoosterella ubalaensis		
Mesozoic	Berriasian	Murca Fm.	Ubalá; Labranzagrande	Cundinamarca; Boyacá	Berriasella colombiana, Leptoceras ublanese n. sp., Pseudoosterella ubalaensis		
Mesozoic	Early Berriasian	Arcabuco Fm.	Chíquiza	Boyacá	Dinosaur footprints		
Mesozoic	Tithonian	Arcabuco Fm.	Chíquiza	Boyacá	Dinosaur footprints		
Mesozoic	Late Jurassic	Valle Alto Fm.	San Félix, Salamina	Caldas	Piazopteris branneri, Cladophlebis sp., Classopollis sp., Ctenozamites sp., Desmiophyllum sp., Gleichenites sp., Nilssoniopteris sp., Otozamites sp., Pachypteris sp., Ptilophyllum sp., Rhabdoderas sp., Sagenopteris sp., Sandlingites sp., Sphenopteris sp., Substeuroceras sp., Trigonia sp., Zamites sp.		(Note: Piazopteris branneri listed as the Permian genus Glossopteris (branneri))
Mesozoic	Kimmeridgian	Coquina Gp. Jipi Fm.	Serranía de Cocinas	La Guajira	Adelocoenia dendroidea, Allocoenia trochiformis, Halysitastraea columbiana n. gen. n. sp., Stylina micrommata, Thamnasteria dendroidea, Calamophylliopsis sp., Calamophyllia sp., Heliocoenia sp., Isastrea sp., Pholadomya sp., Algae indet., Bryozoa indet., Gastropoda indet., Porifera indet.		
Mesozoic	Late Triassic	Saldaña Fm. Chicalá Mb.	Payandé, San Luis	Tolima	Cycloceltites cowichanensis, Lissonites canadensis, Peripleurites boeckhi, Peripleurites roemeri, Rhabdoceras suessi		
Mesozoic	Middle Triassic	Payandé Fm.	Payandé	Tolima	Cidaris cf. hausmanni, C. cf. scrobiculata, Costatoria jaworskii, Gruenewaldia multicostata, Isocrinus aff. trechmanni, Metasibirites annulosus, M. tolimensis n. sp., Monotis subcircularis, Myophorigonia ex gr. paucicostata, Rhabdoceras ex gr. suessi, Spiriferina abichi, Zygopleura cf. modestum, Z. cf. sturi, Z. cf. subanthophylloides, Coenothyris sp., ?Discophyllites sp., Gervillella sp., Homomya sp., Leptochondria sp., ?Limatula sp., Loxonema sp., Megalodon sp., ?Myophoria sp., ?Oxynautilus sp.,?Pleuromya sp., ?Pomarangina sp., Schafhaeutlia sp., ?Wittenburgella sp., Brachiopoda indet., Crinoidea indet.		
Paleozoic	Middle Permian	Palmarito Fm.	Río Molino	Magdalena	Mooreoceras sp.		
Paleozoic	Middle Permian		Quebrada Manaure	La Guajira	Perrinites hilli, Eumedlicottia sp., ?Stearoceras sp.		
Paleozoic	Early Permian						
Paleozoic	Mid Carboniferous						
Paleozoic	Early Carboniferous	Cuche Fm.	Floresta	Boyacá	Antarctilamna sp., Asterolepis sp., Bothriolepis sp., Holoptychius sp., ?Strepsodus sp., ?Ginkgo lamariensis, Baiera sp., Welleria sp., Lingula sp.		
Paleozoic	Frasnian	Cuche Fm.	Floresta	Boyacá	Antarctilamna sp., Asterolepis sp., Bothriolepis sp., Holoptychius sp., ?Strepsodus sp., ?Ginkgo lamariensis, Baiera sp., Welleria sp., Lingula sp.		
Paleozoic	Early Givetian	Floresta Fm.	Floresta	Boyacá	Platyceras aff. nodosum		
Paleozoic	Early Givetian	Floresta Fm.	Floresta	Boyacá	Placoderm fishes, Colombianaspis carvalhoae gen. et sp. nov., Schizobolus pilasiensis sp. nov., Tarijactinoides sp. nov., Anchiopsis armata, Barroisella sp., Belenopyge contusa, Cordania gasepiou, Coronura cf. lessepsensis, Dechenella boteroi, Dipleura cf. dekayi, Greenops cf. grabaui, Kettneraspis callicera, Mannopyge sp., Synphoria stemmata, ?Tarutiglossa sp., Viaphacops cristata, Acrospirifer olssoni, Anoplotheca cf. silvetii, Atrypa harrisi, Australospirifer cf. antarcticus, Aviculopecten wellsi, Brachyspirifer palmerae, Camarotoechia dotis, Chonetes cf. billingsi, C. comstockii, C. cf. stubeli, Chonostrophia knodi, Cyclotrypa boyaca, C. carribeana, C. dickeyi, C. reticulata, C. stellata, Cymostrophia dickeyi, C. schucherti, C. waringi, Cypricardinia cf. subindenta, Cyrtina hamiltonensis, Dalmanites cf. patacamayaensis, Dechenella boteroi, Dictyostrophia cooperi, Elytha colombiana, Eodevonaria imperialis, Favosites aff. hamiltonensis, Fenestrellina colombiana, F. olssoni, F. acuta, F. quadrata, F. harrisi, Fistulipora anomala, F. megalopora, Florestacanthus morenoi, Greenops cf. grabaui, Heliophyllum halli, Intrapora fragilis, I. megalopora, Leiorhynchus mysia, Leptaena boyaca, Megastrophia hopkinsi, M. pygmaea, Meristella wheeleri, Nucleospira concinna, Meganteris australis, Odontopleura callicera, Pentagonia gemmisulcata, Phacops cf. salteri, Pholidops florestae, Platyostoma lineata, Pleurodictyum americanum, Polypora elegantula, P. granulifera, Prismopora inornata, Schellwienella goldringae, Semicoscinium colombiensis, S. minutum, Spinocyrtia cf. valenteana, Spinulicosta spinulicosta, Spirifer kingi, Strophonella floweri, S. meridionalis, Sulcoretepora olssoni, S. subramosa, Taeniopora florestae, Tropidoleptus carinatus, Unitrypa casteri, Viaphacops cristata, Acanthograptus sp., Actinopteria sp, Amphigenia sp., Anthozoa sp., Aviculopecten sp., Camarotoechia sp., Cryptonella sp., Cyphaspis sp., Cryphaeus sp., Dalmanites sp., Derbyina sp., Gastropoda sp., Grammysia sp., Homalonotus sp., Leptostrophia sp., Mediospirifer sp., Orthoceras sp., Ostracoda sp., Orthis sp., Paraspirifer sp., Proetus sp., Pterinea sp., Strophodonta sp., Thamnopora sp., Vitulina sp.		
Paleozoic	Late Emsian	Floresta Fm.	Floresta	Boyacá			
Paleozoic	Devonian	Río Cachirí Gp.	Cesar-Ranchería Basin	Cesar; La Guajira	Acrospirifer olssoni; Spirifer kingi, Leptaena boyaca, Fenestella venezuelansis, Neospirifer latus, Composita subtilita, Phricodrotis planoconvexa, Pecten sp.		
Paleozoic	Early Devonian						
Paleozoic	Silurian						
Paleozoic	Late Ordovician						
Paleozoic	Middle Ordovician		Caño Cristales	Meta	Dichograptus sp., Tetragraptus sp., ?Lingulella sp., ?Obolus sp.		
Paleozoic	Darriwilian	El Higado Fm. Venado Fm.	Tarqui	Huila	Acodus deltatus, Anebolithus tafuri, Costiconus iniquus, ?Costiconus cf. ethingtoni, Cryptograptus tricornis, Didymograptus artus, Didymograptus murchisoni, Drepanodus robustus, Drepanoistodus cf. tablepointensis, Hallograptus bimucronatus, Ogygiocarella cf. debuchii, Ogygiocaris cf. macrops, ?Paltodus deltifer, Parapaltodus simplicissimus, Paroistodus numarcuatus, Protolloydolithus cf. salax, Protopanderodus rectus, Semiacontiodus cf. cornuformis, Scolapodus striatus, Cerninella sp., Cordylodus sp., Glyptograptus sp., ?Obolus sp., Porterfieldia sp., Schizocrania sp., Asaphidae sp.		
Paleozoic	Floian	El Higado Fm. Venado Fm.	Tarqui	Huila			
Paleozoic	Early Ordovician	?Guapayito Fm.	Guaviare River; Serranía de la Macarena	Meta	Acrotreta sp., ?Apheoorthis sp., Basiliella sp., Geragnostus sp., Kainella sp., ?Leptoplastides sp., Lingulella sp., Megistaspis sp., ?Nanorthis sp., ?Niobella sp., ?Pseudokainella sp., Raphiophorus sp., Symphysurus sp., ?Tropidodiscus sp., Tropidopyge sp., ?Westergaardia sp.		
Paleozoic	Cambrian	Duda Fm.	El Dorado	Meta	Paradoxides sp.		
Proterozoic							

== Proposed reclassification of South American gomphotheres ==
Some authors, Lucas, Mothé, Avilla et al., propose a reclassification of the South American gomphotheres as follows:

- Stegomastodon (Pohlig 1912) is an exclusively North American genus
- Haplomastodon (Hoffstetter 1950) is a South American genus, but synonymous with Notiomastodon (Cabrera 1929)
- as Notiomastodon was defined earlier, all Haplomastodon species should be considered part of Notiomastodon
- all formerly described species as Stegomastodon sp., Haplomastodon sp. and Notiomastodon sp. belong to a single species; Notiomastodon platensis
- Cuvieronius (Osborn 1923) is the only remaining South American genus outside of Notiomastodon

=== Evolution ===
- Lucas (2010, 2013) proposes that Notiomastodon evolved from Cuvieronius inside South America
- Mothé et al. (2012, 2015, 2016) propose that Notiomastodon and Cuvieronius reached South America in two separate migration waves

== See also ==
- List of fossiliferous stratigraphic units in Venezuela
- List of mining areas in Colombia
- South American land mammal age
- Gomphothere fossils in Colombia
- Geology of Colombia
  - Geology of the Ocetá Páramo
  - Geology of the Altiplano Cundiboyacense
  - Geology of the Eastern Hills of Bogotá

== Notes and references ==
=== References ===
==== Bibliography ====
===== Pleistocene-Holocene =====
- Bürgl, Hans (1956), Restos de Megatherium y otros fósiles de Quipile, Cundinamarca, INGEOMINAS, pp. 1–14
- Correal Urrego, Gonzalo (1990), "Evidencias culturales durante el Pleistocene y Holoceno de Colombia - Cultural evidences during the Pleistocene and Holocene of Colombia" (PDF), Revista de Arqueología Americana (in Spanish), 1: 69–89
- Van der Hammen, Thomas (1986), "Cambios medioambientales y la extinción del mastodonte en el norte de los Andes", Revista de Antropología, Universidad de los Andes, II: 27–34
- Hernández Camacho, Jorge; De Porta, Jaime (1960), "Un nuevo Bóvido pleistocénico de Colombia: Colombibos atactodontus", Boletín de Geología, Universidad Nacional de Colombia, 5: 41–52
- Páramo Fonseca, María Euridice; Escobar Quemba, Ingrid Carolina (2010), "Restos mandibulares de mastodonte encontrados en cercanías de Cartagena, Colombia" (PDF), Geología Colombiana, 35: 50–57
- Pardo Jaramillo, Mauricio (2012), "Reporte del hallazgo de un cráneo de Stegostadon (sic) waringi (Holland, 1920) juvenil (Mammalia, Proboscidea) en la zona rural del municipio de Turbaná, Bolívar, Colombia", Revista de la Academia Colombiana de Ciencias Exactas, Físicas y Naturales, 36: 203–210
- De Porta, Jaime (1961), "La posición estratigráfica de la fauna de Mamíferos del pleistoceno de la Sabana de Bogotá", Boletín de Geología, Universidad Industrial de Santander, 7: 37–54
- De Porta, Jaime (1960), "Los Equidos fósiles de la Sabana de Bogotá", Boletín de Geología, Universidad Industrial de Santander, 4: 51–78
- Rodríguez Flórez, Carlos David; Rodríguez Flórez, Ernesto León; Rodríguez, Carlos Armando (2009), "Revision of Pleistocenic Gomphotheriidae Fauna in Colombia and case report in the Department of Valle Del Cauca" (PDF), Scientific Bulletin, 13, Museum Center - Natural History Museum: 78–85
- Villarroel A., Carlos S.; Clavijo, Jairo (2005), "Los Mamíferos fósiles y las edades de las sedimentitas continentales del Neógeno de la costa Caribe colombiana", Revista de la Academia Colombiana de Ciencias Exactas, Físicas y Naturales, XXIX: 345–356
- Villarroel, Carlos; Concha, Ana Elena; Macía, Carlos (2001), "El Lago Pleistoceno de Soatá (Boyacá, Colombia): Consideraciones estratigráficas, paleontológicas y paleoecológicas", Geología Colombiana, 26, Universidad Nacional de Colombia: 79–93
- Villarroel A., Carlos S.; Brieva B., Jorge; Cadena, Alberto (1996), "La Fauna de Mamíferos Fósiles del Pleistoceno de Jutua, Municipio de Soatá (Boyacá, Colombia)" (PDF), Geología Colombiana, 21: 81–87

===== Cocinetas Basin =====
- Amson, Eli; Carrillo, Juan D.; Jaramillo, Carlos (2016), "Neogene sloth assemblages (Mammalia, Pilosa) of the Cocinetas Basin (La Guajira, Colombia): Implications for the Great American Biotic Interchange" (PDF), Palaeontology, 59 (4): 563–582, Bibcode:2016Palgy..59..563A, doi:10.1111/pala.12244
- Cadena, Edwin; Jaramillo, Carlos (2015), "Early to middle Miocene turtles from the northernmost tip of South America: giant testudinids, chelids, and podocnemidids from the Castilletes Formation, Colombia" (PDF), Ameghiniana, 52 (2): 188–203, Bibcode:2015Amegh..52..188C, doi:10.5710/AMGH.10.11.2014.2835
- Carrillo Briceño, Jorge D.; Argyriou, Thodoris; Zapata, Vladimir; Kindlimann, René; Jaramillo, Carlos (2016), "A New Early Miocene (Aquitanian) Elasmobranchii Assemblage from the la Guajira Peninsula, Colombia" (PDF), Ameghiniana, 53 (2): 77–99, Bibcode:2016Amegh..53...77C, doi:10.5710/AMGH.26.10.2015.2931
- Hendy, Austin J.W.; Jones, Douglas S.; Moreno, Federico; Zapata, Vladimir; Jaramillo, Carlos (2015), "Neogene molluscs, shallow marine paleoenvironments, and chronostratigraphy of the Guajira Peninsula, Colombia" (PDF), Swiss Journal of Palaeontology, 134 (1): 45–75, Bibcode:2015SwJP..134...45H, doi:10.1007/s13358-015-0074-1
- Moreno, F.; Hendy, A.J.W.; Quiroz, L.; Hoyos, N.; Jones, D.S.; Zapata, V.; Zapata, S.; Ballen, G.A.; Cadena, A.L. Cárdenas, J.D. Carrillo Briceño, J.D. Carrillo, D. Delgado Sierra, J. Escobar, J.I. Martínez, C. Martínez, C. Montes, J. Moreno, N. Pérez, R. Sánchez, C. Suárez, M.C. Vallejo Pareja, C. Jaramillo, Edwin (2015), "Revised stratigraphy of Neogene strata in the Cocinetas Basin, La Guajira, Colombia" (PDF), Swiss Journal of Palaeontology, 134 (1): 5–43, Bibcode:2015SwJP..134....5M, doi:10.1007/s13358-015-0071-4
- Moreno Bernal, Jorge W (2014), Fossil Crocodilians from the High Guajira Peninsula of Colombia, and the History of Neogene Crocodilian Diversity in Tropical South America, University of Nebraska–Lincoln, pp. 1–66
- Pérez, María E.; Vallejo Pareja, María C.; Carrillo, Juan D.; Jaramillo, Carlos (2017), "A New Pliocene Capybara (Rodentia, Caviidae) from Northern South America (Guajira, Colombia), and its Implications for the Great American Biotic Interchange" (PDF), Journal of Mammalian Evolution, 24: 111–125, doi:10.1007/s10914-016-9356-7

===== Honda Group =====
- Cadena, Edwin; Jaramillo, Carlos; Páramo, María E. (2008), "New material of Chelus colombiana (Testudines; Pleurodira) from the Lower Miocene of Colombia" (PDF), Journal of Vertebrate Paleontology, 28 (4): 1206–1212, Bibcode:2008JVPal..28.1206C, doi:10.1671/0272-4634-28.4.1206
- Croft, Darin A (2007), "The Middle Miocene (Laventan) Quebrada Honda Fauna, southern Bolivia and a description of its Notoungulates", Palaeontology, 50 (1): 277–303, Bibcode:2007Palgy..50..277C, doi:10.1111/j.1475-4983.2006.00610.x
- Czaplewski, Nicolas J.; Takai, Masanaru; Naeher, Tiffany M.; Shigehara, Nobuo; Setoguchi, Takeshi (2003), "Additional bats from the middle Miocene La Venta fauna of Colombia" (PDF), Revista Académica Colombiana de Ciencias Naturales, XXVII: 263–282
- Defler, Thomas (2004), Historia natural de los primates colombianos (PDF), Universidad Nacional de Colombia, pp. 1–613
- Estes, Richard; Wassersug, Richard (1963), "A Miocene toad from Colombia, South America" (PDF), Breviora, 193: 1–13, archived from the original (PDF) on 2015-03-19
- De la Fuente, Marcelo; Sterli, Juliana; Maniel, Ignacio (2013), Origin, Evolution and Biogeographic History of South American Turtles, Springer Science & Business Media, pp. 1–168, Bibcode:2014oebh.book.....D, ISBN 978-3-319-00518-8
- Hsiou, Annie S.; Albino, Adriana M.; Ferigolo, Jorge (2010), "Reappraisal of the South American Miocene snakes of the genus Colombophis, with description of a new species", Acta Palaeontologica Polonica, 55 (3): 365–379, Bibcode:2010AcPaP..55..365H, doi:10.4202/app.2009.1111
- Lundberg, John G.; Chernoff, Barry (1992). "A Miocene Fossil of the Amazonian Fish Arapaima (Teleostei, Arampaimidae) from the Magdalena River Region of Colombia - Biogeographic and Evolutionary Implications" (PDF). Biotropica (FTP). pp. 2–16. Bibcode:1992Biotr..24....2L. doi:10.2307/2388468. JSTOR 2388468. (To view documents see Help:FTP)
- Marshall, Larry G (1976), "New Didelphine Marsupials from the La Venta Fauna (Miocene) of Colombia, South America", Journal of Paleontology, 50 (3): 402–418, JSTOR 1303521
- Meldrum, D.J.; Kay, R.F. (1997), "Nuciruptor rubricae, a new pitheciin seed predator from the Miocene of Colombia" (PDF), American Journal of Physical Anthropology, 102 (3): 407–427, doi:10.1002/(SICI)1096-8644(199703)102:3<407::AID-AJPA8>3.0.CO;2-R, PMID 9098507
- Miller, Alden H (1953), "A fossil Hoatzin from the Miocene of Colombia" (PDF), Auk, 70 (4): 484–495, doi:10.2307/4081360, JSTOR 4081360
- Organ, Jason M.; Lemelin, Pierre (2011), "Tail Architecture and Function of Cebupithecia sarmientoi, a Middle Miocene Platyrrhine from La Venta, Colombia", The Anatomical Record, 294 (12): 2013–2023, doi:10.1002/ar.21504, PMID 22042718
- Pardo Jaramillo, Mauricio (2010), "Reporte de un nuevo ejemplar de Granastrapotherium snorki en el Valle Superior del Magdalena, Desierto de la Tatacoa, Huila. Colombia" (PDF), Revista Académica Colombiana de Ciencias Naturales, 34: 253–256
- Rasmussen, Tab (1997), Vertebrate paleontology in the neotropics - the Miocene fauna of La Venta, Colombia, Smithsonian Institution Press, pp. 1–608
- Rosenberger, A.L.; Setoguchi, T.; Hartwig, W.C. (1991), "Laventiana annectens, new genus and species: fossil evidence for the origins of callitrichine New World monkeys", Proceedings of the National Academy of Sciences of the United States of America, 88 (6): 2137–2140, Bibcode:1991PNAS...88.2137R, doi:10.1073/pnas.88.6.2137, PMC 51184, PMID 1900937
- Setoguchi, Takeshi; Rosenberger, Alfred L. (1988), "A fossil owl monkey from La Venta, Colombia" (PDF), Kyoto University Overseas Research Reports of New World Monkeys, 6: 1–6
- Setoguchi, T (1985), "Kondous laventicus, a new ceboid primate from the Miocene of the La Venta, Colombia, South America", Folia Primatol, 44 (2): 96–101, doi:10.1159/000156200, PMID 4043876
- Suárez, Catalina; Forasiepi, Analía M.; Goin, Franciso J.; Jaramillo, Carlos (2015), "Insights into the Neotropics prior to the Great American Biotic Interchange: new evidence of mammalian predators from the Miocene of Northern Colombia" (PDF), Journal of Vertebrate Paleontology, e1029581: 1–10
- Takai, Masanaru; Anaya, Federico; Suzuki, Hisashi; Shigehara, Nobuo; Setoguchi, Takeshi (2001), "A New Platyrrhine from the Middle Miocene of La Venta, Colombia, and the Phyletic Position of Callicebinae", Anthropological Science, Tokyo, 109 (4): 289, doi:10.1537/ase.109.289
- Takai, Masanaru; Setoguchi, Takeshi; Villarroel A., Carlos; Cadena G., Alberto; Shigehara, Nobuo (1991), "A New Miocene Molossid Bat from La Venta, Colombia, South America" (PDF), Memoirs of the Faculty of Science, Kyoto University. Series of Geology and Mineralogy, 56: 1–9
- Tejedor, Marcelo F (2013), "Sistemática, evolución y paleobiogeografía de los primates Platyrrhini" (PDF), Revista del Museo de La Plata, 20: 20–39
- Vallejo Pareja, M.C.; Carrillo, J.D.; Moreno Bernal, J.W.; Pardo Jaramillo, M.; Rodríguez González, D.F.; Muñoz Duran, J. (2015), "Hilarcotherium castanedaii, gen. et sp. nov., a new Miocene astrapothere (Mammalia, Astrapotheriidae) from the Upper Magdalena Valley, Colombia" (PDF), Zurich Open Repository and Archive, University of Zurich, 35 (2) e903960, Bibcode:2015JVPal..35E3960V, doi:10.1080/02724634.2014.903960
- Villarroel A., Carlos S (1997), "La Estructura de la Dentición Caduca de Huilatherium pluriplicatum, Leontiniidae (Notoungulata) del Mioceno de Colombia", Geología Colombiana, 22: 139–149
- Villarroel A., Carlos; Setoguchi, Takeshi; Brieva, Jorge; Macia, Carlos (1996), "Geology of the La Tatacoa "Desert" (Huila, Colombia): Precisions on the Stratigraphy of the Honda Group, the Evolution of the "Pata High" and the Presence of the La Venta Fauna" (PDF), Memoirs of the Faculty of Science, Kyoto University. Series of Geology and Mineralogy, 58: 41–66
- Wheeler, Brandon (2010), "Community ecology of the Middle Miocene primates of La Venta, Colombia: the relationship between ecological diversity, divergence time, and phylogenetic richness", Primates, 51 (2): 131–138, doi:10.1007/s10329-009-0181-y, PMID 20037832

===== Bogotá Formation =====
- Bloch, Jonathan Ivan; Cadena, Edwin; Hastings, Alexander; Rincón, Aldo F.; Jaramillo, Carlos (2008), "Vertebrate faunas from the Paleocene Bogotá Formation of northern Colombia (Abstract)", Journal of Vertebrate Paleontology, Society of Vertebrate Paleontology, 68th Annual Meeting: _
- Cadena, Edwin A (2014), "The fossil record of turtles in Colombia; a review of the discoveries, research and future challenges" (PDF), Acta Biológica Colombiana, Universidad Nacional de Colombia, 19 (3): 333–339, Bibcode:2014AcBC...19..333C, doi:10.15446/abc.v19n3.42223
- Head, Jason J.; Bloch, Jonathan Ivan; Rincón, Aldo F.; Moreno Bernal, Jorge W. (2012), "Paleogene Squamates from the Northern neotropics: Ecological Implications and Biogeographic Histories (Abstract)", Journal of Vertebrate Paleontology, 72nd Annual Meeting of the Society of vertebrate Paleontology, At Raleigh, North Carolina: _
- Head, Jason J.; Bloch, Jonathan Ivan; Rincón, Aldo F.; Bourque, Jason R.; Jaramillo, Carlos (2011), "An enigmatic derived snake from the earliest Eocene of equatorial South America (Abstract)", Journal of Vertebrate Paleontology, Society of Vertebrate Paleontology, 71st Annual Meeting, Las Vegas, NV: _
- Herrera, Fabiany; Manchester, Steven R.; Carvalho, Mónica R.; Jaramillo, Carlos; Wing, Scott L. (2014), "Paleocene wind-dispersed fruits and seeds from Colombia and their implications for early Neotropical rainforests" (PDF), Acta Paleobotanica, 54 (2): 197–229, doi:10.2478/acpa-2014-0008
- Herrera, Fabiany; Manchester, Steven R.; Hoot, Sara B.; Wefferling, Keir M.; Carvalho, Mónica R.; Jaramillo, Carlos (2011), "Phytogeographic implications of fossil endocarps of Menispermaceae from the Paleocene of Colombia", American Journal of Botany, 98 (12): 2004–2017, Bibcode:2011AmJB...98.2004H, doi:10.3732/ajb.1000461, PMID 22114219
- Montoya Arenas, Diana María; Reyes Torres, Germán Alfonso (2005), Geología de la Sabana de Bogotá, INGEOMINAS, pp. 1–104
- Morón, Sara; Fox, David L.; Feinberg, Joshua M.; Jaramillo, Carlos; Bayona, Germán; Montes, Camilo; Bloch, Jonathan Ivan (2013), "Climate change during the Early Paleogene in the Bogotá Basin (Colombia) inferred from paleosol carbon isotope stratigraphy, major oxides, and environmental magnetism (Abstract)", Palaeogeography, Palaeoclimatology, Palaeoecology, 388: 115–127, doi:10.1016/j.palaeo.2013.08.010
- Villarroel A., Carlos (1987), "Características y afinadas de Etayoa n. gen., tipo de una nueva familia de Xenungulata (Mammalia) del Paleoceno Medio (?) de Colombia" (PDF), Comunicaciones Paleontológicas del Museo de Historia Natural de Montevideo, 19: 241–254
- Woodburne, Michael O.; Goin, Francisco J.; Bond, Mariano; Carlini, Alfredo A.; Gelfo, Javier N.; López, Guillermo M.; Iglesias, A.; Zimicz, Ana N. (2014), "Paleogene Land Mammal Faunas of South America; a Response to Global Climatic Changes and Indigenous Floral Diversity" (PDF), Journal of Mammalian Evolution, 21: 1–73, doi:10.1007/s10914-012-9222-1

===== Cerrejón Formation =====
- Cadena, Edwin A.; Ksepka, Daniel T.; Jaramillo, Carlos A.; Bloch, Jonathan I. (2012a), "New pelomedusoid turtles from the late Palaeocene Cerrejón Formation of Colombia and their implications for phylogeny and body size evolution" (PDF), Journal of Systematic Palaeontology, 10 (2): 313–331, Bibcode:2012JSPal..10..313C, doi:10.1080/14772019.2011.569031
- Cadena, Edwin A.; Bloch, Jonathan I.; Jaramillo, Carlos A. (2012b), "New bothremydid turtle (Testudines, Pleurodira) from the Paleocene of northeastern Colombia", Journal of Paleontology, 86 (4): 688–698, Bibcode:2012JPal...86..688C, doi:10.1666/11-128R1.1
- Cadena, Edwin A.; Bloch, Jonathan I.; Jaramillo, Carlos A. (2010), "New Podocnemidid Turtle (Testudines: Pleurodira) from the Middle-Upper Paleocene of South America", Journal of Vertebrate Paleontology, 30 (2): 367–382, Bibcode:2010JVPal..30..367C, doi:10.1080/02724631003621946
- Hastings, Alexander K.; Bloch, Jonathan I.; Jaramillo, Carlos A. (2014), "A new blunt-snouted dyrosaurid, Anthracosuchus balrogus gen. et sp. nov. (Crocodylomorpha, Mesoeucrocodylia), from the Palaeocene of Colombia" (PDF), Historical Biology, 27 (8): 998–1020, Bibcode:2015HBio...27..998H, doi:10.1080/08912963.2014.918968
- Hastings, Alexander K.; Bloch, Jonathan I.; Jaramillo, Carlos A. (2011), "A new longirostrine Dyrosaurid (Crocodylomorpha, Mesoeucrocodylia) from the Paleocene of north-eastern Colombia: Biogeographocal and behavioural implications for New-World Dyrosayridae" (PDF), Palaeontology, 54 (5): 1095–1116, Bibcode:2011Palgy..54.1095H, doi:10.1111/j.1475-4983.2011.01092.x
- Head, J.J.; Bloch, J.I.; Hastings, A.K.; Bourque, J.R.; Cadena, E.A.; Herrera, F.A.; Polly, P.D.; Jaramillo, C.A. (2009), "Giant boid snake from the paleocene neotropics reveals hotter past equatorial temperatures", Nature, 457 (7230): 715–718, Bibcode:2009Natur.457..715H, doi:10.1038/nature07671, PMID 19194448
- Herrera, Fabiany A.; Jaramillo, Carlos A.; Dilcher, David L.; Wing, Scott L.; Gómez N, Carolina (2008), "Fossil Araceae from a Paleocene neotropical rainforest in Colombia", American Journal of Botany, 95 (12): 1569–1583, Bibcode:2008AmJB...95.1569H, doi:10.3732/ajb.0800172, PMID 21628164
- Wing, Scott L.; Herrera, Fabiany; Jaramillo, Carlos A.; Gómez Navarro, Carolina; Wilf, Peter; Labandeira, Conrad C. (2009), "Late Paleocene fossils from the Cerrejón Formation, Columbia ((sic)), are the earliest record of Neotropical rainforest", Proceedings of the National Academy of Sciences, 106 (44): 18627–18632, Bibcode:2009PNAS..10618627W, doi:10.1073/pnas.0905130106, PMC 2762419, PMID 19833876

===== La Frontera Formation =====
- Acosta Garay, Jorge; Ulloa Melo, Carlos E (2001), Geología de la Plancha 208 Villeta - 1:100,000 (PDF), INGEOMINAS, pp. 1–84
- Blanco, Johana Paola; Medina, Paula Andrea; Patarroyo, Pedro (2004), "La Formación La Frontera, Sección Vereda Tóriba: Una propuesta para la designación del Lectoestratotipo" (PDF), Geología Colombiana, 29: 23–40
- Páramo Fonseca, María Euridice (2000), "Yaguarasaurus columbianus (Reptilia, Mosasauridae), a primitive mosasaur from the Turonian (Upper Cretaceous) of Colombia", Historical Biology, 14 (1–2): 121–131, Bibcode:2000HBio...14..121P, doi:10.1080/10292380009380560
- Patarroyo, Pedro (2016), "Amonoideos y otros macrofósiles del lectoestratotipo de la Formación la Frontera, Turoniano inferior - medio (Cretácico Superior) en San Francisco, Cundinamarca (Colombia)" (PDF), Boletín de Geología, Universidad Industrial de Santander, 38 (2): 41–54, doi:10.18273/revbol.v38n3-2016003

===== Paja Formation =====
- Bermúdez, Hermann D.; Gómez Cruz, Arley de J.; Hyžný, Matúš; Moreno Bedmar, Josep A.; Barragán, Ricardo; Moreno Sánchez, Mario; Vega, Francisco J. (2013), "Decapod crustaceans from the Cretaceous (Aptian-Albian) San Gil Group in the Villa de Leyva section, central Colombia", Neues Jahrbuch für Geologie und Paläontologie - Abhandlungen, 267 (3): 255–272, Bibcode:2013NJGPA.267..255B, doi:10.1127/0077-7749/2013/0308
- Cadena, Edwin A.; Parham, James F. (2015a), "Oldest known marine turtle? A new protostegid from the Lower Cretaceous of Colombia", PaleoBios, 32: 1–42, doi:10.5070/P9321028615
- Cadena, Edwin (2015b), "The first South American sandownid turtle from the Lower Cretaceous of Colombia", PeerJ, 3 e1431, Bibcode:2015PeerJ...3e1431C, doi:10.7717/peerj.1431, PMC 4690369, PMID 26713227
- Carballido, José L.; Pol, Diego; Parra Ruge, Mary L.; Padilla Bernal, Santiago; Páramo Fonseca, María E.; Etayo Serna, Fernando (2015), "A new Early Cretaceous brachiosaurid (Dinosauria, Neosauropoda) from northwestern Gondwana (Villa de Leiva, Colombia)", Journal of Vertebrate Paleontology, 35 (5) e980505, Bibcode:2015JVPal..35E0505C, doi:10.1080/02724634.2015.980505
- Chaparro Vargas, León F.; León Sánchez, Oscar M.; Gómez Cruz, Arley de J. (2015), Ocurrencia de Teredolites clavatus (Leymerie, 1842) en la Formación Paja (Aptiano) de Colombia, Colonia del Sacramento, Uruguay, III Simposio Latinoamericano de Icnología, pp. 1–2
- Hampe, Oliver (2005), "Considerations on a Brachauchenius skeleton (Pliosauroidea) from the lower Paja Formation (late Barremian) of Villa de Leyva area (Colombia)" (PDF), Mitteilungen aus dem Museum für Naturkunde in Berlin, Geowissenschaftliche Reihe, 8 (1): 37–51, Bibcode:2005FossR...8...37H, doi:10.5194/fr-8-37-2005
- Kakabadze, Mikhail V.; Hoedemaeker, Philip J. (1997), "New and less known Barremian-Albian ammonites from Colombia", Scripta Geologica, 114: 57–117
- Karasawa, Hiroaki; Schweitzer, Carrie E.; Feldmann, Rodney M.; Luque, Javier (2014), "Phylogeny and Classification of Raninoida (Decapoda: Brachyura)", Journal of Crustacean Biology, 34 (2): 216–272, Bibcode:2014JCBio..34..216F, doi:10.1163/1937240X-00002216
- Luque, Javier (2015), "The oldest higher true crabs (Crustacea: Decapoda: Brachyura): insights from the Early Cretaceous of the Americas", Palaeontology, 58 (2): 251–263, Bibcode:2015Palgy..58..251L, doi:10.1111/pala.12135
- Luque, Javier (2014), "A new genus and species of raninoidian crab (Decapoda, Brachyura) from the Lower Cretaceous of Colombia, South America", Scripta Geologica, 147: 27–34
- Luque, Javier; Feldmann, Rodney M.; Schweitzer, Carrie E.; Jaramillo, Carlos; Cameron, Christopher B. (2012), "The oldest frog crabs (Decapoda: Brachyura: Raninoida) from the Aptian of northern South America", Journal of Crustacean Biology, 32 (3): 405–420, doi:10.1163/193724012X626539
- Maxwell, Erin E.; Dick, Daniel; Padilla, Santiago; Parra, Mary Luz (2015), "A new ophthalmosaurid ichthyosaur from the Early Cretaceous of Colombia", Papers in Palaeontology, 2: 59–70, doi:10.1002/spp2.1030
- Moreno Sánchez, M.; Gómez Cruz, A. de J.; Castillo González, H. (2007), "Frenelopsis y Pseudofrenelopsis (Coniferales: Cheirolepidiaceae) en el Cretácico temprano de Colombia", Boletín de Geología, 29: 13–19
- Páramo, María E.; Gómez Pérez, Marcela; Noé, Leslie F.; Etayo, Fernando (2016), "Stenorhynchosaurus munozi, gen. et sp. nov. a new pliosaurid from the Upper Barremian (Lower Cretaceous) of Villa de Leiva, Colombia, South America", Revista de la Academia Colombiana de Ciencias Exactas, Físicas y Naturales, 40 (154): 84–103, doi:10.18257/raccefyn.239
- Patarroyo, Pedro (2009), "Amonitas de un nivel de alta energía del Barremiano inferior en la Formación Paja de los sectores de Villa de Leyva (Boyacá) y Vélez (Santander)" (PDF), Boletín de Geología, 31: 15–21

===== Murca Formation =====
- Dorado Galindo, Jorge (1990), "Contribución al Conocimiento de la Estratigrafía de la Formación Brechas de Buenavista (Límite Jurásico-Cretácico). Región Noroeste de Villavicencio (Meta)" (PDF), Geología Colombiana, 17: 7–38
- Moreno M., Juan Manuel (1990), "Stratigraphy of the Lower Cretaceous Rosablanca and Cumbre Formations, Útica Sandstone and Murca Formation, West Flank, Eastern Cordillera, Colombia", Geología Colombiana, 17: 65–86
- Piraquive, Alejandro; Díaz, Juan Sebastián; Cuéllar, Tomas; Pardo, Germán; Kammer, Andreas (2011), "Reactivación Neógena de estructuras de rift del Cretácico Temprano asociadas con la Falla de Chámeza, Pajarito, Boyacá (Colombia): evidencias tectónicas y bioestratigráficas - Neogene reactivation of Early Cretaceous rift structures associated with the Chámeza Fault, Pajarito, Boyacá (Colombia): tectonic and biostratigraphic evidences" (PDF), Geología Colombiana, 36: 197–216

===== Jurassic =====
- Mojica, Jairo; Kammer, Andreas (1995), "Eventos Jurásicos en Colombia" (PDF), Geología Colombiana, 19: 165–172
- Mojica, Jairo (1984), "An outline on the Jurassic in Colombia" (PDF), Geología Colombiana, 13: 129–136

===== Cuche & Floresta Formations =====
- Giroud López, Marie Joëlle (2014), El Mar en la Localidad Tipo del Devónico Medio, del Municipio de Floresta - Boyacá, Colombia, Universidad de La Habana, pp. 1–174
- Janvier, Philippe; Villarroel A, Carlos (1998), "Los Peces Devónicos del Macizo de Floresta (Boyacá, Colombia). Consideraciones taxonómicas, bioestratigráficas, biogeográficas y ambientales", Geología Colombiana, 23: 3–18
- Mojica, Jairo; Villarroel A, Carlos (1984), "Contribución al conocimiento de las unidades paleozoicas del área de Floresta (Cordillera Oriental Colombiana; Departamento de Boyacá) y en especial al de la Formación Cuche" (PDF), Geología Colombiana, 13: 55–80
- Morzadec, Pierre; Mergl, Michal; Villarroel, Carlos; Janvier, Philippe; Racheboeuf, Patrick R. (2015), "Trilobites and inarticulate brachiopods from the Devonian Floresta Formation of Colombia: a review" (PDF), Bulletin of Geosciences, 90: 331–358, doi:10.3140/bull.geosci.1515

===== Cambro-Ordovician =====
- Borrero, C.; Sarmiento, G.N.; Gómez González, C.; Gutiérrez Marco, J.C. (2007), "Los Conodontos de la Formación El Hígado y su contribución al conocimiento del metamorfismo y la paleogeografía del Ordovícico en la Cordillera Central Colombiana", Boletín de Geología, Universidad Industrial de Santander, 29: 39–46
- Moreno Sánchez, Mario; Jesus Gómez Cruz, Arley de; Castillo González, Hardany (2008), "Graptolitos del Ordovícico y geología de los afloramientos del Río Venado (norte del Departamento del Huila)" (PDF), Boletín de Geología, 30: 9–19
- Toro Toro, Luz Mary; Moreno Sánchez, Mario; Gómez Cruz, Arley (2014), "Metagabro del Ariarí, plutonismo MORB, Cordillera Oriental de Colombia" (PDF), Boletín de Geología, 36: _
- Villarroel A., C.; Macia S., C.; Brieva B, J. (1997), "Formación Venado, nueva unidad litoestratigráfica del Ordovícico colombiano", Geología Colombiana, 22: 41–49

===== Other formations =====
- Acosta, Jorge E.; Ulloa, Carlos E. (2002), Mapa geológico del Departamento de Cundinamarca 1:250,000 - Memoria Explicativa, INGEOMINAS, pp. 1–108
- Acosta, C.E (1960), "Estratigrafía de García Rovira", Boletín de Geología, Universidad Nacional de Colombia, 5: 33–40
- Amson, Eli; Carrillo, Juan D.; Jaramillo, Carlos (2016), "Neogene sloth assemblages (Mammalia, Pilosa) of the Cocinetas Basin (La Guajira, Colombia): Implications for the Great American Biotic Interchange" (PDF), Palaeontology, 59 (4): 563–582, Bibcode:2016Palgy..59..563A, doi:10.1111/pala.12244
- Badouin, Cyril; Delanoy, Gérard; Moreno Bedmar, Josep Antón; Pictet, Antoine; Vermeulen, Jean; Conte, Gabriel; Gonnet, Roland; Boselli, Patrick; Bonelli, Marc (2016), "Revision of the Early Cretaceous genera Heminautilus SPATH, 1927, and Josanautilus MARTÍNEZ & GRAUGES, 2006 (Nautilida, Cenoceratidae)" (PDF), Carnets Geologicás, 16 (5): 61–212, doi:10.4267/2042/58977
- Billet, Guillaume; Orliac, Maëva; Antoine, Pierre-Olivier; Jaramillo, Carlos (2010), "New observations and reinterpretation on the enigmatic taxon Colombitherium (?Pyrotheria, Mammalia) from Colombia" (PDF), Palaeontology, 59 (2): 319–325, Bibcode:2010Palgy..53..319B, doi:10.1111/j.1475-4983.2010.00936.x
- Espinel Arias, Valentina; Hurtado Henao, Julian Alberto (2010), Petrografía y análisis facial de las rocas calcáreas aflorantes de la sección Tunja-Villa de Leiva (Boyacá), Universidad de Caldas, pp. 1–102
- García González, Mario; Mier Umaña, Ricardo; Cruz Guevara, Luis Enrique; Vásquez, Mauricio (2009), Informe Ejecutivo - evaluación del potencial hidrocarburífero de las cuencas colombianas, Universidad Industrial de Santander, pp. 1–219
- Gómez Cruz, Arley de Jesús; Bermúdez, Hermann D.; Vega, Francisco J. (2015), "A new species of Diaulax Bell, 1863 (Brachyura: Dialucidae) in the Early Cretaceous of the Rosablanca Formation, Colombia", Boletín de la Sociedad Geológica Mexicana, 67 (1): 103–112, Bibcode:2015BoSGM..67..103G, doi:10.18268/BSGM2015v67n1a8
- Gutiérrez Palma, Diana (1971), Exogyra squamata en el Cretáceo medio de la Cordillera Oriental de Colombia, pp. 69–130
- Gúzman, Walter; Bermúdez, Hermann Darío; Gómez Cruz, Arley de Jesús; Vega, Francisco J. (2016), "Ophthalmoplax (Decapoda: Brachyura: Portunoidea) from the late Campanian, Upper Cretaceous, of Colombia", Boletín de la Sociedad Geológica Mexicana, 68 (1): 93–103, Bibcode:2016BoSGM..68...93G, doi:10.18268/BSGM2016v68n1a11
- Hoffstetter, Robert (1971), Los vertebrados cenozóicos de Colombia: yacimientos, faunas, problemas planteados (PDF), Universidad Nacional de Colombia, pp. 37–62
- Huertas G., Gustavo (1960), "De la flora fosíl de la Sabana", Boletín de Geología, Universidad Nacional de Colombia, 5: 53–57
- Luque, Javier; Hourdez, Stéphane; Vinn, Olev (2015), "A new fossil bristle worm (Annelida: Polychaeta: Aphroditiformia) from the late Cretaceous of tropical America", Journal of Paleontology, 89 (2): 257–261, Bibcode:2015JPal...89..257L, doi:10.1017/jpa.2014.22
- Monje Durán, Camila; Martínez, Camila; Escapa, Ignacio; Madriñán, Santiago (2016), "Nuevos registros de helechos y coníferas del Cretácico Inferior en la cuenca del Valle Superior del Magdalena, Colombia" (PDF), Boletín de Geología, Universidad Industrial de Santander, 38 (4): 29–42, doi:10.18273/revbol.v38n4-2016002
- Moreno Bedmar, J.A; Martínez, R.; Rodríguez, J.V.; Bermúdez, Hermann Durán (2015), Algunos ammonites del Cretácico de la Cordillera Oriental de Colombia, XV Congreso Colombiano de Geología, 2015, pp. _
- Moreno Sánchez, Mario; Gómez Cruz, Arley de Jesús; Gómez Tapias, Jorge (2012), "Reporte de huellas de dinsosaurios en el Santuario de Fauna y Flora de Iguaque, en cercanías de Chíquiza (Boyacá, Colombia)", Boletín de Geología, Universidad Industrial de Santander, 33: _
- Moreno Sánchez, Mario; Hincapié Jaramillo, Gustavo (2010), Estudio de isótopos de carbono (delta 13C) y estroncio (87Sr/86Sr) en los depósitos cretáceos-terciarios de la Cordillera Oriental (PDF), Universidad de Caldas, pp. 1–181
- Páramo Fonseca, María Euridice (2013), "Eonatator coellensis nov. sp. (Squamata: Mosasauridae), a new species from the Upper Cretaceous of Colombia" (PDF), Revista Académica Colombiana de Ciencias Naturales, XXXVII: 499–518
- Patarroyo, Pedro (2011), "Sucesión de Amonitas del Cretácico Superior (Cenomaniano-Coniaciano) de la parte más alta de la Formación Hondita y de la Formación Loma Gorda en la Quebrada Bambucá, Aipe - Huila (Colombia)" (PDF), Boletín de Geología, Universidad Nacional de Colombia, 33: 69–92
- Patarroyo, Pedro; Rojas, Alexis (2007), "La sucesión y la fauna del Turoniano de la Formación San Rafael en Pesca y su comparación con la sección tipo en Samacá (Boyacá-Colombia-S.A.)" (PDF), Geología Colombiana, Universidad Nacional de Colombia, 32: 89–96
- Pérez, María E.; Vallejo Pareja, María C.; Carrillo, Juan D.; Jaramillo, Carlos (2017), "A New Pliocene Capybara (Rodentia, Caviidae) from Northern South America (Guajira, Colombia), and its Implications for the Great American Biotic Interchange", Journal of Mammalian Evolution, 24: 111–125, doi:10.1007/s10914-016-9356-7, hdl:11336/46771
- Tchegliakova, Nadejda; Pérez, Vladimir (1995), "Registro de la Zona bioestratigrafica Dicarinella concavata (Foraminiferida) en el Extremo noroccidental de Suramerica (Colombia)", Geología Colombiana, 19: 131–143

===== South American gomphotheres =====
- Mothé, Dimila; dos Santos Avilla, Leonardo; Asevedo, Lidiane; Borges-Silva, Leon; Rosas, Mariane; Labarca-Encina, Rafael; Souberlich, Ricardo; Soibelzon, Esteban; Roman-Carrion, José Luis; Ríos, Sergio D.; Rincon, Ascanio D.; de Oliveira, Gina Cardoso; Lopes, Renato Pereira (2017). "Sixty years after 'The mastodonts of Brazil': The state of the art of South American proboscideans (Proboscidea, Gomphotheriidae)". Quaternary International. 443. Elsevier BV: 52–64. Bibcode:2017QuInt.443...52M. doi:10.1016/j.quaint.2016.08.028. hdl:11336/48585. ISSN 1040-6182.
- Mothé, Dimila; Ferretti, Marco P.; Avilla, Leonardo S. (2016b), "The Dance of Tusks: Rediscovery of Lower Incisors in the Pan-American Proboscidean Cuvieronius hyodon Revises Incisor Evolution in Elephantimorpha", PLoS ONE, 11 (1): 1–19, Bibcode:2016PLoSO..1147009M, doi:10.1371/journal.pone.0147009, PMC 4710528, PMID 26756209
- Mothé, Dimila; Avilla, Leonardo S. (2015), "Mythbusting evolutionary issues on South American Gomphotheriidae (Mammalia: Proboscidea)", Quaternary Science Reviews, 110: 23–35, Bibcode:2015QSRv..110...23M, doi:10.1016/j.quascirev.2014.12.013
- Mothé, Dimila; Avilla, Leonardo S.; Cozzuol, Mário; Winck, Gisele R. (2012), "Taxonomic revision of the Quaternary gomphotheres (Mammalia: Proboscidea: Gomphotheriidae) from the South American lowlands", Quaternary International, 276–277: 2–7, Bibcode:2012QuInt.276....2M, doi:10.1016/j.quaint.2011.05.018
- Lucas, Spencer G (2013), "The palaeobiogeography of South American gomphotheres", Journal of Palaeogeography, 2 (1): 19–40, Bibcode:2013JPalG...2...19L, doi:10.3724/SP.J.1261.2013.00015 (inactive 7 November 2026)
- Lucas, Spencer G (2008), "Taxonomic nomenclature of Cuvieronius and Haplomastodon, proboscideans from the Plio-Pleistocene of the New World", Neogene Mammals - New Mexico Museum of Natural History and Science Bulletin, 44: 409–415
