= Pseudohaploceras =

Pseudohaploceras Temporal range: Early Cretaceous 137–110 Ma

Scientific classification
- Kingdom: Animalia
- Phylum: Mollusca
- Class: Cephalopoda
- Subclass: †Ammonoidea
- Order: †Ammonitida
- Family: †Desmoceratidae
- Genus: †Pseudohaploceras; Hyatt, 1900

Species
- P. jacobi Burckhardt, 1925; P. liptoviensis Zeuschner, 1856; P. matheroni d'Orbigny, 1840; P. nipponicum Shimizu, 1931; P. portaeferreae Tietze, 1872; P. reesidei Humphrey, 1949; P. tachthaliae Tietze, 1872

Genus of molluscs (fossil)

Pseudohaploceras is a genus of desmosceratid ammonites from the Early Cretaceous; Valanginian to Albian epochs.

== Description ==
The genus is distinguished by its moderately involute, slightly to moderately compressed shell with convex sides and regular straight or sinuous constrictions between which are fairly fine, distinct, sharp or rounded branching ribs extending from the umbilical edge and crossing the venter, the outer rim.

Pseudohaploceras is considered an offshoot of early Valdedorsella, which differ in having a more broadly rounded whorl section and generally straight radial constrictions. It is included in the subfamily Pizosiinae.

== Distribution ==
Fossils of Pseudohaploceras have been found in Austria, Bulgaria, China, Colombia (Tibasosa Formation, Santa Rosa de Viterbo and Yuruma and Apón Formations, La Guajira), Egypt, Italy, Japan, Mexico, Serbia and Montenegro, Spain, Tanzania, and the former USSR.
