= Valle Alto Formation =

Geological formation of the Colombian Andes

- Stratigraphic range: Late Jurassic; ~150–145 Ma
- Type: Geological formation
- Unit of: Quebradagrande Complex

Lithology
- Primary: Shale, sandstone
- Other: Conglomerate

Location
- Coordinates: 5°22′08″N 75°22′03″W
- Region: Caldas Department; Central Ranges; Andes
- Country: Colombia

Type section
- Named for: Hacienda Valle Alto
- Named by: González et al.
- Location: San Félix
- Year defined: 1977
- Coordinates: 5°22′08″N 75°22′03″W
- Approximate paleocoordinates: 3.1°N 72.4°W
- Region: Caldas
- Country: Colombia
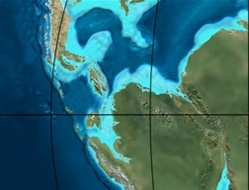
- Paleogeography of Northern South America; 150 Ma, by Ron Blakey

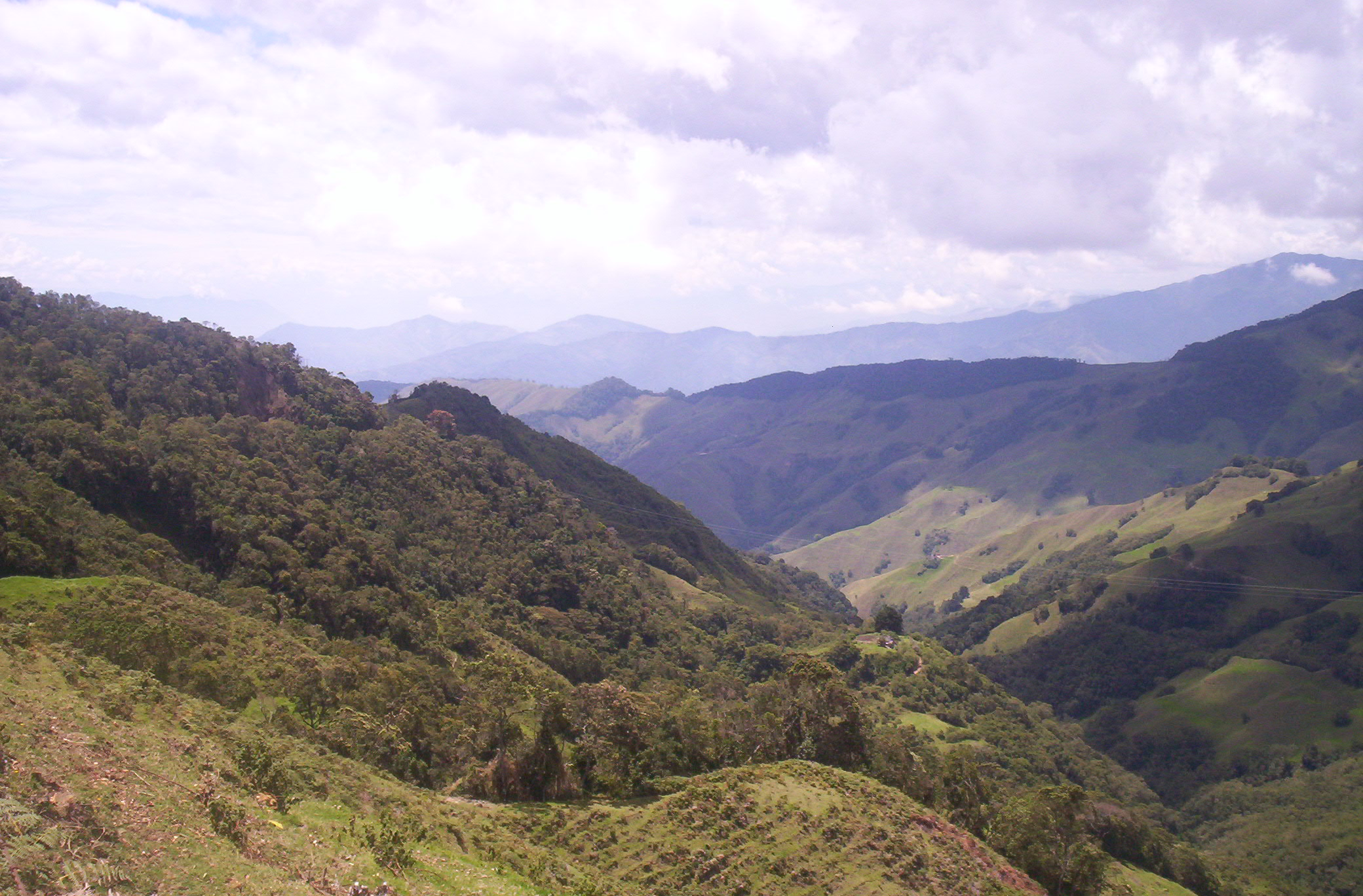
Landscape around San Félix, Caldas, where the formation is found

The Valle Alto Formation (Spanish: Formación Valle Alto, Jva) is a geological formation of the Central Ranges of the Colombian Andes. The formation is composed of shales, sandstones and conglomerates and dates to the Late Jurassic period. Ammonites and fossil flora have been found in the Valle Alto Formation.

== Etymology ==
The formation was described and named in 1977 by González et al. after Hacienda Valle Alto, San Félix, Caldas.

== Lithologies ==
The Valle Alto Formation is composed of shales, sandstones and conglomerates.

== Stratigraphy, age and depositional environment ==
The Valle Alto Formation, part of the Quebradagrande Complex, is not defined as a proper formation, rather as a collection of rocks of different facies origin segmented by tectonic forces of the Central Ranges.

The Valle Alto Formation has been deposited as the result of marine incursions from the proto-Caribbean into Colombia, preceding the larger-scale transgression of the Cretaceous.

== Fossil content ==
Fossils of Piazopteris branneri, (Note: Piazopteris branneri listed as the Permian genus Glossopteris (branneri)) Cladophlebis sp., Classopollis sp., Ctenozamites sp., Desmiophyllum sp., Gleichenites sp., Nilssoniopteris sp., Otozamites sp., Pachypteris sp., Ptilophyllum sp., Rhabdoderas sp., Sagenopteris sp., Sandlingites sp., Sphenopteris sp., Substeuroceras sp., Trigonia sp., and Zamites sp. have been found in the Valle Alto Formation.

== Outcrops ==
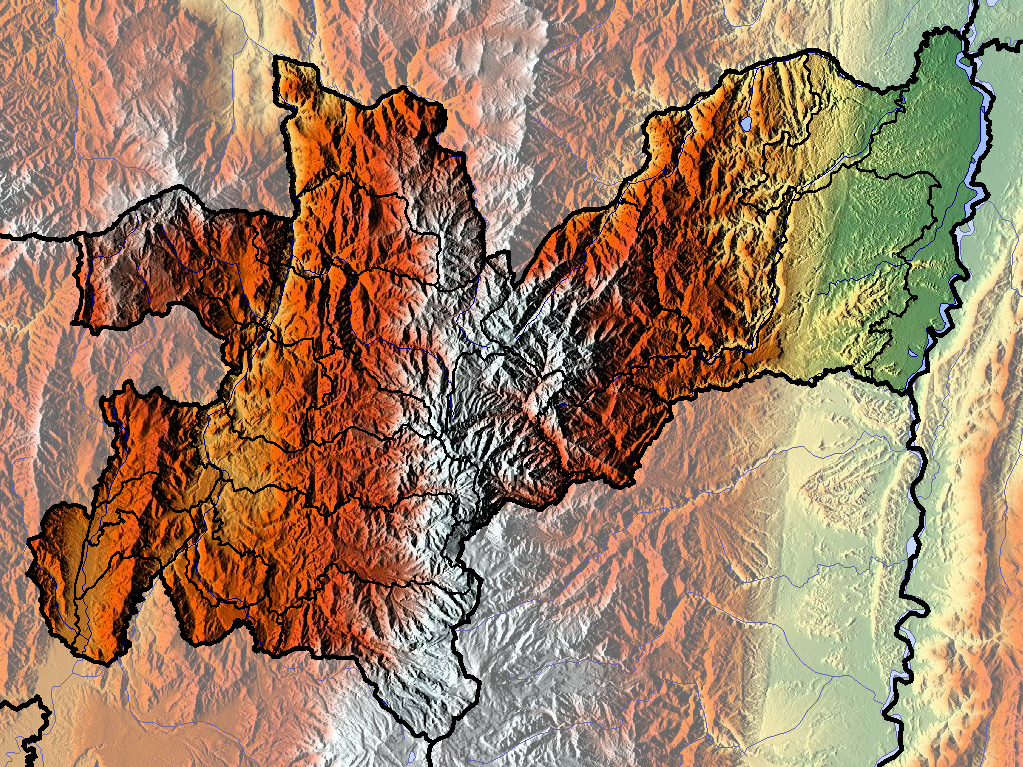
Type locality of the Valle Alto Formation in Caldas

The Valle Alto Formation is found near its type locality in the Central Ranges of the Colombian Andes, around Pácora and Salamina.

== See also ==
- Geology of the Eastern Hills
- Geology of the Ocetá Páramo
- Geology of the Altiplano Cundiboyacense
