= Heminautilus =

Heminautilus Temporal range: Aptian ~125–112 Ma

Scientific classification
- Kingdom: Animalia
- Phylum: Mollusca
- Class: Cephalopoda
- Subclass: Nautiloidea
- Order: Nautilida
- Family: †Cenoceratidae
- Genus: †Heminautilus; Spath, 1927

Species
- H. boselliorum; H. etheringtoni; H. japonicus; H. lallierianus; H. rangei; H. sanctaecrucis; H. saxbii; H. stantoni; H. tejeriensis; H. tyosiensis; H. verneuilli

Genus of molluscs

Heminautilus is an extinct genus of nautiloids from the nautilacean family Cenoceratidae that lived during the Early Cretaceous. Fossils of Heminautilus have been registered in rocks of Barremian and Aptian age. Nautiloids are a subclass of shelled cephalopods that were once diverse and numerous but are now represented by only a handful of species.

Heminautilus has a discoidal compressed involute shell with flanks converging on a narrow flattened outer margin, the venter. Whorls are higher than they are wide. The suture is sinuous with a ventral lobe, subtriangular saddles on the ventral shoulders, broad lateral lobes, and narrow rounded saddles on the umbilical shoulders. The siphuncle is subcentral.

== Species ==
The following species of Heminautilus have been described:

- H. boselliorum
- H. etheringtoni
- H. japonicus
- H. lallierianus
- H. rangei
- H. sanctaecrucis
- H. saxbii
- H. stantoni
- H. tejeriensis
- H. tyosiensis
- H. verneuilli

== Distribution ==
Fossils of Heminautilus have been found in Bulgaria, Colombia (at Caballos Formation, Boyacá, Tolima and Une Formation), Egypt, France, Hungary, Japan, Mexico, Spain, Switzerland, Tunisia, the United Kingdom, the United States (Arkansas), Venezuela.

== See also ==
- List of nautiloids
