= Palaeontology (journal) =

- Discipline: Paleontology
- Language: English
- Edited by: P D Taylor

Publication details
- History: 1957–present
- Publisher: Wiley-Blackwell (UK)
- Frequency: Bimonthly
- Open access: Hybrid/delayed, after 5 years
- Impact factor: 3.547 (2021)

Standard abbreviations
- ISO 4: Palaeontology

Indexing
- ISSN: 0031-0239 (print); 1475-4983 (web)
- OCLC no.: 44674714

Links
- Journal homepage; Online access; Online archive

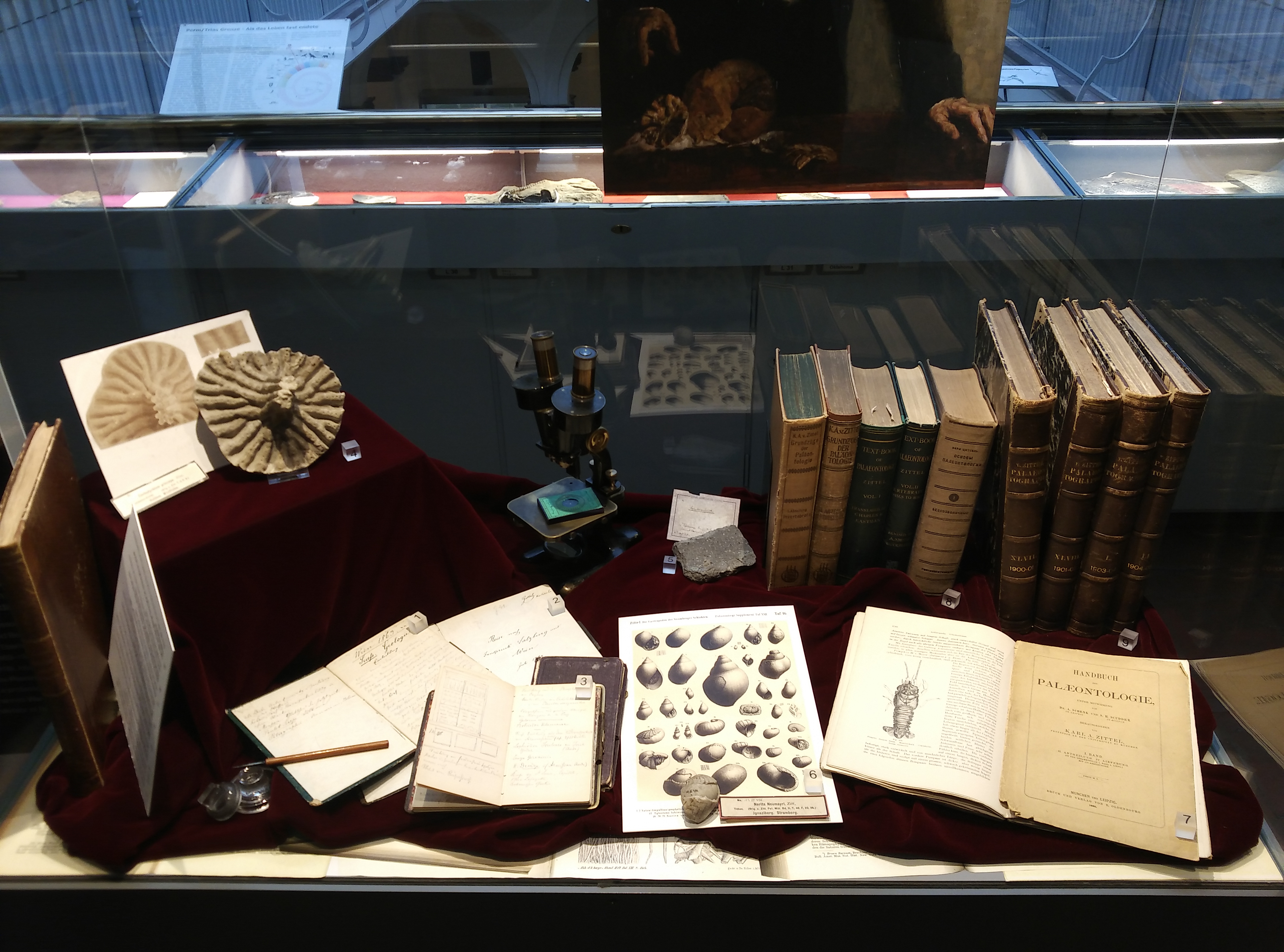
Palaeontology research display

Palaeontology is one of the two scientific journals of the Palaeontological Association (the other being Papers in Palaeontology). It was established in 1957 and is published on behalf of the Association by Wiley-Blackwell. The editor-in-chief is Dr Paul Taylor (Natural History Museum, London). Palaeontology publishes articles on a range of palaeontological topics, including taphonomy, functional morphology, systematics, palaeo-environmental reconstruction and biostratigraphy. According to the Journal Citation Reports, the journal has a 2021 impact factor of 3.547, ranking it 3rd out of 54 journals in the category "Paleontology".
