= Stephania palaeosudamericana =

Stephania palaeosudamericana Temporal range: Mid-Late Paleocene (Itaboraian) ~60–56 Ma

Scientific classification
- Kingdom: Plantae
- Clade: Tracheophytes
- Clade: Angiosperms
- Clade: Eudicots
- Order: Ranunculales
- Family: Menispermaceae
- Genus: Stephania
- Species: S. palaeosudamericana

Binomial name
- Stephania palaeosudamericana Herrera et al. 2011

Extinct species of flowering plant

Stephania palaeosudamericana is an extinct species of angiosperm from the middle to late Paleocene of South America.

== Distribution ==
Fossils of the species have been found in the Bogotá Formation of the Altiplano Cundiboyacense and the Cerrejón Formation of the Cesar-Ranchería Basin, Colombia.
