= San Luis, Tolima =

Coordinates: 4.13611°N 75.0994°W

- Municipality and town
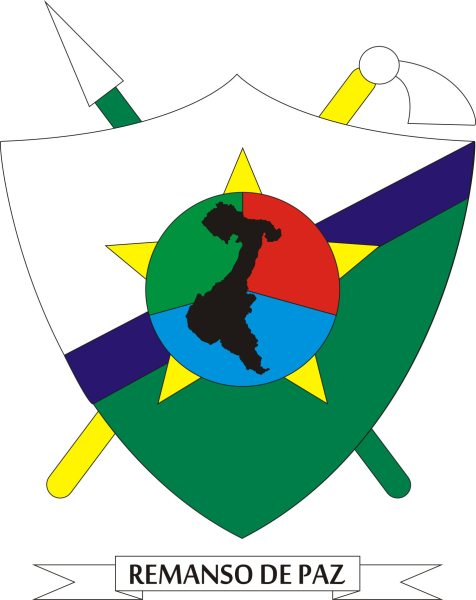
- Flag Coat of arms

- Location of the municipality and town of San Luis, Tolima in the Tolima Department of Colombia.
- Country: Colombia
- Department: Tolima Department

Government
  - mayor: Carlos Fernando Bonilla Lugo

Area
  - Total: 413.54 km^{2} (159.67 sq mi)
- Elevation: 503 m (1,650 ft)

Population (2015)
  - Total: 3,015
- Time zone: UTC-5 (Colombia Standard Time)

San Luis is a town and municipality in the Tolima department of Colombia. The population of the municipality was 19,164 as of the 1993 census.
