= Swiss Journal of Palaeontology =

- Discipline: Taxonomy, Palaeontology
- Language: English
- Edited by: Daniel Marty

Publication details
- Former name: Schweizerische Paläontologische Abhandlungen
- History: 1874–present
- Publisher: BioMed Central
- Frequency: Biannually
- Open access: Yes
- License: Creative Commons Attribution
- Impact factor: 3.0 (2023)

Standard abbreviations
- ISO 4: Swiss J. Palaeontol.

Indexing
- ISSN: 1664-2376 (print); 1664-2384 (web)
- LCCN: 2013215002
- OCLC no.: 874329910

Links
- Journal homepage; Online archive

The Swiss Journal of Palaeontology is a biannual open access peer-reviewed scientific journal covering palaeontology and taxonomy published by BioMed Central. It is affiliated with the Swiss Geological Society and a member of the Swiss Academy of Sciences.

== History ==
The journal was established as Schweizerische Paläontologische Abhandlungen in 1874 and was published by the Natural History Museum of Basel. In 2011, it was relaunched as the Swiss Journal of Palaeontology and publisher became BioMed Central. Since 2020 the journal is open access.

== Abstracting and indexing ==
The journal is abstracted and indexed in:

- BIOSIS Previews
- EBSCO databases
- Index Medicus/MEDLINE/PubMed
- Mir@bel
- ProQuest databases
- Science Citation Index Expanded
- Scopus

According to the Journal Citation Reports, the journal has a 2023 impact factor of 3.0.
