= Bulletin of Geosciences =

- Discipline: Earth sciences
- Language: English
- Edited by: J. Frýda, Š. Manda

Publication details
- History: 1926-present
- Publisher: Czech Geological Survey (Czech Republic)
- Frequency: Quarterly
- Open access: Yes
- Impact factor: 1.495 (2013)

Standard abbreviations
- ISO 4: Bull. Geosci.

Indexing
- ISSN: 1214-1119 (print); 1802-8225 (web)
- OCLC no.: 61433891

Links
- Journal homepage; Online access

The Bulletin of Geosciences is a peer-reviewed scientific journal publishing original research papers, review articles, and short contributions. It covers all aspects of palaeoenvironmental geology, including palaeontology, stratigraphy, sedimentology, palaeogeography, palaeoecology, palaeoclimatology, geochemistry, mineralogy, geophysics, and related fields. It is Diamond open access, i.e. it does not charge authors publication fees.

It is published by the Czech Geological Survey, West Bohemian Museum in Plzeň, Palacký University Olomouc and the Geological institute of Czech Academy of Sciences.

== Abstracting and indexing ==
This journal is abstracted and indexed in:

- Science Citation Index Expanded
- Current Contents/Physical, Chemical & Earth Sciences
- Scopus
- GeoRef

The journal is included in the Geoscience e-Journals collection. According to the Journal Citation Reports, the journal has a 2013 impact factor of 1.495.
