= Journal of Mammalian Evolution =

- Discipline: Life sciences
- Language: English
- Edited by: John Wible

Publication details
- History: 1993-present
- Publisher: Springer Science+Business Media
- Frequency: Bimonthly
- Impact factor: 2.357 (2014)

Standard abbreviations
- ISO 4: J. Mamm. Evol.

Indexing
- ISSN: 1064-7554 (print); 1573-7055 (web)

Links
- Journal homepage; Online access

The Journal of Mammalian Evolution is the official journal of the Society for the Study of Mammalian Evolution. The journal is peer-reviewed Bi-monthly is a multidisciplinary forum devoted to studies on the comparative morphology, molecular biology, paleobiology, genetics, developmental and reproductive biology, biogeography, systematics, ethology and ecology, and population dynamics of mammals and the ways that these diverse data can be analyzed for the reconstruction of mammalian evolution. According to the Journal Citation Reports, the journal has a 2014 impact factor of 2.357.
