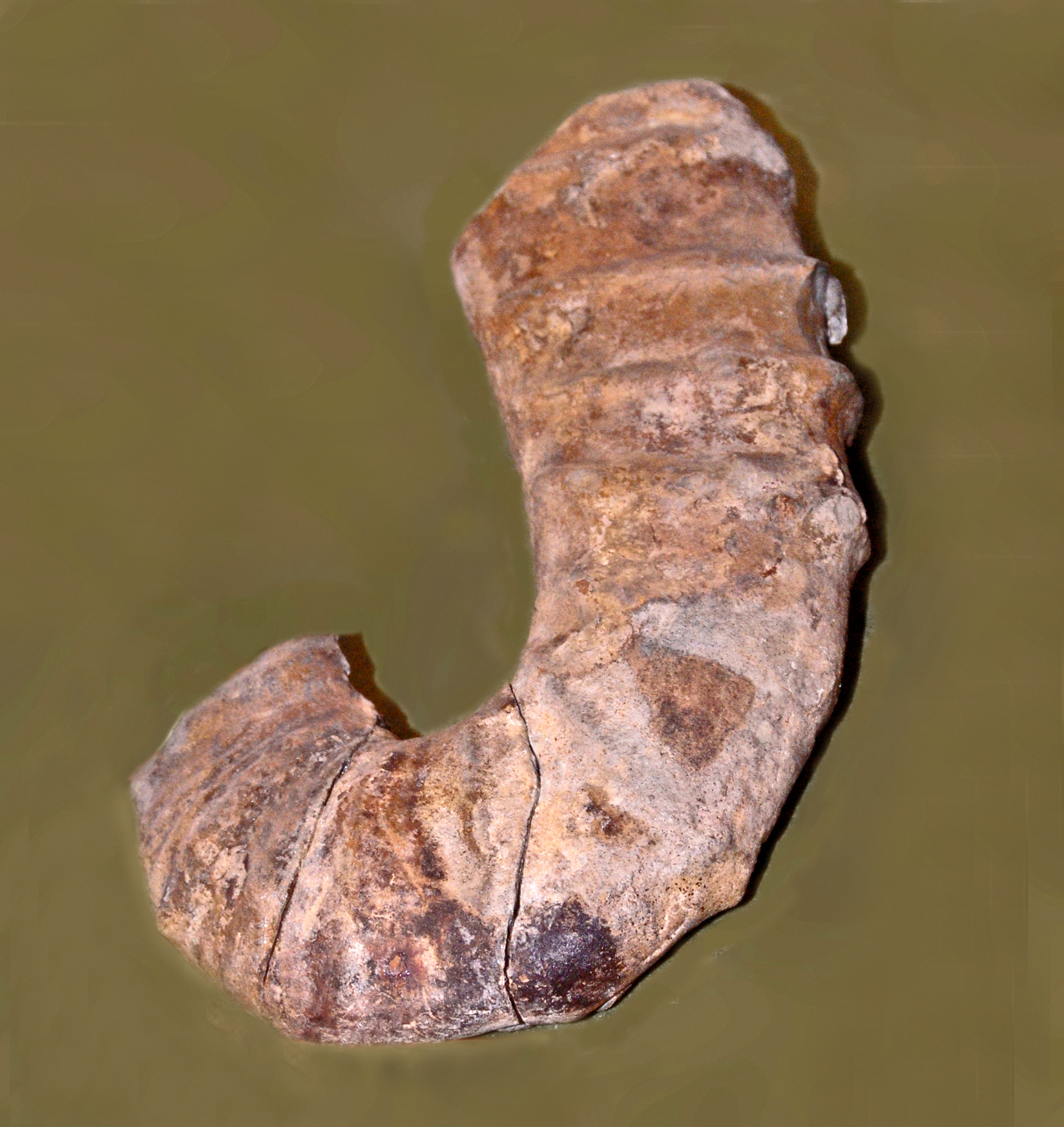
- Acanthoptychoceras spinatocostatum

Scientific classification
- Domain: Eukaryota
- Kingdom: Animalia
- Phylum: Mollusca
- Class: Cephalopoda
- Subclass: †Ammonoidea
- Order: †Ammonitida
- Suborder: †Ancyloceratina
- Family: †Ancyloceratidae
- Genus: †Acanthoptychoceras; Manolov, 1962

Species
- A. spinatocostatum

= Acanthoptychoceras =

Acanthoptychoceras Temporal range: 130.0–125.45 Ma

Extinct genus of ammonites

Acanthoptychoceras is an extinct genus of ammonites belonging to the family Ancyloceratidae.

== Species ==
- Acanthoptychoceras spinatocostatum Manolov, 1962

== Fossil record ==
Fossils of Acanthoptychoceras have been found in the Cretaceous of France, Italy, Bulgaria and Colombia (age range: from 130.0 to 125.45 million years ago.).
