= Neoptychites =

Neoptychites Temporal range: Turonian ~94.3–89.3 Ma

Scientific classification
- Kingdom: Animalia
- Phylum: Mollusca
- Class: Cephalopoda
- Subclass: †Ammonoidea
- Order: †Ammonitida
- Family: †Vascoceratidae
- Genus: †Neoptychites; Kossmat, 1895

Species
- N. (Neoptychites); N. cephalotus; N. crassus; N. telinga; N. transitorius; N. xetriformis

Genus of molluscs (fossil)

Neoptychites is an extinct ammonoid cephalopod genus from the Turonian stage of the Upper Cretaceous (around 94 to 89 Ma), with a worldwide distribution.

== Description ==
Neoptychites includes extremely involute Ammonitida whose outer whorls have a high triangular section with a moderately rounded venter (the outer rim). Tho body chamber in adults is generally smooth, with a constricted aperture. The earliest whorls are smooth except for periodic constrictions; later juvenile whorls have numerous low ribs without tubercles.

== Taxonomy ==
Neoptychites belongs to the ammonite family Vascoceratidae and is included in the subfamily Vasoceratinae. The genus was named by Kossmat in 1895. Its type species is Ammonites telinga Stoliczka, 1865 (= Ammonites cephalotus Courtiller, 1860). It is probably derived from Paravascoceras.

== Distribution ==
Fossils of Neoptychites have been found in Austria, Brazil, Cameroon, Colombia (La Frontera (Huila, Cundinamarca, Boyacá) and Loma Gorda Formations, Aipe, Huila), Egypt, France, India, Jordan, Mexico, Morocco, Niger, Nigeria, Romania, Tunisia, United States (Arizona, Colorado, New Mexico, Texas), and Venezuela.
