= Hoplitoides =

Hoplitoides Temporal range: Turonian ~94–89 Ma

Scientific classification
- Domain: Eukaryota
- Kingdom: Animalia
- Phylum: Mollusca
- Class: Cephalopoda
- Subclass: †Ammonoidea
- Order: †Ammonitida
- Family: †Coilopoceratidae
- Genus: †Hoplitoides von Koenen, 1898

Type species
- H. latesellatus

Species
- See text

Genus of algae (fossil)

Hoplitoides is an ammonite from the Upper Cretaceous, Turonian belonging to the Coilopoceratidae, a family in the Acanthoceratoidea. Hoplitoides have early whorls which are grooved, then flat, and finally narrowly rounded venters; early stages with umbilical tubercles and space ribs, later stages becoming smooth. The suture is similar to that of Coilopoceras but less extreme. Hoplitoides has an established distribution which is widespread, from western North America, northwestern Africa and northern South America.

== Species ==
- H. gibbulosus
- H. ingens
- H. koeneni
- H. latesellatus (type species)
- H. mirabilis
- H. sandovalensis
- H. wohltmanni

== Distribution ==
Fossils of Hoplitoides have been found in Brazil, Cameroon, Colombia (La Frontera, Huila, Cundinamarca and Boyacá, Loma Gorda, Aipe, Huila and San Rafael Formations), Mexico, Nigeria, Peru, Trinidad and Tobago, Tunisia, United States (New Mexico), and Venezuela.
