= Wrightoceras =

Wrightoceras Temporal range: Turonian 93–89 Ma

Scientific classification
- Kingdom: Animalia
- Phylum: Mollusca
- Class: Cephalopoda
- Subclass: †Ammonoidea
- Genus: †Wrightoceras; Reyment 1954

Species
- Wrightoceras munieri; Wrightoceras wallsi

Extinct genus of molluscs

Wrightoceras is an extinct genus of cephalopod, belonging to the ammonite subclass, that lived during the Turonian epoch of the Late Cretaceous.

== Distribution ==
Fossils of Wrightoceras have been found in Brazil, Colombia (La Frontera Formation), Egypt, Gabon, Mexico, Morocco, Nigeria, Oman, Peru, Tunisia, United States (Texas), and Venezuela.
