= Taminango =

Coordinates: 1°34′N 77°17′W

- Municipality and town
- Flag Coat of arms

- Location of the municipality and town of Taminango in the Nariño Department of Colombia.
- Country: Colombia
- Department: Nariño Department
- Founded: 1704

Area
  - Total: 284 km^{2} (110 sq mi)
- Elevation: 1,465 m (4,806 ft)

Population (2015)
  - Total: 20,537
  - Density: 72.3/km^{2} (187/sq mi)
- Time zone: UTC-5 (Colombia Standard Time)
- Website: www.taminango-narino.gov.co

Taminango is a town and municipality in the Nariño Department, Colombia. It was founded in 1704. As of 2015, Taminango had a population of 20,537.

== Climate ==
Climate data for Taminango, elevation 1,875 m (6,152 ft), (1981–2010)
Month	Jan	Feb	Mar	Apr	May	Jun	Jul	Aug	Sep	Oct	Nov	Dec	Year
Mean daily maximum °C (°F)	22.3 (72.1)	22.7 (72.9)	22.9 (73.2)	22.8 (73.0)	22.8 (73.0)	23.2 (73.8)	24.0 (75.2)	24.8 (76.6)	24.4 (75.9)	23.0 (73.4)	21.6 (70.9)	21.6 (70.9)	23.0 (73.4)
Daily mean °C (°F)	17.3 (63.1)	17.5 (63.5)	17.7 (63.9)	17.7 (63.9)	17.9 (64.2)	18.1 (64.6)	18.4 (65.1)	18.8 (65.8)	18.1 (64.6)	17.5 (63.5)	17.1 (62.8)	17.1 (62.8)	17.8 (64.0)
Mean daily minimum °C (°F)	14.3 (57.7)	14.4 (57.9)	14.6 (58.3)	14.6 (58.3)	14.7 (58.5)	14.6 (58.3)	14.4 (57.9)	14.5 (58.1)	14.1 (57.4)	14.2 (57.6)	14.3 (57.7)	14.3 (57.7)	14.4 (57.9)
Average precipitation mm (inches)	138.2 (5.44)	126.6 (4.98)	167.1 (6.58)	210.8 (8.30)	168.1 (6.62)	77.9 (3.07)	55.8 (2.20)	43.0 (1.69)	92.9 (3.66)	217.6 (8.57)	237.4 (9.35)	180.2 (7.09)	1,715.6 (67.54)
Average precipitation days	17	14	17	18	17	11	8	6	10	18	21	19	176
Average relative humidity (%)	89	88	88	89	87	82	74	70	79	87	90	90	85
Source: Instituto de Hidrologia Meteorologia y Estudios Ambientales
