= Salamina, Caldas =

Salamina (Caldas)
- Municipality and town
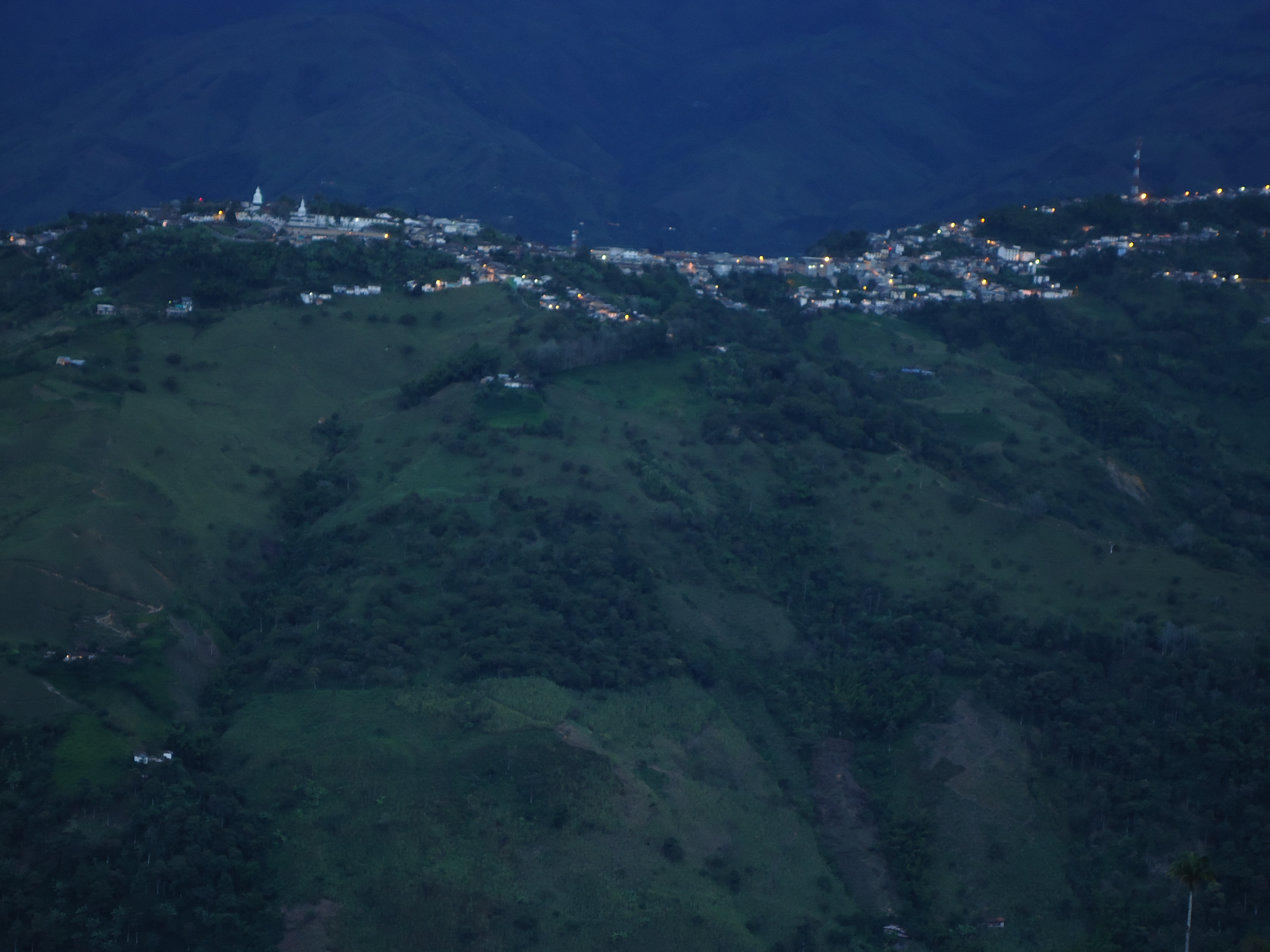

- Flag Coat of arms
- Nickname: City of Light
- Location of the municipality and town of Salamina, in the Caldas Department of Colombia.

- Location in Colombia
- Coordinates: 5°24′29.99″N 75°29′24″W
- Country: Colombia
- Department: Caldas Department
- Founded: 1825

Area
  - Municipality and town: 403.54 km^{2} (155.81 sq mi)
- Elevation: 1,822 m (5,978 ft)

Population (2009)
  - Municipality and town: 18,704
  - Density: 46.350/km^{2} (120.05/sq mi)
  - Urban: 10,933
- Time zone: UTC-5 (Colombia Standard Time)
- Website: www.salamina-caldas.gov.co

Salamina is a town and municipality in the Colombian department of Caldas. It is located north of the department and has a township called San Felix. It was declared a national monument and historic heritage of mankind.

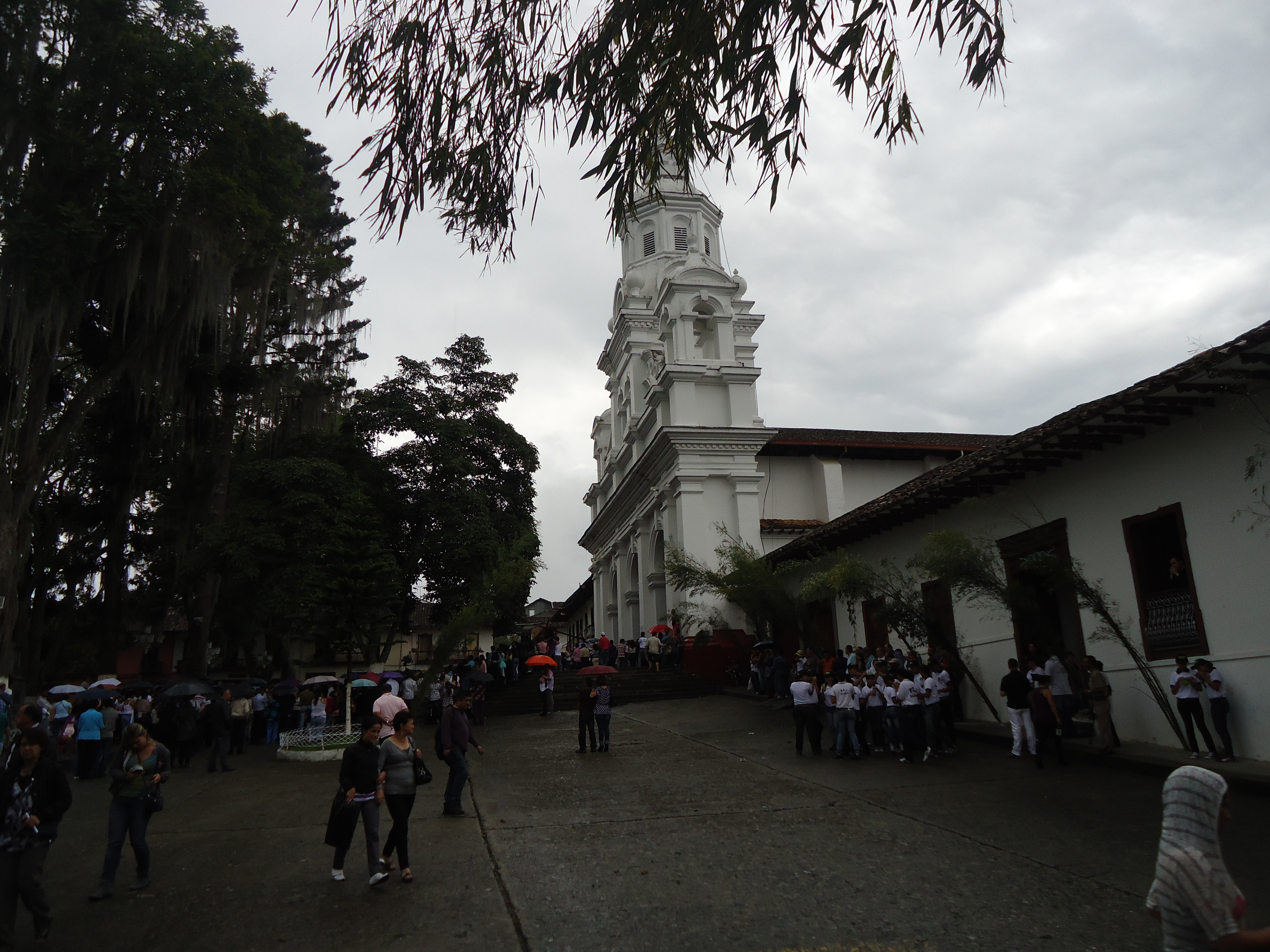
Main Park in Salamina

Salamina was founded in 1825 by Fermin Lopez, Francisco Marulanda and others. Salamina is known as the "city of light" because there Caldas has produced many poets, musicians, actors and writers. It is also known as "Mother of Nations" because it was one of the centers from where the founders and first settlers of Neira, Aranzazu, Manizales, Santa Rosa de Cabal, Pereira, Armenia, among others parted. It was elevated to a municipality in 1861.

It has a population of about 20,000 inhabitants, an area of 40,354 hectares and an average temperature of 22 °C (71.6 °F). Its economy is based on coffee, dairy and livestock.

Salamina was named a Pueblo Patrimonio (heritage town) of Colombia in 2010. It is the only municipality in the Eje Cafetero that was selected to be part of the Red Turística de Pueblos Patrimonio original cohort. In addition, the town was named part of the "Coffee Cultural Landscape" UNESCO World Heritage Site in 2011.

== Climate ==
Climate data for San Felix, Salamina, elevation 2,696 m (8,845 ft), (1981–2010)
Month	Jan	Feb	Mar	Apr	May	Jun	Jul	Aug	Sep	Oct	Nov	Dec	Year
Mean daily maximum °C (°F)	16.6 (61.9)	16.8 (62.2)	16.6 (61.9)	16.6 (61.9)	16.8 (62.2)	17.0 (62.6)	17.1 (62.8)	17.1 (62.8)	16.8 (62.2)	16.0 (60.8)	15.7 (60.3)	16.2 (61.2)	16.6 (61.9)
Daily mean °C (°F)	11.0 (51.8)	11.3 (52.3)	11.5 (52.7)	11.6 (52.9)	11.7 (53.1)	11.6 (52.9)	11.6 (52.9)	11.5 (52.7)	11.4 (52.5)	11.2 (52.2)	11.0 (51.8)	11.0 (51.8)	11.4 (52.5)
Mean daily minimum °C (°F)	5.3 (41.5)	5.9 (42.6)	6.1 (43.0)	6.7 (44.1)	6.8 (44.2)	6.3 (43.3)	6.0 (42.8)	5.9 (42.6)	6.2 (43.2)	6.4 (43.5)	6.2 (43.2)	5.6 (42.1)	6.1 (43.0)
Average precipitation mm (inches)	84.2 (3.31)	91.4 (3.60)	142.8 (5.62)	181.3 (7.14)	172.2 (6.78)	89.3 (3.52)	67.5 (2.66)	80.9 (3.19)	134.6 (5.30)	228.9 (9.01)	219.1 (8.63)	130.8 (5.15)	1,623 (63.90)
Average precipitation days	15	16	21	22	21	16	13	14	18	24	23	19	220
Average relative humidity (%)	85	85	86	87	87	85	83	82	84	86	87	87	85
Mean monthly sunshine hours	155.0	132.7	120.9	93.0	114.7	150.0	179.8	170.5	135.0	102.3	93.0	127.1	1,574
Mean daily sunshine hours	5.0	4.7	3.9	3.1	3.7	5.0	5.8	5.5	4.5	3.3	3.1	4.1	4.3
Source: Instituto de Hidrologia Meteorologia y Estudios Ambientales
