= Apón Formation =

Geological formation in the northwestern Venezuela and northern Colombia

- Stratigraphic range: Early Cretaceous (Late Aptian)
- Type: Geological formation
- Sub-units: Machiques Member
- Underlies: Aguardiente Formation
- Overlies: Río Negro Formation

Lithology
- Primary: Limestone, marl
- Other: Calcareous and sandy shales

Location
- Coordinates: 10°57′30″N 71°38′50″W
- Approximate paleocoordinates: 7.7°N 41.1°W
- Region: La Guajira, Maracaibo Basin
- Country: Colombia, Venezuela

Type section
- Named for: Apón River
- Apón Formation (Venezuela)

The Apón Formation is a geological formation in northwestern Venezuela (Maracaibo Basin) and northern Colombia (La Guajira), whose thick-bedded limestone interbedded with subordinate amounts of dark gray calcareous shale and sandy shale strata date back to the Early Cretaceous (Late Aptian epoch). Pterosaur remains of Ornithocheiridae indet. (=?Anhangueridae indet.) are among the fossils that have been recovered from the formation.

== Fossil content ==
The following fossils, among others, have been found in the Apón Formation at Toas island: Spiroculina sp., Orbitolina concava, Gryphaeostrea, Amphidonte (Ceratostreon) boussingaulti, Ostrea sp., Amphitriscoelus waringi, Requienia sp., Parahoplites sp., Cheloniceras sp., Quinqueloculina sp., Triloculina sp., and Panopea (Myopsis) plicata in Río Negro.

== See also ==
- List of pterosaur-bearing stratigraphic units
