= Cocinetas Basin =

Sedimentary basin in Colombia

- Cuenca Cocinetas
- Location of the basin in Colombia
- Coordinates: 11°58′00″N 71°22′43″W
- Etymology: Cocinetas Bay
- Region: Caribbean; Guajira-Barranquilla xeric scrub ecoregion
- Country: Colombia
- State: La Guajira
- Cities: Uribia

Characteristics
- On/Offshore: Onshore
- Boundaries: Serranía de Jarara, Serranía de Macuira, Gulf of Venezuela, Serranía Cocinas
- Part of: Circum-Caribbean basins
- Area: ~1,000 km^{2} (390 sq mi)

Hydrology
- Seas: Tortugas or Tucacas Bay, Cocinetas Bay; Gulf of Venezuela; Caribbean Sea

Geology
- Basin type: Pull-apart basin
- Plate: North Andes
- Orogeny: Andean
- Age: Mid Eocene-Holocene
- Stratigraphy: Stratigraphy
- Faults: Cuisa & Macuira (bounding)
- Field: none

The Cocinetas Basin (Spanish: Cuenca Cocinetas) is a small sedimentary basin of approximately 1,000 square kilometres (390 sq mi) in northeasternmost Colombia. The onshore pull-apart basin is located in the department of La Guajira at the border with Zulia, Venezuela. The basin is bound by three sets of hills; the Serranía de Jarara, Serranía Macuira and Serranía Cocinas, with the eastern boundary formed by the Gulf of Venezuela, part of the Caribbean Sea.

The basin was formed during the Paleogene as a result of the eastward movement of the Caribbean Plate along the northern edge of the South American Plate, leading to the deposition of a Middle Eocene to Middle Pleistocene sedimentary sequence of conglomerates, sandstones, siltstones, limestones and mudstones.

In the Cocinetas Basin, several fossiliferous stratigraphic units have been registered, providing an abundance of marine and continental vertebrate and invertebrate fossil fauna assemblages. The Uitpa, Jimol, Castilletes and Ware Formations contain numerous fossils of Neogene and Quaternary ages, both before and after the Great American Biotic Interchange (GABI), presenting new insights in the understanding of the variation in South American fauna related to the uplift of the Panama Block and the connection of North America and South America.

== Description ==
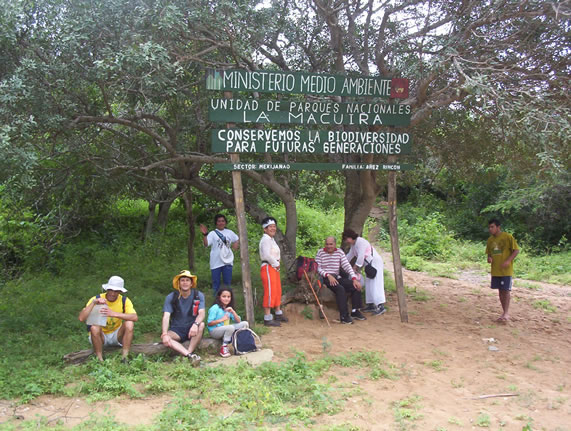
The Serranía de Macuira, with its natural park, is the northern boundary of the Cocinetas Basin. The mountain range has a unique climate in the region, hosting the only dry forests in an overall desert environment.

The Cocinetas Basin is a small onshore sedimentary basin of approximately 1,000 square kilometres (390 sq mi) in the northeasternmost part of Colombia. The northernmost onshore sedimentary basin of South America is clockwise bound by the Serranía de Jarara, the Macuira Fault separating the basin from the Serranía de Macuira, the Tucacas or Tortugas and Cocinetas Bays as part of the Gulf of Venezuela and the Serranía de Cocinas (in older literature referred to as Cosinas), separated by the Cuisa Fault.

The bounding fault to the south, the dextral Cuisa Fault with a lateral displacement of 15 kilometres (9.3 mi), has an extension of approximately 80 kilometres (50 mi) along a roughly east–west axis and the fault continues to the east underneath the Gulf of Venezuela. The fault is partly covered by Oligocene sediments. The northern boundary of the pull-apart basin is formed by the roughly northwest–southeast-trending Macuira Fault, with an extension of about 40 kilometres (25 mi). The sinistral oblique fault has a displacement of about 3 kilometres (1.9 mi) and uplifted the northeastern Serranía de Macuira.

The basin is situated in its entirety in the municipality Uribia of the department of La Guajira. The southernmost tip of the basin borders the Venezuelan state of Zulia. The villages of Uitpa, Castilletes and Puerto López are located inside the basin.

The present-day climate in the basin is very dry and hot (Köppen: BSh), being in the desert of La Guajira. The temperature in tropical northern South America does not vary much across the year. July is the hottest month with an average temperature of 30.6 °C (87.1 °F) and January has a mean of 27.9 °C (82.2 °F). Rain is sparse throughout the year, except for October, the wettest month with 109 millimetres (4.3 in) of precipitation. Alta Guajira is the driest region of Colombia and long periods of drought are common.

=== Stratigraphy ===
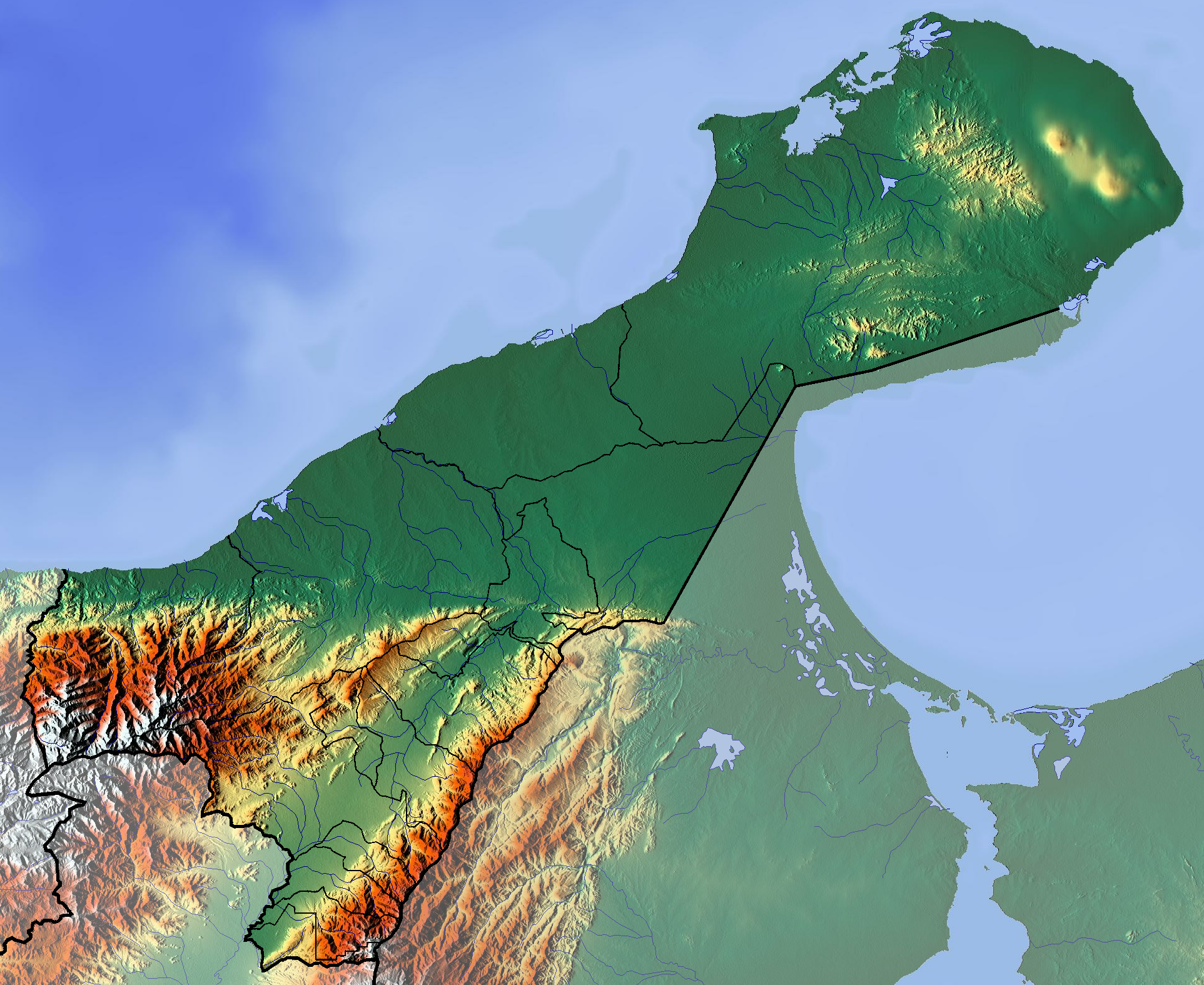
Depocentre of the Cocinetas Basin in La Guajira

The stratigraphy of the Cocinetas Basin was first defined by Renz in 1960. In 2015, Moreno et al. revised the stratigraphy of the basin in detail, redefining ages based on extensive fieldwork, biostratigraphy and ^{87}Sr/^{86}Sr isotope ratios. The basement of the basin, cropping out in the surrounding hills, is formed by the metamorphic Jarara Schist and the Paleozoic Macuira Gneiss.

Sedimentation in the basin started during the Middle to Late Eocene with the Macarao Formation and continued again during the Late Oligocene, when the Siamaná Formation, a sequence of conglomerates and thick carbonates, was deposited. Overlying the Siamaná Formation is the Early Miocene Uitpa Formation, a thick sequence of calcareous mudstone interbedded with lithic sandstones. The Uitpa Formation is covererd by the Miocene Jimol and Castilletes Formations, composed mostly of lithic sandstones and mudstones, that are in certain areas highly fossiliferous. The last phase of preserved sedimentation is represented by the Pliocene Ware Formation, defined in 2015 by Moreno et al.

The Tertiary (Paleogene to Late Pleistocene) of South America is subdivided into an own stratigraphy; the South American land mammal ages, (SALMA). This subdivision is used throughout the continent to indicate certain geologic intervals based on the occurrences of specific land mammals.

| Age | SALMA | Formation | Thickness | Lithologies | Notes |
|---|---|---|---|---|---|
| Holocene | | Alluvium | | | |
| Late Pleistocene | Lujanian | Alluvium | | | |
| Mid Pleistocene | Ensenadan | Alluvium | | | |
| Early Pleistocene | Uquian | Ware Fm. | 25 m (82 ft) | Fine lithic to quartz sandstones, mudstones, pebbly conglomerates with sedimentary and metamorphic rock fragments, fossiliferous packstones & sandy to conglomeratic beds with high fossil content | |
| Pliocene | Chapadmalalan | Ware Fm. | 25 m (82 ft) | Fine lithic to quartz sandstones, mudstones, pebbly conglomerates with sedimentary and metamorphic rock fragments, fossiliferous packstones & sandy to conglomeratic beds with high fossil content | |
| Late Miocene | Montehermosan | Ware Fm. | 25 m (82 ft) | Fine lithic to quartz sandstones, mudstones, pebbly conglomerates with sedimentary and metamorphic rock fragments, fossiliferous packstones & sandy to conglomeratic beds with high fossil content | |
| Late Miocene; Mid Miocene | Huayquerian | Hiatus | | | |
| Late Miocene; Mid Miocene | Chasicoan | Hiatus | | | |
| Late Miocene; Mid Miocene | Mayoan | Hiatus | | | |
| Late Miocene; Mid Miocene | Laventan | Hiatus | | | |
| Mid Miocene | Colloncuran | Castilletes Fm. | 440 m (1,440 ft) | Fossiliferous mudstones, siltstones & medium-grained to conglomeratic fossiliferous lithic to quartzitic sandstones | |
| Mid Miocene | Friasian | Castilletes Fm. | 440 m (1,440 ft) | Fossiliferous mudstones, siltstones & medium-grained to conglomeratic fossiliferous lithic to quartzitic sandstones | |
| Early Miocene | Santacrucian | Jimol Fm. | 203 m (666 ft) | Calcareous lithic & fossiliferous sandstones, siltstones & mudstones | |
| Early Miocene | Colhuehuapian | Uitpa Fm. | 230 m (750 ft) | Calcareous mudstones interbedded with lithic sandstones | |
| Late Oligocene | Deseadan | Siamaná Fm. | 430 m (1,410 ft) | Conglomerates & thick carbonates | |
| Mid Oligocene | Tinguirirican | Siamaná Fm. | 430 m (1,410 ft) | Conglomerates & thick carbonates | |
| Late Eocene | Divisaderan | Macarao Fm. | 253 m (830 ft) | Foraminifera-rich fine to medium grained calcareous sandstones intercalated with calcareous siltstones, cross-cut by veins of gypsum | |
| Middle Eocene | Divisaderan | Macarao Fm. | 253 m (830 ft) | Foraminifera-rich fine to medium grained calcareous sandstones intercalated with calcareous siltstones, cross-cut by veins of gypsum | |
| Early Eocene | | Hiatus | | | |
| Paleocene | | Hiatus | | | |
| Late Cretaceous | | Hiatus | | | |
| Cretaceous | | Jarara Schist | Basement | Schists & phyllites with intercalations of quartzite & localised microgabbro | |
| Jurassic | | Hiatus | | | |
| Triassic | | Hiatus | | | |
| Paleozoic | | Macuira Gneiss | Basement | Quartz-feldspathic, amphibolitic & biotitic gneisses, amphibolites, micaceous schists, migmatites, pegmatites & marbles | |

=== Depositional environments and correlations ===
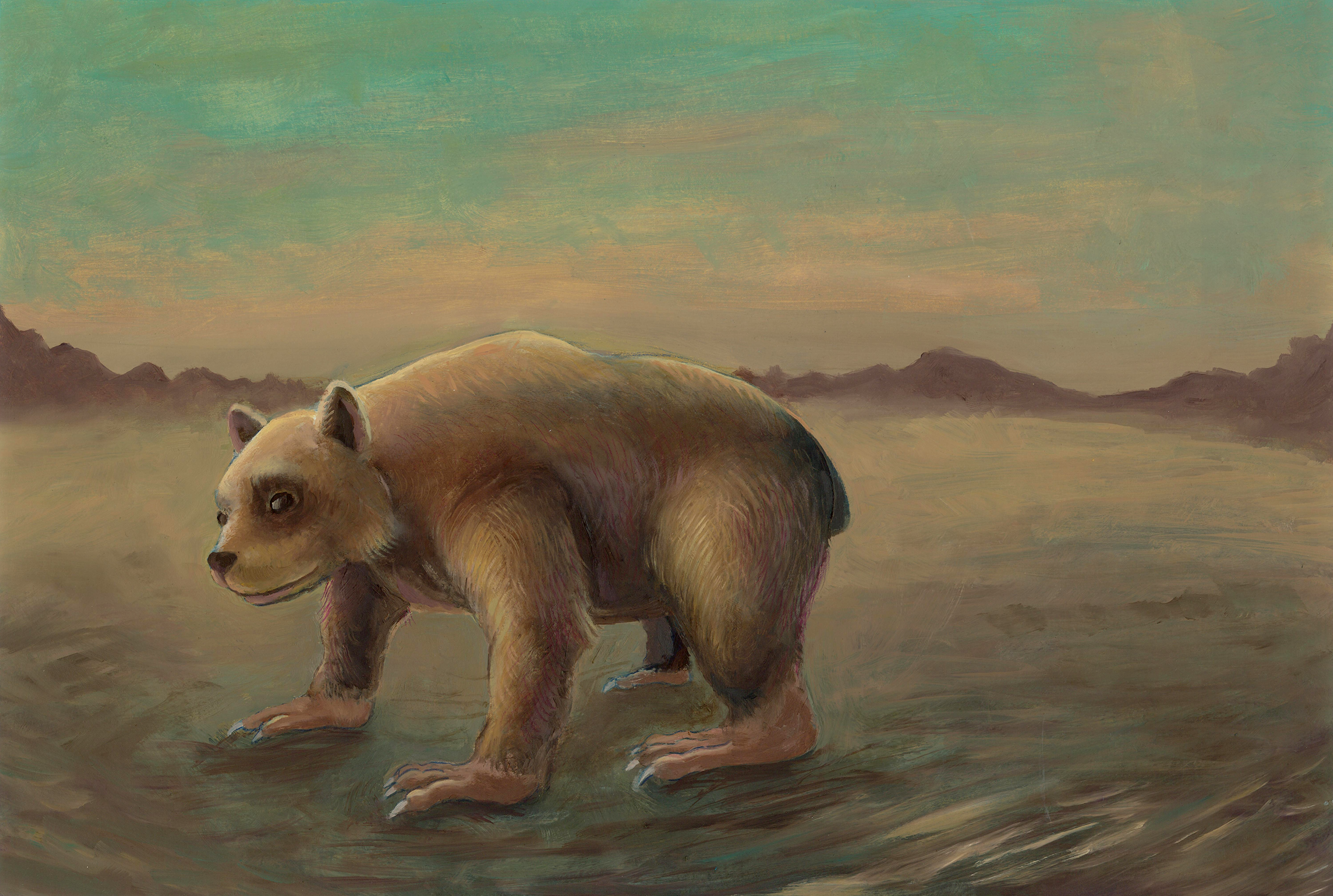
The lower part of the mostly Pliocene Ware Formation was deposited in a fluvio-deltaic coastal environment, where the carnivorous Chapalmalania foraged

The invertebrate fauna of the Jimol Formation is similar to the fauna found in the latest Early Miocene Cantaure Formation of Venezuela and the Culebra Formation of Panama. The Jimol Formation was deposited in a shallow marine environment, inner shelf depth (less than 50 metres (160 ft) water depth). This unit is correlated with the upper Agua Clara and lower Cerro Pelao Formations of the Venezuelan Falcón Basin.

The invertebrate fauna of the Castilletes Formation is highly similar not only to that of the underlying Jimol Formation, but also to the Cantaure Formation of Venezuela. The Castilletes Formation was deposited in a shallow marine (estuarine, lagoonal, and shallow subtidal) to fluvio-deltaic environment with strong fluvial influence. The Castilletes Formation correlates with the upper Cerro Pelado and Querales Formations of the Venezuelan Falcón Basin. This unit is also correlative with the Cantaure Formation of the Paraguaná Peninsula in Venezuela.

The marine invertebrate fauna of the Ware Formation shows a greater similarity with modern assemblages offshore of the Guajira Peninsula than with those of the underlying units. The base of the Ware Formation was deposited in a fluvio-deltaic environment, whereas the marine invertebrate assemblage at the top of the unit contains taxa typical of exposed open-ocean shoreface and nearshore settings, but with proximity to coral reef habitats. The Ware Formation correlates with the San Gregorio Formation in the Venezuelan Falcón Basin.

=== Tectonic history ===
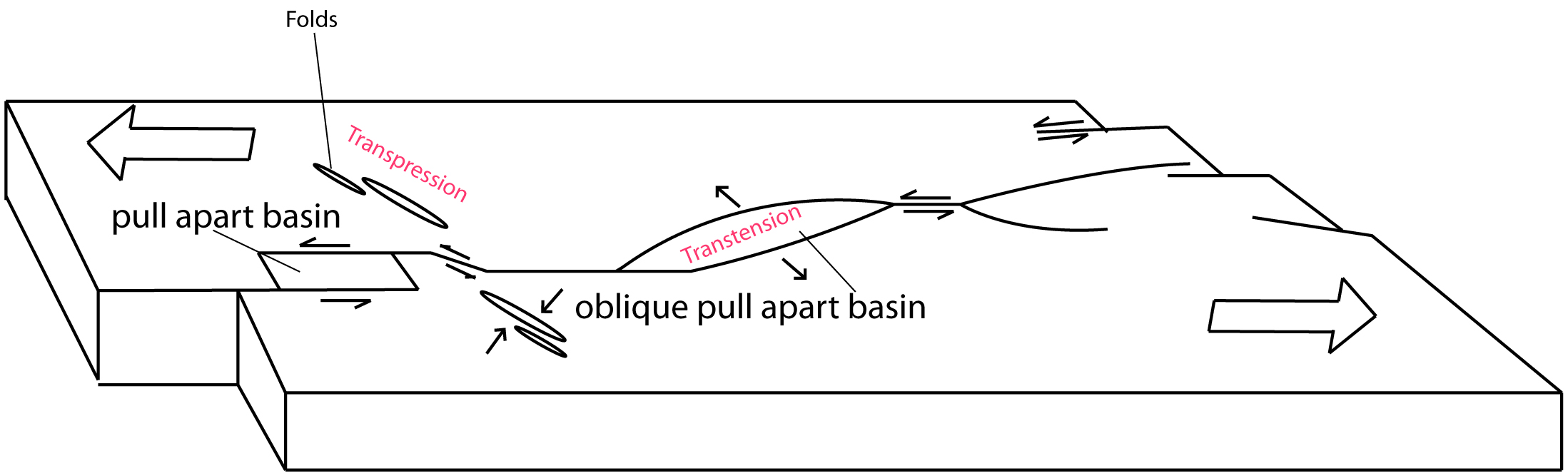
Sketch of a pull-apart basin

Paleogeography of Colombia
| 65 Ma |
| 50 Ma |
| 35 Ma |
| 20 Ma |
| Present |

The tectonic history of the Cocinetas Basin, a pull-apart basin formed on top of Mesozoic basement underlain by oceanic crust, goes back to the Paleogene. Farther to the south, in the Cesar-Ranchería Basin, the Paleocene, absent in the Cocinetas Basin, is represented by the first neotropic forest in the world, with megafauna as the largest recorded snake, Titanoboa cerrejonensis, with an estimated length of 14 metres (46 ft) and a weight of 1,135 kilograms (2,502 lb), today found in the Cerrejón Formation, dated to 60 to 58 Ma. It has been estimated on the basis of the fossil flora, pollen and large reptiles that the mean annual temperature was between 28.5 and 33 °C (83.3 and 91.4 °F) and yearly precipitation ranging from 2,260 to 4,640 millimetres (89 to 183 in) per year.

North of the Oca Fault, the oldest sedimentary sequence of the Cocinetas Basin, the Macarao Formation, is the oldest sedimentary unit of both the higher La Guajira area (the Cocinetas Basin) as well as the lower La Guajira area. This formation was deposited in a phase that is informally called "rifting", because of the formation of half grabens in the Late Eocene, though no real rifting occurred in the area. Shortly after deposition, during the Early Oligocene, the Macarao Formation was heavily deformed, creating the series of hills that today still surround the Cocinetas Basin. This transtensional deformation was caused by the eastward movement of the Caribbean Plate along the South American Plate, when the Caribbean volcanic arc was located just north of the Cocinetas Basin. The main fault movement forming the pull-apart basin of Cocinetas was caused by the dextral Cuisa Fault, active from the Paleocene to the Eocene.

The transtensional phase of the Early Oligocene was followed by the deposition of the unconformably overlying Siamaná Formation, characterised by a basal sequence of conglomerates, indicating tectonic uplift in the provenance areas, followed by reefal limestones rich in corals and algae. A new phase of transtension took place in the Early to Middle Miocene, when the Uitpa, Jimol and Castilletes Formations were deposited. The initial phase of uplift of the Isthmus of Panama, has been dated to this period, at around 12 Ma.

The Andean orogeny, represented by the tectonic uplift of the Colombian Eastern Ranges and its northern extension, the Serranía del Perijá, caused tilting and uplift in the Cocinetas Basin in the Late Miocene and Early Pliocene, when the Neogene hiatus separates the Castilletes Formation from the Ware Formation. The end of the Neogene corresponded to a marine platform setting, interrupted by the presence of a series of highs; the present-day mountain ranges of the region. Between these elevated areas, reefal limestones were deposited in a relatively quiet marine environment. During the Andean orogenic phase, the paleotemperatures in the basin dropped considerably; in the Baja Guajira area from 115 °C (239 °F) in the Early Miocene to 70 °C (158 °F) in the Late Miocene. In the Late Miocene to Pliocene, the major faults to the southwest of the Cocinetas Basin, the Oca and Bucaramanga-Santa Marta Faults were tectonically active.

== Paleontology ==
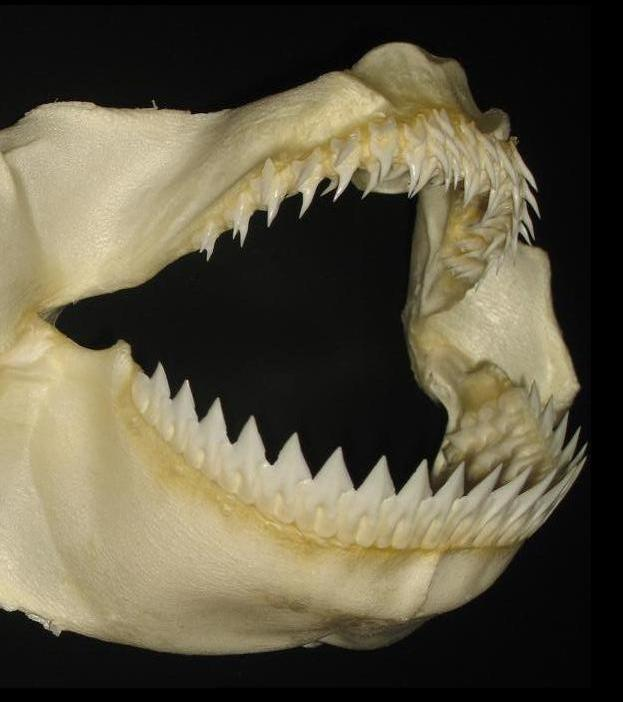
The Uitpa Formation provided fossils of the kitefin shark (Dalatias licha)

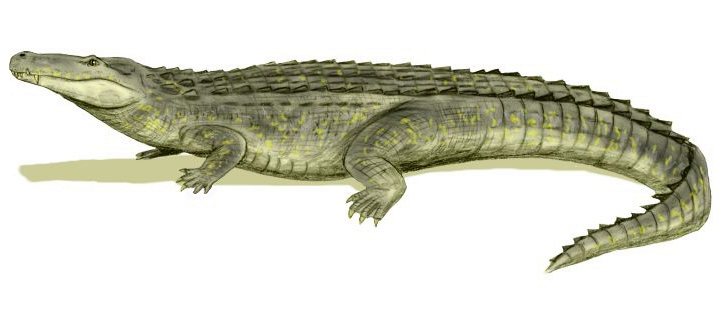
Fossils of Purussaurus were found in the Castilletes Formation

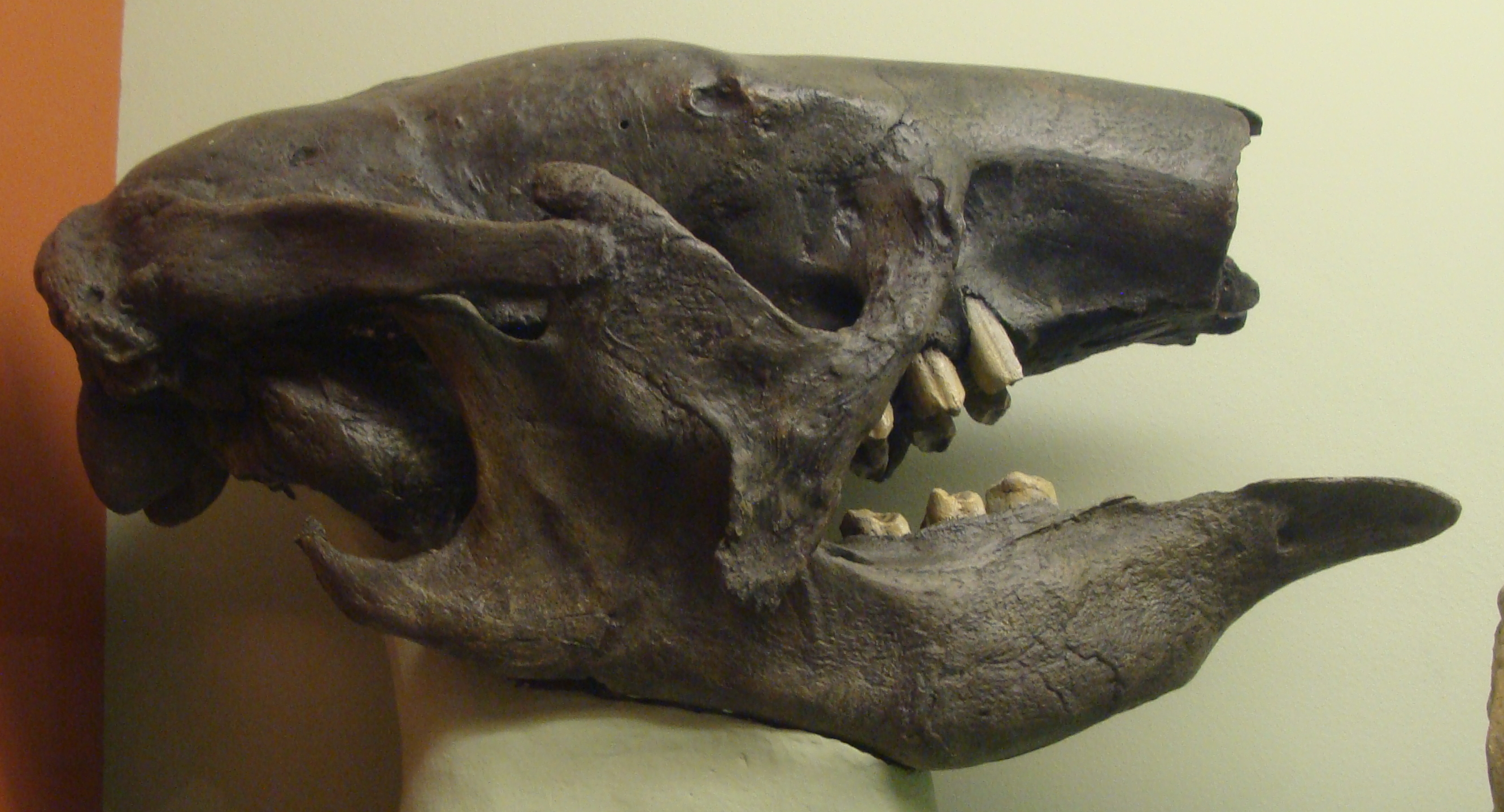
Nothrotherium is one of the many ground sloth genera found in the Ware Formation

The Cocinetas Basin has provided several new species and genera of vertebrates and invertebrates of which many are still studied in detail. The Uitpa, Jimol, Castilletes, and Ware Formations preserve both a diverse continental vertebrate and a rich marine invertebrate fossil record that documents paleoenvironmental change through the Neogene. This succession shows a broad pattern of changing depositional environments associated with the tectonic history of the Cocinetas Basin. Paleobathymetric and paleoenvironmental analyses suggest that the lower Uitpa Formation accumulated in water depths ranging from 100 to 200 metres (330 to 660 ft), a deepening with respect to the underlying Siamaná Formation and leading to the collapse of coral reefs. This contrasts with an observed increase in sediment supply for the San Luis coral-reef ecosystems in the northwestern Falcón Basin.

The Castilletes turtle fauna shares two taxa with the Middle Miocene La Venta Fauna (Chelus colombiana and Chelonoidis sp.), and one taxon with the Late Miocene of the Urumaco Formation and Western Amazonia areas. At least two hypotheses can be proposed to explain the early to middle Miocene geographical distribution of turtles in tropical South America. The first is based on the existence of the Pebas wetland system during the Middle Miocene, which could have served as a route for the dispersion of taxa facilitated by the connectivity between major and minor drainages, even with potential interruptions to this system due to the increasing uplifting of the Eastern Ranges of Colombia. Alternatively, the geographical distribution of tropical South American turtles during the Miocene can be explained as a relict of an extensive distribution reached during the Eocene or Oligocene and modified subsequently by the uplifting of the Andes and the changes in the pattern of the main river systems.

The occurrence of Purussaurus and Mourasuchus in the early Middle Miocene Patajau and Kaitamana beds of the Castilletes Formation represent early records for lineages previously known from younger Laventan and Huayquerian faunas. These records expand the temporal range of high diversity gavialoid-caimanine assemblages into the early Middle Miocene. The Castilletes Formation record also expands the geographic range of Miocene endemic crocodilian faunas to latitudes equivalent to those of Central America. The connections between hydrographic basins and the development of mega-wetland systems in equatorial South America allowed the long persistence of several lineages over an extensive geographical range. The extinction of gavialoids and specialized caimanines in equatorial South America was likely caused by the isolation and aridification of peripheral basins, together with the disappearance of mega-wetlands.

The sloths from the Late Pliocene Ware Formation are represented by 12 specimens that belong to 5 taxa from the 4 families of ground sloths. Their body sizes span over two orders of magnitude, and they most likely featured various feeding strategies, documenting a highly diverse assemblage of sloths from the Neotropics. Although geographically close to the Isthmus of Panama, and temporally preceding the first phase of the Great American Biotic Interchange by only 200,000 to 400,000 years, the sloths for which unambiguous affinities were recovered are not closely related to the early immigrants found in North America before the first main pulse of the Great American Biotic interchange. The registered giant capybara Hydrochoeropsis wayuu is the northernmost South American Pliocene hydrochoerine record and the nearest to the Panamanian bridge. The presence of this hydrochoerine, together with the fluvio-deltaic environment of the Ware Formation, suggests that during the Late Pliocene, the environment that dominated the Guajira Peninsula was more humid and with permanent water bodies, in contrast with its modern desert habitats.

=== Fossil content ===
| Formation | Group | Fossils | Notes |
|---|---|---|---|
| Ware Formation | Mammals | Camelidae, Glyptodontidae, Pampatheriidae, Proterotheriidae, Toxodontidae, Caviidae, Erethizontidae | |
| Ware Formation | Mammals | Tardigrada gen. et sp. indet. | |
| Ware Formation | Mammals | Mylodontidae gen. et sp. indet. | |
| Ware Formation | Mammals | Lestodontini gen. et sp. nov. | |
| Ware Formation | Mammals | Scelidotheriinae gen. et sp. indet., ?Hyperleptus sp. | |
| Ware Formation | Mammals | Megalonychidae gen. et sp. nov. | |
| Ware Formation | Mammals | Pliomegatherium lelongi | |
| Ware Formation | Mammals | Nothrotherium sp. | |
| Ware Formation | Mammals | Chapalmalania sp. | |
| Ware Formation | Mammals | Hydrochoeropsis wayuu | |
| Ware Formation | Reptiles | Crocodylus sp., Crocodylidae indet., Alligatoridae, Podocnemididae | |
| Ware Formation | Fish | Characidae, Cynodontidae, Serrasalmidae, Cichlidae, Sciaenidae, Doradidae, Pimelodidae, Carcharhinidae, Sphyrnidae, Myliobatidae, Pristidae | |
| Ware Formation | Invertebrates | Argopecten sp., Euvola sp., Nodipecten sp., Crassostrea sp., Plicatula sp., Spondylus sp., Anodontia sp., Codakia sp., Bulla sp., Laevicardium sp., Trachycardium sp., Macrocallista sp. | |
| Castilletes Formation | Mammals | Hilarcotherium miyou, Lycopsis padillai, Neodolodus cf. colombianus, Astrapotheriidae, Odontoceti, Mysticeti, Glyptodontidae, Pampatheriidae, Macraucheniidae, Proterotheriidae, Leontinidae, Toxodontidae, Interatheriidae, Megatheriidae, Dinomyidae, Sirenia, Sparassodonta | |
| Castilletes Formation | Crocodiles | Gavialoidea gen. et sp. indet. | |
| Castilletes Formation | Crocodiles | Alligatoridae gen. et sp. indet. | |
| Castilletes Formation | Crocodiles | cf. Purussaurus sp. | |
| Castilletes Formation | Crocodiles | cf. Mourasuchus sp. | |
| Castilletes Formation | Crocodiles | Crocodylidae gen et sp. indet. | |
| Castilletes Formation | Crocodiles | cf. Crocodylus sp. | |
| Castilletes Formation | Crocodiles | Eusuchia incertae sedis | |
| Castilletes Formation | Crocodiles | cf. Eusuchia gen et sp. indet. | |
| Castilletes Formation | Turtles | Podocnemididae incertae sedis | |
| Castilletes Formation | Turtles | Chelus colombiana | |
| Castilletes Formation | Turtles | Chelus sp. | |
| Castilletes Formation | Turtles | Chelonoidis sp. | |
| Castilletes Formation | Squamata | Boidae | |
| Castilletes Formation | Birds | Aves indet. | |
| Castilletes Formation | Fishes | Characidae, Serrasalmidae, Sciaenidae, Sparidae, Sphyraenidae, Ariidae, Callichthyidae, Doradidae, Pimelodidae, Carcharhinidae, Hemigaleidae, Sphyrnidae, Lamnidae, Otodontidae, Dasyatidae, Myliobatidae, Rhinopteridae, Ginglymostomatidae, Pristiophoridae, Pristidae, Rhynchobatidae, Rhynobatidae, Lepidosirenidae | |
| Castilletes Formation | Invertebrates | Calliostoma sp., Arene sp., Nerita cf. fulgurans, Neritina n. sp. aff. woodwadi, Modulus tamanensis, Turritella (Bactrospira) sp. cf. altilira, Turritella (Turritella) cocoditana, Turritella (Turritella) machapoorensis, Turritella (Turritella) matarucana, Architectonica (Architectonica) nobilis, Bittium sp., Rhinoclavis (Ochetoclava) venada, Potamides suprasulcatus, Terebralia dentilabris, Petaloconchus sculpturatus, Bostrycapulus sp., Crepidula cantaurana, Crepidula insculpta, Crepidula plana, Calyptraea sp. cf. centralis, Crucibulum (Dispotaea) sp. cf. springvaleense, Aylacostoma n. sp., Doryssa n. sp., Sheppardiconcha n. sp., Charadreon n. sp., Natica sp., Naticarius sp., Glossaulax paraguanensis, Polinices sp. cf. nelsoni, Sinum gabbi, Stigmaulax sp., Strombus sp., Malea sp., Bursa rugosa, Ficus sp. cf. carbasea, Distorsio sp., Chicoreus (Triplex) sp. cf. cornurectus, Chicoreus (Triplex) corrigendum, Luria sp., Muracypraea sp. cf. hyaena, Calotrophon sp. cf. gatunensis, Cymia cocoditana, Eupleura kugleri, Hesperisternia sp., Phyllonotus n. sp., Siphonochelus (Laevityphis) cf. sawkinsi, Siratus cf. denegatus, Vokesimurex sp. cf. gilli, Antillophos sp. cf. gatunensis, Cymatophos cocoditana, Cymatophos paraguanensis, Gordanops sp. cf. baranoanus, Pallacera maracaibensis, Solenosteira sp., Granolaria sp. cf. gorgasiana, Latirus sp., Nassarius sp., Turbinella falconensis, Melongena consors, Anachis sp., Sincola sp., Strombina sp., Persicula venezuelana, Prunum quirosense, Agaronia sp. aff. testacea, Oliva sp., Aphera sp., Bivetiella sp. cf. gabbiana, Euclia sp. cf. dinota, Euclia werenfelsi, Narona sp., Trigonostoma woodringi, Conus sp. aff. jaspideus, Agladrillia sp., Crassispira conica, Fusiturricula sp., Gemmula vaningeni, Glyphostoma dentiferum, Paraborsonia cantaurana, "Chiton" sp., Saccella gnomon, Noetia dauleana, Bulla sp., Crenella sp., Brachidontes sp., Atrina sp., Argopecten sp., Anadara (Rasia) democraciana, Anadara (Rasia) tirantensis, Conus sp. cf. chipolanus, Conus sp. cf. molis, Conus talis, Strioterebrum ulloa, Terebra (Paraterebra) sulcifera, Clathrodrillia sp., Cruziturricula sp., Hindsiclava henekeni, Knefastia sp., Polystira sp., Adrana sp., Politoleda forcati, Anadara (Cunearca) zuliana, Anadara (Grandiarca) chiriquiensis, Anadara (Potiarca) inutilis, Anadara (Rasia) sp. cf. cornellana, Anadara (Tosarca) sp. cf. veatchi, Tucetona sp. cf. democraciana, Mytilus sp. cf. canoasensis, Anomia peruviana, Cavilinga sp., Lucinisca mirandana, Diplodonta sp., Harvella elegans, Mulinia sp., Raeta sp., Angulus sp., ?Macoma sp., Strigilla sp., Leopecten sp., Lindapecten buchivacoanus, Crassostrea sp., Dendostrea democraciana, Plicatula sp., Anodontia sp., Lucina sp. cf. pensylvanica, Phacoides sp. cf. pectinatus, Glyptoactis paraguanensis, Arcinella yaquensis, Chama berjadinensis, Dallocardia sp. cf. sanctidavidis, Apiocardia n. sp. aff. aminensis, Crassinella sp., Eucrassatella (Hybolophus) venezuelana, Micromactra maracaibensis, Eurytellina paraguanensis, Psammacoma falconensis, Psammotreta hadra, Donax sp., Tagelus (Mesopleura) n. sp. aff. divisus, Solecurtus sp., Solena sp., Abra sp., Agriopoma (Pitarella) paraguanensis, Hysteroconcha sp., Leukoma sp., Pitar sp., Transennella sp., Tenuicorbula n. sp. aff. lupina, Semele sp., Chione sp., Chionopsis paraguanensis, Clementia dariena, Cyclinella venezuelana, Dosinia sp., Lamelliconcha labreana, Lirophora quirosensis, Macrocallista n. sp. aff. maculata, Panchione n. sp. aff. macrtropsis, Caryocorbula fortis, Caryocorbula quirosana, Hexacorbula cruziana, Dentalium sp., Balanidae indet., Buccinidae indet., Callianassidae indet., Pectinidae indet., Portunidae indet., Ranellidae indet., Sphaeriidae indet., Sportellidae indet., Tellinidae indet., Turridae indet., Unioidae indet., Veneridae indet. | |
| Jimol Formation | Reptiles | Crocodylidae, Gavialidae | |
| Jimol Formation | Fishes | Dalatiidae, Myliobatidae, Lamnidae, Hemigaleidae, Carcharhinidae | |
| Jimol Formation | Invertebrates | Calliostoma sp., Turbo sp., Modulus tamanensis, Turritella (Bactrospira) sp. cf. altilira, Turritella (Turritella) cocoditana, Turritella (Turritella) machapoorensis, Turritella (Turritella) matarucana, Architectonica (Architectonica) nobilis, Rhinoclavis (Ochetoclava) venada, Potamides suprasulcatus, Terebralia dentilabris, Petaloconchus sculpturatus, Cirsotrema undulatum, Crepidula cantaurana, Crepidula insculpta, Crepidula plana, Calyptraea sp. cf. centralis, Crucibulum (Dispotaea) sp. cf. springvaleense, Trochita trochiformis, Charadreon n. sp., Natica sp., Naticarius sp., Glossaulax paraguanensis, Polinices sp. cf. nelsoni, Sinum gabbi, Stigmaulax sp., Pachycrommium sp., Orthaulax sp., Strombus sp., Ficus sp. cf. carbasea, Luria sp., Muracypraea sp. cf. hyaena, Calotrophon sp. cf. gatunensis, Cymia cocoditana, Eupleura kugleri, Siphonochelus (Laevityphis) cf. sawkinsi, Siratus cf. denegatus, Vokesimurex sp. cf. gilli, Antillophos sp. cf. gatunensis, Cymatophos cocoditana, Cymatophos paraguanensis, Vasum quirosense, Solenosteira sp., Latirus sp., Turbinella falconensis, Melongena consors, Anachis sp., Strombina sp., Persicula venezuelana, Prunum quirosense, Conomitra sp., Eburna sp., Oliva sp., Olivella sp., Bivetiella sp. cf. gabbiana, Euclia werenfelsi, Saccella gracillima, Glycymeris sp., Amusium aguaclarense, Conus sp. cf. chipolanus, Conus sp. cf. molis, Conus talis, Strioterebrum ulloa, Terebra (Paraterebra) sulcifera, Clathrodrillia sp., Cruziturricula sp., Hindsiclava henekeni, Knefastia sp., Polystira sp., Adrana sp., Politoleda forcati, Anadara (Cunearca) zuliana, Anadara (Grandiarca) chiriquiensis, Anadara (Potiarca) inutilis, Anadara (Rasia) sp. cf. cornellana, Anadara (Tosarca) sp. cf. veatchi, Tucetona sp. cf. democraciana, Mytilus sp. cf. canoasensis, Paraleptopecten quirosensis, Hyotissa sp., Spondylus sp., Pseudochama quirosana, Trachycardium sp., Leopecten sp., Lindapecten buchivacoanus, Crassostrea sp., Dendostrea democraciana, Plicatula sp., Anodontia sp., Lucina sp. cf. pensylvanica, Phacoides sp. cf. pectinatus, Glyptoactis paraguanensis, Arcinella yaquensis, Chama berjadinensis, Dallocardia sp. cf. sanctidavidis, Apiocardia n. sp. aff. aminensis, Crassinella sp., Eucrassatella (Hybolophus) venezuelana, Micromactra maracaibensis, Eurytellina paraguanensis, Psammacoma falconensis, Psammotreta hadra, Donax sp., Tagelus (Mesopleura) n. sp. aff. divisus, Solecurtus sp., Solena sp., Abra sp., Anomalocardia sp., Globivenus palmeri, Semele sp., Chione sp., Chionopsis paraguanensis, Clementia dariena, Cyclinella venezuelana, Dosinia sp., Lamelliconcha labreana, Lirophora quirosensis, Macrocallista n. sp. aff. maculata, Panchione n. sp. aff. macrtropsis, Caryocorbula fortis, Caryocorbula quirosana, Hexacorbula cruziana, Dentalium sp., Balanidae indet., Callianassidae indet., Cidaroida indet., Echinoida indet., Turridae indet., Veneridae indet. | |
| Uitpa Formation | Fishes | Heptranchias cf. howellii, Centrophorus sp., Dalatias cf. licha, Pristiophorus sp., Isurus cf. oxyrinchus, Carcharocles sp., Alopias cf. superciliosus, Hemipristis serra, Carcharhinus gibbesii, Sphyrna laevissima, Mobula sp., Lamniformes indet., Teleostei indet. | |
| Uitpa Formation | Invertebrates | Turritella sp., Xenophora sp., Architectonica nobilis, Glossaulax sp., Orthaulax sp., Gorgasina sp., Adrana sp., Saccella sp., Limopsis sp., Mimachlamys canalis, Cyclopecten sp., Propeamussium sp., Ostrea sp., Pteria sp., Lucinoma sp., Psammacoma sp., Chionopsis sp., Antalis sp., Fissidentalium sp., Turridae indet. | |
| Siamaná Formation | Invertebrates | Mimachlamys canalis, Ostrea sp. | |
| Macarao Formation | Invertebrates | Glyptoactis carmenensis, Ostrea aff. restinensis, Turritella chira, Venericardia (Venericor) guajirensis, Cardium spp., Membranipora sp., Nucleolites (Cassidulus) sp., Ogivalina sp., Pitar (Lamelliconcha) sp., Robulus sp., ?Stamenocella sp., Textularia sp. | |

== See also ==
- Cesar-Ranchería Basin
- Honda Group
- Urumaco
