= Castilletes Formation =

Geological formation in Colombia

- Stratigraphic range: Burdigalian-Langhian (Colloncuran-Friasian); ~16.7–14.2 Ma
- Type: Geological formation
- Unit of: Cocinetas Basin
- Underlies: Ware Formation
- Overlies: Jimol Formation
- Thickness: up to 440 m (1,440 ft)

Lithology
- Primary: Mudstone, siltstone
- Other: Sandstone

Location
- Coordinates: 11°56′48.48″N 71°19′56″W
- Approximate paleocoordinates: 11.2°N 68.6°W
- Region: La Guajira; Caribbean region
- Country: Colombia

Type section
- Named for: Castilletes
- Named by: Rollins
- Location: Uribia
- Year defined: 1965
- Coordinates: 11°56′48.48″N 71°19′56″W
- Region: La Guajira
- Country: Colombia
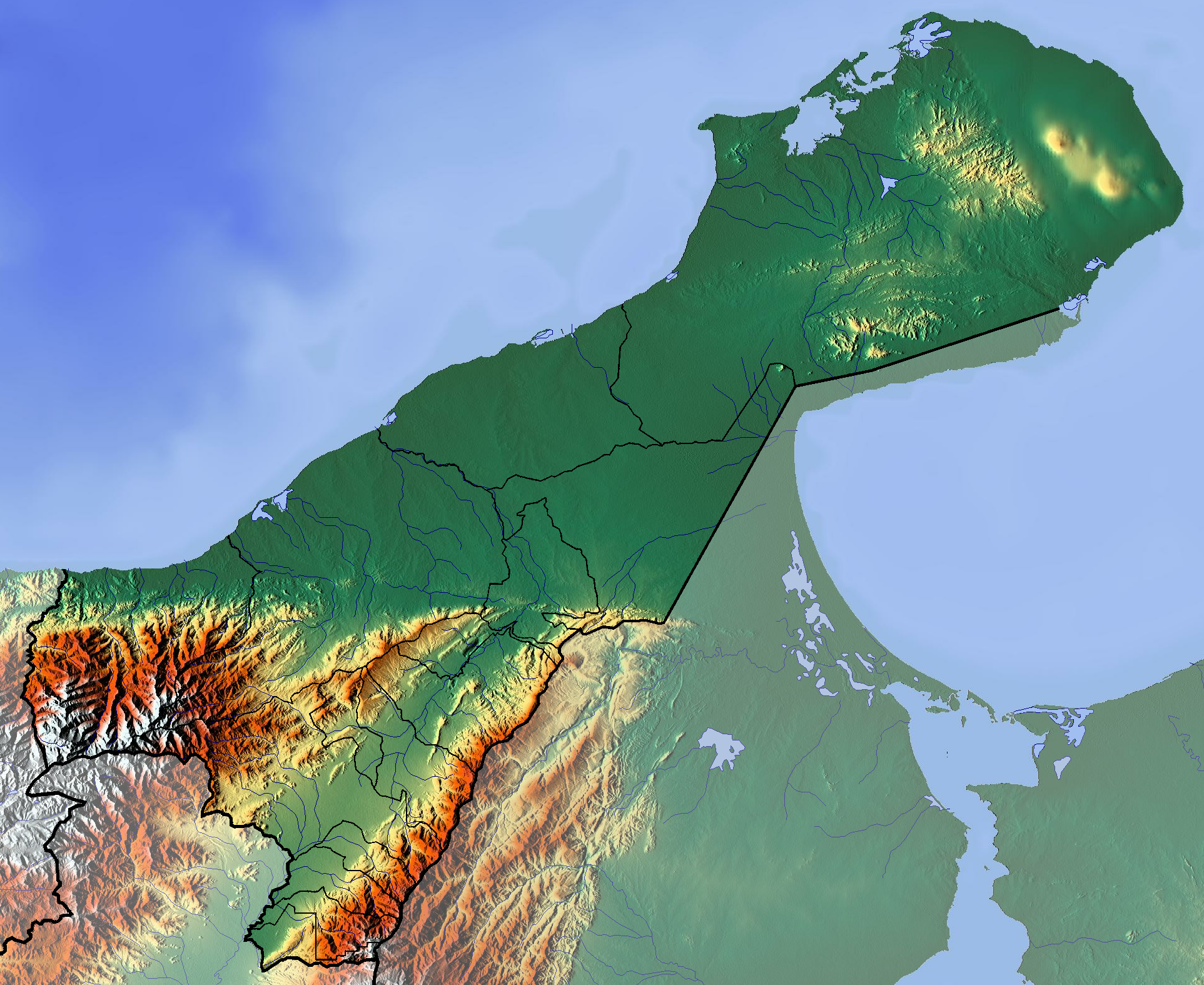
- Type locality of the formation in La Guajira

The Castilletes Formation (Spanish: Formación Castilletes, N1c) is a fossiliferous geological formation of the Cocinetas Basin in the northernmost department of La Guajira, Colombia. The formation consists of fossiliferous mudstones, siltstones and medium-grained to conglomeratic fossiliferous lithic to quartzitic sandstones. The Castilletes Formation dates to the Neogene period; Burdigalian to Langhian stages, Colloncuran and Friasian in the SALMA classification, and has a maximum thickness of 440 metres (1,440 ft).

== Etymology ==
The formation was defined by Rollins in 1965 and named after the village of Castilletes.

== Description ==
=== Lithologies ===
The Castilletes Formation consists of fossiliferous mudstones, siltstones and medium-grained to conglomeratic fossiliferous lithic to quartzitic sandstones.

=== Stratigraphy and depositional environment ===
The Castilletes Formation overlies the Jimol Formation and is overlain by the Ware Formation. The age has been estimated to be Middle Miocene (16.7 to 14.2 Ma), Colloncuran and Friasian in the SALMA classification. The invertebrate fauna of the Castilletes Formation is highly similar not only to that of the underlying Jimol Formation, but also to the Cantaure Formation of Venezuela. The Castilletes Formation was deposited in a shallow marine (estuarine, lagoonal, and shallow subtidal) to fluvio-deltaic environment with strong fluvial influence. The Castilletes Formation correlates with the upper Cerro Pelado and Querales Formations of the Venezuelan Falcón Basin. This unit is also correlative with the Cantaure Formation of the Paraguaná Peninsula in Venezuela.

=== Fossil content ===
Group	Fossils	Notes
Mammals	Hilarcotherium miyou, Lycopsis padillai, Neodolodus cf. colombianus, ?Hyperleptus sp., Astrapotheriidae, Odontoceti, Mysticeti, Glyptodontidae, Pampatheriidae, Macraucheniidae, Proterotheriidae, Leontinidae, Toxodontidae, Interatheriidae, Megatheriidae, Dinomyidae, Sirenia, Sparassodonta	
Crocodiles	Gavialoidea gen. et sp. indet.	
Crocodiles	Alligatoridae gen. et sp. indet.	
Crocodiles	cf. Purussaurus sp.	
Crocodiles	cf. Mourasuchus sp.	
Crocodiles	Crocodylidae gen et sp. indet.	
Crocodiles	cf. Crocodylus sp.	
Crocodiles	Eusuchia incertae sedis	
Crocodiles	cf. Eusuchia gen et sp. indet.	
Turtles	Podocnemididae incertae sedis	
Turtles	Chelus colombiana	
Turtles	Chelus sp.	
Turtles	Chelonoidis sp.	
Snakes	Boidae	
Birds	Aves indet.	
Fishes	Megalodon, Characidae, Serrasalmidae, Sciaenidae, Sparidae, Sphyraenidae, Ariidae, Callichthyidae, Doradidae, Pimelodidae, Carcharhinidae, Hemigaleidae, Sphyrnidae, Lamnidae, Otodontidae, Dasyatidae, Myliobatidae, Rhinopteridae, Ginglymostomatidae, Pristiophoridae, Pristidae, Rhynchobatidae, Rhynobatidae, Lepidosirenidae	
Invertebrates	Calliostoma sp., Arene sp., Nerita cf. fulgurans, Neritina n. sp. aff. woodwadi, Modulus tamanensis, Turritella (Bactrospira) sp. cf. altilira, Turritella (Turritella) cocoditana, Turritella (Turritella) machapoorensis, Turritella (Turritella) matarucana, Architectonica (Architectonica) nobilis, Bittium sp., Rhinoclavis (Ochetoclava) venada, Potamides suprasulcatus, Terebralia dentilabris, Petaloconchus sculpturatus, Bostrycapulus sp., Crepidula cantaurana, Crepidula insculpta, Crepidula plana, Calyptraea sp. cf. centralis, Crucibulum (Dispotaea) sp. cf. springvaleense, Aylacostoma n. sp., Doryssa n. sp., Sheppardiconcha n. sp., Charadreon n. sp., Natica sp., Naticarius sp., Glossaulax paraguanensis, Polinices sp. cf. nelsoni, Sinum gabbi, Stigmaulax sp., Strombus sp., Malea sp., Bursa rugosa, Ficus sp. cf. carbasea, Distorsio sp., Chicoreus (Triplex) sp. cf. cornurectus, Chicoreus (Triplex) corrigendum, Luria sp., Muracypraea sp. cf. hyaena, Calotrophon sp. cf. gatunensis, Cymia cocoditana, Eupleura kugleri, Hesperisternia sp., Phyllonotus n. sp., Siphonochelus (Laevityphis) cf. sawkinsi, Siratus cf. denegatus, Vokesimurex sp. cf. gilli, Antillophos sp. cf. gatunensis, Cymatophos cocoditana, Cymatophos paraguanensis, Gordanops sp. cf. baranoanus, Pallacera maracaibensis, Solenosteira sp., Granolaria sp. cf. gorgasiana, Latirus sp., Nassarius sp., Turbinella falconensis, Melongena consors, Anachis sp., Sincola sp., Strombina sp., Persicula venezuelana, Prunum quirosense, Agaronia sp. aff. testacea, Oliva sp., Aphera sp., Bivetiella sp. cf. gabbiana, Euclia sp. cf. dinota, Euclia werenfelsi, Narona sp., Trigonostoma woodringi, Conus sp. aff. jaspideus, Agladrillia sp., Crassispira conica, Fusiturricula sp., Gemmula vaningeni, Glyphostoma dentiferum, Paraborsonia cantaurana, "Chiton" sp., Saccella gnomon, Noetia dauleana, Bulla sp., Crenella sp., Brachidontes sp., Atrina sp., Argopecten sp., Anadara (Rasia) democraciana, Anadara (Rasia) tirantensis, Conus sp. cf. chipolanus, Conus sp. cf. molis, Conus talis, Strioterebrum ulloa, Terebra (Paraterebra) sulcifera, Clathrodrillia sp., Cruziturricula sp., Hindsiclava henekeni, Knefastia sp., Polystira sp., Adrana sp., Politoleda forcati, Anadara (Cunearca) zuliana, Anadara (Grandiarca) chiriquiensis, Anadara (Potiarca) inutilis, Anadara (Rasia) sp. cf. cornellana, Anadara (Tosarca) sp. cf. veatchi, Tucetona sp. cf. democraciana, Mytilus sp. cf. canoasensis, Anomia peruviana, Cavilinga sp., Lucinisca mirandana, Diplodonta sp., Harvella elegans, Mulinia sp., Raeta sp., Angulus sp., ?Macoma sp., Strigilla sp., Leopecten sp., Lindapecten buchivacoanus, Crassostrea sp., Dendostrea democraciana, Plicatula sp., Anodontia sp., Lucina sp. cf. pensylvanica, Phacoides sp. cf. pectinatus, Glyptoactis paraguanensis, Arcinella yaquensis, Chama berjadinensis, Dallocardia sp. cf. sanctidavidis, Apiocardia n. sp. aff. aminensis, Crassinella sp., Eucrassatella (Hybolophus) venezuelana, Micromactra maracaibensis, Eurytellina paraguanensis, Psammacoma falconensis, Psammotreta hadra, Donax sp., Tagelus (Mesopleura) n. sp. aff. divisus, Solecurtus sp., Solena sp., Abra sp., Agriopoma (Pitarella) paraguanensis, Hysteroconcha sp., Leukoma sp., Pitar sp., Transennella sp., Tenuicorbula n. sp. aff. lupina, Semele sp., Chione sp., Chionopsis paraguanensis, Clementia dariena, Cyclinella venezuelana, Dosinia sp., Lamelliconcha labreana, Lirophora quirosensis, Macrocallista n. sp. aff. maculata, Panchione n. sp. aff. macrtropsis, Caryocorbula fortis, Caryocorbula quirosana, Hexacorbula cruziana, Dentalium sp., Balanidae indet., Buccinidae indet., Callianassidae indet., Pectinidae indet., Portunidae indet., Ranellidae indet., Sphaeriidae indet., Sportellidae indet., Tellinidae indet., Turridae indet., Unioidae indet., Veneridae indet.	

== See also ==
Geology of the Eastern Hills
Cesar-Ranchería Basin
Honda Group
Abanico, Pebas, Pisco Formations
