= Jimol Formation =

Geological formation in Colombia

- Stratigraphic range: Burdigalian (Santacrucian); ~17.9–16.7 Ma
- Type: Geological formation
- Unit of: Cocinetas Basin
- Underlies: Castilletes Formation
- Overlies: Uitpa Formation
- Thickness: up to 203 m (666 ft)

Lithology
- Primary: Sandstone
- Other: Siltstone, mudstone

Location
- Coordinates: 11°58′00″N 71°22′43″W
- Region: La Guajira; Caribbean region
- Country: Colombia

Type section
- Named for: Cerro Jimol
- Named by: Renz
- Location: Uribia
- Year defined: 1960
- Coordinates: 11°58′00″N 71°22′43″W
- Region: La Guajira
- Country: Colombia
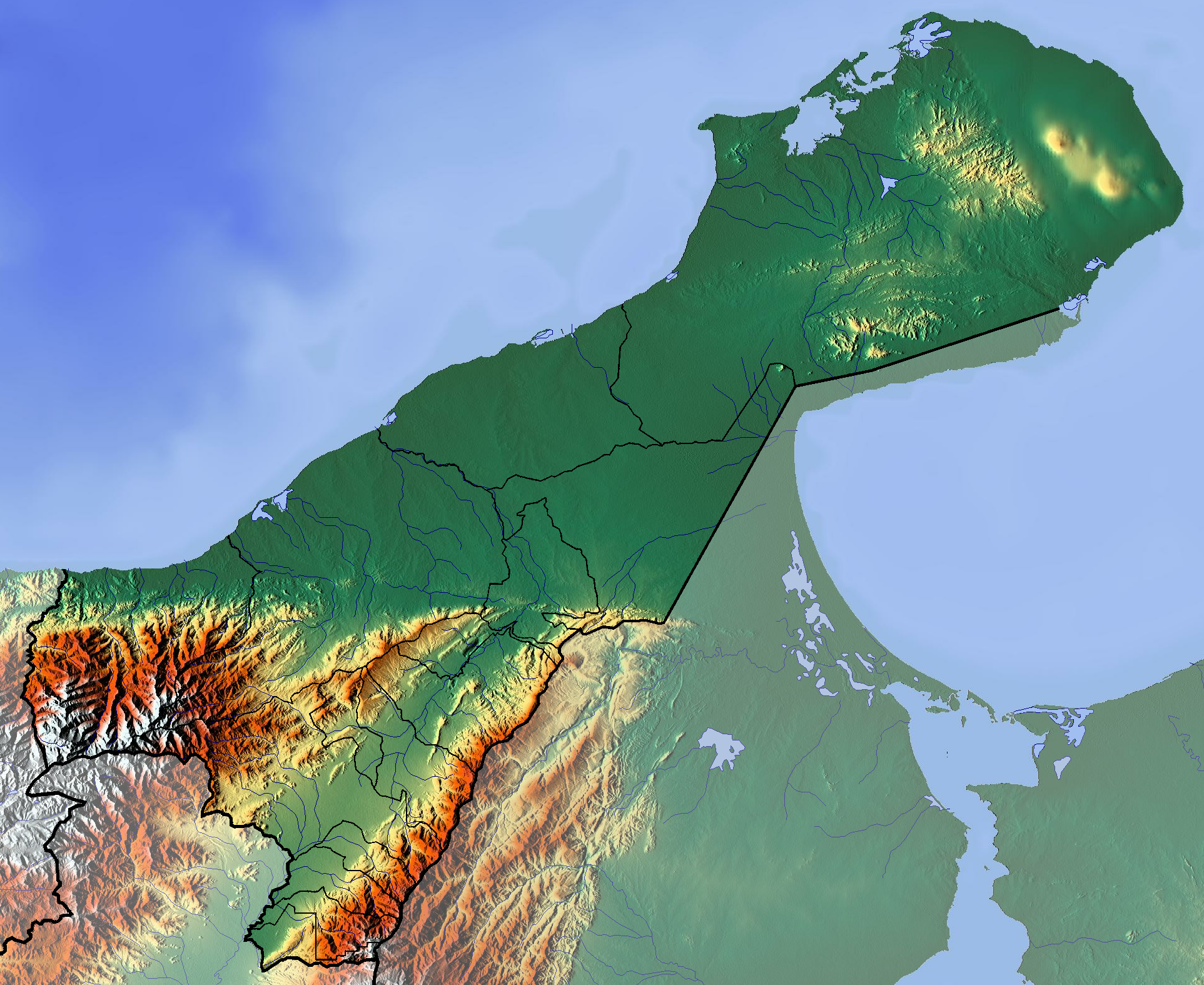
- Type locality of the formation in La Guajira

The Jimol Formation (Spanish: Formación Jimol, N1j) is a fossiliferous geological formation of the Cocinetas Basin in the northernmost department of La Guajira. The formation consists of calcareous lithic and fossiliferous sandstones, siltstones and mudstones. The Jimol Formation dates to the Neogene period; Burdigalian stage, Santacrucian in the SALMA classification, and has a maximum thickness of 203 metres (666 ft).

== Etymology ==
The formation was defined by Renz in 1960 and named after Cerro Jimol.

== Description ==
=== Lithologies ===
The Jimol Formation consists of calcareous lithic and fossiliferous sandstones, siltstones and mudstones.

=== Stratigraphy and depositional environment ===
The Jimol Formation overlies the Uitpa Formation and is overlain by the Castilletes Formation. The age has been estimated to be Early Miocene (17.9 to 16.7 Ma), corresponding to the Santacrucian in the SALMA classification. The invertebrate fauna of the Jimol Formation is similar to the fauna found in the latest Early Miocene Cantaure Formation of Venezuela and the Culebra Formation of Panama. The Jimol Formation was deposited in a beach to shallow marine environment, inner shelf depth (less than 50 metres' [160 ft] water depth). This unit is correlated with the upper Agua Clara and lower Cerro Pelao Formations of the Venezuelan Falcón Basin.

=== Petroleum geology ===
The Jimol Formation is a reservoir and seal rock formation in the Guajira Basin.

=== Fossil content ===
Group	Fossils	Notes
Reptiles	Crocodylidae, Gavialidae	
Fishes	Chilomycterus sp.	
Fishes	Dalatiidae, Myliobatidae, Lamnidae, Hemigaleidae, Carcharhinidae	
Invertebrates	Calliostoma sp., Turbo sp., Modulus tamanensis, Turritella (Bactrospira) sp. cf. altilira, Turritella (Turritella) cocoditana, Turritella (Turritella) machapoorensis, Turritella (Turritella) matarucana, Architectonica (Architectonica) nobilis, Rhinoclavis (Ochetoclava) venada, Potamides suprasulcatus, Terebralia dentilabris, Petaloconchus sculpturatus, Cirsotrema undulatum, Crepidula cantaurana, Crepidula insculpta, Crepidula plana, Calyptraea sp. cf. centralis, Crucibulum (Dispotaea) sp. cf. springvaleense, Trochita trochiformis, Charadreon n. sp., Natica sp., Naticarius sp., Glossaulax paraguanensis, Polinices sp. cf. nelsoni, Sinum gabbi, Stigmaulax sp., Pachycrommium sp., Orthaulax sp., Strombus sp., Ficus sp. cf. carbasea, Luria sp., Muracypraea sp. cf. hyaena, Calotrophon sp. cf. gatunensis, Cymia cocoditana, Eupleura kugleri, Siphonochelus (Laevityphis) cf. sawkinsi, Siratus cf. denegatus, Vokesimurex sp. cf. gilli, Antillophos sp. cf. gatunensis, Cymatophos cocoditana, Cymatophos paraguanensis, Vasum quirosense, Solenosteira sp., Latirus sp., Turbinella falconensis, Melongena consors, Anachis sp., Strombina sp., Persicula venezuelana, Prunum quirosense, Conomitra sp., Eburna sp., Oliva sp., Olivella sp., Bivetiella sp. cf. gabbiana, Euclia werenfelsi, Saccella gracillima, Glycymeris sp., Amusium aguaclarense, Conus sp. cf. chipolanus, Conus sp. cf. molis, Conus talis, Strioterebrum ulloa, Terebra (Paraterebra) sulcifera, Clathrodrillia sp., Cruziturricula sp., Hindsiclava henekeni, Knefastia sp., Polystira sp., Adrana sp., Politoleda forcati, Anadara (Cunearca) zuliana, Anadara (Grandiarca) chiriquiensis, Anadara (Potiarca) inutilis, Anadara (Rasia) sp. cf. cornellana, Anadara (Tosarca) sp. cf. veatchi, Tucetona sp. cf. democraciana, Mytilus sp. cf. canoasensis, Paraleptopecten quirosensis, Hyotissa sp., Spondylus sp., Pseudochama quirosana, Trachycardium sp., Leopecten sp., Lindapecten buchivacoanus, Crassostrea sp., Dendostrea democraciana, Plicatula sp., Anodontia sp., Lucina sp. cf. pensylvanica, Phacoides sp. cf. pectinatus, Glyptoactis paraguanensis, Arcinella yaquensis, Chama berjadinensis, Dallocardia sp. cf. sanctidavidis, Apiocardia n. sp. aff. aminensis, Crassinella sp., Eucrassatella (Hybolophus) venezuelana, Micromactra maracaibensis, Eurytellina paraguanensis, Psammacoma falconensis, Psammotreta hadra, Donax sp., Tagelus (Mesopleura) n. sp. aff. divisus, Solecurtus sp., Solena sp., Abra sp., Anomalocardia sp., Globivenus palmeri, Semele sp., Chione sp., Chionopsis paraguanensis, Clementia dariena, Cyclinella venezuelana, Dosinia sp., Lamelliconcha labreana, Lirophora quirosensis, Macrocallista n. sp. aff. maculata, Panchione n. sp. aff. macrtropsis, Caryocorbula fortis, Caryocorbula quirosana, Hexacorbula cruziana, Dentalium sp., Balanidae indet., Callianassidae indet., Cidaroida indet., Echinoida indet., Turridae indet., Veneridae indet.	

== See also ==
Geology of the Eastern Hills
Cesar-Ranchería Basin
Honda Group
Abanico Formation
