= Macarao Formation =

Geological formation

- Stratigraphic range: Mid-Late Eocene; ~40–34 Ma
- Type: Geological formation
- Unit of: Cocinetas Basin
- Underlies: Castilletes Fm., Siamaná Fm.
- Overlies: Guaralamai Fm. Jarara Schist (basement)
- Thickness: 253 m (830 ft)

Lithology
- Primary: Calcareous sandstone
- Other: Siltstone, gypsum

Location
- Coordinates: 11°50′00″N 71°24′46″W
- Region: La Guajira; Caribbean region
- Country: Colombia

Type section
- Named by: Rollins
- Location: Uribia
- Year defined: 1965
- Coordinates: 11°50′00″N 71°24′46″W
- Region: La Guajira
- Country: Colombia
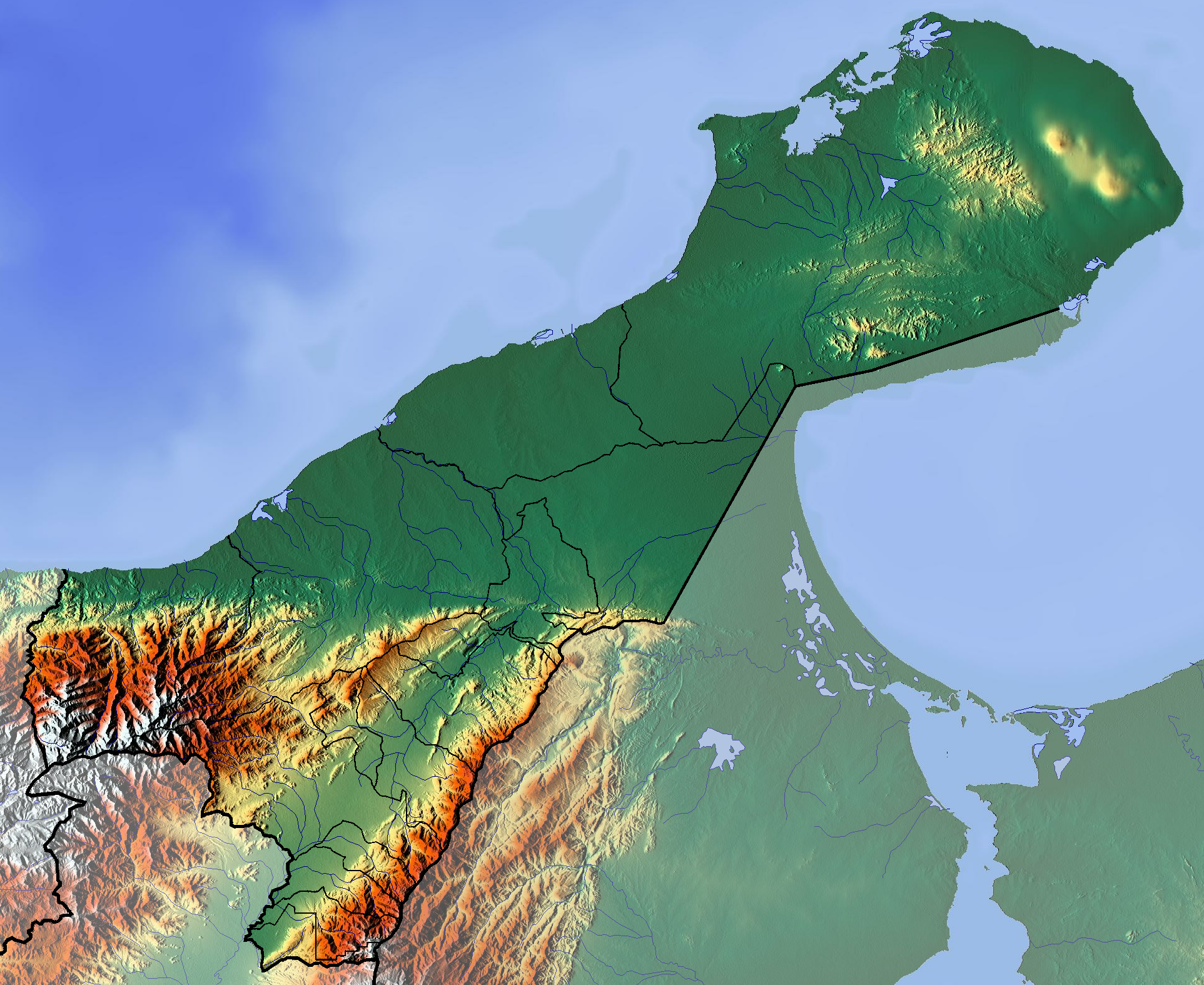
- Type locality of the formation in La Guajira

The Macarao Formation (Spanish: Formación Macarao, E2m) is a geological formation of the Cocinetas Basin in the northernmost Colombian department of La Guajira. The formation consists of foraminifera-rich fine to medium grained calcareous sandstones intercalated with calcareous siltstones, cross-cut by veins of gypsum. The 253 metres (830 ft) thick Macarao Formation dates to the Paleogene period; Middle to Late Eocene epoch, corresponding to the Divisaderan in the South American land mammal ages (SALMA).

== Definition ==
The formation was defined by Rollins in 1965.

== Description ==
=== Lithologies ===
The Macarao Formation consists of foraminifera-rich fine to medium grained calcareous sandstones intercalated with calcareous siltstones, cross-cut by veins of gypsum.

=== Stratigraphy and depositional environment ===
The Macarao Formation has a maximum thickness of 253 metres (830 ft) and overlies the Cretaceous Guaramalai Formation and the basement (Jarara Schist) and is overlain by the Siamaná and Castilletes Formations with a high angle unconformity. The age has been estimated to be Middle to Late Eocene, corresponding to the Divisaderan in the South American land mammal ages (SALMA). The formation has been deposited in a shallow marine bay environment.

=== Petroleum geology ===
The Macarao Formation is a reservoir rock formation in the Guajira Basin.

== See also ==
Geology of the Eastern Hills
Cesar-Ranchería Basin
Bogotá Formation
Chota, Loreto, Regadera, Soncco, Usme Formations
