= Ware Formation =

Geologic formation in Colombia

- Stratigraphic range: Late Miocene-Early Pleistocene, typically Pliocene; ~3.5–2.8 Ma
- Type: Geological formation
- Unit of: Cocinetas Basin
- Underlies: Alluvium
- Overlies: Castilletes Formation
- Thickness: up to 25 m (82 ft)

Lithology
- Primary: Sandstone, mudstone
- Other: Conglomerate

Location
- Coordinates: 11°51′4.32″N 71°19′26.4″W
- Approximate paleocoordinates: 11.7°N 70.8°W
- Region: La Guajira; Caribbean region
- Country: Colombia

Type section
- Named for: Wayuunaiki: "friend"
- Named by: Moreno et al.
- Location: Uribia
- Year defined: 2015
- Coordinates: 11°51′4.32″N 71°19′26.4″W
- Region: La Guajira
- Country: Colombia
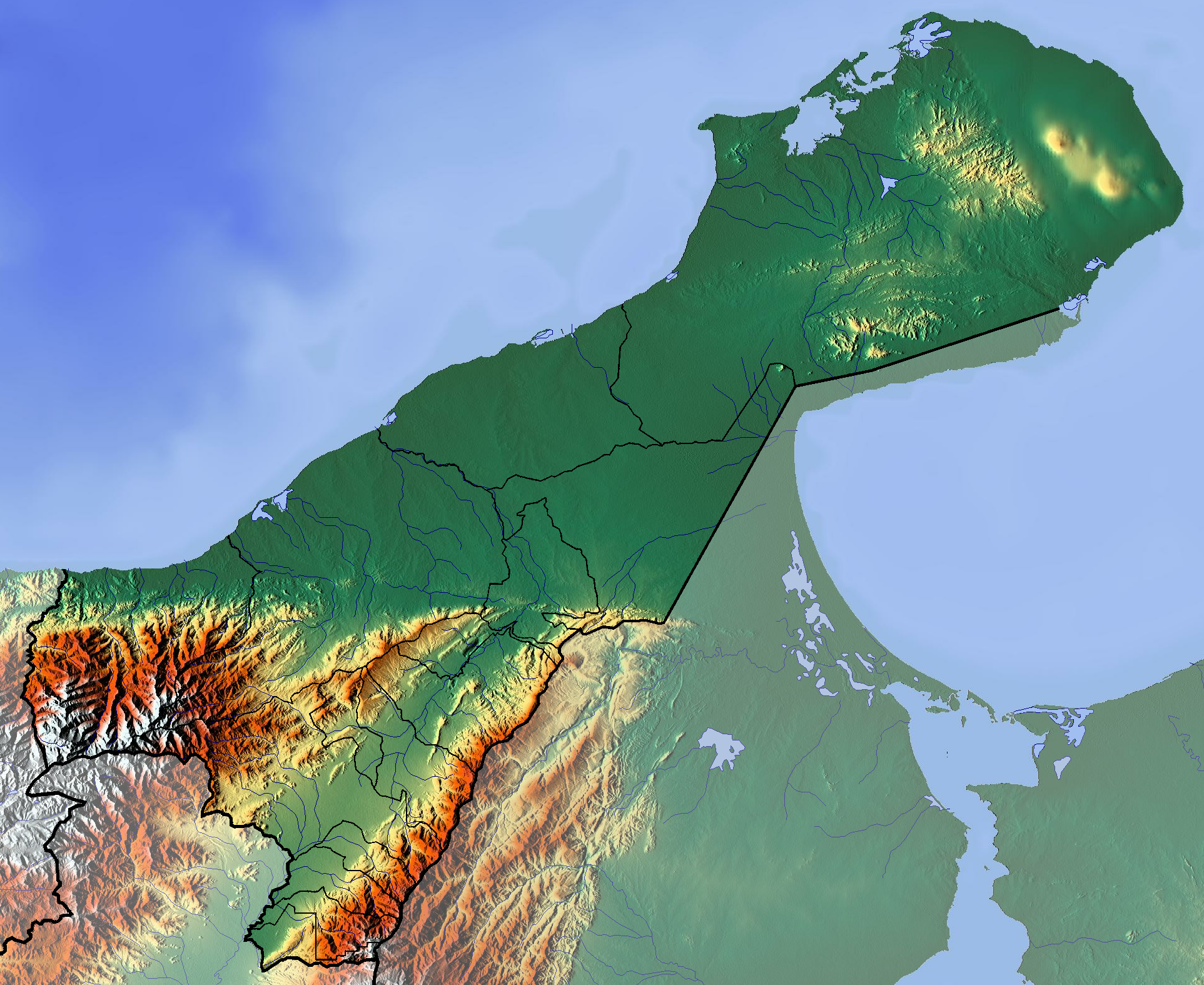
- Type locality of the formation in La Guajira

The Ware Formation (Spanish: Formación Ware) is a fossiliferous geological formation of the Cocinetas Basin in the northernmost department of La Guajira. The formation consists of fine lithic to quartzitic sandstones, mudstones, pebbly conglomerates with sedimentary and metamorphic rock fragments, fossiliferous packstones and sandy to conglomeratic beds with high fossil content. The Ware Formation dates to the Neogene and Quaternary periods; Late Miocene to Early Pleistocene epochs, typically Pliocene (3.5 to 2.8 Ma), Uquian, Chapadmalalan and Montehermosan in the SALMA classification, and has a maximum thickness of 25 metres (82 ft).

== Etymology ==
The formation was defined in 2015 by Moreno et al., and given the name Ware, meaning "friend" in Wayuunaiki, the language of the local indigenous Wayuu, meaning "friend". The name has been given to pay tribute to the friendship between Colombia and Venezuela.

== Description ==
=== Lithologies ===
The Ware Formation consists of fine lithic to quartzitic sandstones, mudstones, pebbly conglomerates with sedimentary and metamorphic rock fragments, fossiliferous packstones and sandy to conglomeratic beds with high fossil content.

=== Stratigraphy and depositional environment ===
The Ware Formation overlies the Castilletes Formation and is overlain by Quaternary alluvium. The age has been estimated to be Late Miocene to Early Pleistocene (5.2 to 1.22 Ma), Uquian, Chapadmalalan and Montehermosan in the SALMA classification, with a narrow definition in the Pliocene (3.5 to 2.8 Ma). The marine invertebrate fauna of the Ware Formation shows a greater similarity with modern assemblages offshore of the Guajira Peninsula than with those of the underlying units. The base of the Ware Formation was deposited in a fluvio-deltaic environment, whereas the marine invertebrate assemblage at the top of the unit contains taxa typical of exposed open-ocean shoreface and nearshore settings, but with proximity to coral reef habitats. The Ware Formation correlates with the San Gregorio Formation in the Venezuelan Falcón Basin.

=== Fossil content ===
Group	Fossils	Notes
Mammals	Camelidae, Glyptodontidae, Pampatheriidae, Proterotheriidae, Toxodontidae, Caviidae, Erethizontidae	
Mammals	Tardigrada gen. et sp. indet.	
Mammals	Mylodontidae gen. et sp. indet.	
Mammals	Lestodontini gen. et sp. nov.	
Mammals	Scelidotheriinae gen. et sp. indet., ?Hyperleptus sp.	
Mammals	Megalonychidae gen. et sp. nov.	
Mammals	Pliomegatherium lelongi	
Mammals	Nothrotherium sp.	
Mammals	Chapalmalania sp.	
Mammals	Hydrochoeropsis wayuu	
Reptiles	Crocodylus sp., Crocodylidae indet., Alligatoridae, Podocnemididae	
Fish	Characidae, Cynodontidae, Serrasalmidae, Cichlidae, Sciaenidae, Doradidae, Pimelodidae, Carcharhinidae, Sphyrnidae, Myliobatidae, Pristidae	
Invertebrates	Argopecten sp., Euvola sp., Nodipecten sp., Crassostrea sp., Plicatula sp., Spondylus sp., Anodontia sp., Codakia sp., Bulla sp., Laevicardium sp., Trachycardium sp., Macrocallista sp.	

== See also ==
Geology of the Eastern Hills
Cesar-Ranchería Basin
Honda Group
Chorrera, Pisco, Tilatá, Tunjuelo Formations
Urumaco
