= Siamaná Formation =

Geologic formation in Colombia

- Stratigraphic range: Mid-Late Oligocene; ~28–23 Ma
- Type: Geological formation
- Unit of: Cocinetas Basin
- Underlies: Uitpa Formation
- Overlies: Macarao Formation
- Thickness: 430 m (1,410 ft)

Lithology
- Primary: Conglomerate
- Other: Limestone

Location
- Coordinates: 11°58′00″N 71°22′43″W
- Region: La Guajira; Caribbean region
- Country: Colombia

Type section
- Named for: Siamaná
- Named by: Renz
- Location: Uribia
- Year defined: 1960
- Coordinates: 11°58′00″N 71°22′43″W
- Region: La Guajira
- Country: Colombia
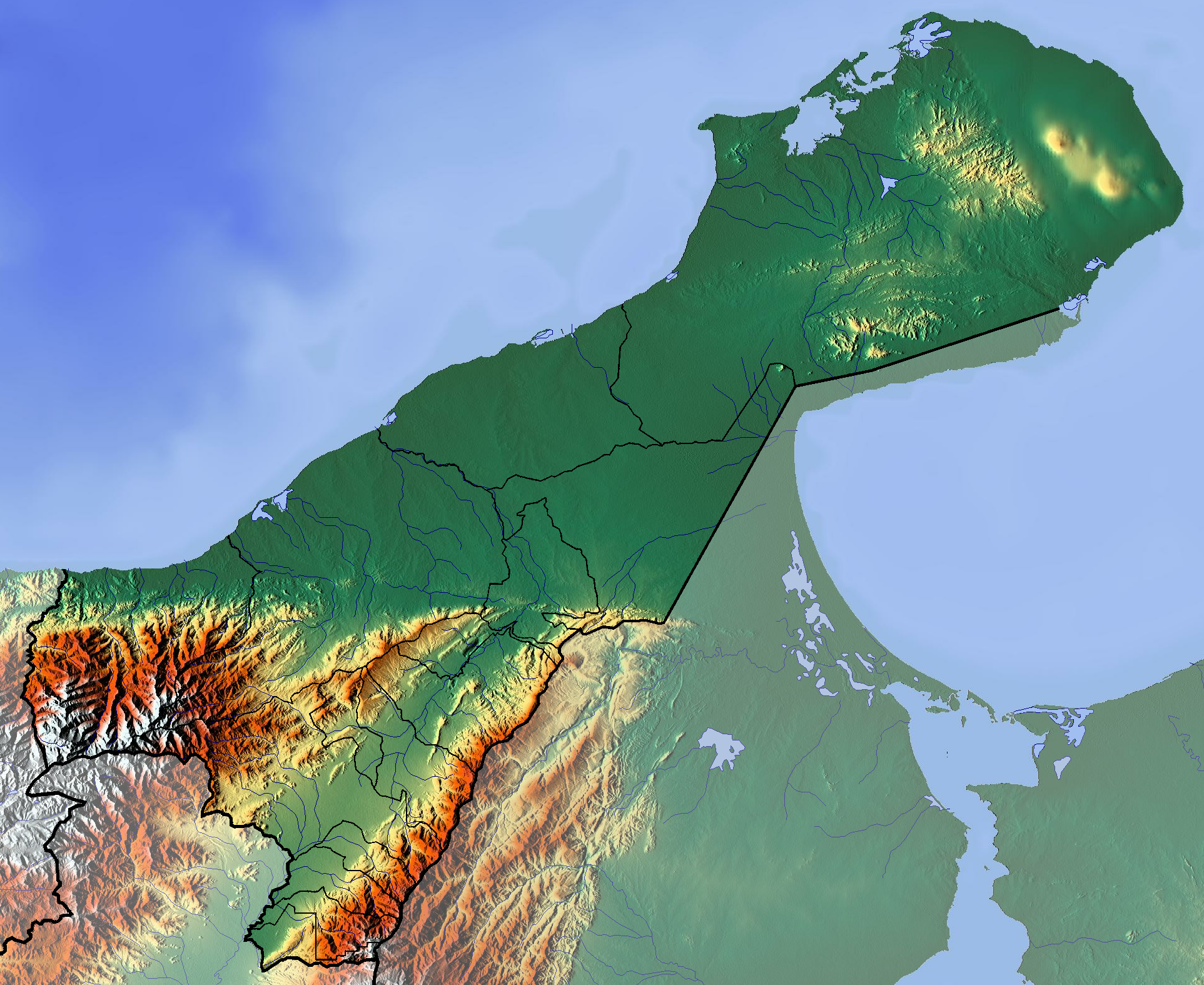
- Type locality of the formation in La Guajira

The Siamaná Formation (Spanish: Formación Siamaná, E3s) is a fossiliferous geological formation of the Cocinetas Basin in the northernmost department of La Guajira. The formation consists of conglomerates and limestones. The Siamaná Formation dates to the Paleogene period; Middle to Late Oligocene epoch, corresponding to the Deseadan in the SALMA classification.

== Etymology ==
The formation was defined by Renz in 1960 and named after the village of Siamaná.

== Description ==
=== Lithologies ===
The Siamaná Formation consists of conglomerates and thick carbonates.

=== Stratigraphy and depositional environment ===
The Siamaná Formation, with a maximum thickness of 430 metres (1,410 ft), overlies the Macarao Formation and is overlain by the Uitpa Formation. The age has been estimated to be Middle to Late Oligocene, corresponding to the Deseadan in the SALMA classification. The depositional environment has been interpreted as shallow marine.

=== Petroleum geology ===
The Siamaná Formation is a reservoir and seal rock formation in the Guajira Basin.

=== Fossil content ===
Group	Fossils	Notes
Invertebrates	Mimachlamys canalis, Ostrea sp.	

== See also ==
Geology of the Eastern Hills
Cesar-Ranchería Basin
Honda Group
Abanico, Castillo, Chota, Loreto, Soncco, Usme Formations
Tinguiririca fauna
