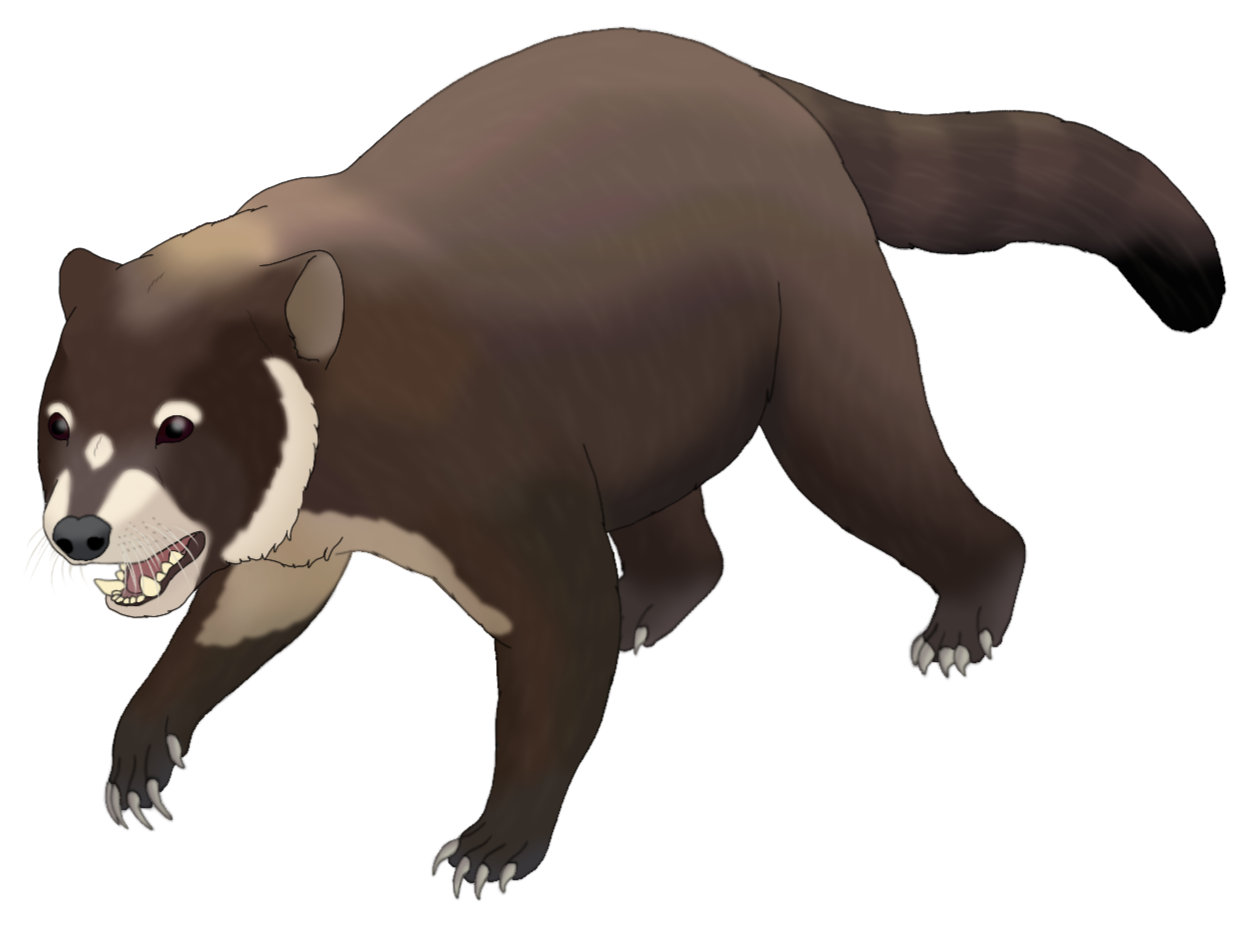

Scientific classification
- Kingdom: Animalia
- Phylum: Chordata
- Class: Mammalia
- Order: Carnivora
- Family: Procyonidae
- Genus: †Chapalmalania; Ameghino, 1908

Species
- C. altaefrontis; C. orthognatha

= Chapalmalania =

Chapalmalania Temporal range: Late Miocene - Early Pliocene to Early Pleistocene (Montehermosan-Uquian) ~6.8–1.8 Ma

Extinct genus of procyonid mammals from South America

Chapalmalania is an extinct genus of procyonid from the Late Miocene or Early Pliocene to Early Pleistocene (Montehermosan to Uquian) of Argentina (Andalhualá Formation), Venezuela (San Gregorio Formation, Venezuela), and Colombia (Ware Formation, Cocinetas Basin, La Guajira).

== Description ==
Originally misidentified as a kind of bear, Chapalmalania is in fact a giant relative of raccoons and coatis, estimated to have weighed between 125 kilograms (276 lb) to 181 kilograms (399 lb), comparable in mass to small/medium sized ursids such as the American black bear (Ursus americanus), sloth bear (Melursus ursinus) and spectacled bear (Tremarctos ornatus).

== Evolution ==
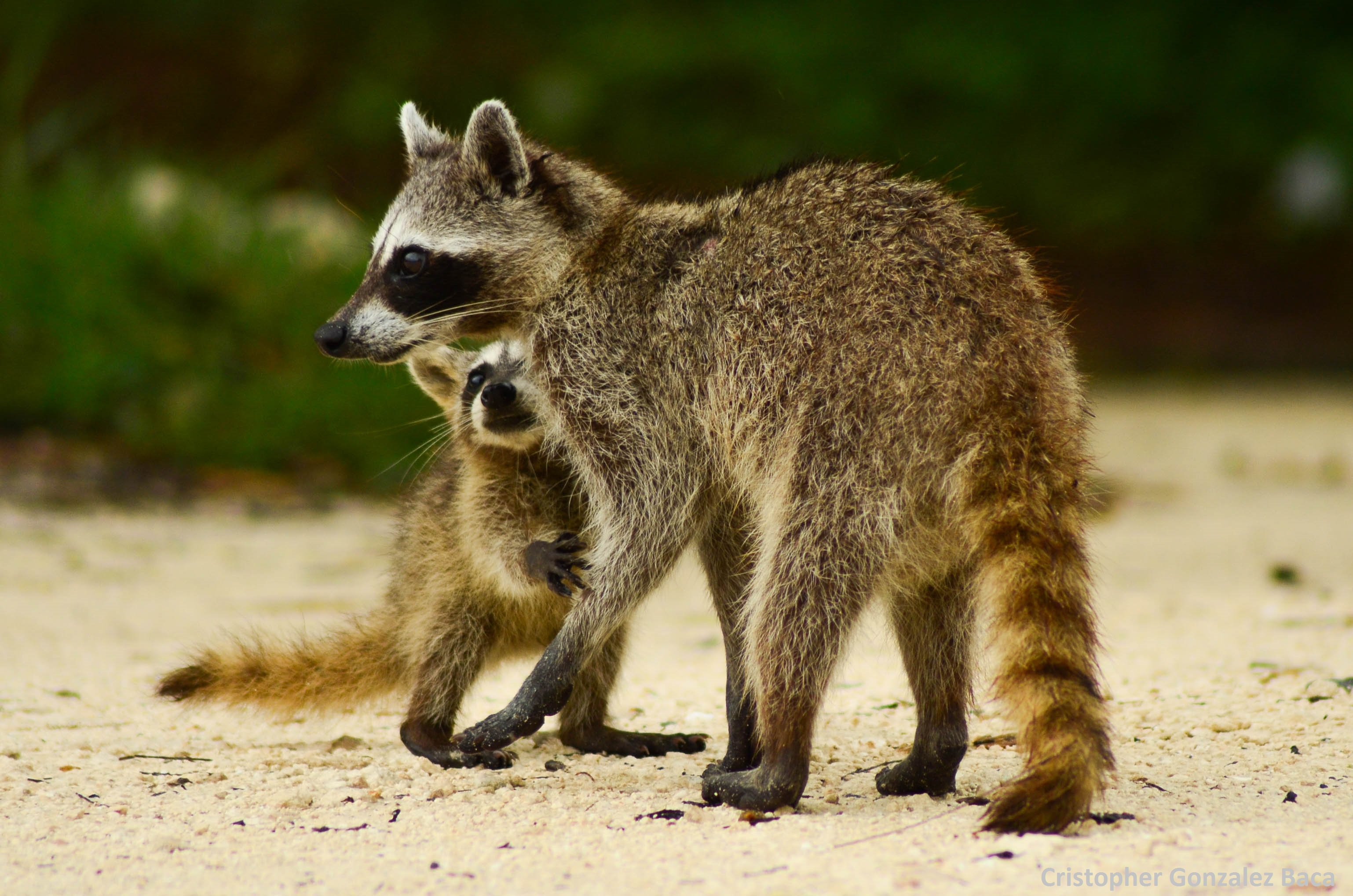
The Cozumel Raccoon, a procyonid that colonized the nearby island of Cozumel in a similar trans-oceanic fashion that the ancestors of Cyonasua and Chapalmalania colonized South America during the Late Miocene

Such a drastic size increase compared to its North America cousins likely stems from a rapid evolutionary response upon arriving in South America, with Chapalmalania evolving from the "dog-coati" Cyonasua, which probably island-hopped from Central America during the late Miocene (7.5 million years ago), making them perhaps the earliest southward mammalian migrants of the Great American Interchange, and one of the few documented cases of trans-oceanic dispersals of carnivorous mammals (the only other major examples being the Eupleridae of Madagascar and the Sulawesi palm civet of Sulawesi). It is thought the reason for this comes down to various aspects of procyonid biology that grant higher success at dispersing across ocean barriers than other carnivores. First, procyonids are excellent climbers, and can cling onto floating rafts of vegetation more effectively than more terrestrial carnivores. Secondly, their omnivorous diet allows them to take advantage of more food options when stranded out to sea, extending their survival and thus increasing their chances of making it to land. Finally, hypo carnivores like procyonids live at higher densities than mesocarnivores or hyper carnivores like mustelids, felids, and canids, thereby naturally increasing their chances at being swept out to sea in the first place due to greater abundance. Three other instances of trans-oceanic dispersal are documented among procyonids that further support these claims in practice, being the Cozumel Island Raccoon, Tres Marias Raccoon, and the Cozumel coati.

It is thought that as the Isthmus of Panama rose from the sea to allow further invasions by other North American species, Chapalmalania was unable to compete and its lineage became extinct, especially with the arrival of Tremarctinae bears which appear to share similar dental morphologies with the large procyonid. However, it is also possible the extinction of Chapalmalania was due to climatic changes that occurred during the Pleistocene that wiped out a number of the continent's native fauna (Such as the large terror birds like Titanis, megafaunal members of Dinomyidae, and various South American native ungulates), with bears filling in the empty niches upon their arrival to the continent during the Late Uquian.

== Paleoecology ==
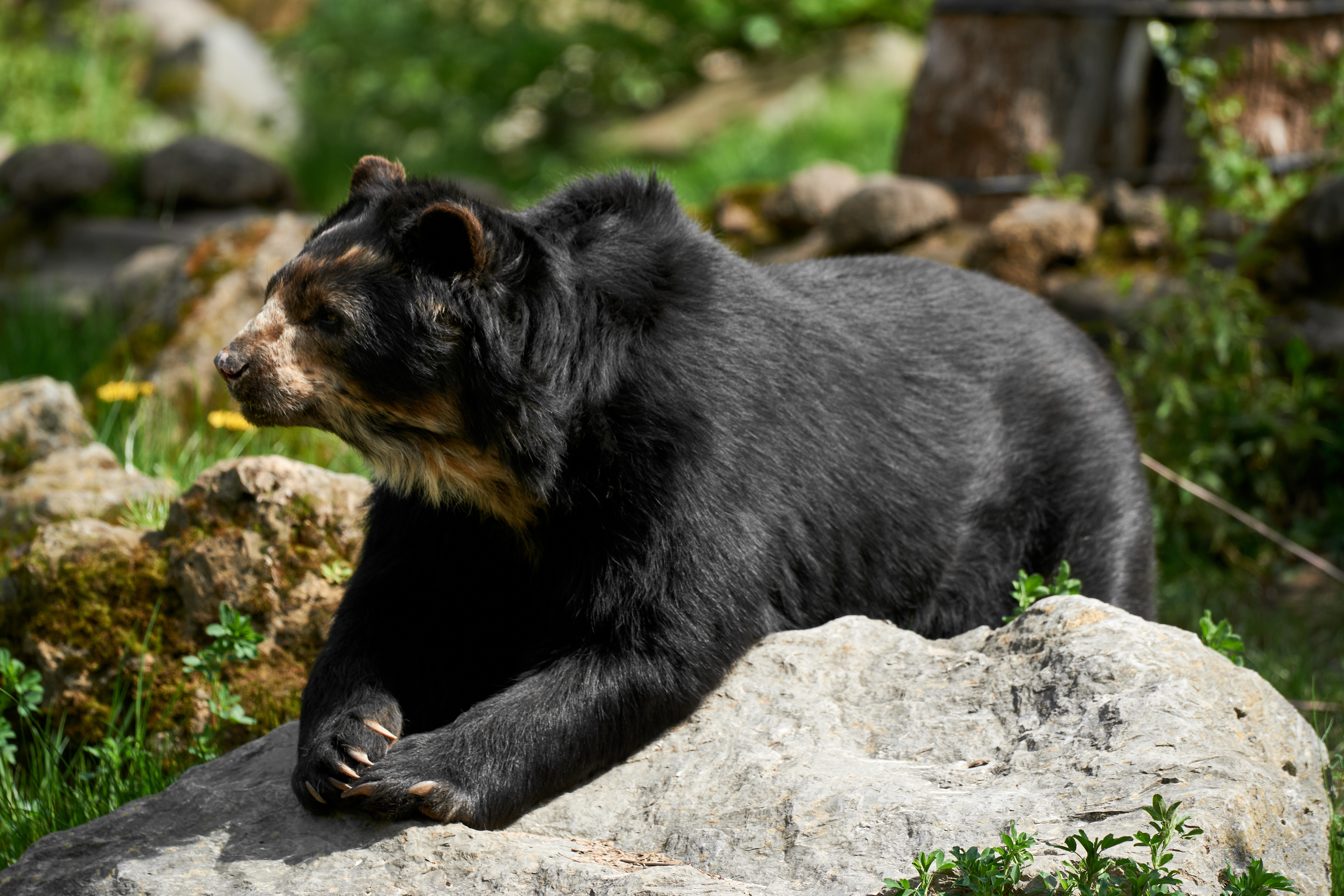
The spectacled bear, a tremarctine ursid that potentially fills a similar niche to the now extinct Chapalmalania.

Chapalmalania and Cyonasua are considered more carnivorous than other procyonids bar the modern-day Bassariscus, being classified as hypocarnivores. It is thought that Chapalmalania would have had an omnivorous diet similar to modern bears based on dental morphology, plotting especially close to the modern day spectacled bear. Being omnivorous would have allowed them to niche-partition with the hypercarnivorous sparassodonts and terror birds that it lived alongside. Bite marks attributable to Chapalmalania have been found on a glyptodont carcass and have been interpreted as scavenging behavior, suggesting that Chapalmalania also fed on carrion of large mammals such as glyptodonts on at least some occasions, the blunt cusps of its molars well designed to grind down tough foods.
