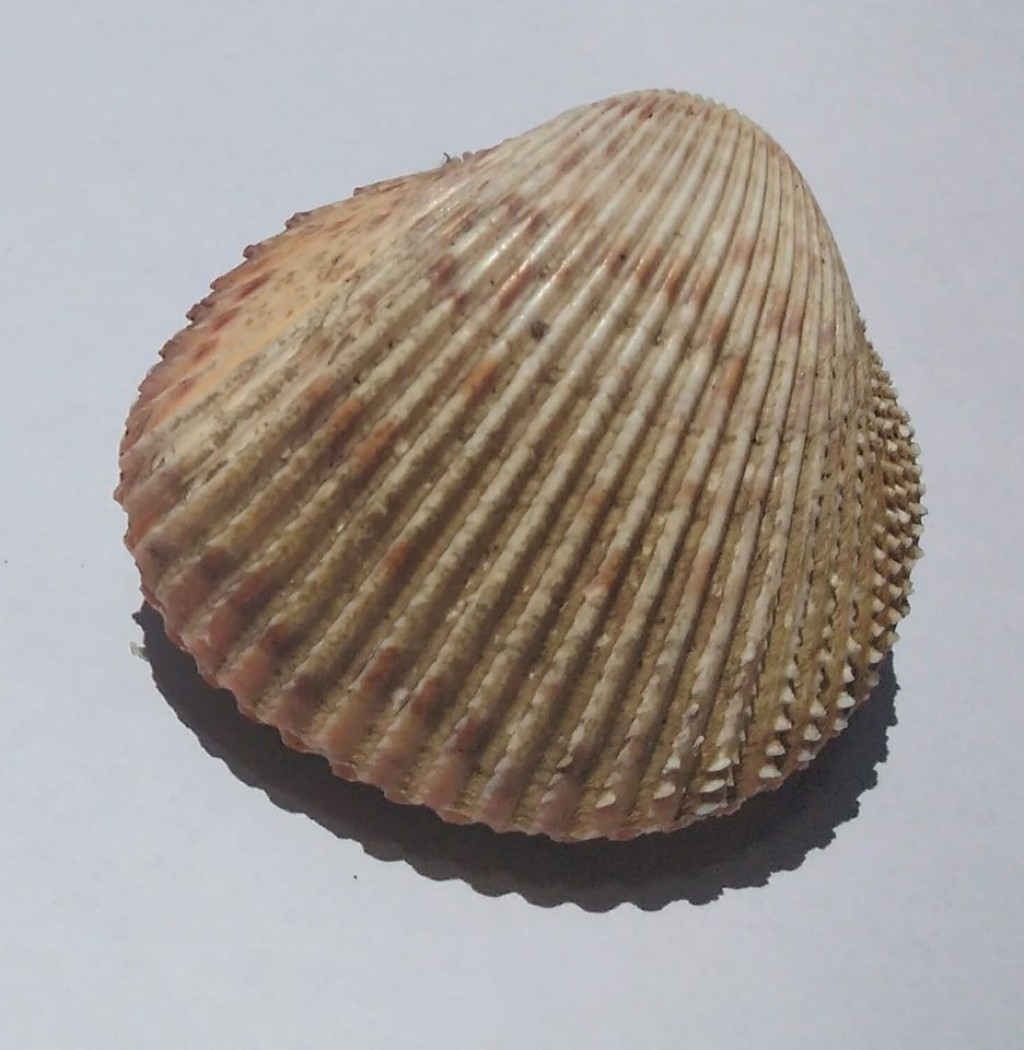

Conservation status
- Secure (NatureServe)

Scientific classification
- Kingdom: Animalia
- Phylum: Mollusca
- Class: Bivalvia
- Order: Cardiida
- Family: Cardiidae
- Genus: Dallocardia
- Species: D. muricata

Binomial name
- Dallocardia muricata (Linnaeus, 1758)

Synonyms
- Cardium campechiense Röding, 1798; Cardium gossei Deshayes, 1855; Cardium lima Reeve, 1845; Cardium muricatum Linnaeus, 1758; Trachycardium lima (Reeve, 1845); Trachycardium muricatum (Linnaeus, 1758)

= Dallocardia muricata =

Species of bivalve

Dallocardia muricata, the yellow prickly cockle, is a species of bivalve mollusc in the family Cardiidae.

== Distribution ==
Atlantic coast of North America, ranging from North Carolina to the West Indies and Brazil.
