= Urumaco =

Town in Venezuela

- Coordinates: 11°12′N 70°15′W

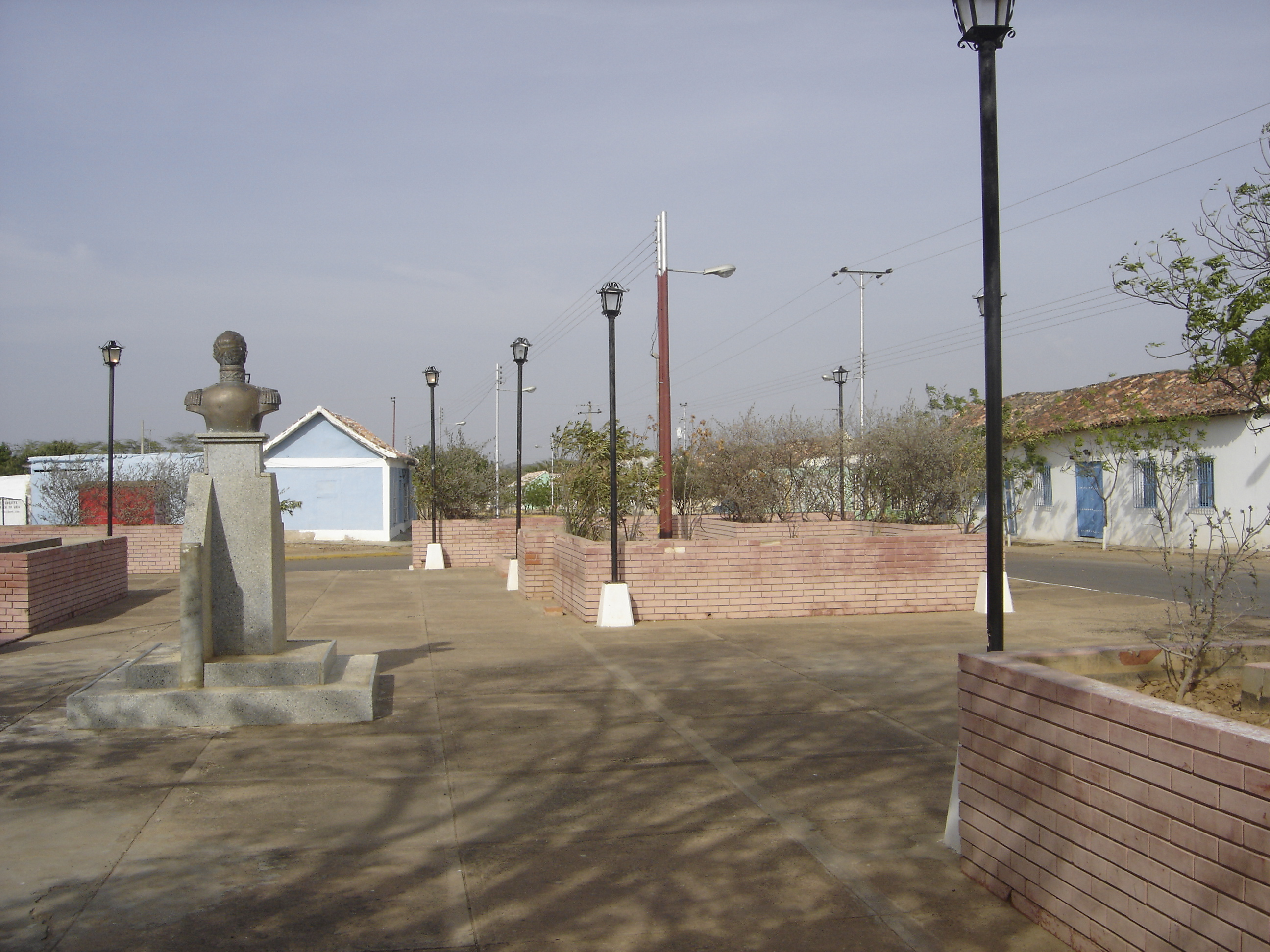
Urumaco.

Urumaco is a town in Falcón State in Venezuela. It is of interest to paleontologists due to its rich fossil history. The arid climate of the region means that the fossils are not hidden by vegetation. The fossils were first made known to science by geologists who came across them while looking for oil, which is abundant in some parts of Venezuela. The paleontological wealth of Urumaco makes it the most fossil-rich zone of northern South America.

Stupendemys geographicus, the largest turtle ever to have existed, was found here in the 1970s by researchers from Harvard University. More recently, publicity has been attracted by discoveries of the giant rodent Phoberomys pattersoni from the Miocene epoch.

Since 2000 there has been a museum in the town, the Museo Paleontológico de Urumaco. There is an Archaeology and Paleontology Park in La Cruz de Taratara, a small town in Sucre near Coro.

== See also ==
- Taima-Taima
- Cocinetas Basin
