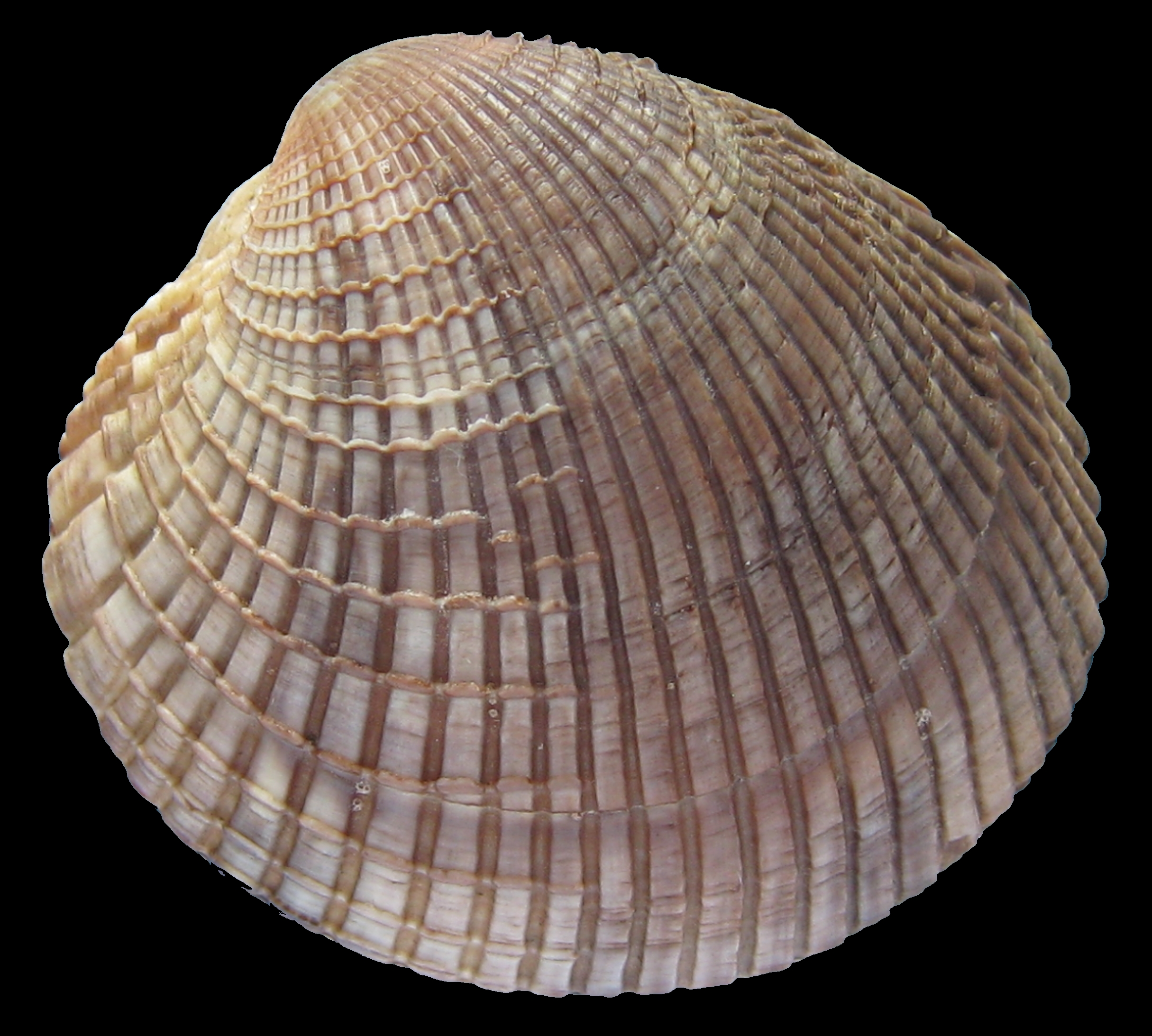
- A shell of Leukoma columbiensis

Scientific classification
- Domain: Eukaryota
- Kingdom: Animalia
- Phylum: Mollusca
- Class: Bivalvia
- Order: Venerida
- Family: Veneridae
- Genus: Leukoma; Römer, 1857

Species
- See text

= Leukoma =

Genus of bivalves

Leukoma is a genus of saltwater clams, marine bivalve molluscs in the family Veneridae, the Venus clams. This genus of bivalves has been exploited by humans since prehistory; for example, the Chumash peoples of California harvested this genus from Morro Bay in approximately 1000 AD.

== Species ==
The following species are recognised in the genus Leukoma:

- Leukoma asperrima (G. B. Sowerby I, 1835)
- Leukoma beili (Olsson, 1961)
- Leukoma columbiensis (G. B. Sowerby I, 1835)
- Leukoma crassicosta (Deshayes, 1835)
- Leukoma decussata (Deshayes, 1853)
- Leukoma ecuadoriana (Olsson, 1961)
- Leukoma euglypta (G. B. Sowerby III, 1914)
- Leukoma granulata (Gmelin, 1791)
- Leukoma grata (Say, 1831)
- Leukoma histrionica (Broderip & G. B. Sowerby I, 1835)
- Leukoma jedoensis (Lischke, 1874)
- Leukoma laciniata (P. P. Carpenter, 1864)
- Leukoma lima (G. B. Sowerby II, 1852)
- Leukoma metodon (Pilsbry & H. N. Lowe, 1932)
- Leukoma pectorina (Lamarck, 1818)
- Leukoma pertincta (Dall, 1902)
- Leukoma restorationensis (Frizzell, 1930)
- Leukoma staminea (Conrad, 1837)
- Leukoma subrostrata (Lamarck, 1818)
- Leukoma sugillata (Reeve, 1863)
- Leukoma thaca (Molina, 1782)
