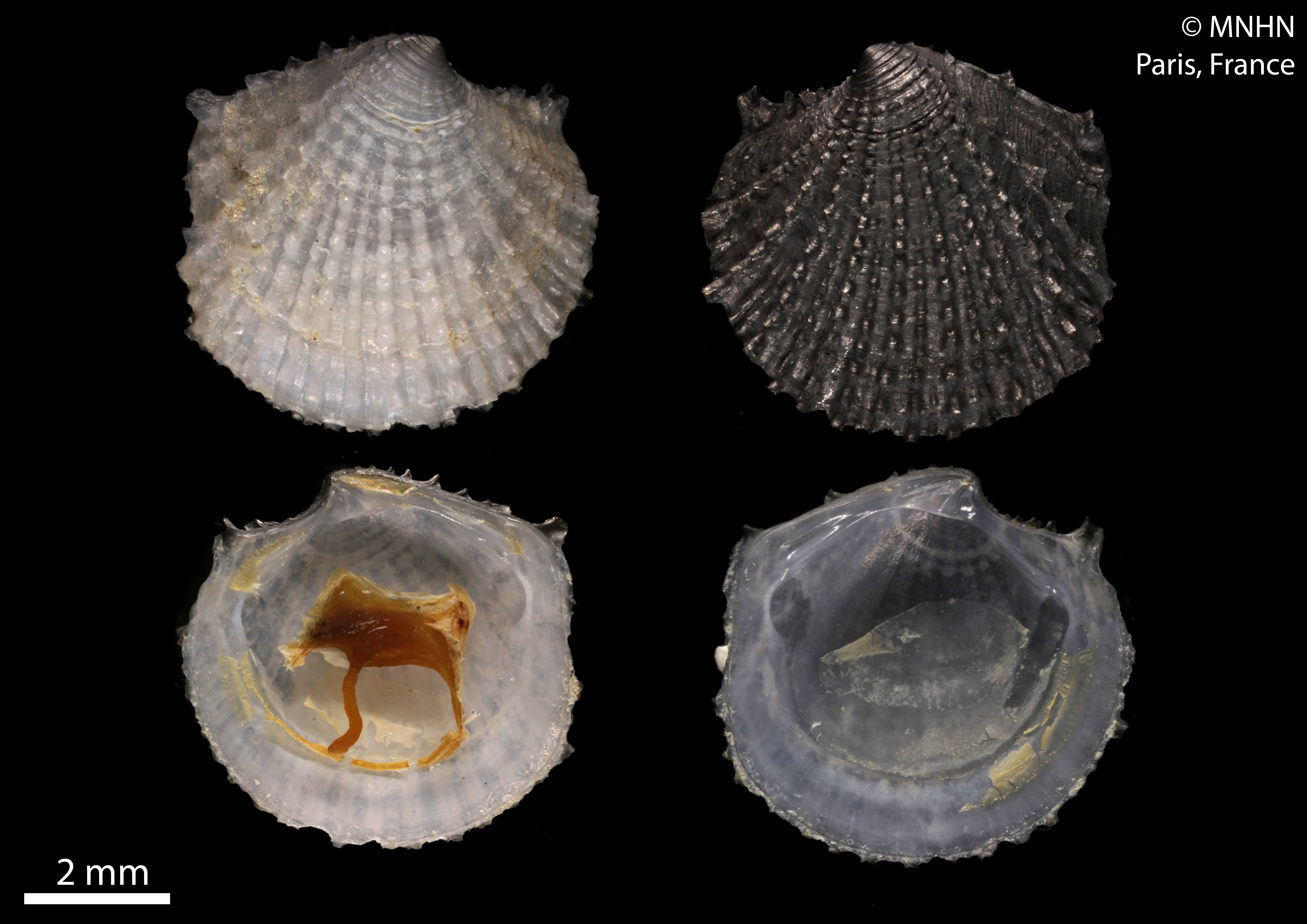
- Shells of Lucinisca muricata (specimens at MNHN, Paris)

Scientific classification
- Domain: Eukaryota
- Kingdom: Animalia
- Phylum: Mollusca
- Class: Bivalvia
- Order: Lucinida
- Family: Lucinidae
- Genus: Lucinisca; Dall, 1901

Type species
- Lucina nassula Conrad, 1846

Species
- See text

Synonyms
- Phacoides (Lucinisca) Dall, 1901 (original rank)

= Lucinisca =

Genus of molluscs

Lucinisca is a genus of saltwater clams, marine bivalve molluscs in the subfamily Lucininae of the family Lucinidae.

== Species ==
- † Lucinisca arrogans Olsson, 1964
- † Lucinisca bocasensis Olsson, 1922
- † Lucinisca calhounensis (Dall, 1903)
- Lucinisca centrifuga (Dall, 1901)
- † Lucinisca cribraria (Say, 1824)
- Lucinisca fenestrata (Hinds, 1845)
- Lucinisca muricata (Spengler, 1798)
- Lucinisca nassula (Conrad, 1846)
- Lucinisca nuttalli (Conrad, 1837)
- † Lucinisca plesiolophus (Dall, 1900)
- †Lucinisca protista Woodring, 1982
- † Lucinisca roigi (Maury, 1925)
- † Lucinisca silicata (Mansfield, 1937)
