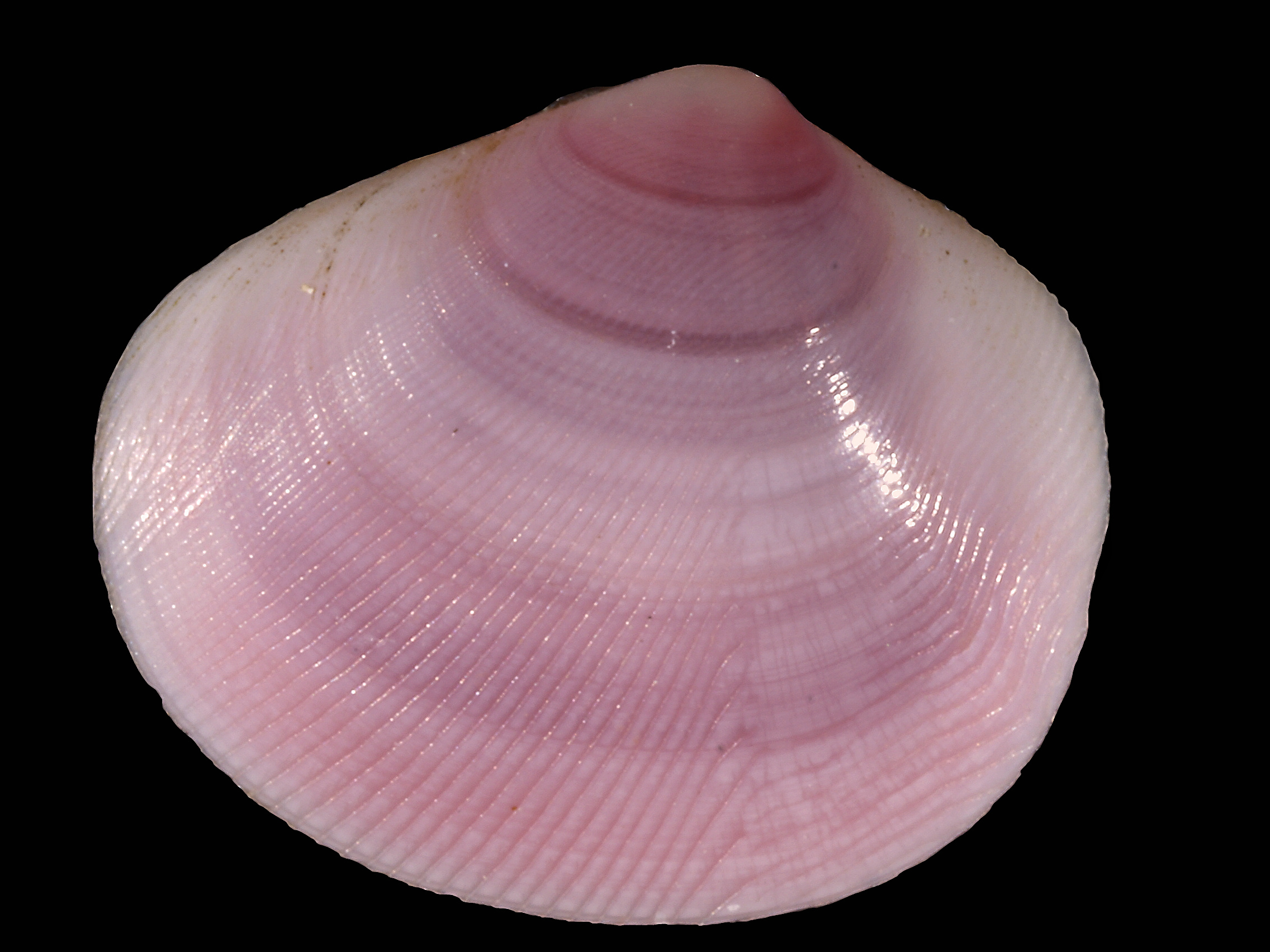
- Strigilla carnaria

Scientific classification
- Domain: Eukaryota
- Kingdom: Animalia
- Phylum: Mollusca
- Class: Bivalvia
- Order: Cardiida
- Family: Tellinidae
- Genus: Strigilla; Turton, 1822

= Strigilla =

Genus of molluscs

Strigilla is a genus of bivalves belonging to the family Tellinidae.

The genus has almost cosmopolitan distribution.

Species:

- Strigilla australis Tate, 1887
- Strigilla carnaria (Linnaeus, 1758)
- Strigilla chroma A.E.Salisbury, 1934
- Strigilla cicercula (Philippi, 1846)
- Strigilla cyrenoidea (Hanley, 1844)
- Strigilla densestriata Preston, 1908
- Strigilla dichotoma (Philippi, 1846)
- Strigilla elegans M.Huber, Langleit & Kreipl, 2015
- Strigilla elegantissima Bertin, 1878
- Strigilla ervilia (Philippi, 1846)
- Strigilla euronia Hedley, 1908
- Strigilla gabbi Olsson & McGinty, 1958
- Strigilla georgiana Gardner, 1947
- Strigilla grasi M.Huber, Langleit & Kreipl, 2015
- Strigilla grossiana Hedley, 1908
- Strigilla interrupta Mörch, 1860
- Strigilla mirabilis (Philippi, 1841)
- Strigilla musanica Olsson, 1922
- Strigilla paraflexuosa Gardner, 1947
- Strigilla pisiformis (Linnaeus, 1758)
- Strigilla producta Tryon, 1870
- Strigilla protera Woodring, 1982
- Strigilla pseudocarnaria Boss, 1969
- Strigilla salisburyi Glibert & van de Poel, 1967
- Strigilla serrata Mörch, 1860
- Strigilla sincera (Hanley, 1844)
- Strigilla sphaerion Gardner, 1947
- Strigilla splendida (Anton, 1838)
- Strigilla surinamensis Boss, 1972
- Strigilla tomlini E.A.Smith, 1915
