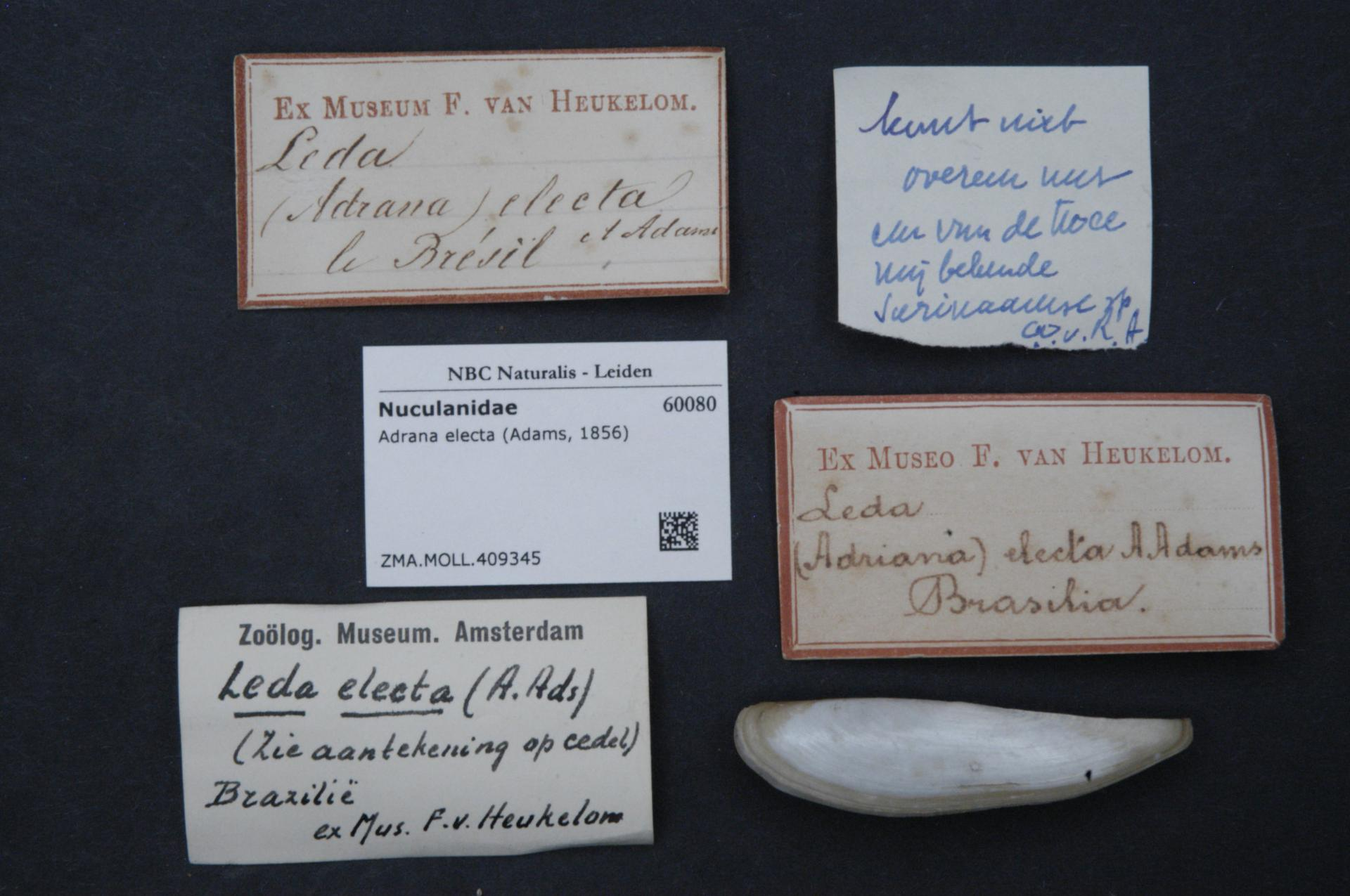
- Adrana electa in the bottom right corner

Scientific classification
- Domain: Eukaryota
- Kingdom: Animalia
- Phylum: Mollusca
- Class: Bivalvia
- Order: Nuculanida
- Family: Nuculanidae
- Genus: Adrana; H.Adams & A.Adams, 1858

= Adrana (bivalve) =

Genus of bivalves

Adrana is a genus of bivalves belonging to the family Nuculanidae.

The species of this genus are found in America.

== Species ==
The Global Biodiversity Information Facility recognizes 12 species.

- Adrana aegra Olsson, 1964
- Adrana crenifera (G.B.Sowerby I, 1833)
- Adrana electa (A.Adams, 1856)
- Adrana gloriosa (A.Adams, 1856)
- Adrana lancea (Thunberg, 1815)
- Adrana ludmillae (Petuch, 1987)
- Adrana metcalfei (Hanley, 1860)
- Adrana patagonica (d'Orbigny, 1845)
- Adrana penascoensis (H.N.Lowe, 1935)
- Adrana sowerbyana (d'Orbigny, 1845)
- Adrana stena Woodring, 1973
- Adrana tellinoides (G.B.Sowerby I, 1823)
