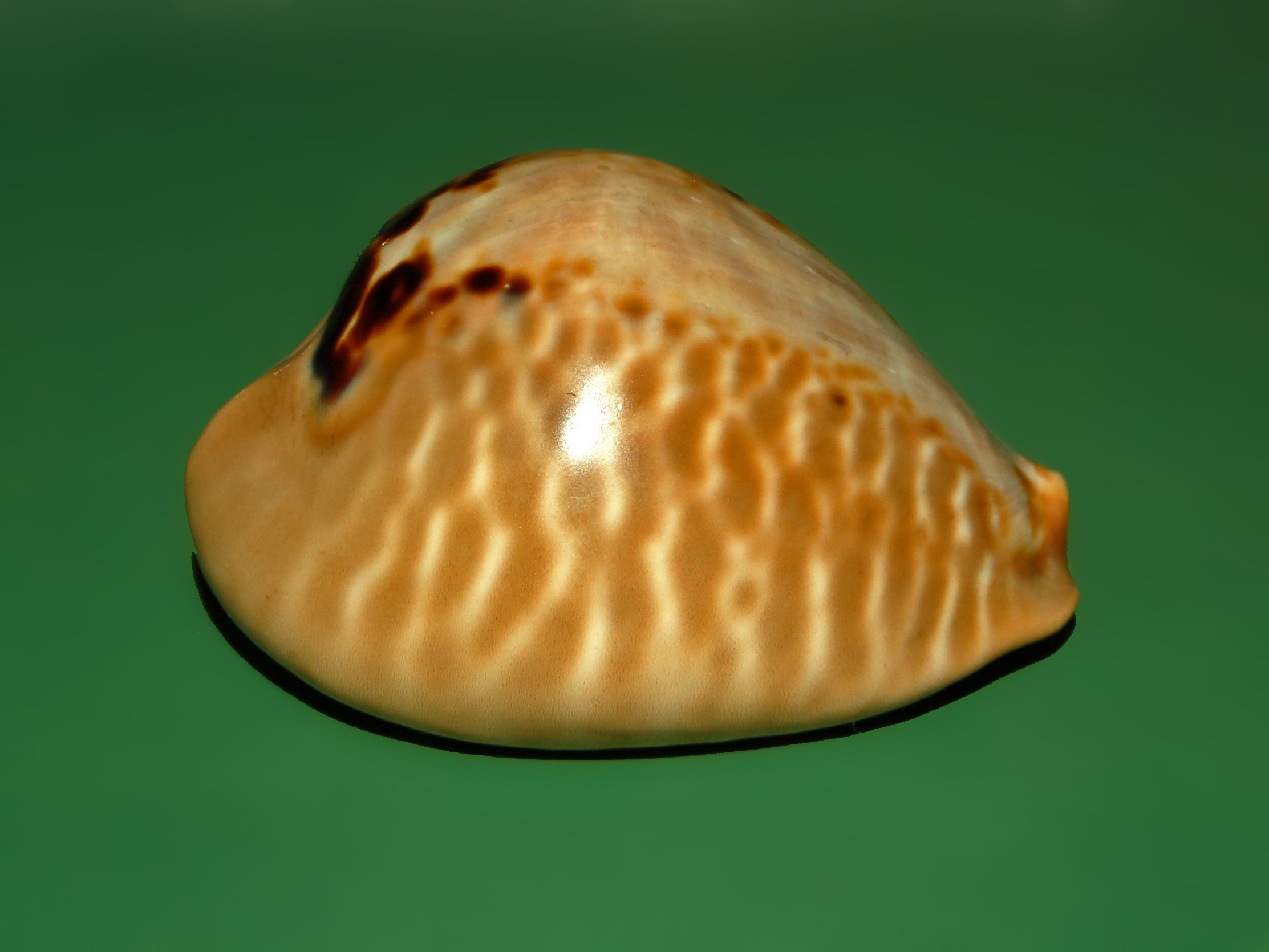
- Muracyprea mus

Scientific classification
- Kingdom: Animalia
- Phylum: Mollusca
- Class: Gastropoda
- Subclass: Caenogastropoda
- Order: Littorinimorpha
- Family: Cypraeidae
- Genus: Muracypraea; Woodring, 1957

= Muracypraea =

Genus of gastropods

Muracypraea is a genus of sea snails, marine gastropod mollusks in the family Cypraeidae, the cowries.

== Species ==
Species within the genus Muracypraea include:

- Muracypraea donmoorei (Petuch, 1979)
- Muracypraea mus (Linnaeus, 1758)
