= Caryocorbula =

Scientific classification
- Domain: Eukaryota
- Kingdom: Animalia
- Phylum: Mollusca
- Class: Bivalvia
- Order: Myida
- Family: Corbulidae
- Genus: Caryocorbula; J. Gardner, 1926

Genus of molluscs

Caryocorbula is a genus of saltwater clams belonging to the Corbulidae family, classified as marine bivalve molluscs.: This genus is often referred to as corbula and serracorbula instead of caryocorbula.

== Species ==
Species in this genus, as listed by the World Registry of Marine Species, include

- Caryocorbula amethystina Olsson, 1961
- Caryocorbula biradiata G. B. Sowerby I, 1833
- Caryocorbula chittyana C. B. Adams, 1852
- Caryocorbula colimensis Coan, 2002
- Caryocorbula contracta Say, 1822
- Caryocorbula ira Dall, 1908
- Caryocorbula lavalleana d'Orbigny, 1853
- Caryocorbula luteola Carpenter, 1864
- Caryocorbula marmorata Hinds, 1843
- Caryocorbula nasuta G. B. Sowerby I, 1833
- Caryocorbula otra Coan, 2002
- Caryocorbula ovulata G. B. Sowerby I, 1833
- Caryocorbula porcella Dall, 1916
- Caryocorbula swiftiana C. B. Adams, 1852
- Caryocorbula caribaea d'Orbigny, 1853
- Caryocorbula cymella Dall, 1881
- Caryocorbula dietziana C. B. Adams, 1852
