= Lamelliconcha =

Scientific classification
- Domain: Eukaryota
- Kingdom: Animalia
- Phylum: Mollusca
- Class: Bivalvia
- Order: Venerida
- Superfamily: Veneroidea
- Family: Veneridae
- Genus: Lamelliconcha; Dall, 1902

Type species
- Cytherea concinna G. B. Sowerby I, 1835

Species
- See text

Synonyms
- Hysteroconcha (Lamelliconcha) Dall, 1902

Genus of bivalves

Lamelliconcha is a genus of molluscs in the subfamily Callocardiinae of the family Veneridae.

== Species ==
- Lamelliconcha alternata (Broderip, 1835)
- Lamelliconcha callicomata (Dall, 1902)
- Lamelliconcha circinata (Born, 1778)
- Lamelliconcha concinna (G. B. Sowerby I, 1835)
- Lamelliconcha paytensis (d'Orbigny, 1845)
- Lamelliconcha tortuosa (Broderip, 1835)
- Lamelliconcha unicolor (G. B. Sowerby I, 1835)
- Lamelliconcha vinacea Olsson, 1961

Synonyms

- Lamelliconcha concinnus (G. B. Sowerby I, 1835): synonym of Lamelliconcha concinns (G. B. Sowerby I, 1835) (wrong gender agreement of specific epithet)
- Lamelliconcha frizzelli (Hertlein & A. M. Strong, 1948): synonym of Callpita frizzelli (Hertlein & A. M. Strong, 1948)
- † Lamelliconcha kawadai Aoki, 1954: synonym of † Pliocardia kawadai (Aoki, 1954) (original combination)
