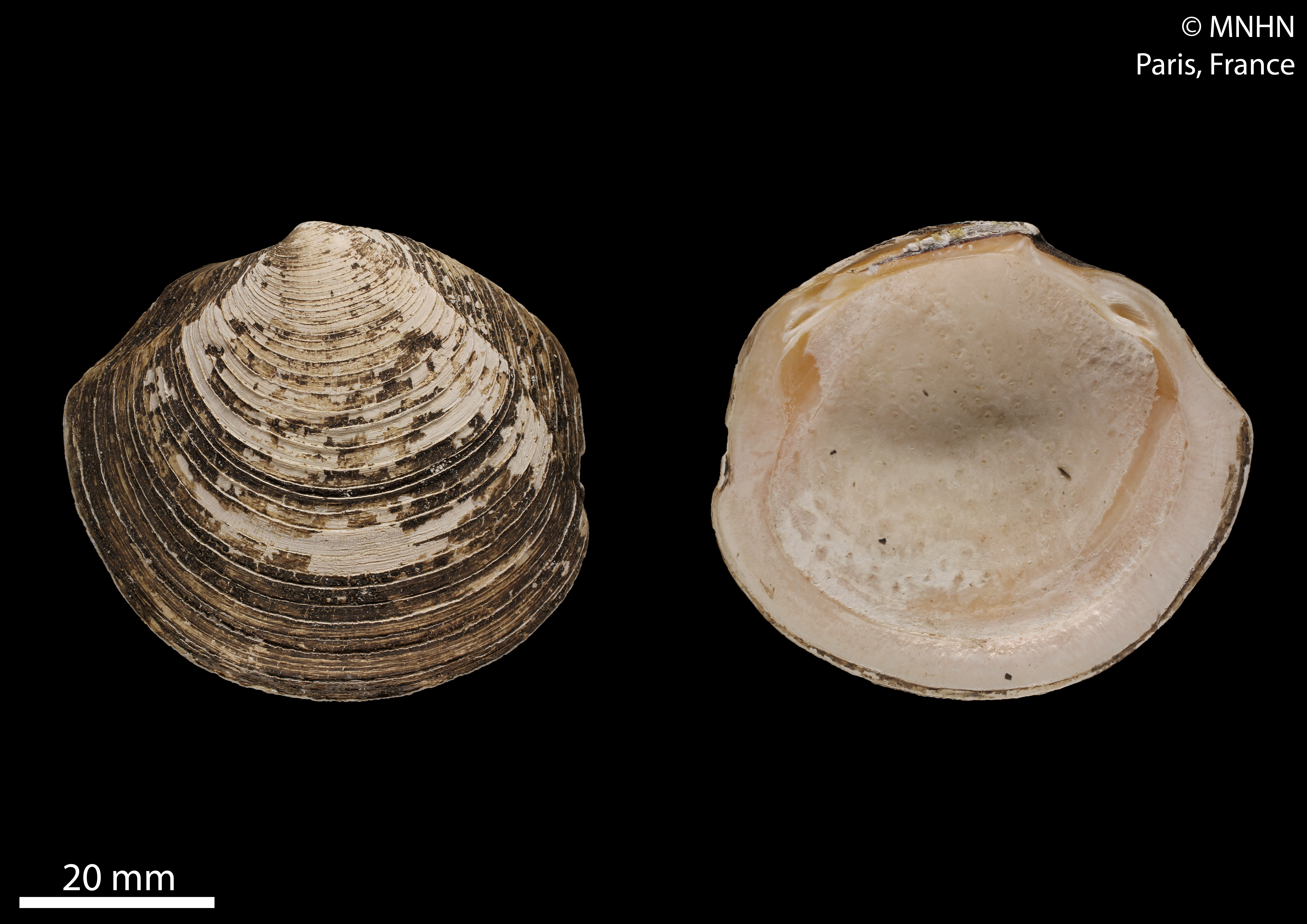
- Shell of Phacoides pectinatus (specimen at MNHN, Paris)

Scientific classification
- Domain: Eukaryota
- Kingdom: Animalia
- Phylum: Mollusca
- Class: Bivalvia
- Order: Lucinida
- Superfamily: Lucinoidea
- Family: Lucinidae
- Genus: Phacoides; Agassiz, 1846

Type species
- Lucina jamaicensis Lamarck, 1801

Synonyms
- Dentilucina P. Fischer, 1887 (objective synonym); Dentilucina (Dentilucina) P. Fischer, 1887; Lucina (Dentilucina) P. Fischer, 1887; Lucina (Phacoides) Agassiz, 1846

= Phacoides =

Genus of bivalves

Phacoides is a genus of bivalves belonging to the family Lucinidae.

The genus has cosmopolitan distribution.

== Species ==
- Phacoides albella Lamarck, 1806
- Phacoides cancellatus Nowell-Usticke, 1969: synonym of Codakia cubana Dall, 1901: synonym of Ferrocina cubana (Dall, 1901) (nomen dubium)
- Phacoides inornata Deshayes, 1857
- † Phacoides lepis (von Koenen, 1885)
- Phacoides pectinatus (Gmelin, 1791)
