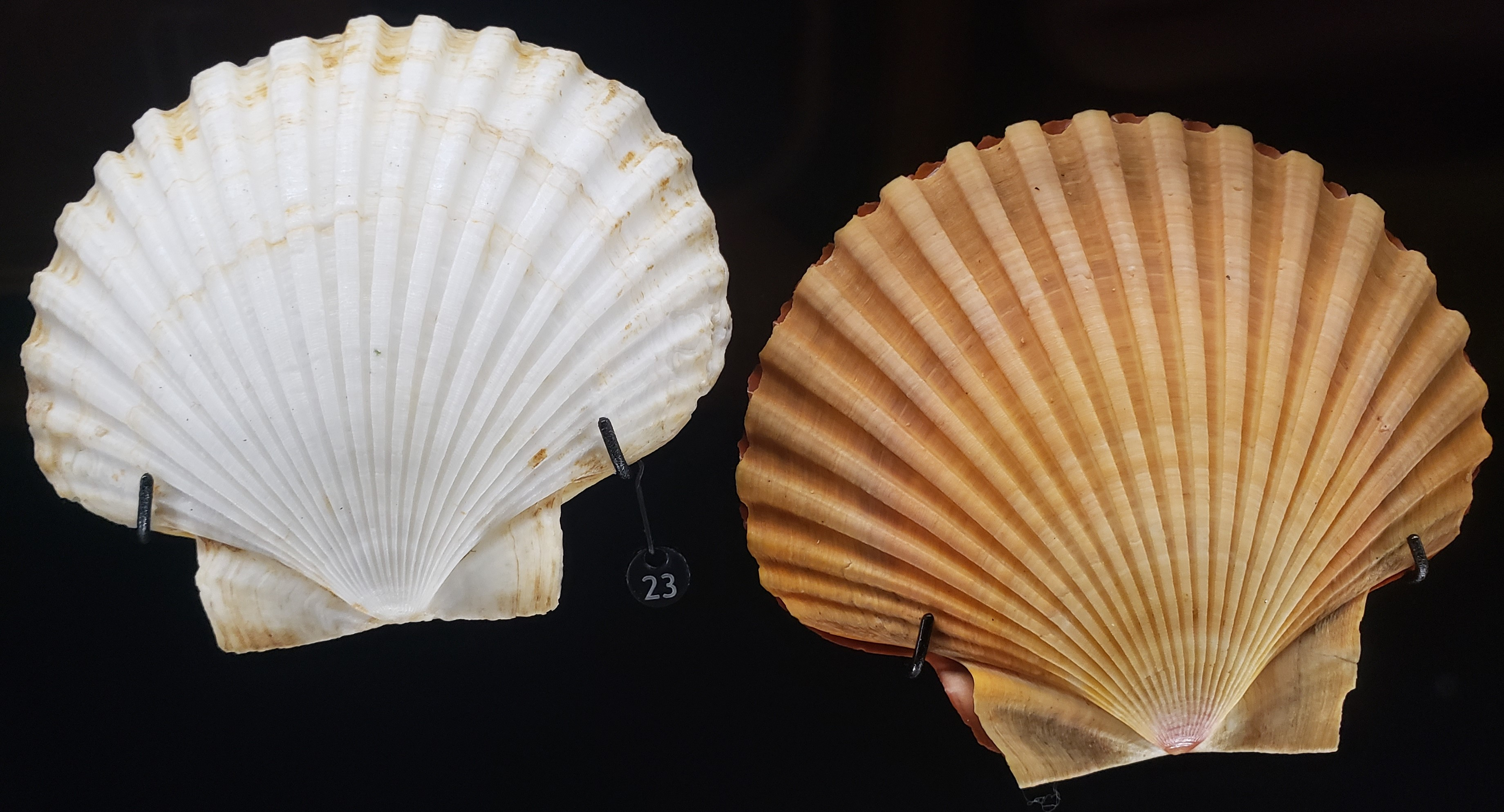
- Leopecten diegensis

Scientific classification
- Domain: Eukaryota
- Kingdom: Animalia
- Phylum: Mollusca
- Class: Bivalvia
- Order: Pectinida
- Family: Pectinidae
- Genus: Leopecten; Masuda, 1971

= Leopecten =

Genus of bivalves

Leopecten is a genus of bivalves belonging to the family Pectinidae.

The genus has almost cosmopolitan distribution.

Species:

- Leopecten cocosensis T.R.Waller, 2007
- Leopecten diegensis (Dall, 1898)
- Leopecten isabelensis T.R.Waller, 2007
- Leopecten sericeus (Hinds, 1845)
- Leopecten stillmani (Dijkstra, 1998)
