= Cyclinella =

Scientific classification
- Domain: Eukaryota
- Kingdom: Animalia
- Phylum: Mollusca
- Class: Bivalvia
- Order: Venerida
- Family: Veneridae
- Genus: Cyclinella; Dall, 1902

Genus of bivalves

Cyclinella is a genus of bivalves belonging to the family Veneridae.

The species of this genus are found in Japan and America.

Species:

- Cyclinella beteyensis Olsson, 1922
- Cyclinella falconensis Hodson et al., 1927
- Cyclinella harrisi Palmer, 1927
- Cyclinella jadisi Olsson, 1961
- Cyclinella producta (Carpenter, 1856)
- Cyclinella subquadrata (Hanley, 1844)
- Cyclinella tenuis (Récluz, 1852)
