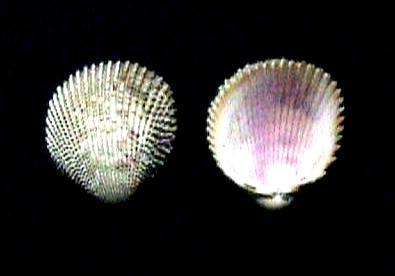
- Dallocardia muricata

Scientific classification
- Kingdom: Animalia
- Phylum: Mollusca
- Class: Bivalvia
- Order: Cardiida
- Family: Cardiidae
- Subfamily: Trachycardiinae
- Genus: Dallocardia; R. B. Stewart, 1930

Type species
- Dallocardia quadragenaria (Conrad, 1837) (originally Cardium quadragenarium)

Other species
- †Dallocardia baiterum (Woodring, 1982); †Dallocardia bowdenensis (Dall, 1900); Dallocardia delicatula (E. A. Smith, 1915); †Dallocardia dominicensis (Gabb, 1873); Dallocardia muricata (Linnaeus, 1758); †Dallocardia phlyctaena (Dall, 1900); Dallocardia radula (Broderip & Sowerby I, 1829)

Synonyms
- Trachycardium (Dallocardia) R. B. Stewart, 1930

= Dallocardia =

Dallocardia Temporal range: Late Eocene–present

Genus of bivalves

Dallocardia is a genus of cockles in the subfamily Trachycardiinae. It was originally described as a subgenus of Trachycardium, but was moved to its own genus in 2012.
