= DSDP 367 =

Deep-sea drilling area near Cape Verde

Coordinates: 12°29′2″N 20°2′8″W

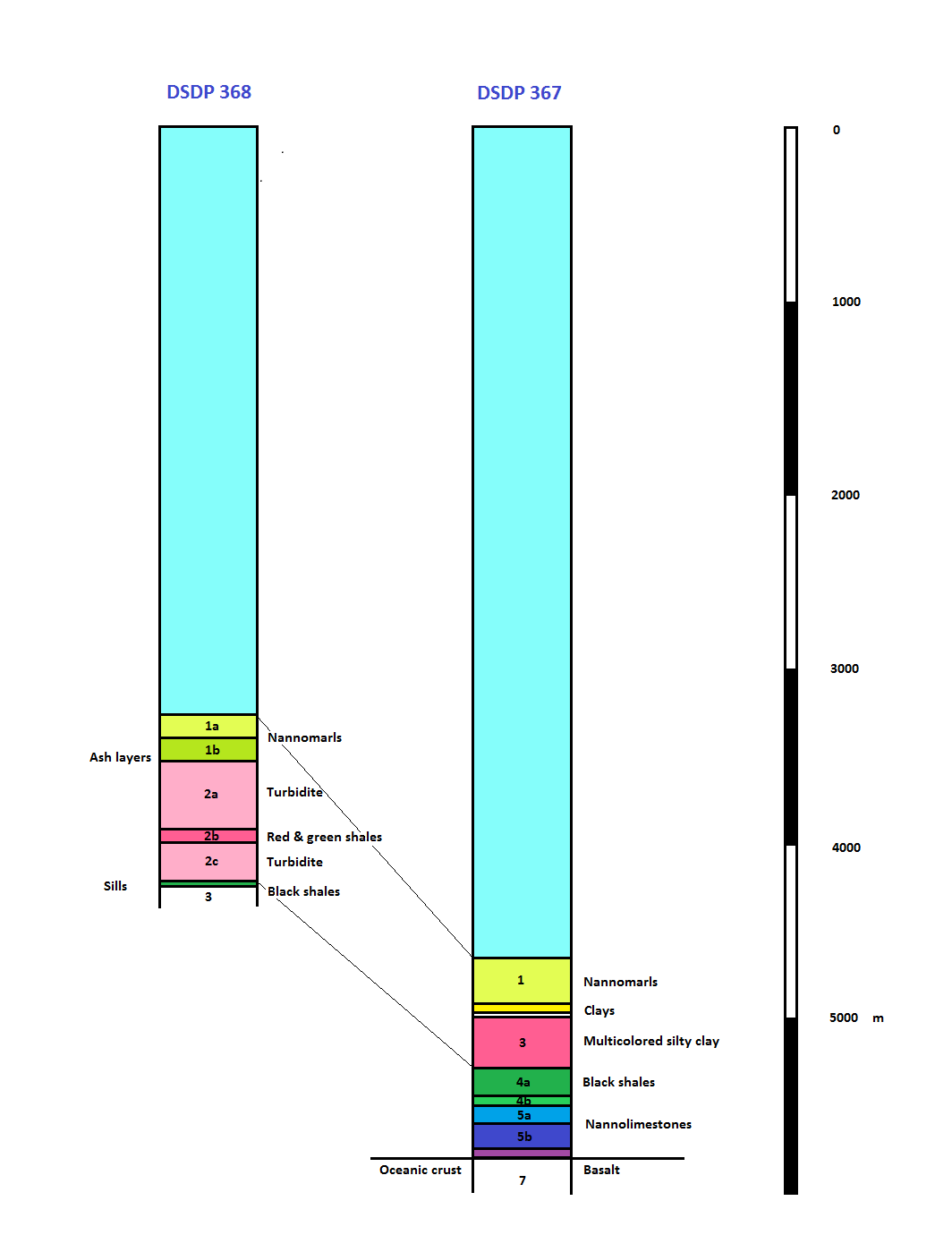
DSDP profiles of 367 and 368

The DSDP 367 was an area that was drilled as part of the Deep Sea Drilling Project that took place below the Cape Verde Basin.

== Location ==
The area was drilled from February 22 to March 1, 1975 by the ship Glomar Challenger before DSDP 368 was drilled. Its location was at 12°29.2'N and, 20°02.8'W and is located 370 km southwest of Dakar and 460 km southeast of Praia, Cape Verde and south of the Cape Verde Rise. The seabed is 4,768 meters deep. The drilling carried a total of 984.5 meters of sediment.

== Stratigraphy ==
At the ocean floor and below consists of several layers including nanomarls (1), clays (2), multicolored silty clay (3), that level located 5,000 meters deep, below are black shales (4a and 4b) and nano-limestones (5a and 5b). Below is the oceanic crust composing basalt (7) just below around 5,800 metres deep.

The top part were formed during the Pleistocene and Miocene age, the second unit were formed during the Late Eocene age, the b subunit were also formed during the Late Paleocene age. The lower units were formed during the Valangian, Oxfordian and Kimmeridgian ages.

== Fossil content ==
Not including benthic and planktonic (or planktonic) materials. There are types of nannoplanktins as well as sponge needles.

=== Foraminifers ===
Planktonic foraminifers are found at around 200 meters below the ocean floor, they include:

- N 22 – Pleistocene: Globorotalia tumida flexuosa.
- N 19 and N 18 – Pliocene (Zanclean): Globigerina rubescens, Globigerinoides conglobatus, Globorotalia crassaformis, Globorotalia digita, Globorotalia exilis, Globorotalia margaritae, Globorotalia miocenica, Globorotalia multicamerata, Globorotalia tosaensis, Globorotalia tumida and Sphaeroidinella dehiscens.
- N 12 – Mid to Late Miocene (Messinian/Tortonian): Cassigerinella chipolensis, Globigerina angustiumbilicata and Globigerinoides trilobus.
- P 21 – Oligocene: Globigerina ciperoensis, Globigerina ouachitaensis and Globigerina praebulloides.
- P 14 – Early to Mid Eocene: Acarinina sp. and Globorotalia subbotinae.
- Upper Cretaceous: Gyroidina, Hedbergella amabilis, Hedbergella infracretacea, Hedbergella planispira, Heterohelix and Loeblichella.
- Cenomanian: Globigerinelloides caseyi, Guembelitria harrisi, Hedbergella amabilis, Hedbergella brittonensis, Hedbergella delrioensis, Hedbergella globigerinelloides, Hedbergella infracretacea, Hedbergella trochoidea, Heterohelix moremani, Praeglobotruncana and Schackoina cenomana.
- Albian: Clavihedbergella simplex, Globigerinelloides, Hedbergella amabilis, Hedbergella delrioensis, Hedbergella infracretacea, Hedbergella planispira, Hedbergella simplicissima and Ticinella primula.
- Early Aptian to Barremian: Globigerinelloides, Gubkinella, Hedbergella globigerinelloides, Hedbergella graysonensis, Hedbergella infracretacea and Hedbergella kugleri.
- Lower Cretaceous: Dorothia praehauteriviana.
- Late Jurassic period: Lenticulina, Nodosaria, Rhabdammina, Spirillina and Spirophthalmidium.

=== Coccoliths ===
Coccoliths are founded up to 250 meters below the ocean floor, the drilling area, they include:

- NN 21 and NN 20 – Holocene and Pleistocene: Emiliana huxleyi, Gephyrocapsa oceanica.
- NN 19 – Pleistocene: Pseudomiliania lacunosa.
- NN 18 and NN 13– Pleocene: Discoaster pentaradiatus, Discoaster surculusaund Discoaster tamalis.
- NP 12 –Early Eocene: Coccolithus crassus and Discoaster lodoensis.
- Late Cretaceous: Tetralithus obscurus
- CC 9 – Cenomanian and Late Albian: Chiastozygus amphipons, Corollithion signum, Eiffellithus turriseiffelii, Lithastrinus floralis, Tetralithus obscurus and Vagalapilla matalosa.
- CC 8 and CC 7 - Early Albian and Late Aptian: Lithastrinus floralis and Parhabdolithus angustus.
- CC 6 – Barremian: Nannoconus colomii.
- CC 3 and CC 4 - Hauterivian und Valanginian:Cruciellipsis cuvillieri and Diadorhombus rectus.
- CC 1 – Berriasian: Cruciellipsis cuvillieri, Lithraphidites carniolensis and Nannoconus colomii.
- NJ 17 – Tithonian: Parhabdolithus embergeri.
- NJ 15 a and NJ 15 b – Kimmeridgian and Oxfordian: Callolithus martelae and Cyclagelosphaera margareli.

=== Radiolaria ===
Several radiolaria were made during the Late Pleistocene, Early Miocene and Early Eocene periods:

- Late Pleistocene: Axoprunum angelinum, Lamprocyclas maritalis, Ommatartus tetrathalamus, Pterocanium trilobum and Siphocampe corbula.
- Late Eocene: Thyrsocyrtis bromia area.
- Mid to Late Eocene: Theocampe cryptocephala cryptocephala area and Theocampe mongolifieri rea.
- Early Eocene:Buryella clinata area und Phormocyrtis striata striata area.
- Early Eocene/Late Pleistocene: Bekoma bidartensis area - Buryella tetradica, Lithocyclia archaea, Lophocyrtis biaurita, Phormocyrtis turgida, Stylosphaera coronate sabaca and Thecosphaerella rotunda.
- Albian/Aptian: Lithocampe elegantissima.
- Early Cretaceous: Sphaerostylus lanceola.
- Berriasian: Sethocapsa trachyostraca-Zone: Sethocapsa cetia and Sethocapsa trachyostraca.

== Geological development ==
Unlike DSDP 368 which is located 550 km north in the Cape Verde Basin, the Upper Jurassic and the Lower Cretaceous sediments below the black shale of the oceanic crust are founded.
