= Globigerinana =

Globigerinana Temporal range: Jurassic - Recent

Scientific classification
- Domain: Eukaryota
- Clade: Sar
- Clade: Rhizaria
- Phylum: Retaria
- Subphylum: Foraminifera
- Class: Rotaliata
- Subclass: Globigerinana; Mikhalevich, 1980

Orders
- Globigerinida; Globorotaliida; Hantkeninida; Heterohelicida

Group of protists

Globigerinana are free living pelagic foraminiferan, included in the class Rotaliata that range from the Jurassic to recent. Test are commonly planospiral or trochospiral but may be uniserial to multiserial and are of secreted hyaline (glassy) calcite. Chambers are flattened in planospiral forms and spheroidal in trochospiral and serial forms. Some have long radial spines, or needles that may be solidly fixed or moveable in sockets. Gametes are biflagellate and are produced in greater number than by bottom dwelling benthic forms.

By comparison, the suborder Globigerinina Delage & Hérouard, 1896, foraminiferal order Rotaliida, are placed instead in the Kingdom Chromista with Rhizaria an infrakingdom Seven superfamilies are included, the Globigerinoidea, Globorotalioidea, Globotruncanoidea, Hantkeninoidea, Heterhelicoidea, Planomalinoidea, and Rotaliporoidea.

Superfamilies with living members are the Heterohelicacea, Globorotaliacea, and Globigerinacea. The Heterohelicacea have chambers that are typically biserial or triserial throughout. Those in the Globorotaliacea are typically trochospiral and smooth while those in the Globigerinacea are trochospiral to planispiral in arrangement and spinose.

Loeblich and Tappan, 1964, place globigerinids (Globigerinacea) in the Rotaliina, wherein Foraminifera is regarded as an order of protists. Fossil families are Heterohelicidae, Planomalinidae, Schachoididae, Rotaliporidae and Globotruncanidae. Extant (living) families include the Hantkeninidae, Globorotaliidae, and Globigeninidae, which compare with the superfamilies in Sen Gupta, 2002.
