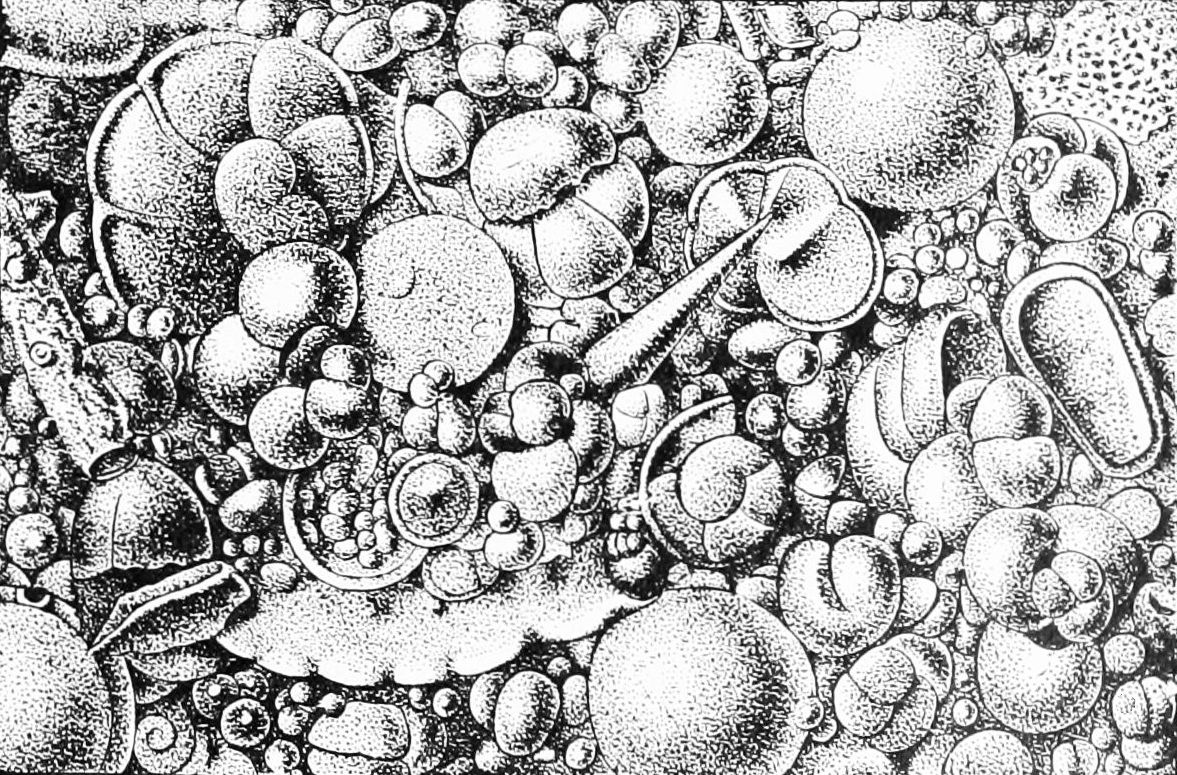
- Illustration of Globigerina ooze

Scientific classification
- Domain: Eukaryota
- Supergroup: Rhizaria
- Phylum: Foraminifera
- Class: Globothalamea
- Order: Rotaliida
- Suborder: Globigerinina
- Superfamily: Globigerinoidea
- Family: Globigerinidae
- Subfamily: Globigerininae
- Genus: Globigerina d'Orbigny, 1826

= Globigerina =

Globigerina Temporal range: Middle Jurassic - Recent.

Genus of single-celled organisms

Globigerina (/ɡloʊˌbɪdʒəˈraɪnə/) is a genus of planktonic Foraminifera, in the order of Rotaliida. It has populated the world's oceans since the Middle Jurassic.

== Globigerina ooze ==
Vast areas of the ocean floor are covered with Globigerina ooze, dominated by the foraminiferous shells of Globigerina and other Globigerinina. The name was originally applied to mud collected from the bottom of the Atlantic Ocean when planning the location of the first transatlantic telegraph cables and it was mainly composed of the shells of Globigerina bulloides.

== Description ==
Globigerina is a marine microorganism characterized by its spherical, coiled shell known as a test. The test is composed of chambers that are not elongated radially but are rounded and trochospiral. As the organism grows, these chambers enlarge rapidly, typically reaching three to five chambers in the final whorl.

The test of Globigerina is constructed from calcareous material and contains pores in a cylindrical pattern, allowing for the exchange of substances. While the organism is alive, the test surface is adorned with numerous slender spines. However, upon death or fossilization, these spines break, leaving behind short, blunt remnants that create a rough texture on the surface, referred to as a hispid appearance.

The aperture, or opening, of the test is located at the top and takes the form of a high umbilical arch. This aperture may be accompanied by an imperforate rim or a narrow lip around its edges. Notably, there are no secondary apertures present in the test structure.

== Species ==
Globigerina includes the following species (extinct species marked with a dagger, †)

- Globigerina bulloides d'Orbigny, 1826
- Globigerina compacta Hofker, 1956 †
- Globigerina cretacea d'Orbigny, 1840 † (later reclassified as Muricohedbergella delrioensis)
- Globigerina dubia Egger, 1857 †
- Globigerina falconensis Blow, 1959
- Globigerina hexagona Natland, 1938
- Globigerina paratriloculinoides Hofker, 1956 †
- Globigerina paravenezuelana Hofker, 1956 †
- Globigerina protoreticulata Hofker, 1956 †
- Globigerina pseudocretacea Hofker, 1956 †
- Globigerina stainforthi Hofker, 1956 †
- Globigerina supracretacea Hofker, 1956 †
