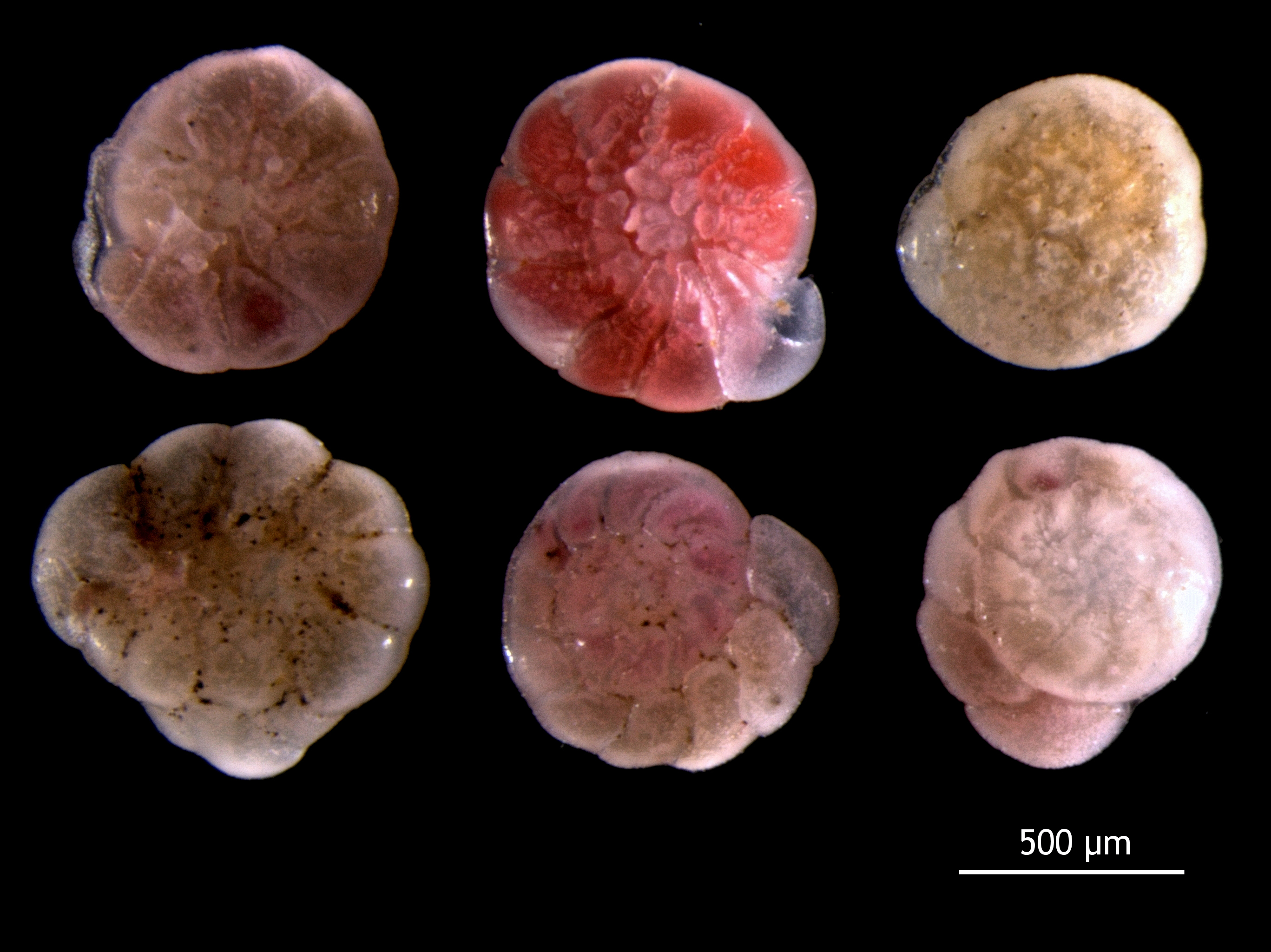
- Ammonia beccarii

Scientific classification
- Domain: Eukaryota
- Clade: Sar
- Clade: Rhizaria
- Phylum: Retaria
- Subphylum: Foraminifera
- Class: Rotaliata; Mikhalevich, 1980

Subclasses
- Rotaliana; Globigerinana; Textulariana

= Rotaliata =

Rotaliata Temporal range: Carboniferous - Recent

Class of single-celled organisms

Rotaliata is a class of Foraminifera characterized by tests that are exclusively multichambered, mostly planospiral or trochspiral, or derived from either. The aperture is commonly at the base of the apertural face, at least in early stages, but may be terminal, and single or complex. Test interior may be complex with secondary chambers and interconnecting canal system.

Composition is of hyaline (glassy) calcite as in the Rotaliana and Globigerinana or agglutinated as in the Textulariana.
