= Global Paleoclimate Indicators =

Global paleoclimate indicators are the proxies sensitive to global paleoclimatic environment changes. They are mostly derived from marine sediments. Paleoclimate indicators derived from terrestrial sediments, on the other hand, are commonly influenced by local tectonic movements and paleogeographic variations. Factors governing the Earth's climate system include plate tectonics, which controls the configuration of continents, the interplay between the atmosphere and the ocean, and the Earth's orbital characteristics (Milankovitch cycles). Global paleoclimate indicators are established based on the information extracted from the analyses of geologic materials, including biological, geochemical and mineralogical data preserved in marine sediments. Indicators are generally grouped into three categories; paleontological, geochemical and lithological.

== Paleontological indicators ==
Sedimentary records are influenced by local topography and oceanic and atmospheric currents. Proxies of global climatic significance are, however, less ambiguous in paleotemperature interpretation. Marine biota have offered by far the most proxies for paleotemperature, of which the microfossils, because of their widespread, abundance and sensitive to latitudinal changes, have provided many primary important paleotemperature indicators. Identification of latitudinal indices species is usually the first attempt to tie their presence in sediments to paleotemperature fluctuations. Other properties of marine biota, including morphology, abundance, diversity, and geochemistry have also been successfully established as paleoclimate indicators. More complex statistical analyses (factor analysis, principal component, etc.) of biogeography have been able to link fauna assemblages to water masses for paleo-current reconstruction. List below are some key paleontological tools utilized by scientists to reconstruct paleotemperature history.

=== Foraminferals ===
Because of their widespread distribution and abundance in sediments, forams have been the most extensively explored for their biological characters linked to paleoclimatic and paleoecologic reconstructions. Numerous reports have documented both planktonic and benthic forams as proxies for paleotemperature. These include the studies of morphological and biogeographical responses to surface temperature.

==== Morphology ====
===== Size =====
Investigations of planktonic foraminiferal populations indicate that tropical species attain their largest test sizes in tropical waters, and polar species reach maximum sizes in polar waters. Species living in subtropical and subpolar waters decrease in test size with both increasing and decreasing temperature.

The proloculus (the first chamber) sizes of benthic forams are affected by sea water temperature and their mean has been used as a proxy for paleoclimatic investigations.

Mean test diameters of the planktonic foraminifer Orbulina universa have been used to interpret sea surface temperature history in the Somali Basin. R-mode factor and Q-mode cluster analyses define five significant factor assemblages and five clusters reflecting different environmental characteristics, including increased oxygenation, high surface productivity.

===== Coiling direction =====
A number of forams have been cited to have different coiling directions in response to surface temperature. Globierina pachyderma, for example, exhibits a dominant population of right coiling direction in cold water vs. left in warm water, and the ratio of these two forms has been utilized to estimate paleotemperature. A similar dependency of coiling directions on temperatures has been reported for Muricohebergella delrioensis in Cretaceous sediments.

Globigerina bulloides, a benthic foram, has been documented for its coiling directions related to seawater temperatures in surface sediments of the southern Indian Ocean.

A similar relationship has been documented for another benthic foram Bulinina marginata.

==== Species diversity ====
Planktonic foraminiferal species diversity depends on available niches, which are in turn related to ocean circulation. By correlation with stable isotope records, maximum diversity has been found to occur after the initiation of a glaciation period.

==== Biogeography ====
Since the deep sea cores became available in the 1960s, paleoclimatic indices of planktonic foraminifera from marine sediments have been used for paleoclimatic reconstruction. Among the early pioneers to apply foraminifera latitudinal abundances, Ericson and Wollin (1968) succeeded in establishing the Pleistocene glacial and interglacial cycles based on the ratios of cold and warm water species in tropical sediments. Similar work was extended to subantarctic region by Kennett (1970), who, based on subpolar cold and warm water planktonic foraminiferal species, reconstructed paleoclimatic changes in the Pleistocene, consistent in trends with those established in the tropical region.

When drilling cores, which recovered longer sediment columns than piston cores, came along, paleoclimatic reconstruction investigations were pushed back further in geological times. A climatic curve in the Oligocene was constructed in the Gulf of Mexico by using warm water indicators (Turborotalia pseudoampliapertura, Globoquadrina tripartita, Dentoglobigerina globularis, Dentoglobigerina baroemoenensis, “Globigerina” ciperoensis and Globigerinoides groups, and Cassigerinella chipolensis) and cold water indicators (Catapsydrax spp., Globorotaloides spp., Subbotina angiporoides group, Globigerina s. str., and the tenuitellids). A more extensive geographic coverage was investigated by Spezzaferri in 1995, who analyzed samples from drilling cores in the Atlantic, Indian and South Pacific Oceans and identified and grouped foraminifera into warmer, cooler, warm-temperate and cool-temperate indices. A paleoclimatic curve in the Oligocene and Miocene transition period was established and the curve was supported by the isotope data.

A more sophisticated approach to reconstruct paleoclimate involves using factor analysis. Thompson (1981) was able to relate six foraminiferal assemblages from core top samples to present water masses in the western North Pacific. A transfer function was generated to link the assemblages to sea surface temperatures. A paleotemperature curve for the past 150,000 years was reconstructed by applying this transfer function to old sediments in the cores.

Similar technique has been applied to the Eocene and Oligocene sediments and the forams have been categorized in surface, intermediate and deep water-mass groups. Thus water-mass stratification, in addition to paleotemperature fluctuation has been reconstructed.

=== Coccolith ===
A 15-degree of latitude shift has been noted for the distribution of some selected species of Coccoliths between recent sediments and mid-Wisconsin glacier sediments of the North Atlantic. Concentrations of coccoliths in marine sediments appear to be related to surface temperatures as well. This is demonstrated by the quantitative analysis of coccolith assemblages in the western Mediterranean Pleistocene sediments.

=== Radiolarians ===
Because of their resistant to cold water dissolution, which severely destroys the calcareous planktonic fossils at depth worldwide, Radiolarians has become one of the most commonly studied siliceous planktonic fossils for paleotemperature reconstruction. Study of Radiolarians in the North Pacific deep sea cores has revealed that increases in both species diversity and abundance correspond to major glaciation events of the last 16 million years. Changes in Radiolarian compositions are also evident to reflect in general sea surface temperature.

By applying statistical analyses (Q-mode factor analysis), many quantitative studies of Radiolarian assemblages from surface sediments have established a transfer function which enables the estimation of paleo-sea surface temperature. For example, Pisias et al. (1997) were able to identify assemblages representative to the present Pacific biogeography and used these assemblages to predict sea surface temperature of the last glacier maximum.

=== Diatoms ===
Diatom species in polar and subpolar marine environments commonly display a narrow range of ecological preferences, in terms of sea surface temperature and sea ice conditions. An established relationship between diatom assemblages and their ecological preferences in surface sediments, could, therefore, be applied to sediments below the surface. For example, statistical analyses of diatom in the Antarctic Peninsula surface sediments have established diatom assemblages indicative to sea ice and open marine conditions, and these assemblages have been used as proxies for glacial and interglacial stages respectively in the Holocene sediments.

Diatom studies of lacustrine sediments in Siberia and Mongolia demonstrate a close relationship during the last glacial maximum between planktonic diatom diversity and paleoclimate through the correlation with oxygen isotope records, which represent global ice volume changes.

=== Dinoflagellates ===
Investigation on dinoflagellate cyst in the Mediterranean Sea has identified warm and cold temperate dinocyst species and these species have been used to reconstruct the paleoclimate changes during the past 30,000 years.

=== Ostracods ===
Using ostracod crustaceans as palaeoclimate proxies has been well established for the Quaternary. Not only their indicator species, but also the trace element and stable isotope geochemistry of their shells have been documented as evidence of past climate fluctuations.

== Geochemical Indicators ==
=== Isotope ===
==== Oxygen ====
Its isotope fractionation is linked to water temperature and its isotope ratios from a variety of sources have been widely used to reconstruct paleoclimate. Oxygen isotope in calcium carbonates has become the most widely applied as geothermometer for estimating ancient ocean temperatures. The most successful applications of isotope paleoclimatology have been the study of foraminifera from deep-sea sediments. For instance, Shackleton and Kennett (1975) have established the Cenozoic paleotemperature history based on analyzing oxygen isotope composition of both planktonic and benthic foraminifera in the Antarctic region. Since the variations in the 18O/16O ratio in marine fossil records are global, the oxygen isotope stratigraphy has been used for chronological correlation.

==== Carbon ====
Stable carbon isotope composition is another widely used proxy for interpreting paleoenvironment conditions. The Surface temperature fluctuation from the Paleocene to Miocene has been established based on carbon isotope data from foraminifera in Antarctic region. The organic matter preserved in sediments records paleoecosystems, and its carbon isotope composition has been also utilized to reconstruct paleoclimatic evolution. For example, Rogers and Koons (1969) have reported that the carbon isotope ratios, derived from organic matter in Quaternary marine sediments in the Gulf of Mexico, correlate well with Pleistocene climate changes.

Chen et al. (2011) have documented ancient climate fluctuations since the last glacial maximum based on soil samples in Tibet. Other sources for organic carbon isotope used as proxies for paleoenvironment reconstruction include lacustrine deposits for lake level variations, fossilized vertebrates for precipitation fluctuations, oil shales for paleoecological and paleoclimate conditions.

=== Biomarkers ===
Lipid:In marine sediments, a stable lipid called IP25 (Ice Proxy with 25 carbon atoms), which is biosynthesized by sea-ice dwelling diatom, has been found to be generally related to spring sea-ice cover in the Arctic region, Thus this proxy could be used to reconstruct sea-ice coverage. A different biomarker, IPSO25 (Ice Proxy Southern Ocean with 25 carbon atoms) has been documented as a useful proxy for the sea-ice cover in the Antarctic region.

== Lithological indicators ==
=== Ice-rafted debris ===
Among all the lithological indicators, ice-rafted debris (IRD) is the most useful tool to reconstruct paleoclimate. High concentrations of IRD evidence the glacial intervals during which icebergs likely traveled far from Polar Regions。In the South Pacific, IRD has been used as proxy for glaciation in the Cenozoic and a glaciation history has been established for the Subantarctic region. The history is also supported by the foraminifera species diversity data.

In the western Arctic Ocean, investigation of ice-rafted debris has identified at least six glacial intervals in the last 1 million years. Deep-sea cores with high rates of sedimentation allow high resolution analyses of IRD. In the North Pacific, records of IRD have delineated interstadials (short time thermal event during glacial interval), which could be correlated with the similar events in the North Atlantic.

=== Marine carbonates ===
Carbonate in marine sediments predominantly comes from calcifying organisms, with a minor contribution from diagenesis and precipitation. Biogenic calcium carbonate has two polymorphs; calcite by foraminifera and coccolith and aragonite by corals and pteropods. While the distribution of foraminifera is generally global, that of corals is subtropical to tropical. Hence the distribution of fossil corals is commonly used as proxy for paleolatitudes. Kiessling et al. (1999) have compiled a database for the “Phanerozoic reefs” including their paleopostions for paleoclimatological reconstructions Maillet et al. (2021), based on the distribution of Carboniferous coral reefs demonstrated the warm paleoclimatic conditions during the Mississippian, characterized by the wide spread of coral reefs on the supercontinent of Pangea, and this is followed by early Pennsylvanian cooling, marked by rare occurrence of coral reefs.

=== Oolitic limestone ===
Marine carbonate ooids are formed in warm, supersaturated, shallow, highly agitated marine water intertidal environments, and their presence in geological records provides a key role in paleoclimatic and paleogeographic reconstructions. Huang et al. (2017), for example, based on the distribution of Permian ooids and glaciomarine diamictites, have repositioned the Baoshan Block in southwestern China, with respect to other Gondwana continents.
