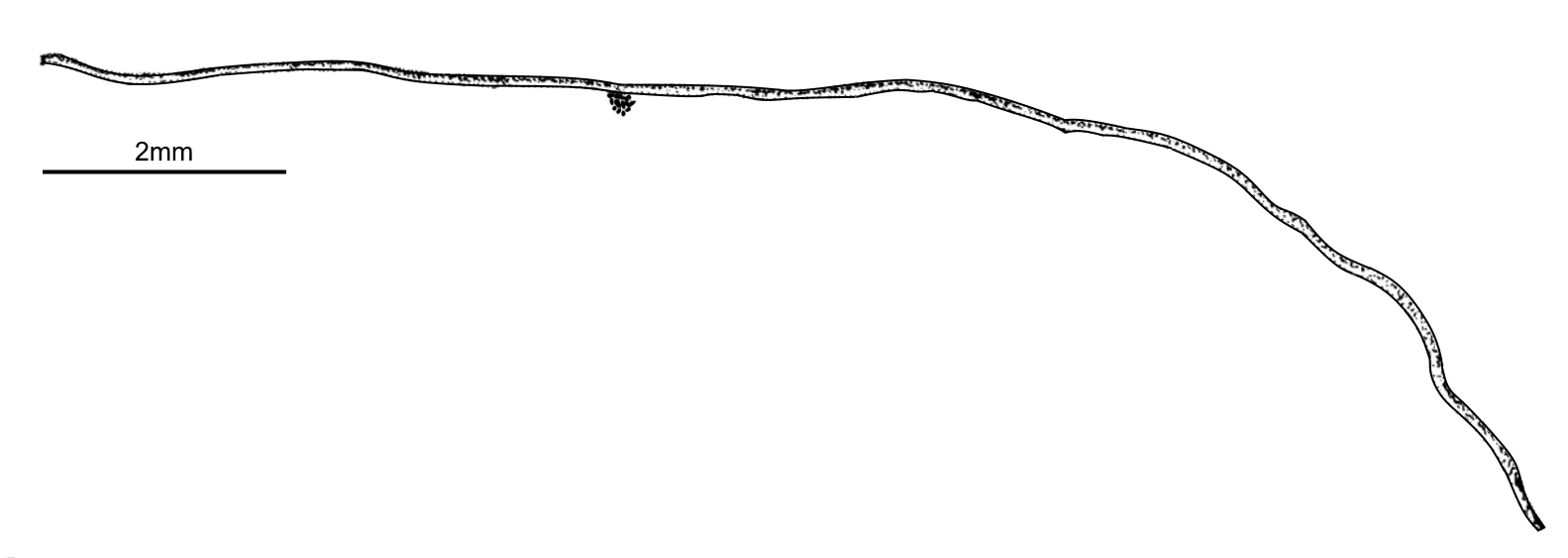
- Illustration based on the holotype of Linea simplex

Scientific classification
- Domain: Eukaryota
- Clade: Sar
- Clade: Rhizaria
- Phylum: Foraminifera
- Class: Monothalamea
- Order: Astrorhizida
- Family: Rhabdamminidae
- Subfamily: Rhabdammininae
- Genus: Linea; Schröder, Medioli & Scott, 1989
- Species: L. simplex

Binomial name
- Linea simplex Schröder, Medioli & Scott, 1989

= Linea =

Genus of foraminifera

Linea (from Latin linea 'string') is a genus of foraminifera belonging to the subfamily Rhabdammininae. It is a monotypic genus containing the sole species Linea simplex (from Latin simplex 'plain'). It was described in 1989 from samples of foraminifera collected at the Nares Abyssal Plain. The test of the organism consists of a flexible unbranched tube, several centimiters long, with a diameter of around 80 μm.

== Etymology ==
The generic name comes from the Latin noun linea meaning string, due to the string-like appearance of the organism. The specific epithet comes from the Latin adjective simplex meaning plain, simple.

== Description ==
Linea simplex has an overall string-like appearance, with a thin unbranching test in the shape of a flexible tube with a consistent diameter of around 80 μm. The tube is several centimeters long, irregularly filled by dark material, presumably stercomata. It is morphologically reminiscent of the genus Dendrophrya, but differs in being unbranched. It also has similarities with Bathysiphon, but is smaller in diameter and has a much thinner wall section. The full organism measures several centimeters.

== Taxonomy ==
The genus Linea was described in 1989 by paleontologists Claudia J. Schröder, F. S. Medioli and D. B. Scott, as part of a survey on the benthic foraminiferal community of the Nares Abyssal Plain, located in the western North Atlantic Ocean. They studied and identified abyssal foraminifera collected in 1984 during a sampling program of the Dutch Seabed Working Group, and their identifications were based solely on the test morphology. They identified a total of 20 new species, including Linea simplex, which they assigned as the type species of the genus Linea. The authors were unable to take a photograph of the organism due to its long, narrow and springy tubular chamber that could not stay coiled and fit under any microscope objective. As the species is morphologically so simple, they decided to publish an illustration of the holotype. The holotype, measuring 13.3 mm, was recovered from the Nares Abyssal Plain at a depth of 5775 meters and was collected by Claudia Schröder. Its illustration was deposited at the National Museum of Natural History with the registration number 430206.

Upon its description, the genus Linea was classified in the subfamily Rhabdammininae, together with the genera Marsipella and Rhabdammina.
