= Heterohelix =

Heterohelix Temporal range: Santonian - Late Paleocene

Scientific classification
- Domain: Eukaryota
- Clade: Diaphoretickes
- Clade: SAR
- Clade: Rhizaria
- Phylum: Retaria
- Subphylum: Foraminifera
- Class: Globothalamea
- Order: Rotaliida
- Family: Heterohelicidae
- Subfamily: †Heterohelicinae
- Genus: †Heterohelix; Ehrenberg, 1843

Species
- See text

Extinct genus of single-celled organisms

Heterohelix is an extinct genus of foraminifera belonging to the family Heterohelicidae of the superfamily Heterohelicoidea and the suborder Globigerinina. Its type species is Heterohelix americana (formerly Textilaria americana).

== Species ==
Species in Heterohelix include:

- Heterohelix americana
- Heterohelix budugensis
- Heterohelix buliminiformis
- Heterohelix bulloides
- Heterohelix calabarflanki
- Heterohelix carinata
- Heterohelix concinna
- Heterohelix cornuta
- Heterohelix digitata
- Heterohelix elongata
- Heterohelix gradata
- Heterohelix hohenemsensis
- Heterohelix ilkhidagensis
- Heterohelix irregularis
- Heterohelix labellosa
- Heterohelix oculis
- Heterohelix perquadrata
- Heterohelix praeelongata
- Heterohelix praegradata
- Heterohelix praeirregularis
- Heterohelix pseudocarseyae
- Heterohelix pseudoreussi
- Heterohelix robusta
- Heterohelix sphenoides
- Heterohelix stenopos
- Heterohelix suwalkensis
- Heterohelix trochospiralis
- Heterohelix varsoviensis
- Heterohelix vistulaensis
- subgenus Heterohelix (Heterohelix)
  - Heterohelix (Heterohelix) planeobtusa
