= Cassigerinella =

Cassigerinella Temporal range: Bartonian - Serravallian

Scientific classification
- Domain: Eukaryota
- Clade: Sar
- Clade: Rhizaria
- Phylum: Retaria
- Subphylum: Foraminifera
- Class: Globothalamea
- Order: Rotaliida
- Family: †Cassigerinellidae
- Genus: †Cassigerinella; Pokorný, 1955

Extinct genus of single-celled organisms

Cassigerinella is an extinct genus of foraminifera belonging to the family Cassigerinellidae of the superfamily Guembelitrioidea and the suborder Globigerinina. Its type species is Cassigerinella chipolensis.

== Species ==
Species in Cassigerinella include:

- Cassigerinella chipolensis
- Cassigerinella eocaenica
- Cassigerinella martinezpicoi
- Cassigerinella regularis
- Cassigerinella spinata
