= Cassigerinella chipolensis =

Cassigerinella chipolensis Temporal range: Bartonian - Serravallian

Scientific classification
- Domain: Eukaryota
- Clade: Sar
- Clade: Rhizaria
- Phylum: Retaria
- Subphylum: Foraminifera
- Class: Globothalamea
- Order: Rotaliida
- Family: †Cassigerinellidae
- Genus: †Cassigerinella
- Species: †C. chipolensis

Binomial name
- †Cassigerinella chipolensis Cushman & Ponton, 1932

Synonyms
- Cassidulina chipolensis Cushman & Ponton, 1932; Cassigerinella boudecensis Pokorný, 1955; Cassigerinella globolocula Ivanova, 1958

Species of single-celled organism

Cassigerinella chipolensis is an extinct species of foraminifera belonging to the genus Cassigerinella, the family Cassigerinellidae and the suborder Globigerinina.
