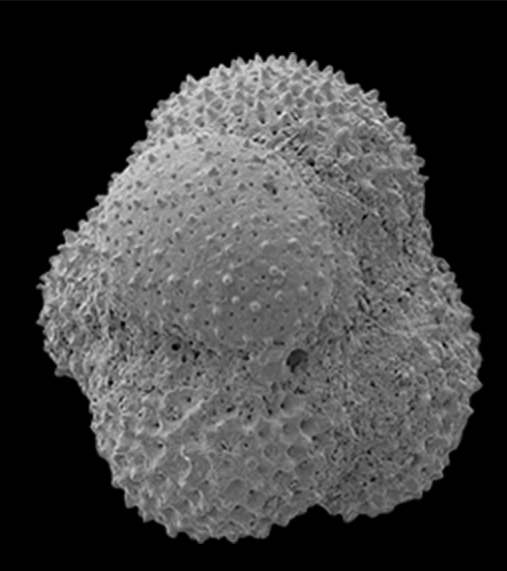
- Acarinina echinata

Scientific classification
- Domain: Eukaryota
- Clade: Diaphoretickes
- Clade: SAR
- Clade: Rhizaria
- Phylum: Retaria
- Subphylum: Foraminifera
- Class: Globothalamea
- Order: Rotaliida
- Suborder: Globigerinina
- Superfamily: Globorotalioidea
- Family: †Truncorotaloididae
- Genus: †Acarinina; Subbotina, 1953

= Acarinina =

Acarinina Temporal range: Early Paleocene - Bartonian

Extinct genus of single-celled organisms

Acarinina is an extinct genus of foraminifera belonging to the family Truncorotaloididae of the superfamily Globorotalioidea and the suborder Globigerinina. Its fossil range is from the upper Paleocene to the middle Eocene. Its type species is Acarinina nitida.

== Description ==
The test is subglobular, close coiled and low trochospiral. It has four to five rapidly enlarging chambers per whorl. It has a cosmopolitan distribution.

== Species ==
Species in Acarinina include:

- Acarinina africana
- Acarinina alticonica
- Acarinina angulosa
- Acarinina aquiensis
- Acarinina aspensis
- Acarinina bollii
- Acarinina boudreauxi
- Acarinina bucharensis
- Acarinina bullbrooki
- Acarinina coalingensis
- Acarinina collactea
- Acarinina compacta
- Acarinina convexa
- Acarinina cuneicamerata
- Acarinina discors
- Acarinina dzegviensis
- Acarinina echinata
- Acarinina esnaensis
- Acarinina esnehensis
- Acarinina falsospiralis
- Acarinina intermedia
- Acarinina interposita
- Acarinina kiwensis
- Acarinina mattseensis
- Acarinina mcgowrani
- Acarinina mckannai
- Acarinina medizzai
- Acarinina microspherica
- Acarinina multicamerata
- Acarinina multiloculata
- Acarinina nachtschevanica
- Acarinina nitida
- Acarinina oblonga
- Acarinina pentacamerata
- Acarinina planodorsalis
- Acarinina praetopilensis
- Acarinina primitiva
- Acarinina proxima
- Acarinina pseudosubsphaera
- Acarinina pseudotopilensis
- Acarinina punctocarinata
- Acarinina quadratoseptata
- Acarinina quetra
- Acarinina rohri
- Acarinina rotundimarginata
- Acarinina rugosoaculeata
- Acarinina sibaiyaensis
- Acarinina sirabensis
- Acarinina soldadoensis
- Acarinina spinuloinflata
- Acarinina strabocella
- Acarinina subintermedia
- Acarinina subsphaerica
- Acarinina topilensis
- Acarinina umbilicata
- Acarinina umbonata
- Acarinina vedica
- Acarinina wilcoxensis
