= Hedbergella =

Hedbergella Temporal range: Early - Late Cretaceous (Hauterivian - Maastrichtian)

Scientific classification
- Domain: Eukaryota
- Clade: Diaphoretickes
- Clade: SAR
- Clade: Rhizaria
- Phylum: Retaria
- Subphylum: Foraminifera
- Class: Globothalamea
- Order: Rotaliida
- Family: †Hedbergellidae
- Subfamily: †Hedbergellinae
- Genus: †Hedbergella; Brönnimann and Brown, 1958

Species
- See text

Extinct genus of single-celled organisms

Hedbergella is an extinct genus of planktonic foraminifera from the Cretaceous, described by Loeblich and Tappan, 1961, as:

Test free, trochospiral, biconvex, umbilicate, periphery rounded with no indication of keel or poreless margin; chambers globular to ovate; sutures depressed, radial, straight or curved; wall calcareous, finely perforate, radial in structure, surface smooth to hispid or rugose; aperture an interiomarginal, extraumbilical-umbilical arch commonly bordered above by a narrow lip or spatulate flap, ... Includes species otherwise similar to Praeglobotruncana but which lack a keel or poreless margin, hence is regarded as a separate genus rather than as a subgenus of Praeglobotruncana as by Banner and Blow (1959).

Hedbergella was named by Brönnimann and Brown in 1958, and is included in the family Hedbergellidae and the suborder Globigerinina. Hedbergella ranges through most of the Cretaceous, from the Hauterivian to the Maastrichtian at the end.

== Related genera ==
Genera possibly related closely to Hedbergella are Asterohedbergella, Costellagerina, and Whiteinella, which are included with Hedbergella in the Hedbergellinae, but which have shorter ranges.

Asterohedbergella, which has a stellate outline, is from the Upper Cretaceous (M. to U. Cenomanian) of Israel. Costellagerina, which has a lobate outline, is from the Upper Cretaceous (Cenomanian to Campanian) and is cosmopolitan. Whiteinella, which has a pustulate surface, is from the U. Cretaceous (M. Cenomanian to M. Turonian), and is also cosmopolitan.

The species Muricohedbergella delrioensis, originally described as Globigerina cretacea var. delrioensis, was formerly accepted as Hedbergella delrioensis.

== Species ==
Species in Hedbergella include:

- Hedbergella accurata
- Hedbergella angularica
- Hedbergella aptiana
- Hedbergella compacta
- Hedbergella costatus
- Hedbergella excelsa
- Hedbergella gorbachickae
- Hedbergella hagni
- Hedbergella handousi
- Hedbergella hexacamerata
- Hedbergella hiltermanni
- Hedbergella hispaniae
- Hedbergella infracretacea
- Hedbergella kuhryi
- Hedbergella kuznetsovae
- Hedbergella labocaensis
- Hedbergella laculata
- Hedbergella luterbacheri
- Hedbergella madagascarensis
- Hedbergella maslakovae
- Hedbergella mitra
- Hedbergella modesta
- Hedbergella murphyi
- Hedbergella occulta
- Hedbergella porkulecensis
- Hedbergella praelippa
- Hedbergella praetrocoidea
- Hedbergella primare
- Hedbergella pseudoplanispiralis
- Hedbergella quadrata
- Hedbergella quadricamerata
- Hedbergella ranzenbergensis
- Hedbergella retroflexa
- Hedbergella roblesae
- Hedbergella ruka
- Hedbergella semielongata
- Hedbergella sigali
- Hedbergella similis
- Hedbergella speetonensis
- Hedbergella tardita
- Hedbergella tatianae
- Hedbergella telatynensis
- Hedbergella tissaloensis
- Hedbergella trocoidea
- Hedbergella tunisiensis
- Hedbergella tuschepsensis
- Hedbergella velata
- Hedbergella ventriosa
- Hedbergella yezoana
