= Paleogene =

First period of the Cenozoic Era

- 66.0 – 23.04 Ma
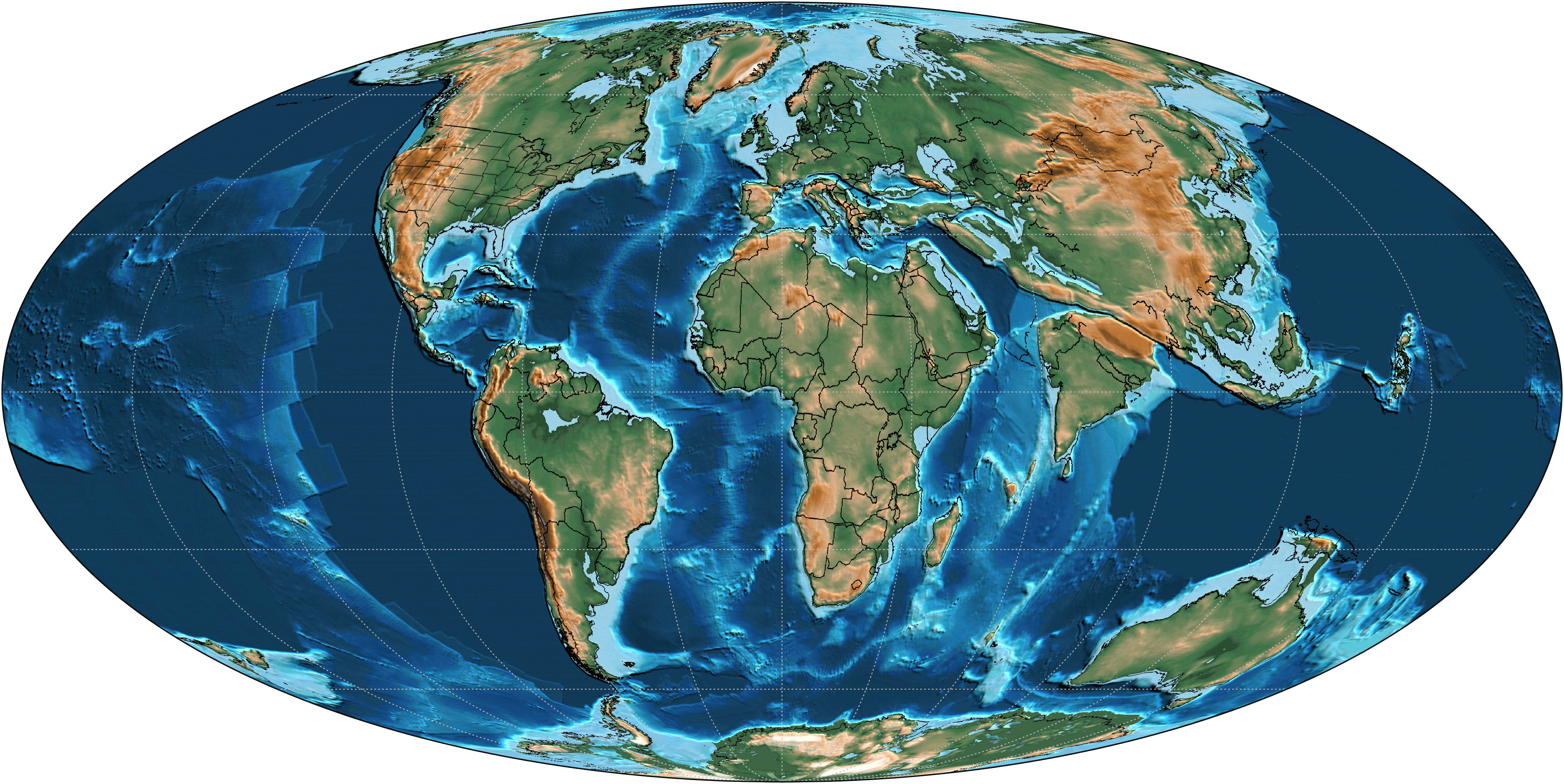
- A map of Earth as it appeared 45 million years ago during the Paleogene Period, Eocene Epoch

Chronology
← / PETM; ← / First Antarctic permanent ice-sheets; ← / K-Pg mass extinction
Subdivision of the Paleogene according to the ICS, as of 2024. Vertical axis scale: Millions of years ago

Etymology
- Name formality: Formal
- Alternate spelling(s): Palaeogene, Palæogene

Usage information
- Celestial body: Earth
- Regional usage: Global (ICS)
- Time scale(s) used: ICS Time Scale

Definition
- Chronological unit: Period
- Stratigraphic unit: System
- Time span formality: Formal
- Lower boundary definition: Iridium enriched layer associated with a major meteorite impact and subsequent K–Pg extinction event.
- Lower boundary GSSP: El Kef Section, El Kef, Tunisia; 36.1537°N 8.6486°E
- Lower GSSP ratified: 1991
- Upper boundary definition: Base of magnetic polarity chronozone C6Cn.2n.; Near first appearance of the Planktonic foraminiferan Paragloborotalia kugleri.
- Upper boundary GSSP: Lemme-Carrosio Section, Carrosio, Italy; 44.6589°N 8.8364°E
- Upper GSSP ratified: 1996

Atmospheric and climatic data
- Mean atmospheric O_{2} content: c. 26 vol % (125% of modern)
- Mean atmospheric CO_{2} content: c. 500 ppm (1.8 times pre-industrial)
- Mean surface temperature: c. 18 °C (4.5 °C above pre-industrial)

The Paleogene Period (IPA: /ˈpeɪli.ədʒiːn, -li.oʊ-, ˈpæli-/ PAY-lee-ə-jeen, -lee-oh-, PAL-ee-; also spelled Palaeogene or Palæogene) is a geologic period and system that spans 43 million years from the end of the Cretaceous Period 66 Ma (million years ago) to the beginning of the Neogene Period 23.04 Ma. It is the first period of the Cenozoic Era, the tenth period of the Phanerozoic and is divided into the Paleocene, Eocene, and Oligocene epochs. The earlier term Tertiary Period was used to define the time now covered by the Paleogene and subsequent Neogene periods; despite no longer being recognized as a formal stratigraphic term, Tertiary sometimes remains in informal use. Paleogene is often abbreviated Pg, although the United States Geological Survey uses the abbreviation Pe for the Paleogene on the Survey's geologic maps.

Much of the world's modern vertebrate diversity originated in a rapid surge of diversification in the early Paleogene, as survivors of the Cretaceous–Paleogene extinction event took advantage of empty ecological niches left behind by the extinction of the non-avian dinosaurs, pterosaurs, marine reptiles, and primitive fish groups. Mammals continued to diversify from relatively small, simple forms into a highly diverse group ranging from small-bodied forms to very large ones, radiating into multiple orders and colonizing the air and marine ecosystems by the Eocene. Birds, the only surviving group of dinosaurs, quickly diversified from the very few neognath and paleognath clades that survived the extinction event, also radiating into multiple orders, colonizing different ecosystems and achieving an extreme level of morphological diversity. Percomorph fish, the most diverse group of vertebrates today, first appeared near the end of the Cretaceous but saw a very rapid radiation into their modern order and family-level diversity during the Paleogene, achieving a diverse array of morphologies.

The Paleogene is marked by considerable changes in climate from the Paleocene–Eocene thermal maximum, through global cooling during the Eocene to the first appearance of permanent ice sheets in the Antarctic at the beginning of the Oligocene.

== Geology ==
=== Stratigraphy ===
The Paleogene is divided into three series or epochs: the Paleocene, Eocene, and Oligocene. These stratigraphic units can be defined globally or regionally. For global stratigraphic correlation, the International Commission on Stratigraphy (ICS) ratifies global stages based on a Global Boundary Stratotype Section and Point (GSSP) from a single formation (a stratotype) identifying the lower boundary of the stage.

==== Paleocene ====
The Paleocene is the first epoch of the Paleogene and lasted from 66.0 to 56.0 Ma. It is divided into three stages: the Danian 66.0–61.6 Ma; Selandian 61.6–59.2 Ma; and Thanetian 59.2–56.0 Ma. The GSSP for the base of the Cenozoic, Paleogene and Paleocene is at Oued Djerfane, west of El Kef, Tunisia. It is marked by an iridium anomaly produced by an asteroid impact, and is associated with the Cretaceous–Paleogene (K–Pg) extinction event. The boundary is defined as the rusty colored base of a 50 cm (20 in) thick clay, which would have been deposited over only a few days. Similar layers are seen in marine and continental deposits worldwide. These layers include the iridium anomaly, microtektites, nickel-rich spinel crystals and shocked quartz, all indicators of a major extraterrestrial impact. The remains of the crater are found at Chicxulub on the Yucatan Peninsula in Mexico. The extinction of the non-avian dinosaurs, ammonites and dramatic changes in marine plankton and many other groups of organisms, are also used for correlation purposes.

==== Eocene ====
The Eocene is the second epoch of the Paleogene, and lasted from 56.0 to 33.9 Ma. It is divided into four stages: the Ypresian 56.0 to 47.8 Ma; Lutetian 47.8 to 41.2 Ma; Bartonian 41.2 to 37.71 Ma; and, Priabonian 37.71 to 33.9 Ma. The GSSP for the base of the Eocene is at Dababiya, near Luxor, Egypt and is marked by the start of a significant variation in global carbon isotope ratios, produced by a major period of global warming. The change in climate was due to a rapid release of frozen methane clathrates from seafloor sediments at the beginning of the Paleocene–Eocene thermal maximum (PETM).

==== Oligocene ====
The Oligocene is the third and youngest epoch of the Paleogene, and lasted from 33.9 Ma to 23.03 Ma. It is divided into two stages: the Rupelian (33.9 to 27.82 Ma) and Chattian (27.82 to 23.03 Ma). The GSSP for the base of the Oligocene is at Massignano, near Ancona, Italy. The extinction of the hantkeninid planktonic foraminifera is the key marker for the Eocene–Oligocene boundary, which was a time of climate cooling that led to widespread changes in fauna and flora.

== Palaeogeography ==
The final stages of the breakup of Pangaea occurred during the Paleogene as rifting of the Atlantic Ocean and seafloor spreading extended northwards, separating the North American and Eurasian plates, and Australia and South America rifted from Antarctica, opening the Southern Ocean. Africa and India collided with Eurasia forming the Alpine-Himalayan mountain chains and the western margin of the Pacific plate changed from a divergent to convergent plate boundary.

=== Alpine–Himalayan orogeny ===
==== Alpine orogeny ====
The Alpine orogeny developed in response to the collision between the African and Eurasian plates during the closing of the Neotethys Ocean and the opening of the Central Atlantic Ocean. The result was a series of arcuate mountain ranges, from the Tell-Rif-Betic cordillera in the western Mediterranean through the Alps, Carpathians, Apennines, Dinarides and Hellenides to the Taurides in the east.

From the Late Cretaceous into the early Paleocene, Africa began to converge with Eurasia. The irregular outlines of the continental margins, including the Adriatic promontory (Adria) that extended north from the African plate, led to the development of several short subduction zones, rather than one long system. In the western Mediterranean, the European plate was subducted southwards beneath the African plate, whilst in the eastern Mediterranean, Africa was subducted beneath Eurasia along a northward dipping subduction zone. Convergence between the Iberian and European plates led to the Pyrenean orogeny and, as Adria pushed northwards the Alps and Carpathian orogens began to develop.

Present day tectonic map of southern Europe, North Africa and the Middle East, showing structures of the western Alpine-Himalayan orogenic belt

The collision of Adria with Eurasia in the early Palaeocene was followed by a c. 10 million year pause in the convergence of Africa and Eurasia, connected with the onset of the opening of the North Atlantic Ocean as Greenland rifted from the Eurasian plate in the Palaeocene. Convergence rates between Africa and Eurasia increased again in the early Eocene and the remaining oceanic basins between Adria and Europe closed.

Between about 40 and 30 Ma, subduction began along the western Mediterranean arc of the Tell, Rif, Betic and Apennine mountain chains. The rate of convergence was less than the subduction rate of the dense lithosphere of the western Mediterranean and roll-back of the subducting slab led to the arcuate structure of these mountain ranges.

In the eastern Mediterranean, c. 35 Ma, the Anatolide-Tauride platform (northern part of Adria) began to enter the trench leading to the development of the Dinarides, Hellenides and Tauride mountain chains as the passive margin sediments of Adria were scrapped off onto the Eurasia crust during subduction.

==== Zagros Mountains ====
The Zagros mountain belt stretches for c. 2000 km from the eastern border of Iraq to the Makran coast in southern Iran. It formed as a result of the convergence and collision of the Arabian and Eurasian plates as the Neotethys Ocean closed and is composed sediments scraped from the descending Arabian Plate.

From the Late Cretaceous, a volcanic arc developed on the Eurasia margin as the Neotethys crust was subducted beneath it. A separate intra-oceanic subduction zone in the Neotethys resulted in the obduction of ocean crust onto the Arabian margin in the Late Cretaceous to Paleocene, with break-off of the subducted oceanic plate close to the Arabian margin occurring during the Eocene. Continental collision began during the Eocene c. 35 Ma and continued into the Oligocene to c. 26 Ma.

==== Himalayan orogeny ====
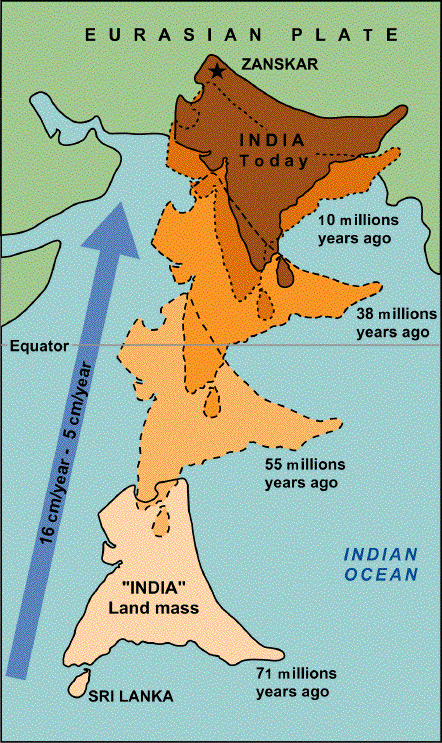
Map showing the northwards drift of the Indian continent between 71 and 0 Ma. The leading edge of Greater India (not shown on the map) collided with the Eurasian plate c. 55 Ma, whilst India itself still lay to the south. (From: Dèzes, 1999)

The Indian continent rifted from Madagascar at c. 83 Ma and drifted rapidly (c. 18 cm/yr in the Paleocene) northwards towards the southern margin of Eurasia. A rapid decrease in velocity to c. 5 cm/yr in the early Eocene records the collision of the Tethyan (Tibetan) Himalayas, the leading edge of Greater India, with the Lhasa terrane of Tibet (southern Eurasian margin), along the Indus-Yarling-Zangbo suture zone. To the south of this zone, the Himalaya are composed of metasedimentary rocks scraped off the now subducted Indian continental crust and mantle lithosphere as the collision progressed.

Palaeomagnetic data place the present day Indian continent further south at the time of collision and decrease in plate velocity, indicating the presence of a large region to the north of India that has now been subducted beneath the Eurasian plate or incorporated into the mountain belt. This region, known as Greater India, formed by extension along the northern margin of India during the opening of the Neotethys. The Tethyan Himalaya block lay along its northern edge, with the Neotethys Ocean lying between it and southern Eurasia.

Debate about the amount of deformation seen in the geological record in the India–Eurasia collision zone versus the size of Greater India, the timing and nature of the collision relative to the decrease in plate velocity, and explanations for the unusually high velocity of the Indian plate have led to several models for Greater India: 1) A Late Cretaceous to early Paleocene subduction zone may have lain between India and Eurasia in the Neotethys, dividing the region into two plates, subduction was followed by collision of India with Eurasia in the middle Eocene. In this model Greater India would have been less than 900 km wide; 2) Greater India may have formed a single plate, several thousand kilometres wide, with the Tethyan Himalaya microcontinent separated from the Indian continent by an oceanic basin. The microcontinent collided with southern Eurasia c. 58 Ma (late Paleocene), whilst the velocity of the plate did not decrease until c. 50 Ma when subduction rates dropped as young, oceanic crust entered the subduction zone; 3) This model assigns older dates to parts of Greater India, which changes its paleogeographic position relative to Eurasia and creates a Greater India formed of extended continental crust 2000–3000 km wide.

==== South East Asia ====
The Alpine-Himalayan Orogenic Belt in Southeast Asia extends from the Himalayas in India through Myanmar (West Burma block) Sumatra, Java to West Sulawesi.

During the Late Cretaceous to Paleogene, the northward movement of the Indian plate led to the highly oblique subduction of the Neotethys along the edge of the West Burma block and the development of a major north-south transform fault along the margin of Southeast Asia to the south. Between c. 60 and 50 Ma, the leading northeastern edge of Greater India collided with the West Burma block resulting in deformation and metamorphism. During the middle Eocene, north-dipping subduction resumed along the southern edge of Southeast Asia, from west Sumatra to West Sulawesi, as the Australian plate drifted slowly northwards.

Collision between India and the West Burma block was complete by the late Oligocene. As the India-Eurasia collision continued, movement of material away from the collision zone was accommodated along, and extended, the already existing major strike slip systems of the region.

=== Atlantic Ocean ===
During the Paleocene, seafloor spreading along the Mid-Atlantic Ridge propagated from the Central Atlantic northwards between North America and Greenland in the Labrador Sea (c. 62 Ma) and Baffin Bay (c. 57 Ma), and, by the early Eocene (c. 54 Ma), into the northeastern Atlantic between Greenland and Eurasia. Extension between North America and Eurasia, also in the early Eocene, led to the opening of the Eurasian Basin across the Arctic, which was linked to the Baffin Bay Ridge and Mid-Atlantic Ridge to the south via major strike slip faults.

From the Eocene and into the early Oligocene, Greenland acted as an independent plate moving northwards and rotating anticlockwise. This led to compression across the Canadian Arctic Archipelago, Svalbard and northern Greenland resulting in the Eureka orogeny. From c. 47 Ma, the eastern margin of Greenland was cut by the Reykjanes Ridge (the northeastern branch of the Mid-Atlantic Ridge) propagating northwards and splitting off the Jan Mayen microcontinent.

After c. 33 Ma seafloor spreading in Labrador Sea and Baffin Bay gradually ceased and seafloor spreading focused along the northeast Atlantic. By the late Oligocene, the plate boundary between North America and Eurasia was established along the Mid-Atlantic Ridge, with Greenland attached to the North American plate again, and the Jan Mayen microcontinent part of the Eurasian plate, where its remains now lie to the east and possibly beneath the southeast of Iceland.

==== North Atlantic Large Igneous Province ====
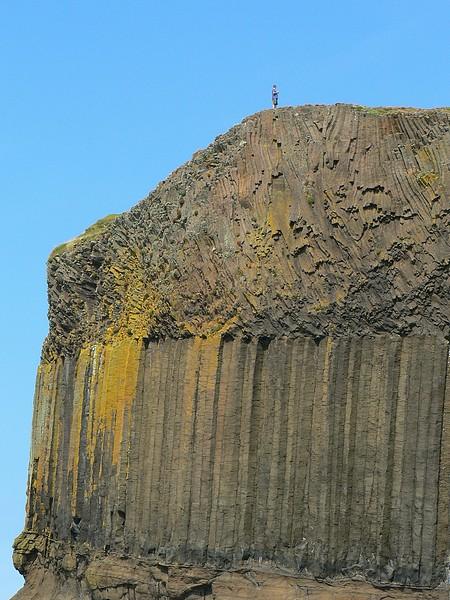
A Paleogene-aged basaltic lava flow on the Isle of Staffa, Scotland (person standing on cliff top for scale). The bottom section of this cliff is volcaniclastic rock. The middle and top sections are two parts of a single basaltic lava flow; each part of the lava flow cooled differently, forming rock with different characteristics. The middle layer shows spectacular columnar jointing resulting from relatively slow cooling; the top layer has very irregular closely-spaced joints caused by more rapid cooling.

The North Atlantic Igneous Province stretches across the Greenland and northwest European margins and is associated with the proto-Icelandic mantle plume, which rose beneath the Greenland lithosphere at c. 65 Ma. There were two main phases of volcanic activity with peaks at c. 60 Ma and c. 55 Ma. Magmatism in the British and Northwest Atlantic volcanic provinces occurred mainly in the early Palaeocene, the latter associated with an increased spreading rate in the Labrador Sea, whilst northeast Atlantic magmatism occurred mainly during the early Eocene and is associated with a change in the spreading direction in the Labrador Sea and the northward drift of Greenland. The locations of the magmatism coincide with the intersection of propagating the rifts and large-scale, pre-existing lithospheric structures, which acted as channels to the surface for the magma.

The arrival of the proto-Iceland plume has been considered the driving mechanism for rifting in the North Atlantic. However, that rifting and initial seafloor spreading occurred prior to the arrival of the plume, large scale magmatism occurred at a distance to rifting, and that rifting propagated towards, rather than away from the plume, has led to the suggestion the plume and associated magmatism may have been a result, rather than a cause, of the plate tectonic forces that led to the propagation of rifting from the Central to the North Atlantic.

=== Americas ===
==== North America ====
Mountain building continued along the North America Cordillera in response to subduction of the Farallon plate beneath the North American Plate. Along the central section of the North American margin, crustal shortening of the Cretaceous to Paleocene Sevier orogen lessened and deformation moved eastward. The decreasing dip of the subducting Farallon plate led to a flat-slab segment that increased friction between this and the base of the North American Plate. The resulting Laramide orogeny, which began the development of the Rocky Mountains, was a broad zone of thick-skinned deformation, with faults extending to mid-crustal depths and the uplift of basement rocks that lay to the east of the Sevier belt, and more than 700km from the trench. With the Laramide uplift the Western Interior Seaway was divided and then retreated.

During the mid to late Eocene (50–35 Ma), plate convergence rates decreased and the dip of the Farallon slab began to steepen. Uplift ceased and the region largely levelled by erosion. By the Oligocene, convergence gave way to extension, rifting and widespread volcanism across the Laramide belt.

==== South America ====
Ocean-continent convergence accommodated by east dipping subduction zone of the Farallon plate beneath the western edge of South America continued from the Mesozoic.

Over the Paleogene, changes in plate motion and episodes of regional slab shallowing and steepening resulted in variations in the magnitude of crustal shortening and amounts of magmatism along the length of the Andes. In the Northern Andes, an oceanic plateau with volcanic arc was accreted during the latest Cretaceous and Paleocene, whilst the Central Andes were dominated by the subduction of oceanic crust and the Southern Andes were impacted by the subduction of the Farallon-East Antarctic ocean ridge.

==== Caribbean ====
The Caribbean plate is largely composed of oceanic crust of the Caribbean Large Igneous Province that formed during the Late Cretaceous. During the Late Cretaceous to Paleocene, subduction of Atlantic crust was established along its northern margin, whilst to the southwest, an island arc collided with the northern Andes forming an east dipping subduction zone where Caribbean lithosphere was subducted beneath the South American margin.

During the Eocene (c. 45 Ma), subduction of the Farallon plate along the Central American subduction zone was (re)established. Subduction along the northern section of the Caribbean volcanic arc ceased as the Bahamas carbonate platform collided with Cuba and was replaced by strike-slip movements as a transform fault, extending from the Mid-Atlantic Ridge, connected with the northern boundary of the Caribbean Plate. Subduction now focused along the southern Caribbean arc (Lesser Antilles).

By the Oligocene, the intra-oceanic Central American volcanic arc began to collide with northwestern South American.

=== Pacific Ocean ===
At the beginning of the Paleogene, the Pacific Ocean consisted of the Pacific, Farallon, Kula and Izanagi plates. The central Pacific plate grew by seafloor spreading as the other three plates were subducted and broken up. In the southern Pacific, seafloor spreading continued from the Late Cretaceous across the Pacific–Antarctic, Pacific-Farallon and Farallon–Antarctic mid ocean ridges.

The Izanagi-Pacific spreading ridge lay nearly parallel to the East Asian subduction zone and between 60 and 50 Ma the spreading ridge began to be subducted. By c. 50 Ma, the Pacific plate was no longer surrounded by spreading ridges, but had a subduction zone along its western edge. This changed the forces acting on the Pacific plate and led to a major reorganisation of plate motions across the entire Pacific region. The resulting changes in stress between the Pacific and Philippine Sea plates initiated subduction along the Izu-Bonin-Mariana and Tonga-Kermadec arcs.

Subduction of the Farallon plate beneath the American plates continued from the Late Cretaceous. The Kula-Farallon spreading ridge lay to its north until the Eocene (c. 55 Ma), when the northern section of the plate split forming the Vancouver/Juan de Fuca plate. In the Oligocene (c. 28 Ma), the first segment of the Pacific–Farallon spreading ridge entered the North American subduction zone near Baja California leading to major strike-slip movements and the formation of the San Andreas Fault. At the Paleogene-Neogene boundary, spreading ceased between the Pacific and Farallon plates and the Farallon plate split again forming the present date Nazca and Cocos plates.

The Kula plate lay between Pacific plate and North America. To the north and northwest it was being subducted beneath the Aleutian trench. Spreading between the Kula and Pacific and Farallon plates ceased c. 40 Ma and the Kula plate became part of the Pacific Plate.

==== Hawaii hotspot ====
The Hawaiian-Emperor seamount chain formed above the Hawaiian hotspot. Originally thought to be stationary within the mantle, the hotspot is now considered to have drifted south during the Paleocene to early Eocene, as the Pacific plate moved north. At c. 47 Ma, movement of the hotspot ceased and the Pacific plate motion changed from northward to northwestward in response to the onset of subduction along its western margin. This resulted in a 60 degree bend in the seamount chain. Other seamount chains related to hotspots in the South Pacific show a similar change in orientation at this time.

=== Antarctica ===
Slow seafloor spreading continued between Australia and East Antarctica. Shallow water channels probably developed south of Tasmania opening the Tasmanian Passage in the Eocene and deep ocean routes opening from the mid Oligocene. Rifting between the Antarctic Peninsula and the southern tip of South America formed the Drake Passage and opened the Southern Ocean also during this time, completing the breakup of Gondwana. The opening of these passages and the creation of the Southern Ocean established the Antarctic Circumpolar Current. Glaciers began to build across the Antarctica continent that now lay isolated in the south polar region and surrounded by cold ocean waters. These changes contributed to the fall in global temperatures and the beginning of icehouse conditions.

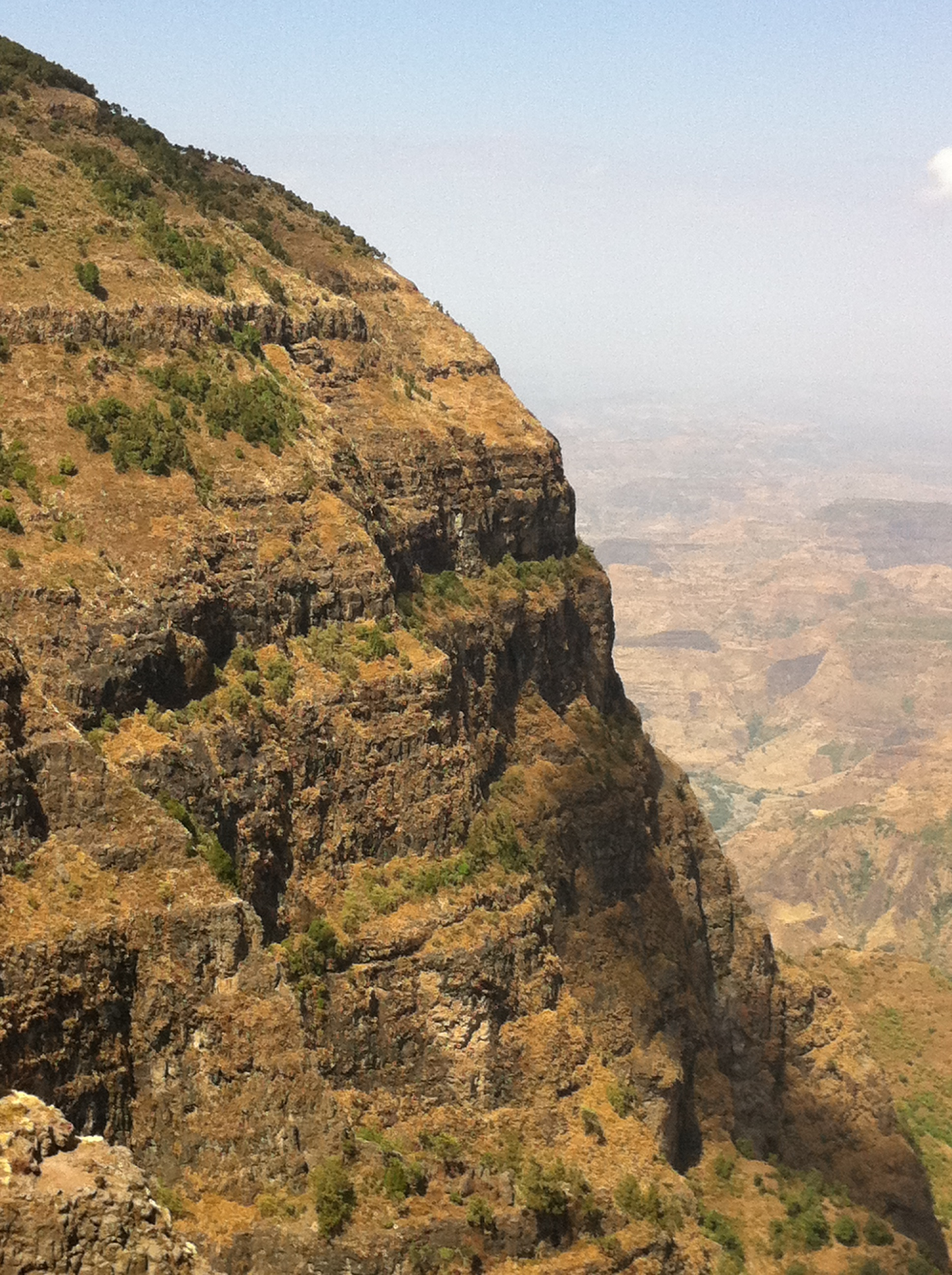
Paleogene flood basalts on the Ethiopian Plateau with the Afar Depression in the background.

=== Red Sea and East Africa ===
Extensional stresses from the subduction zone along the northern Neotethys resulted in rifting between Africa and Arabia, forming the Gulf of Aden in the late Eocene. To the west, in the early Oligocene, flood basalts erupted across Ethiopia, northeast Sudan and southwest Yemen as the Afar mantle plume began to impact the base of the African lithosphere. Rifting across the southern Red Sea began in the mid Oligocene, and across the central and northern Red Sea regions in the late Oligocene and early Miocene.

== Climate ==
Climatic conditions varied considerably during the Paleogene. After the disruption of the Chicxulub impact settled, a period of cool and dry conditions continued from the Late Cretaceous. At the Paleocene-Eocene boundary global temperatures rose rapidly with the onset of the Paleocene-Eocene Thermal Maximum (PETM). By the middle Eocene, temperatures began to drop again and by the late Eocene (c. 37 Ma) had decreased sufficiently for ice sheets to form in Antarctica. The global climate entered icehouse conditions at the Eocene-Oligocene boundary and the present day Late Cenozoic ice age began.

The Paleogene began with the brief but intense "impact winter" caused by the Chicxulub impact, which was followed by an abrupt period of warming. After temperatures stabilised, the steady cooling and drying of the Late Cretaceous-Early Paleogene Cool Interval that had spanned the last two ages of the Late Cretaceous continued, with only the brief interruption of the Latest Danian Event (c. 62.2 Ma) when global temperatures rose. There is no evidence for ice sheets at the poles during the Paleocene.

The relatively cool conditions were brought to an end by the Thanetian Thermal Event, and the beginning of the PETM. This was one of the warmest times of the Phanerozoic eon, during which global mean surface temperatures increased to 31.6 °C. According to a study published in 2018, from about 56 to 48 Ma, annual air temperatures over land and at mid-latitude averaged about 23–29 °C (± 4.7 °C). For comparison, this was 10 to 15 °C higher than the current annual mean temperatures in these areas.

This rapid rise in global temperatures and intense greenhouse conditions were due to a sudden increase in levels of atmospheric carbon dioxide (CO_{2}) and other greenhouse gases. An accompanying rise in humidity is reflected in an increase in kaolinite in sediments, which forms by chemical weathering in hot, humid conditions. Tropical and subtropical forests flourished and extended into polar regions. Water vapour (a greenhouse gas) associated with these forests also contributed to the greenhouse conditions.

The initial rise in global temperatures was related to the intrusion of magmatic sills into organic-rich sediments during volcanic activity in the North Atlantic Igneous Province, between about 56 and 54 Ma, which rapidly released large amounts of greenhouse gases into the atmosphere. This warming led to melting of frozen methane hydrates on continental slopes adding further greenhouses gases. It also reduced the rate of burial of organic matter as higher temperatures accelerated the rate of bacterial decomposition which released CO_{2} back into the oceans.

The (relatively) sudden climatic changes associated with the PETM resulted in the extinction of some groups of fauna and flora and the rise of others. For example, with the warming of the Arctic Ocean, around 70% of deep sea foraminifera species went extinct, whilst on land many modern mammals, including primates, appeared. Fluctuating sea levels meant, during low stands, a land bridge formed across the Bering Straits between North America and Eurasia allowing the movement of land animals between the two continents.

The PETM was followed by the less severe Eocene Thermal Maximum 2 (c. 53.69 Ma), and the Eocene Thermal Maximum 3 (c. 53 Ma). The early Eocene warm conditions were brought to an end by the Azolla event. This change of climate at about 48.5 Ma, is believed to have been caused by a proliferation of aquatic ferns from the genus Azolla, resulting in the sequestering of large amounts of CO_{2} from the atmosphere by the plants. From this time until about 34 Ma, there was a slow cooling trend known as the Middle-Late Eocene Cooling. As temperatures dropped at high latitudes the presence of cold water diatoms suggests sea ice was able to form in winter in the Arctic Ocean, and by the late Eocene (c. 37 Ma) there is evidence of glaciation in Antarctica.

Changes in deep ocean currents, as Australia and South America moved away from Antarctica opening the Drake and Tasmanian passages, were responsible for the drop in global temperatures. The warm waters of the South Atlantic, Indian and South Pacific oceans extended southward into the opening Southern Ocean and became part of the cold circumpolar current. Dense polar waters sank into the deep oceans and moved northwards, reducing global ocean temperatures. This cooling may have occurred over less than 100,000 years and resulted in a widespread extinction in marine life. By the Eocene-Oligocene boundary, sediments deposited in the ocean from glaciers indicate the presence of an ice sheet in western Antarctica that extended to the ocean.

The development of the circumpolar current led to changes in the oceans, which in turn reduced atmospheric CO_{2} further. Increasing upwellings of cold water stimulated the productivity of phytoplankton, and the cooler waters reduced the rate of bacterial decay of organic matter and promoted the growth of methane hydrates in marine sediments. This created a positive feedback cycle where global cooling reduced atmospheric CO_{2} and this reduction in CO_{2} lead to changes which further lowered global temperatures. The decrease in evaporation from the cooler oceans also reduced moisture in the atmosphere and increased aridity. By the early Oligocene, the North American and Eurasian tropical and subtropical forests were replaced by dry woodlands and widespread grasslands.

The Early Oligocene Glacial Maximum lasted for about 200,000 years, and the global mean surface temperature continued to decrease gradually during the Rupelian. A drop in global sea levels during the mid Oligocene indicates major growth of the Antarctic glacial ice sheet. In the Late Oligocene, global temperatures began to warm slightly, though they continued to be significantly lower than during the previous epochs of the Paleogene and polar ice remained.

== Flora and fauna ==
Restoration of Palaeotherium, which diversified in warmer climates

Tropical taxa diversified faster than those at higher latitudes after the Cretaceous–Paleogene extinction event, resulting in the development of a significant latitudinal diversity gradient.

Mammals began a rapid diversification during this period. After the Cretaceous–Paleogene extinction event, which saw the demise of the non-avian dinosaurs, mammals began to evolve from a few small and generalized forms into most of the modern varieties we see presently. Some of these mammals evolved into large forms that dominated the land, while others became capable of living in marine, specialized terrestrial, and airborne environments. Those that adapted to the oceans became modern cetaceans and sirenians, while those that adapted to trees became animals such as Sciuridaes or primates, the group to which humans belong.

Birds, extant dinosaurs which were already well established by the end of the Cretaceous, also experienced adaptive radiation as they took over the skies left empty by the now extinct pterosaurs. Some flightless birds such as penguins, ratites, and terror birds also filled niches left by the hesperornithes and other extinct dinosaurs.

Myctophids first appeared in the Late Palaeocene or Early Eocene, and during the Eocene and most of the Oligocene were restricted to shelf seas before expanding their range into the open ocean during the warm climatic interval at the end of the Oligocene.

Pronounced cooling in the Oligocene resulted in a massive floral shift, and many extant modern plants arose during this time. Grasses and herbs, such as Artemisia, began to proliferate, at the expense of tropical plants, which began to decrease. Conifer forests developed in mountainous areas. This cooling trend continued, with major fluctuation, until the end of the Pleistocene period. This evidence for this floral shift is found in the palynological record.

== See also ==
- Cretaceous–Paleogene boundary – Geological boundary between time periods
