= DSDP 368 =

Coordinates: 17°30′4″N 21°21′2″W

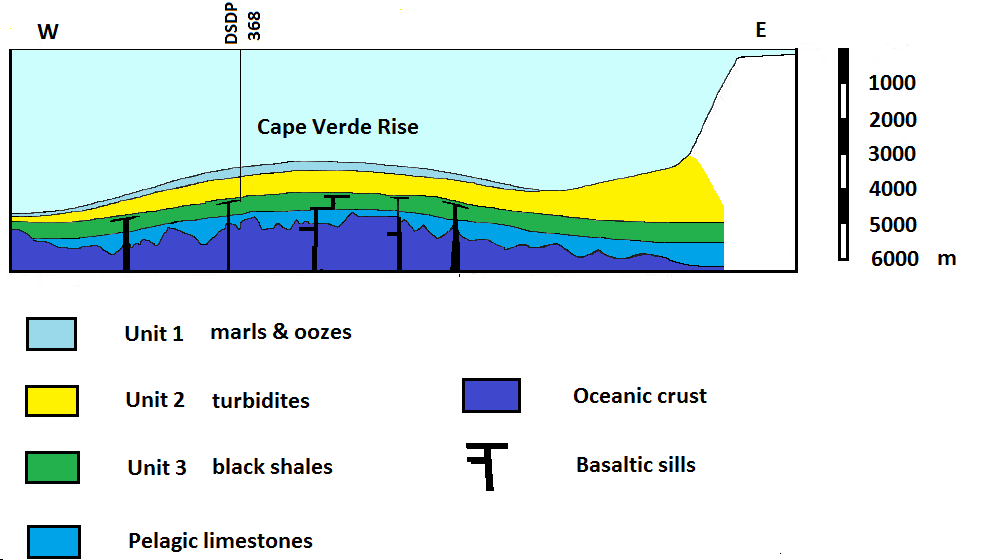
Geological description of the Cape Verde Rise at the DSDP 368 area

The DSDP 368 was an area that was drilled as part of the Deep Sea Drilling Project that took place below the Cape Verde Rise.

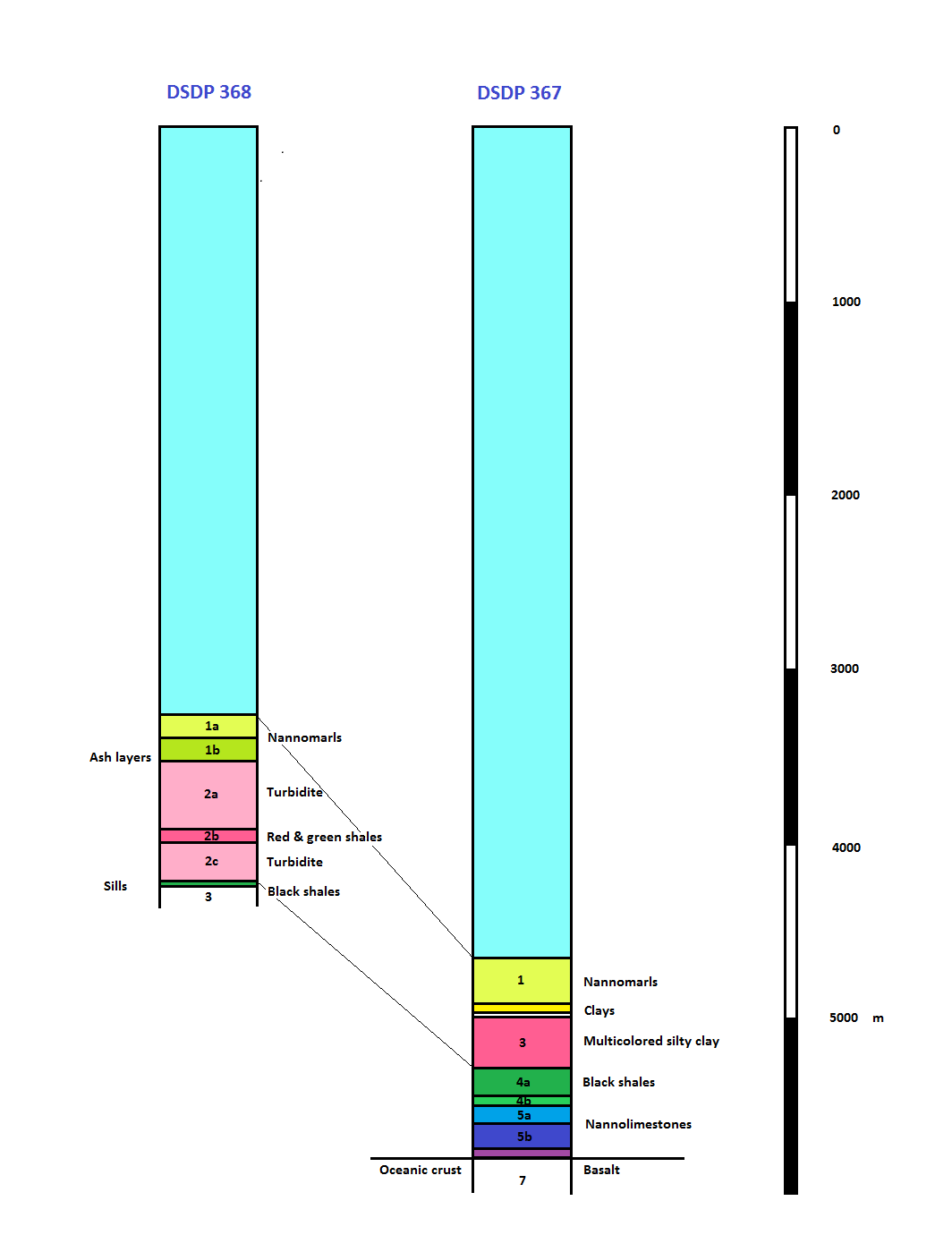
DSDP profiles of 367 and 368

== Location ==
The area was drilled from March 13 to 20, 1975 by the ship Glomar Challenger. Its location was at 17°30.4'N and, 21°21.2'W and is located 200 km northeast of the island of Sal and 600 km west of Nouakchott. The seabed is 3,366 meters deep. The drilling carried a total of 984.5 meters of sediment.

== Stratigraphy ==
At the ocean floor and below consists of several layers including nanomarls (1a) and ash layers (ib), a larger layer below consists of turbidite at 2a and 2c, in the middle are red and green shales (2b) and below consists of black shales (3). Below is the oceanic crust in which unlike DSDP 367 which had drilled into, DSDP 368 did not.

== Fossil content ==
Not including benthic and planktonic materials. There are types of nanoplanktons.

=== Foraminifers ===
Planktonic foraminifers are found at around 200 meters below the ocean floor, they include:

- N 22 – Holocene and Pleistocene: Globorotalia fimbriata, Globorotalia truncatolinoides, Globorotalia crassaformis viola.
- N 19 – Pliocene (Zanclean): Globorotalia margaritae evoluta, Globorotalia margaritae margaritae.
- N 17 – Miocene (Messinian/Tortonian): Globorotalia plesiotumida, Globorotalia acostaensis.
- N 15 – Miocene (Tortonian): Globorotalia continuosa.
- N 14 – Miocene (Tortonian): Globorotalia nepenthes.

=== Coccoliths ===
Coccoliths are founded up to 250 meters below the ocean floor, the drilling area, they include:

- NN 21 and NN 20 – Holocene and Pleistocene: Emiliana huxleyi, Gephyrocapsa oceanica.
- NN 19 – Pleistocene: Pseudomiliania lacunosa.
- NN 11 – Miocene: (Messinian): Discoaster quinqueramus.
- NN 9 – Miocene: (Tortonian): Discoaster hamatus.
- NN 5 – Miocene: (Langhian): Sphenolithus heteromorphus.

=== Radiolaria ===
Several radiolaria were made during the Late Pleistocene, Early Miocene and Early Eocene periods:

- RN 17/RN 15 – Late Pleistocene: Axoprunum angelinum, Eucyrtidium calvertense, Lamprocyrtis hannai, Lamprocyclas maritalis maritalis, Lamprocyclas haysi, Pterocanium trilobum und Ommatartus tetrathalamus.
- RN 4 – Burdigalian: Calocycletta costata.
- RN 3 – Burdigalian: Stichocorys wolffii.
- Early Eocene: Phormocyrtis striata striata.

== Geological development ==
In the area of the drilling, its geology is between 149 and 145 million years old.
