= Globigerinoidea =

Globigerinoidea Temporal range: Eocene - Holocene
- Rendering of Globigerina bulloides with defensive spines

Scientific classification
- Domain: Eukaryota
- Clade: Diaphoretickes
- Clade: SAR
- Clade: Rhizaria
- Phylum: Retaria
- Subphylum: Foraminifera
- Class: Globothalamea
- Order: Globigerinida
- Superfamily: Globigerinoidea; Carpenter et al., 1862

Families
- Globigerinidae Carpenter et al., 1862; Hastigerinidae Bolli, Loeblich & Tappan, 1957

Superfamily of foraminifers

Globigerinoidea is a superfamily of free-living, calcareous, planktonic foraminiferal protists that have lived in the open ocean since the Eocene. It is part of the suborder Globigerinina.

Tests are trochospiral but later chambers may be enveloping. walls are perforate with numerous small pores or fewer larger ones and the surface may be covered with narrow elongate monocrystalline spines. Apertures vary in position from interiomarginal to equatorial and may be relatively large. Secondary apertures along the sutures may also be found. Two families are included, the Globigerinidae and Hastigerinidae.

The Globigerinacea, sensu Loeblich and Tappan, 1988, is essentially the Globigerinidae of Loeblich and Tappan, 1964, even though reduced in size. The Globigerinidae (L&T 1964) has a longer range, extending from the Late Cretaceous (Maastrichtian) because of the inclusion of Globorotalioides which has been moved to the Globorataliacea as Eoglobiberina. Four subfamilies are included in the Globigerinidae (L&T 1964), the Globigerininae, Sphaeroidinellinae, Capsydracinae, and Obitoidinae. The Globigerinindae is now the Globigerinidae as emended. The Sphaeroidinellinae have been incorporated into the Globigerininae, sensu Loeblich and Tappan 1988. The Capsydracinae and Obitoidinae have been removed to the Globorotaliacea, respectively as the Capsydrancidae and Candeinidae.
