= Cadamosto Seamount =

Seamount in the North Atlantic Ocean southwest off the island of Brava, Cape Verde

Cadamosto
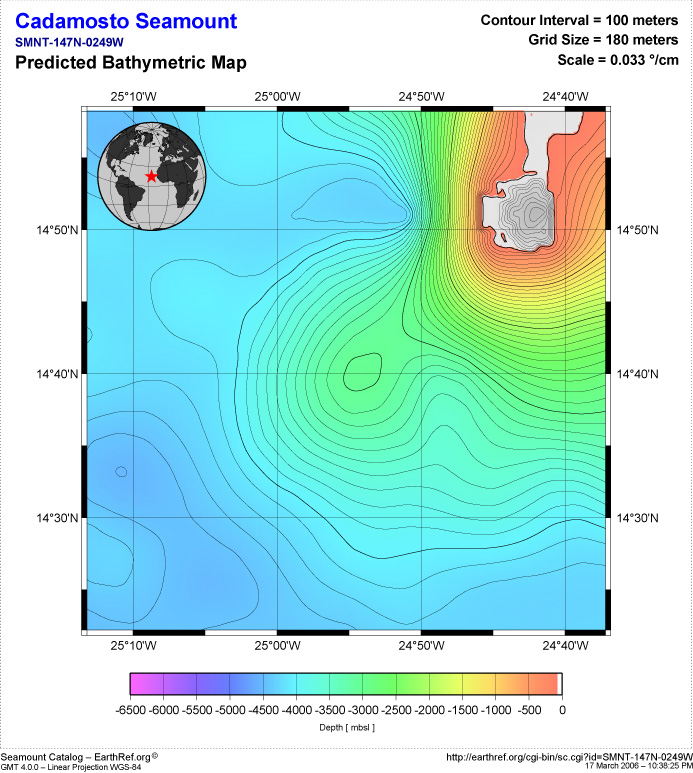
- Bathymetric map

Highest point
- Elevation: −1,480 m (−4,860 ft)
- Listing: Seamounts
- Coordinates: 14°30′N 25°00′W

Geography
- Location within Cape Verde
- Location: 25 km southwest of Brava, Cape Verde

Geology
- Mountain type: Stratovolcano
- Last eruption: unknown

Cadamosto Seamount is a seamount in the Cape Verde islands, 25 kilometres (16 mi) southwest of Brava. It rises to a depth of 1,380 metres (4,530 ft) and partially overlaps with Brava. The seamount appears to be one of the recently active volcanic centres of the Cape Verde islands and has produced phonolite. The seamount has had intense volcanic eruptions in the late Pleistocene, and recent seismic activity indicates that volcanism is ongoing.

== Geography and geomorphology ==
Cadamosto Seamount lies about 25 kilometres (16 mi) southwest of the island of Brava in the Cape Verde islands and within the Cabo Verde exclusive economic zone. Its name refers to Alvise Cadamosto, who discovered the Cape Verde islands in 1456.

The seamount is c. 15 kilometres (9.3 mi) wide at its foot and partially overlaps with Brava. Cadamosto and Brava may be part of a larger northeast-southwest trending alignment of volcanoes. It rises from a depth of 4,000 metres (13,000 ft) to about 1,380 metres (4,530 ft) depth and has a summit with three separate, well-preserved volcanic centres. Sediment cover is sparse and there is evidence of hydrothermal alteration and of recent activity in the form of spatter deposits. Agglutinates and lavas form most of the seamount, with sheet and pillow lavas cropping out in the summit region, some hydrothermally altered. Numerous craters and small volcanic cones dot its flanks which bear evidence of sector collapses.

== Geology ==
The Cape Verde islands lie about 500 kilometres (310 mi) west of Senegal and feature nine main islands, as well as a number of islets and seamounts. (Note: Among the seamounts found in the Cape Verde islands are Sodade Seamount, Noroeste/Nola Seamount, Charles Darwin volcanic field, Nova Holanda/Senghor Seamount, Boa Vista Seamount, Cabo Verde Seamount, Maio Seamount, Sal de Maio Seamount and Cadamosto Seamount. There are also smaller volcanic cones associated with the islands.) Unusually for a hotspot volcanic system, Cape Verde has two separate chains of volcanoes. The islands lie on the Cape Verde Rise, a 130-to-150-million-year-old sector of seafloor covered by a 2-kilometre (1.2 mi) high volcanic plateau. The Rise is associated with a geoid anomaly and may have formed through the activity of a mantle plume/hotspot. On some islands, Jurassic seafloor is exposed.

The Cape Verde hotspot is responsible for volcanic activity in the Cape Verde islands. Owing to the slow movement of the African Plate, there is only little evidence of migrating volcanism. It appears that the oldest volcanism occurred 16–12 million years ago at Maio and Sal, while activity in the last 500,000 years has been concentrated at Fogo and Santo Antao at the western end of the Cape Verde islands. Of these, Fogo has displayed the most recent activity with eruptions during historical time such as in 1769, 1785, 1799, 1847, 1853, 1857, 1951, 1995 and 2014/2015, and marine records show evidence of past sub-Plinian and Plinian eruptions. However, a more intense seismic activity occurs at Brava, where it appears to correlate with eruptions on Fogo, and at Cadamosto Seamount which appears to have a different magma source. Based on plate motion models, the Cape Verde hotspot is expected to move southwestward, in the direction of Cadamosto Seamount, and may currently underlie Brava, Fogo and Cadamosto. Apart from Cadamosto Seamount, Nola and Sodade Seamounts are also seismically active.

Unlike the rest of the Cape Verde islands which have mainly erupted mafic rocks, Cadamosto Seamount and Brava feature felsic rocks. The dominant volcanic rock is phonolite and phonotephrite although clinopyroxene nephelinite has also been recorded. Volcanic samples dredged from Cadamosto Seamount contain crystals of aegirine, apatite, augite, biotite, diopside, haüyne, iron-titanium oxides, leucite, nepheline, nosean, pyrite, sanidine, sodalite and titanite. Calcite, clay and iron oxyhydroxides formed through the alteration of volcanic rocks by seawater.

The genesis of the magmas erupted by Cadamosto Seamount involves the ascent of mantle melts into the crust, where storage and clinopyroxene crystallization take place. Only small amounts of crustal material and sediments are absorbed by the ascending magma, but mixing of the felsic magma with more mafic one has been inferred from dredged volcanic rocks. The formation of the phonolitic magma might take place within large magma chambers.

== Eruption history ==
Ages of crystals found in dredge samples indicate that the magmatic system of Cadamosto Seamount is about 1.52 million years old. Dredged rocks themselves have yielded ages of 97,000 ± 14,000, 51,800 ± 2,400 and 21,140 ± 620 years by argon-argon dating. Volcanic activity appears to have been influenced by sea level variations, with eruptions occurring during the Last Glacial Maximum when sea levels were lower.

Despite its great depth, Cadamosto Seamount appears to be capable of large explosive eruptions. Tephra layers attributed to Cadamosto Seamount are about 40,000 and 17,000 years old. These eruptions produced a minimum volume of 0.12 cubic kilometres (0.029 cu mi) and 0.21 cubic kilometres (0.050 cu mi) tephra, respectively, equivalent of category 4 on the volcanic explosivity index. The eruptions dispersed volcanic ash over areas of 3,100 square kilometres (1,200 sq mi) and 3,850 square kilometres (1,490 sq mi), respectively, through submarine volcanic ash plumes.

There is no indication of historical activity but Cadamosto Seamount is the most seismically active seamount on the Cape Verde Rise. During the 21st century, earthquakes with intensities of over mb 4 have been recorded at Cadamosto Seamount. The seismic activity may be related to the movement of magma in dykes, a magmatic system spanning Cadamosto, Brava and Fogo, and to a normal fault system between Brava and Cadamosto Seamount. The volcanic activity at Cadamosto Seamount may presage the future formation of a new island there. This might take up to 100,000 years.

== Life ==
Coral gardens and sponges grow on Cadamosto Seamount and are populated by crabs, fish and other animals. Several separate communities have been identified: The first is dominated by porifera with subordinate shrimp and octocorals, the second is mostly cnidarians with octocorals and scleractinians, the third is formed by coral gardens made up of scleractinians, the fourth by ophiuroids, the fifth consists of populations of sponges and octocorals and the sixth of brittle stars; the same study predicted the occurrences of other communities also on Cadamosto. The diversity is driven by different nutrient availabilities on the northern and southern side of Cadamosto.
