= Truncorotaloididae =

Truncorotaloididae Temporal range: Paleocene - Late Eocene

Scientific classification
- Domain: Eukaryota
- Clade: Sar
- Clade: Rhizaria
- Phylum: Retaria
- Subphylum: Foraminifera
- Class: Globothalamea
- Order: Rotaliida
- Suborder: Globigerinina
- Superfamily: Globorotalioidea
- Family: †Truncorotaloididae; Loeblich & Tappan, 1961

Genera
- see text

Family of single-celled organisms

Truncorotaloididae is a family of foraminifera belonging to the superfamily Globorotalioidea in the suborder Globigerinina and the order Rotaliida. It is found in marine sediments from the middle Paleocene to the upper Eocene.

== Genera ==
The family contains the following genera:

- Acarinina
- Astrorotalia
- Igorina
- Morozovella
- Morozovelloides
- Planorotalites
- Praemurica
- Testacarinata
