= Cape Verde Rise =

Prominence on the Atlantic Ocean surface

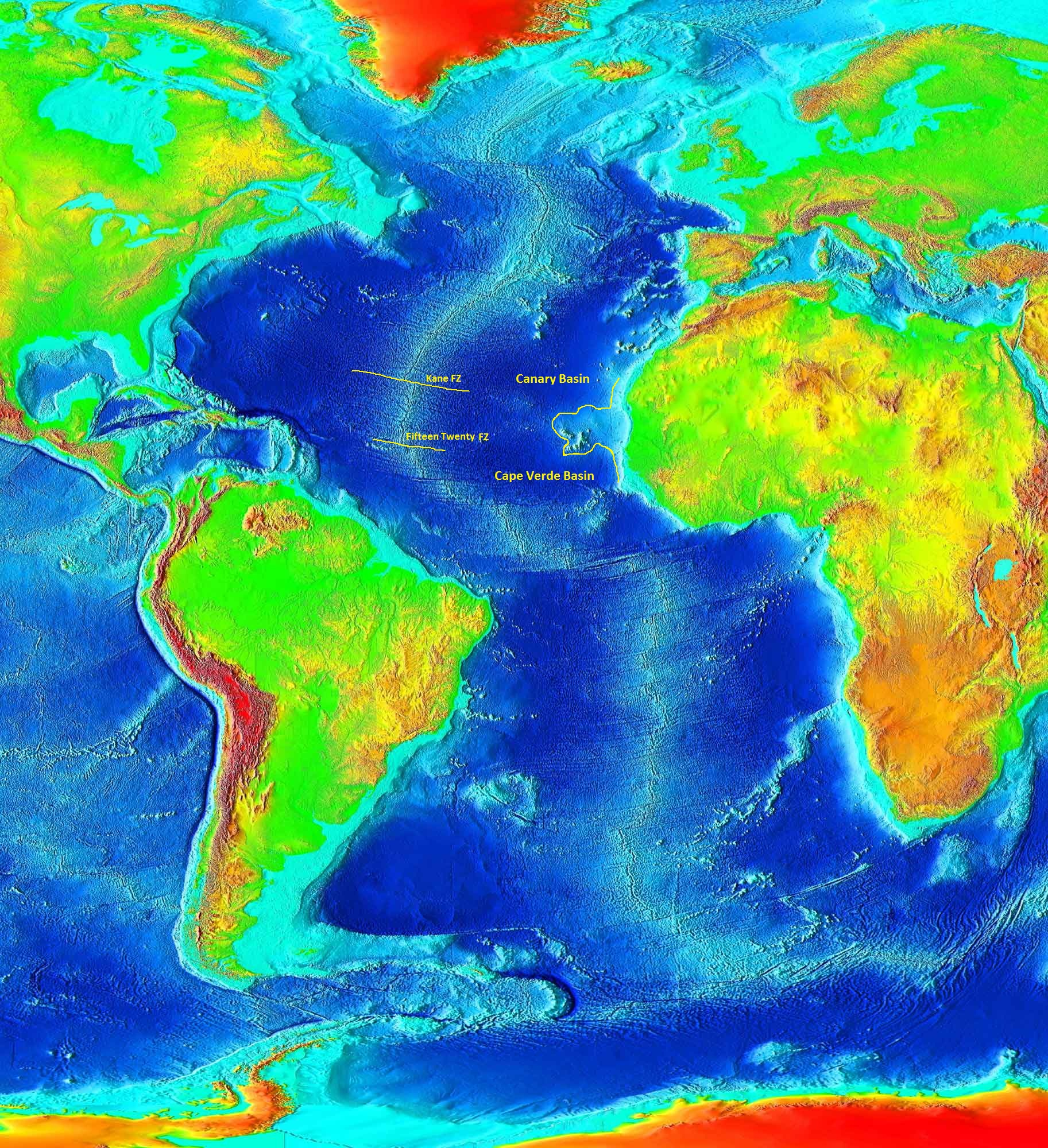
Map of the Atlantic Ocean featuring the Cape Verde Rise

The Cape Verde Rise is an oceanic feature that includes the Cape Verde Islands and the areas north and east of the islands and west of the African Continental Shelf as well as Mauritania and Senegal.

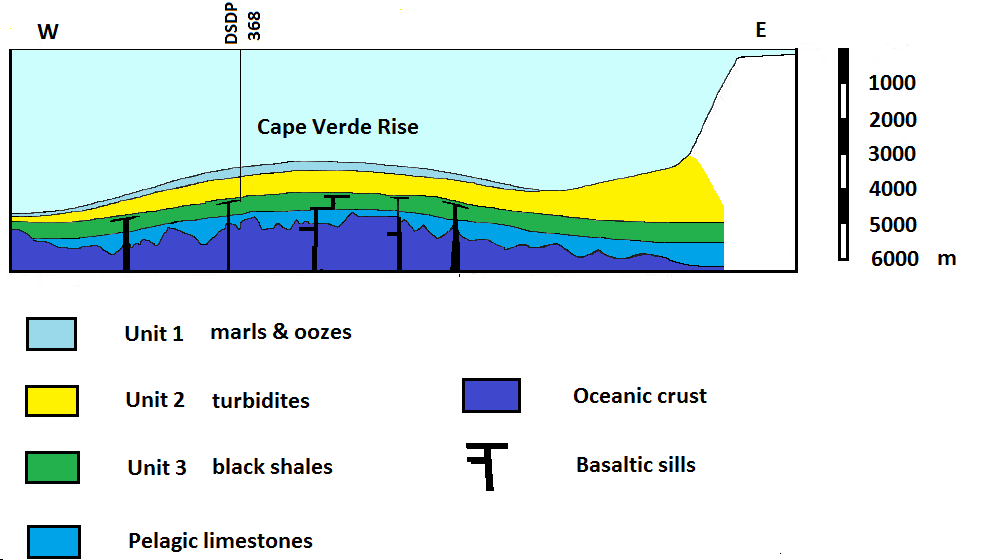
Description of the Cape Verde Rise at DSDP 368 area

== Geography ==
The rise are bounded by the Canary Basin to the north and the Cape Verde Basin to the south. Numerous seamounts are located in the rise including the Cape Verde (or Cabo Verde) (Latin: sometimes as Extracapitis being off the cape), Cadamosto, Boa Vista, Nola and Senghor. The third and fourth are named after explorers of Cape Verde, the other, the founding father of Senegal. The highest point is 2,220 meters below sea level and the deepest is in the range of over 3,000 meters deep. In the east end of the rise is the Dakar Canyon. It ranges between the 14 and the 22° parallels north and is 900 km long. Near the rise is the westernmost point in Africa, Cap-Vert, northwest of the rise is the Santo Antão Ridge.

In the waters above the Cape Verde Rise is the Canary (or Canarian) Current to the north and the Equatorial Atlantic Current around the south of the rise.

Nola Seamount may be the tallest seamount within Cape Verde with its elevation ranging from 60–70 meters deep, and probably the Cape Verde Rise.

== Fracture zones ==
Over 1,500 km west of the rise are two fracture zones located at the Mid-Atlantic Ridge, the Kane, the Fifteen-Twenty and Jacksonville.

In the rise there are 13 smaller fracture zones, three extends as far as the Cape Verde Basin and another extends north into the Canary Basin and within the Canary Islands.

== Deep sea exploration ==
In the course of the Deep Sea Drilling Project and the Ocean Drilling Program, two research drillings were done so far, the DSDP 368 and the ODP 659. At the DSDP 368 location which was drilled 985 meters deep, it is divided into three units, the first unit composes of marls and oozes, the second composes of turbidites and the third composes of black shales, they lie above pelagic limestones and the oceanic crust. In that area are five basaltic sills. DSDP 368 is east of the island of Boa Vista.

== Geology ==
The oldest rocks date back to 155 million years ago during the Kimmeridgian era in the area what is now the east of the rise, around 131 to 128 million years ago, the seamounts of Maio and Santiago were formed, at the time they were closer to the Mid-Atlantic Ridge. The spreading rate was slow and moved a centimeter a year.

Between 15 and 7 million years ago, they were volcanically active. Its only volcanic activities in the basin are in Fogo, Brava and the Cadamosto Seamount. Brava's last eruption was in the Holocene era.

== Fauna ==
In the waters above the rise, eighteen species of whales and dolphins have been recorded in the waters of the Cape Verde archipelago. The area is cited as one of two known breeding grounds for the humpback whale (Megaptera novaeangliae) of the Northern Hemisphere. Humpback whales migrate annually from the North Sea to winter around Cape Verde from January to mid-May. The humpback whale population became limited due to severe overfishing during the 19th century and, although the total North Atlantic population of humpbacks had rebounded to more than 10,000 individuals by 1993, the Cape Verde population remained uncertain as of 2009.

Molluscs (Mollusks) in the deep waters within the Cape Verde islands include Tiberia apicifusca at depths between 273 m and 970 m below sea level.
