= Loeblichella =

Loeblichella Temporal range: Late Cretaceous

Scientific classification
- Domain: Eukaryota
- Clade: Sar
- Clade: Rhizaria
- Phylum: Retaria
- Subphylum: Foraminifera
- Class: Globothalamea
- Order: Rotaliida
- Family: †Globotruncanidae
- Genus: †Loeblichella; Pessagno, 1967

Species
- See text

Genus of single-celled organisms

Loeblichella is a genus of foraminifera belonging to the family Globotruncanidae of the superfamily Globotruncanoidea and the suborder Globigerinina. Its type species is Loeblichella hessi. The genus was named and first described by Pessagno in 1967. Its fossil range is the Late Cretaceous Period.

== Species ==
The genus Loeblichella contains four species:

- Loeblichella carteri
- Loeblichella coarctata
- Loeblichella convexa
- Loeblichella hessi
