= Globigerinelloides =

Globigerinelloides Temporal range: Early - Late Cretaceous (Aptian - Maastrichtian)

Scientific classification
- Domain: Eukaryota
- Clade: Sar
- Clade: Rhizaria
- Phylum: Retaria
- Subphylum: Foraminifera
- Class: Globothalamea
- Order: Rotaliida
- Family: †Globigerinelloididae
- Subfamily: †Globigerinelloidinae
- Genus: †Globigerinelloides; Cushman & ten Dam, 1948

Species
- See text

Extinct genus of single-celled organisms

Globigerinelloides is an extinct genus of planktonic foraminifera from the Cretaceous, belonging to the family Globigerinelloididae and the suborder Globigerinina. It was first described in 1948. The type taxon is Globigerinelloides algeriana.

== Species ==
Species in Globigerinelloides include:

- Globigerinelloides algeriana
- Globigerinelloides alvarezi
- Globigerinelloides aptiensis
- Globigerinelloides asper
- Globigerinelloides barri
- Globigerinelloides bentonensis
- Globigerinelloides blowi
- Globigerinelloides bollii
- Globigerinelloides caseyi
- Globigerinelloides clavatus
- Globigerinelloides douglasi
- Globigerinelloides duboisi
- Globigerinelloides ehrenbergi
- Globigerinelloides elongatus
- Globigerinelloides escheri
- Globigerinelloides ferreolensis
- Globigerinelloides gottisi
- Globigerinelloides gyroidinaeformis
- Globigerinelloides impensus
- Globigerinelloides irregularis
- Globigerinelloides lobatus
- Globigerinelloides maridalensis
- Globigerinelloides mendezensis
- Globigerinelloides messinae
- Globigerinelloides minai
- Globigerinelloides multispina
- Globigerinelloides paragottisi
- Globigerinelloides praevolutus
- Globigerinelloides prairiehillensis
- Globigerinelloides primitivus
- Globigerinelloides pulchellus
- Globigerinelloides sigali
- Globigerinelloides subcarinata
- Globigerinelloides tumidus
- Globigerinelloides ultramicrus
- Globigerinelloides volutus
- Globigerinelloides yaucoensis
