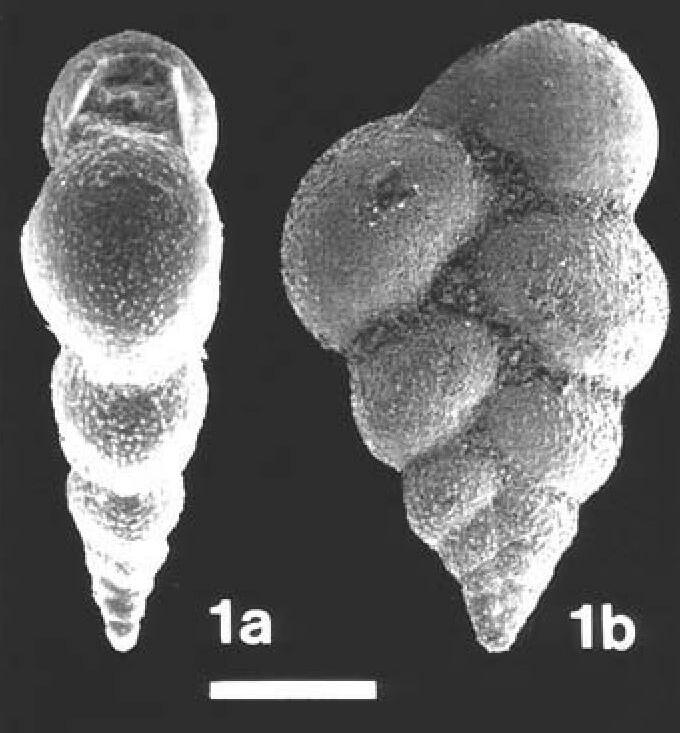
- Heterohelix glabrans

Scientific classification
- Domain: Eukaryota
- Clade: Diaphoretickes
- Clade: SAR
- Clade: Rhizaria
- Phylum: Retaria
- Subphylum: Foraminifera
- Class: Globothalamea
- Order: Rotaliida
- Suborder: Globigerinina
- Superfamily: Heterohelicoidea
- Family: Heterohelicidae; Cushman, 1927

Genera
- see text

= Heterohelicidae =

Heterohelicidae Temporal range: Early Cretaceous - present

Family of single-celled organisms

Heterohelicidae is a family of foraminifera belonging to the superfamily Heterohelicoidea and the suborder Globigerinina.

== Genera ==
The family Heterohelicidae consists of the following subfamilies and genera:

- Subfamily Gublerininae
  - Bifarina
  - Gublerina
  - Rectoguembelina
  - Sigalia
- Subfamily Heterohelicinae
  - Heterohelix
  - Laeviheterohelix
  - Lunatriella
  - Planoglobulina
  - Pseudoplanoglobulina
  - Pseudotextularia
  - Racemiguembelina
  - Spiroplecta
  - Steineckia
  - Ventilabrella
- Subfamily Pseudoguembelininae
  - Pseudoguembelina
  - Striataella
- not assigned to a subfamily
  - Braunella
  - Hartella
  - Huberella
  - Lipsonia
  - Parasigalia
  - Planoheterohelix
  - Praegublerina
  - Protoheterohelix
  - Zeauvigerina
