= Hedbergellidae =

Hedbergellidae Temporal range: Cretaceous

Scientific classification
- Domain: Eukaryota
- Clade: Diaphoretickes
- Clade: SAR
- Clade: Rhizaria
- Phylum: Retaria
- Subphylum: Foraminifera
- Class: Globothalamea
- Order: Rotaliida
- Suborder: Globigerinina
- Superfamily: †Rotaliporoidea
- Family: †Hedbergellidae; Loeblich & Tappan, 1961

Genera
- see text

Family of single-celled organisms

Hedbergellidae is an extinct family of foraminifera belonging to the superfamily Rotaliporoidea and the suborder Globigerinina.

== Genera ==
The family contains the following genera:

- Subfamily Hedbergellinae
  - Asterohedbergella
  - Costellagerina
  - Fingeria
  - Hedbergella
  - Hillsella
  - Liuenella
  - Rugohedbergella
  - Trochogerina
  - Whiteinella
- Subfamily Helvetoglobotruncaninae
  - Globocarinata
  - Helvetroglobotruncana
  - Unitruncatus
- Subfamily Rotundininae
  - Bermudeziana
  - Falsotruncana
  - Praeglobotruncana
- not assigned to a subfamily
  - Globanomalina
  - Microhedbergella
  - Muricohedbergella
  - Paracostellagerina
  - Paraticinella
  - Planoglobanomalina
  - Pseudoguembelitria
  - Pseudohastigerina
  - Turborotalia
  - Wondersella
