= Kane fracture zone =

Fracture zone on the Mid-Atlantic Ridge

The Kane fracture zone is a medium-offset transform fault zone located on the Mid-Atlantic Ridge (MAR). It lies just to the north of the Kane Megamullion, an oceanic core complex that forms the footwall of a long-lived low-angle detachment fault. The Mid-Atlantic Ridge near the Kane fracture zone (known as the MARK area) has been the focus of detailed scientific investigations, notably Expeditions 106 and 109 of the Ocean Drilling Program, as well as numerous other geological and geophysical studies.

The Kane fracture zone offsets the MAR left-laterally by 160 km (99 mi) at 24°N. Its fossil trace on the western side of the MAR stretches some 1,700 kn (3,100 km/h; 2,000 mph) westward to the 80 Ma isochron (anomaly 34). Major changes or bends along this trace occur at 52.5°W (anomaly 21–25, 53–63 Ma) and 55.5°W (anomaly 31, 72 Ma) are the results of major changes in spreading directions in the Central Atlantic Ocean.
