= Praeglobotruncana =

Praeglobotruncana Temporal range: Early Cretaceous - Late Cretaceous (Albian - Turonian)

Scientific classification
- Domain: Eukaryota
- Clade: Diaphoretickes
- Clade: SAR
- Clade: Rhizaria
- Phylum: Retaria
- Subphylum: Foraminifera
- Class: Globothalamea
- Order: Rotaliida
- Family: †Hedbergellidae
- Subfamily: †Rotundininae
- Genus: †Praeglobotruncana; Bermúdez, 1952

Species
- see text

Extinct genus of single-celled organisms

Praeglobotruncana is an extinct genus of foraminifera belonging to the family Hedbergellidae of the superfamily Rotaliporoidea and the suborder Globigerinina. Its type species is Praeglobotruncana delrioensis. Its fossil range is the Cretaceous Period.

== Species ==
Species in Praeglobotruncana include:

- Praeglobotruncana algeriana
- Praeglobotruncana alta
- Praeglobotruncana blanfordiana
- Praeglobotruncana bronnimanni
- Praeglobotruncana caryi
- Praeglobotruncana clotensis
- Praeglobotruncana compressa
- Praeglobotruncana delrioensis
- Praeglobotruncana fusani
- Praeglobotruncana gibba
- Praeglobotruncana hessi
- Praeglobotruncana hilalensis
- Praeglobotruncana inermis
- Praeglobotruncana kallakkudiensis
- Praeglobotruncana klausi
- Praeglobotruncana lehmanni
- Praeglobotruncana luzhanensis
- Praeglobotruncana novozealandica
- Praeglobotruncana oraviensis
- Praeglobotruncana primitiva
- Praeglobotruncana pseudoalgeriana
- Praeglobotruncana shirakinensis
- Praeglobotruncana stephani
- Praeglobotruncana svalavensis
- Praeglobotruncana turbinata
