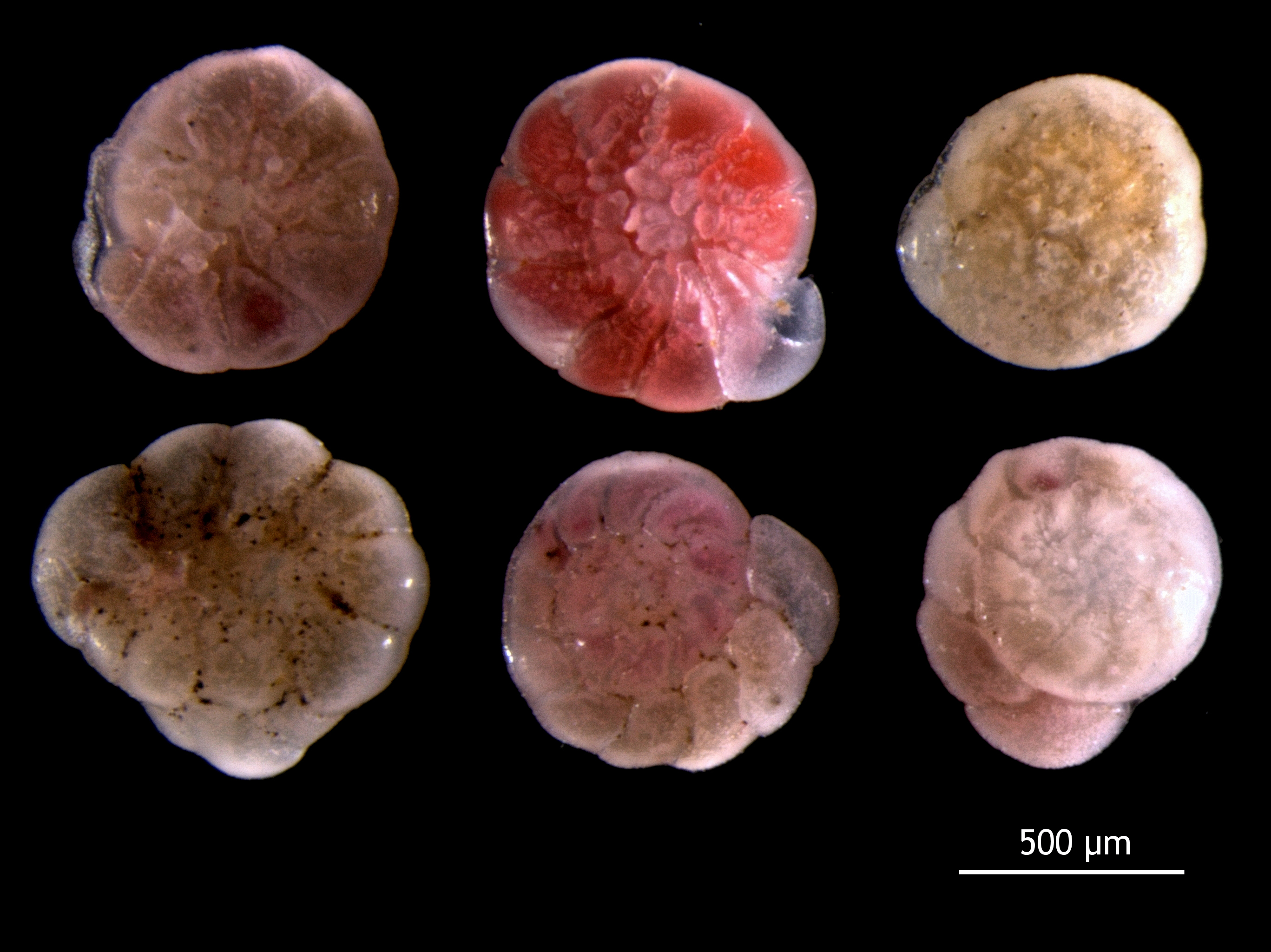
- Ammonia beccarii (Rotaliidae)

Scientific classification
- Domain: Eukaryota
- Clade: Sar
- Clade: Rhizaria
- Phylum: Retaria
- Subphylum: Foraminifera
- Class: Globothalamea
- Subclass: Rotaliana; Mikhalevich, 1980

Orders
- See text

= Rotaliana =

Rotaliana Temporal range: Triassic - Holocene

Subclass of single-celled organisms

Rotaliana is a subclass of benthic Foraminifera with multichambered tests of perforate hyaline calcite. Tests may be planospiral, low or high trochospiral, or serial. Interiors may be complex with secondary chambers and interconnecting canal systems. Rotaliana are separate from the planktonic Globigerinana although both have tests of similar composition. The Textulariana, which contains forms that are rather similar, differs in be agglutinated.

Sixteen orders are included (Mikhalevich, 1980) among which are the Asterigerinida, Bolivinitida, Discorbida, and Rotaliida. Loeblich and Tappan (1988), with Foraminifera an order, lists 24 superfamilies within the suborder Rotaliina, which are equivalent to or contained within the orders of the Rotaliina Mikhalevich.
