= Hantkeninoidea =

Hantkeninoidea Temporal range: Paleocene - Miocene

Scientific classification
- Domain: Eukaryota
- Clade: Diaphoretickes
- Clade: SAR
- Clade: Rhizaria
- Phylum: Retaria
- Subphylum: Foraminifera
- Class: Globothalamea
- Order: Rotaliida
- Suborder: Globigerinina
- Superfamily: Hantkeninoidea; Cushman, 1927

Families
- Hantkeninidae Cushman, 1927

Superfamily of single-celled organisms

Hantkeninoidea (Hantkeninacea in older classifications) is a superfamily of foraminifera with planispiral or enrolled biserial tests, found in marine sediments of Paleocene to Miocene age, in which chambers vary from globular to elongate and the primary aperture is equatorial in position. It contains one family, the Hantkeninidae.

Members of the Hantkeninacea were included in the family Hantkeninidae, established by Cushman, 1927, as defined in the Treatise, part C, 1964, which is accordingly included in the Globigerinacea, a superfamily in the foraminiferal suborder, Rotaliina.
