= Cassigerinellidae =

Cassigerinellidae Temporal range: Bartonian - Serravallian

Scientific classification
- Domain: Eukaryota
- Clade: Sar
- Clade: Rhizaria
- Phylum: Retaria
- Subphylum: Foraminifera
- Class: Globothalamea
- Order: †Guembelitriida
- Superfamily: †Cassigerinelloidea
- Family: †Cassigerinellidae; Bolli, Loeblich and Tappan, 1957

Family of single-celled organisms

Cassigerinellidae is an extinct family of foraminifera belonging to the superfamily Guembelitrioidea and the suborder Globigerinina.

== Genera ==
It includes the genera Cassigerinella and Riveroinella.
