= Heterohelicoidea =

Heterohelicoidea Temporal range: Early Cretaceous - Present (Aptian - present)

Scientific classification
- Domain: Eukaryota
- Clade: Diaphoretickes
- Clade: SAR
- Clade: Rhizaria
- Phylum: Retaria
- Subphylum: Foraminifera
- Class: Globothalamea
- Order: Rotaliida
- Suborder: Globigerinina
- Superfamily: Heterohelicoidea; Cushman, 1927

Families
- Heterohelicidae Cushman, 1927

Synonyms
- Heterohelicacea

Superfamily of single-celled organisms

Heterohelicoidea is a superfamily of middle Jurassic to Oligocene planktonic forams characterized by biserial or triserial tests, at least in the early stage, that may be reduced in the later stage but more commonly show chamber proliferation in the later stage. Aperture a low or high arch at the base of the final chamber or terminal in uniserial stage. Heterohelicoidea contains one family, the Heterohelicidae.
