= Globigerina bulloides =

Globigerina bulloides Temporal range: Eocene–Recent
- Rendering with spines

Scientific classification
- Domain: Eukaryota
- Clade: Sar
- Clade: Rhizaria
- Phylum: Retaria
- Subphylum: Foraminifera
- Class: Globothalamea
- Order: Rotaliida
- Family: Globigerinidae
- Genus: Globigerina
- Species: G. bulloides

Binomial name
- Globigerina bulloides d'Orbigny, 1826

Species of single-celled organism

Globigerina bulloides is a species of heterotrophic planktonic foraminifer with a wide distribution in the photic zone of the world's oceans. It is able to tolerate a range of sea surface temperatures, salinities and water densities, and is most abundant at high southern latitudes (up to 40° S), certain high northern latitudes (up to 80° N), and in low-latitude upwelling regions. The density or presence of G. bulloides may change as a function of phytoplankton bloom successions, and they are known to be most abundant during winter and spring months.

Like other planktonic foraminifera, G. bulloides carbonate tests found in marine sediments obtained from ocean cores can be used to reconstruct climatic histories, and to align marine sediment cores with one another or with astronomical cycles. In this vein, oxygen isotopic analyses of these forams from drill cores in the North Atlantic have helped precisely date the timing of the onset of northern hemisphere glaciations in the late Pliocene, 2.5–3 million years ago. Magnesium to calcium ratios are also used in G. bulloides to reconstruct temperature histories in the world's oceans, as experimental cultures of the foram have shown magnesium to calcium ratios to increase exponentially with increasing ocean temperature.

At one point in the 19th century, researchers of the life-histories of this genus came to the firm conclusion that these animals lived and died in the ooze in which they were found, many hundreds of feet below sea level. This has now proved to have been an incorrect assumption, despite the thoroughness of those investigations.
