= Rhabdammina =

Rhabdammina Temporal range: Late Oligocene - Present

Scientific classification
- Domain: Eukaryota
- (unranked): SAR
- (unranked): Rhizaria
- Superphylum: Retaria
- Phylum: Foraminifera
- Order: Textulariida
- Superfamily: Ammodiscoidea
- Family: Rhabdamminidae
- Genus: Rhabdammina Sars, 1869

Species
- Rhabdammina abyssorum Carpenter, 1869; Rhabdammina cornuta Fristedt, 1887; Rhabdammina discreta Arnesen, 1903; Rhabdammina linearis Brady, 1879; Rhabdammina triangularis Thiele, 1903

Genus of single-celled organisms

Rhabdammina is a genus in the family Rhabdamminidae of textulariid foraminifera. Rhabdammina species are vagile, inbenthos foraminiferans, usually found in deep sea regions with normal salinity.
