= Globorotalioidea =

Globorotalioidea Temporal range: Early Paleocene - Holocene

Scientific classification
- Domain: Eukaryota
- Supergroup: Rhizaria
- Phylum: Foraminifera
- Class: Globothalamea
- Order: Rotaliida
- Suborder: Globigerinina
- Superfamily: Globorotalioidea; Cushman, 1927

Families
- see text

Superfamily of single-celled organisms

The Globoroatioidea (Globorotaliacea in older classifications) constitutes a superfamily of Cenozoic planktonic foraminifera. It is part of the suborder Globigerinina. Globoroatioidea have trochospiral tests with rounded to carinate peripheries, the walls of which are of finely lamellar, perforate, of optically radial calcite, with an inner organic lining. The surface of these tests is smooth, lacking spines, but may be covered with pustules or pitted, and may have one or more large pores at the center. There is a single primary aperture that may be bordered by an imperforate lip, as well as possible supplementary apertures.

Families included in the Globoroatioidea, in temporal sequence, as per Loeblich and Tappan, 1988, are the:

- Eoglobigerinidae L. Paleocene (L. Danian)
- Truncorotaloididae M. Paleocene to U.Eocene
- Catapsydracidae Paleocene to Holocene
- Globorotaliidae Paleocene to Holocene
- Candeinidae M. Eocene to Holocene
- Pulleniatinidae M. Miocene to Holocene

Earlier, Loeblich and Tappan, 1964, in the Treatise on Invertebrate Paleontology, Part C, in which foraminiferal taxa are ranked as an Order rather than as a Class, the equivalent Globorataliidae included only the subfamilies Globorotaliinae and Truncorotaliinae. The other four families now included in the Globorotaliacea are based on taxa that were included in the Globigerinidae.
