= Globigerinina =

Globigerinina Temporal range: Toarcian–Recent

Scientific classification
- Domain: Eukaryota
- Clade: Sar
- Clade: Rhizaria
- Phylum: Retaria
- Subphylum: Foraminifera
- Class: Globothalamea
- Subclass: Rotaliana
- Order: Rotaliida
- Suborder: Globigerinina; Delage & Hérouard, 1896

Superfamilies
- Globigerinitoidea Bermúdez, 1961; Globigerinoidea Carpenter et al., 1862; Globorotalioidea Cushman, 1927; Globotruncanoidea Brotzen, 1942; Guembelitrioidea Montanaro Gallitelli, 1957; Hantkeninoidea Cushman, 1927; Heterohelicoidea Cushman, 1927; Planomalinoidea Bolli et al., 1957; Rotaliporoidea Sigal, 1958

Suborder of single-celled organisms

The Globigerinina is a suborder of foraminiferans that are found as marine plankton. They produce hyaline calcareous tests, and are known as fossils from the Jurassic Period onwards. The group has included more than 100 genera and over 400 species, of which about 30 species are extant. One of the most important genera is Globigerina; vast areas of the ocean floor are covered with Globigerina ooze (named by Murray and Renard in 1873), dominated by the shells of planktonic forms.

== Description ==
Globigerinids are characterized by distinctly perforate planispiral or trochospiral tests composed of lamellar radial hyaline (glassy) calcite, with typically globular chambers and single interiomarginal aperture. Some however have multiple or auxiliary apertures, and in some the aperture is areal or terminal in location. Some, also, have keels, reinforcing thickenings along exterior angles. An adaptation to the planktonic habit is the development of long narrow spines that support a frothy buoyant ectoplasm.

== Superfamilies and families ==
The Globigerinina are now divided into these superfamilies and families:

- superfamily Globigerinitoidea Bermúdez, 1961
  - family Globigerinitidae Bermúdez, 1961
- superfamily Globigerinoidea Carpenter et al., 1862
  - family Globigerinidae Carpenter & al., 1862
  - family Hastigerinidae Bolli, Loeblich & Tappan, 1957
- superfamily Globorotalioidea Cushman, 1927
  - family Candeinidae Cushman, 1927
  - family Catapsydracidae Bolli & al., 1957 †
  - family Eoglobigerinidae Blow, 1979 †
  - family Globorotaliidae Cushman, 1927
  - family Pulleniatinidae Cushman, 1927
  - family Truncorotaloididae Loeblich & Tappan, 1961 †
- superfamily Globotruncanoidea Brotzen, 1942 †
  - family Globotruncanidae Brotzen, 1942 †
  - family Rugoglobigerinidae Subbotina, 1959 †
- superfamily Guembelitrioidea Montanaro Gallitelli, 1957
  - family Cassigerinellidae Bolli & al., 1957 †
  - family Chiloguembelinidae Reiss, 1963
  - family Guembelitriidae Montanaro Gallitelli, 1957
- superfamily Hantkeninoidea Cushman, 1927
  - family Hantkeninidae Cushman, 1927 †
- superfamily Heterohelicoidea Cushman, 1927
  - family Heterohelicidae Cushman, 1927
- superfamily Planomalinoidea Bolli et al., 1957 †
  - family Globigerinelloididae Longoria, 1974 †
  - family Planomalinidae Bolli & al., 1957 †
  - family Schackoinidae Pokorny, 1958 †
- superfamily Rotaliporoidea Sigal, 1958 †
  - family Conoglobigerinidae Boudagher-Fadel et al., 1997 †
  - family Favusellidae Michael, 1973 †
  - family Globuligerinidae Loeblich & Tappan, 1984 †
  - family Hedbergellidae Loeblich & Tappan, 1961 †
  - family Praehedbergellidae Banner & Desai, 1988 †
  - family Rotaliporidae Sigal, 1958 †
  - family Sphaerogerinidae BouDagher-Fadel et al., 2012 †
