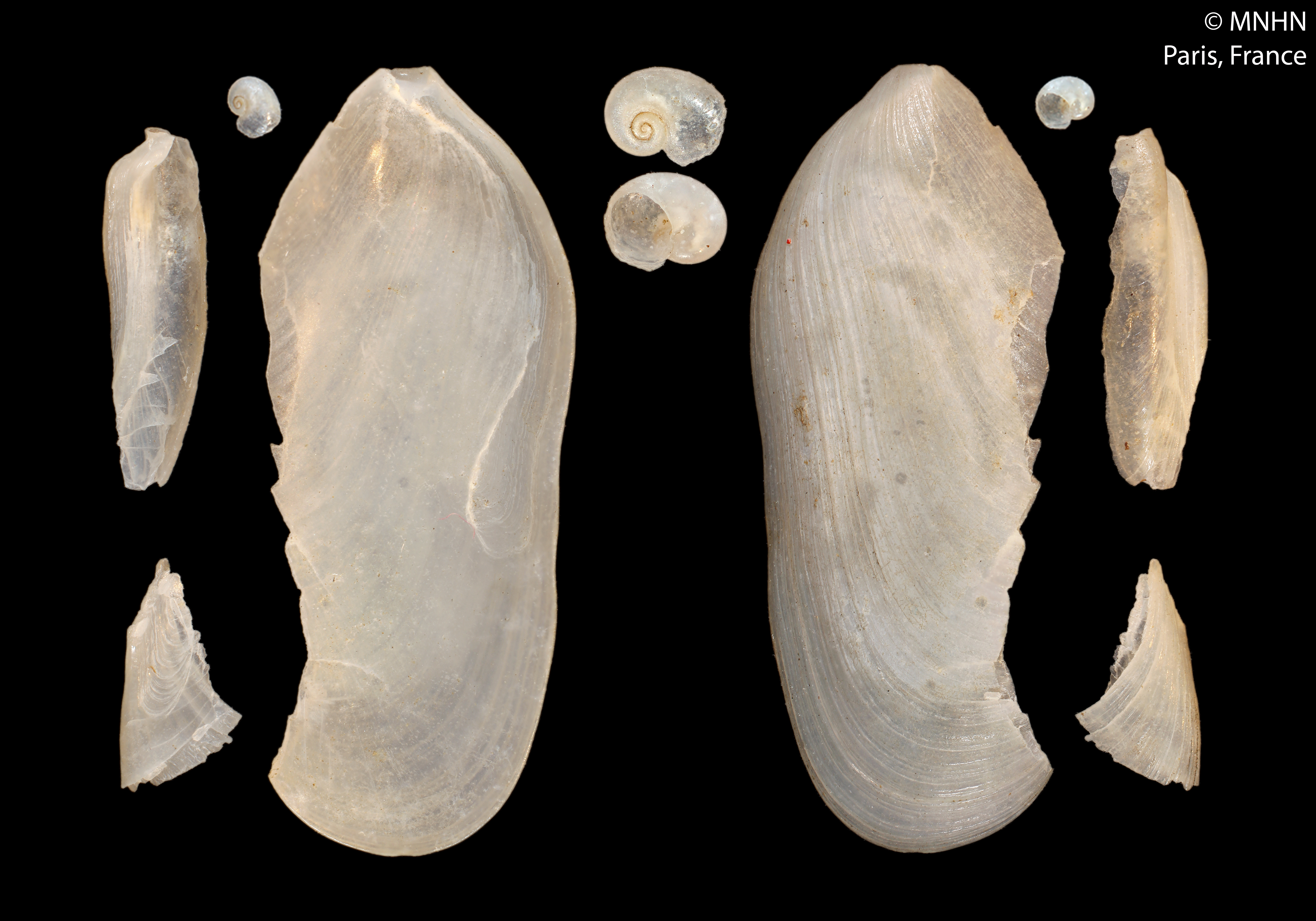

Scientific classification
- Kingdom: Animalia
- Phylum: Mollusca
- Class: Gastropoda
- Subclass: Caenogastropoda
- Order: Littorinimorpha
- Family: Naticidae
- Genus: Haliotinella
- Species: H. patinaria

Binomial name
- Haliotinella patinaria Guppy, 1876

Synonyms
- Berthella lowei (R. B. Watson, 1897); Pleurobranchus lowei R. B. Watson, 1897

= Haliotinella patinaria =

Species of gastropod

Haliotinella patinaria is a species of predatory sea snail, a marine gastropod mollusk in the family Naticidae, the moon snails.

== Distribution ==
This marine species occurs in the West Indies, off Saint Kitts; also off Trinidad.

== Description ==
The maximum recorded shell length varies between 16 m mm and 18 mm. It has a worm-like body with a small shell it cannot retract into, similar to its relative Sinum.

== Habitat ==
It has a minimum recorded depth is 0 m. Maximum recorded depth is 80 m.
