= Nuffield Gutty =

Prototype British Jeep-like military vehicle

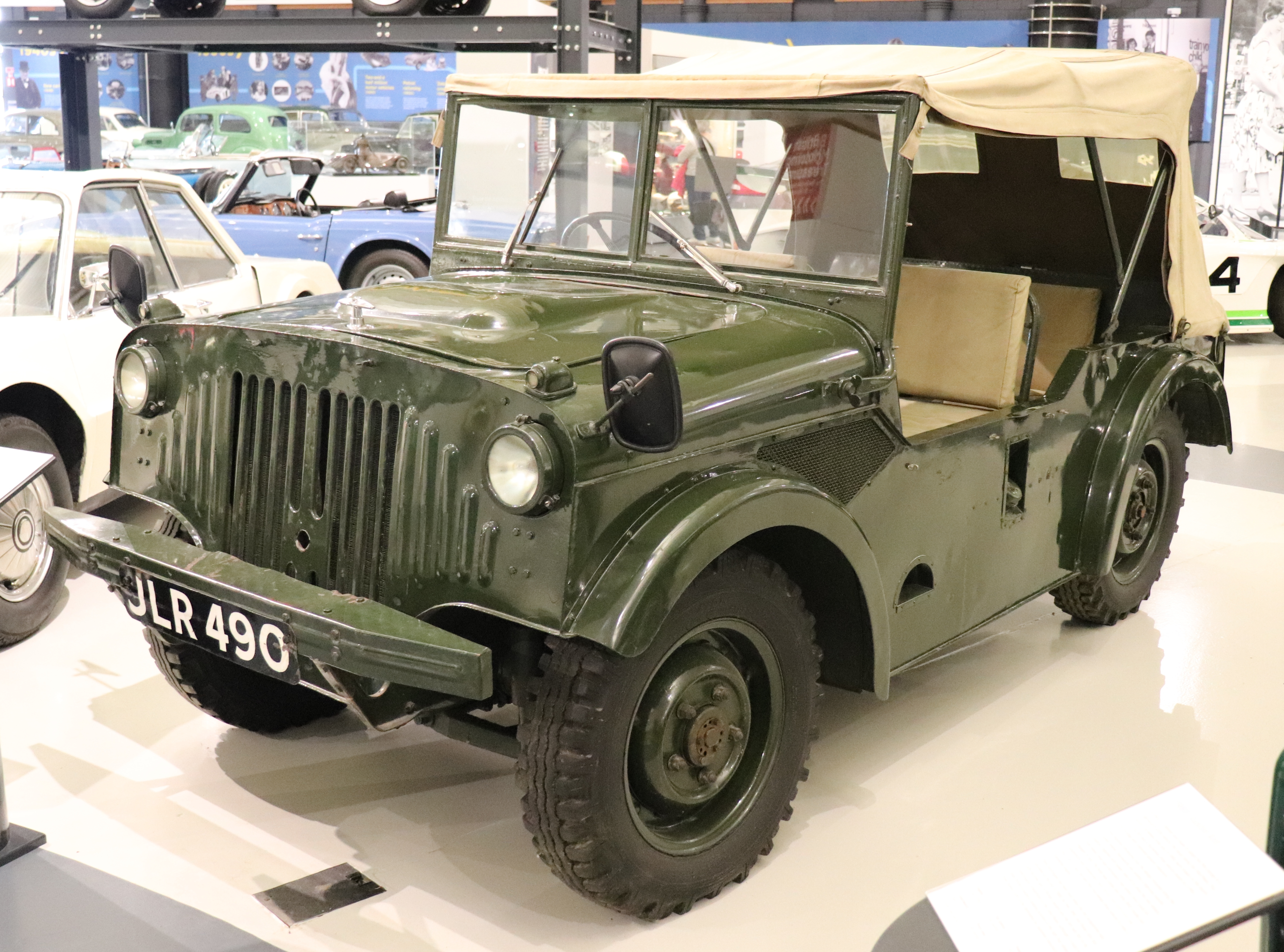
Nuffield Gutty prototype displayed in the BMM, Gaydon

The name Nuffield Gutty was used for three prototype vehicles built in 1947 in an attempt to meet a British War Department specification for a light field car to replace the American Jeep that was in service in large numbers following the war. This vehicle featured a horizontally opposed 4-cylinder engine similar to that designed for the planned small post-war car to be called the Morris Mosquito, that eventually appeared (with a conventional vertical side-valve engine) as the Morris Minor.

The Gutty was not directly successful but is regarded as the predecessor of the FV1800 Wolseley Mudlark which was in turn the immediate predecessor of the Austin Champ. One of the three prototype vehicles has survived and was formerly on display at the Museum of Army Transport in Beverley, Yorkshire (closed 2003) and was in storage until 2011 when it was transferred to the Heritage Motor Centre.

The confusingly similar name "Nuffield Guppy" had previously been used for an unrelated prototype vehicle.

== See also ==
- Mini Moke
- Austin Ant
- Austin Champ
- Austin Gipsy
