= Guppy (disambiguation) =

A guppy is a species of tropical fish.

Guppy or GUPPY may also refer to:

== People ==
- Guppy (surname)
- John Guppy Troup (born 1950), professional ten-pin bowler

== Transportation ==
- Aero Spacelines Guppy lines of wide-bodied cargo aircraft used for hauling outsize cargo components
  - Pregnant Guppy
  - Mini Guppy
  - Super Guppy
- Greater Underwater Propulsion Power Program (GUPPY) a U.S. submarine propulsion program
- Cony Guppy, a 1960s small pickup truck manufactured by Aichi
- Nuffield Guppy, a small military parachute-droppable vehicle of the 1940s intended to be used by paratroopers
- Guppy, the sailboat used by Laura Dekker in her world circumnavigation

== Music ==
- Guppy (album), a 2017 album by Charly Bliss
- Guppy (band), a US band

== Other uses ==
- Guppy (film), a 2016 Indian Malayalam film
- Guppy (programming language)
- Guppy, a type of handhold in climbing and bouldering

== See also ==
- Bubble Guppies, a Nickelodeon animated children's TV show
- Joshua James Guppey (1820–1893), American lawyer, politician, Civil War officer and pioneer
