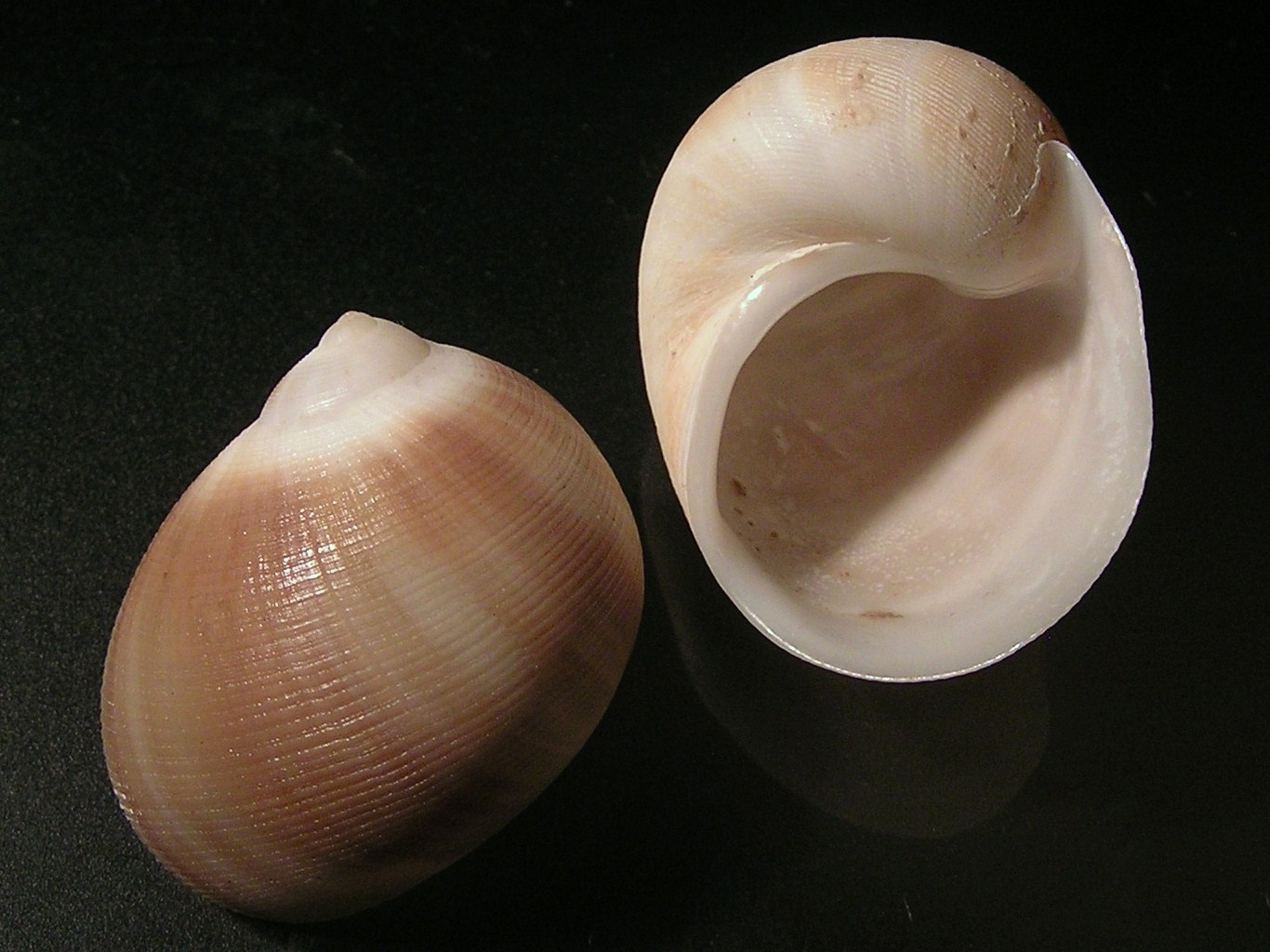
- Two shells of Sinum grayi

Scientific classification
- Kingdom: Animalia
- Phylum: Mollusca
- Class: Gastropoda
- Subclass: Caenogastropoda
- Order: Littorinimorpha
- Family: Naticidae
- Genus: Sinum
- Species: S. grayi

Binomial name
- Sinum grayi (Deshayes, 1843)

Synonyms
- Sigaretus grayi Deshayes, 1843 (original combination); Sinum (Sinum) grayi (Deshayes, 1843) · alternate representation

= Sinum grayi =

Species of gastropod

Sinum grayi is a species of predatory sea snail, a marine gastropod mollusk in the family Naticidae, the moon snails.

== Description ==
The length of the shell attains 48.3 mm.

== Distribution ==
This species occurs in the Pacific Ocean from Peru to Chile.
