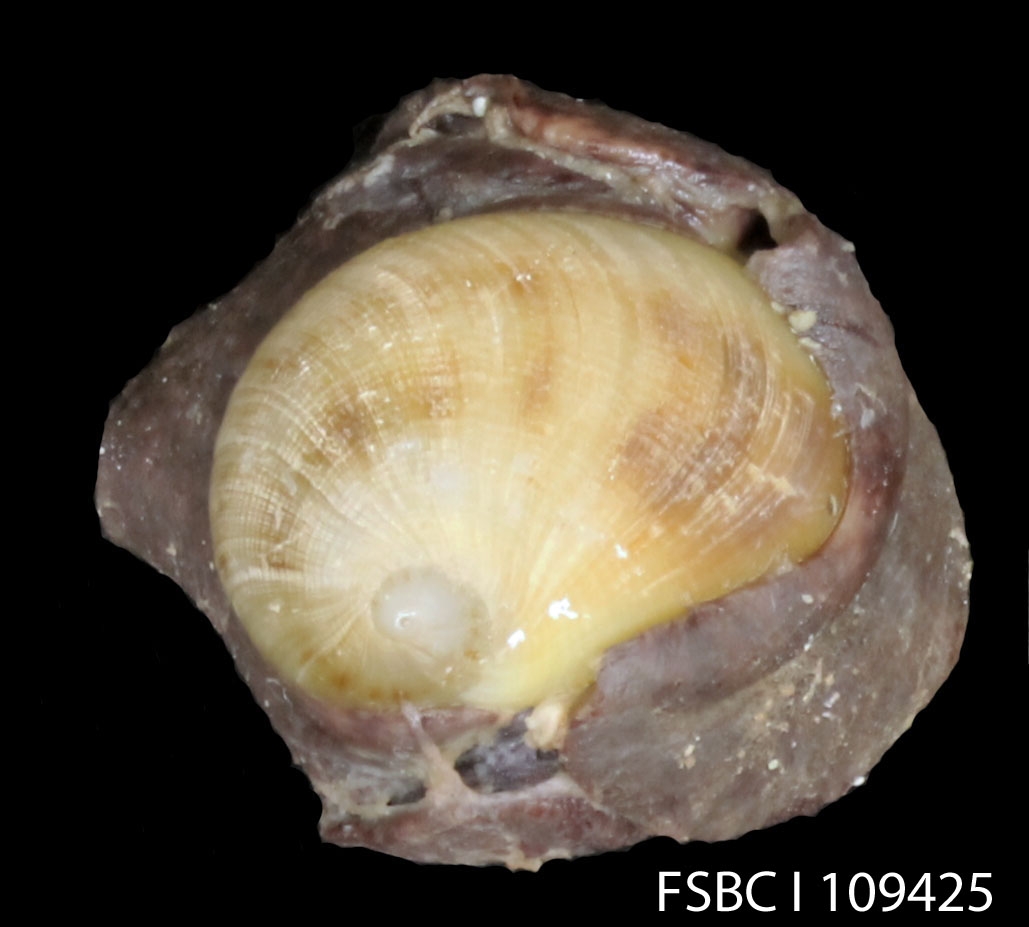
- Fixed specimen of Sinum maculatum.

Scientific classification
- Kingdom: Animalia
- Phylum: Mollusca
- Class: Gastropoda
- Subclass: Caenogastropoda
- Order: Littorinimorpha
- Family: Naticidae
- Genus: Sinum
- Species: S. maculatum

Binomial name
- Sinum maculatum (Say, 1831)

= Sinum maculatum =

Species of gastropod

Sinum maculatum is a species of predatory sea snail, a marine gastropod mollusk in the family Naticidae, the moon snails.

== Description ==
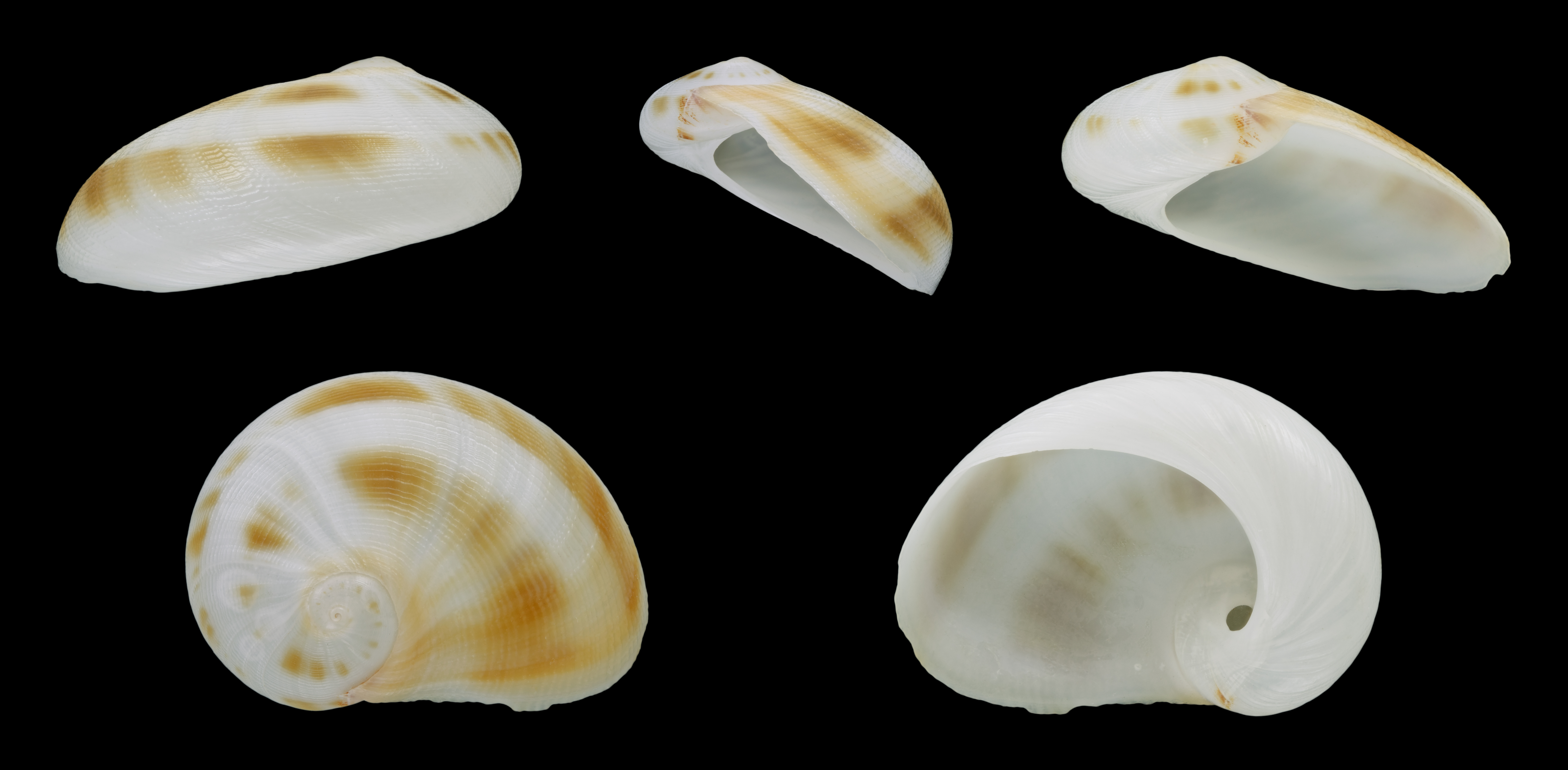
Sinum maculatum, shell

The maximum recorded shell length is 35 mm.

== Habitat ==
Minimum recorded depth is 0.3 m. Maximum recorded depth is 70 m.
