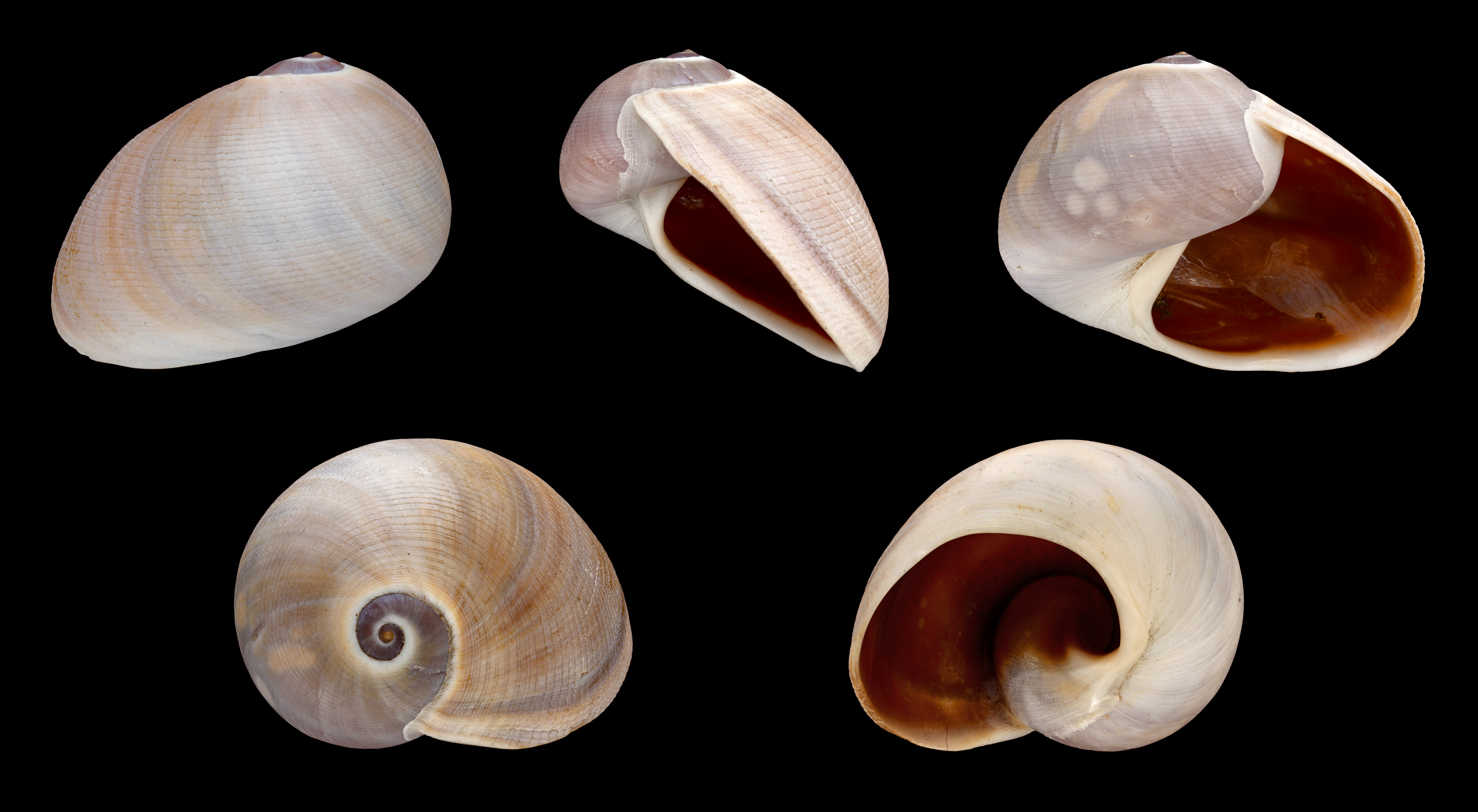
- Five views of a shell of Sinum cymba

Scientific classification
- Kingdom: Animalia
- Phylum: Mollusca
- Class: Gastropoda
- Subclass: Caenogastropoda
- Order: Littorinimorpha
- Superfamily: Naticoidea
- Family: Naticidae
- Genus: Sinum; Röding, 1798

Type species
- Helix haliotoidea Linnaeus, 1758

Synonyms
- Catinus Oken, 1835; Cryptostoma Blainville, 1818; Cryptostoma as used by Gray, 1834 (incorrect subsequent spelling); Cryptostomus Blainville, 1818; Ectosinum Iredale, 1931; Sigaretus Lamarck, 1799; Sinum (Ectosinum) Iredale, 1931 · accepted, alternate representation; Sinum (Sinum) Röding, 1798 · accepted, alternate representation

= Sinum =

Genus of gastropods

Sinum is a genus of predatory sea snails, marine gastropod mollusks in the subfamily Sininae of the family Naticidae, the moon snails.

Most naticids have shells that are globular, but the shell of species in the genus Sinum is flattened to some extent, some being so flattened that they are ear-shaped.

== Distribution ==
This marine species is cosmopolitan.

== Species ==
Species within the genus Sinum include:

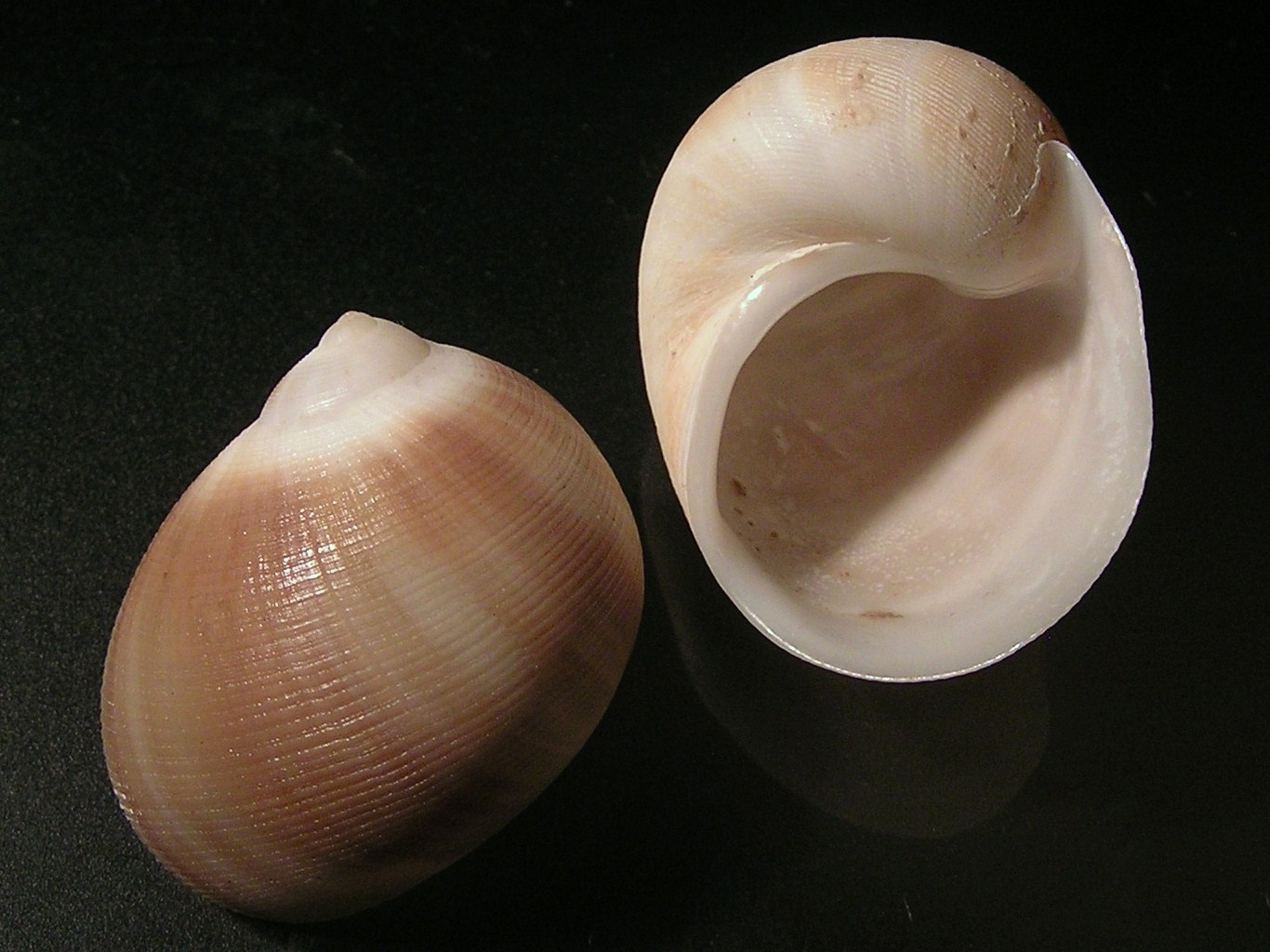
Shells of Sinum grayi

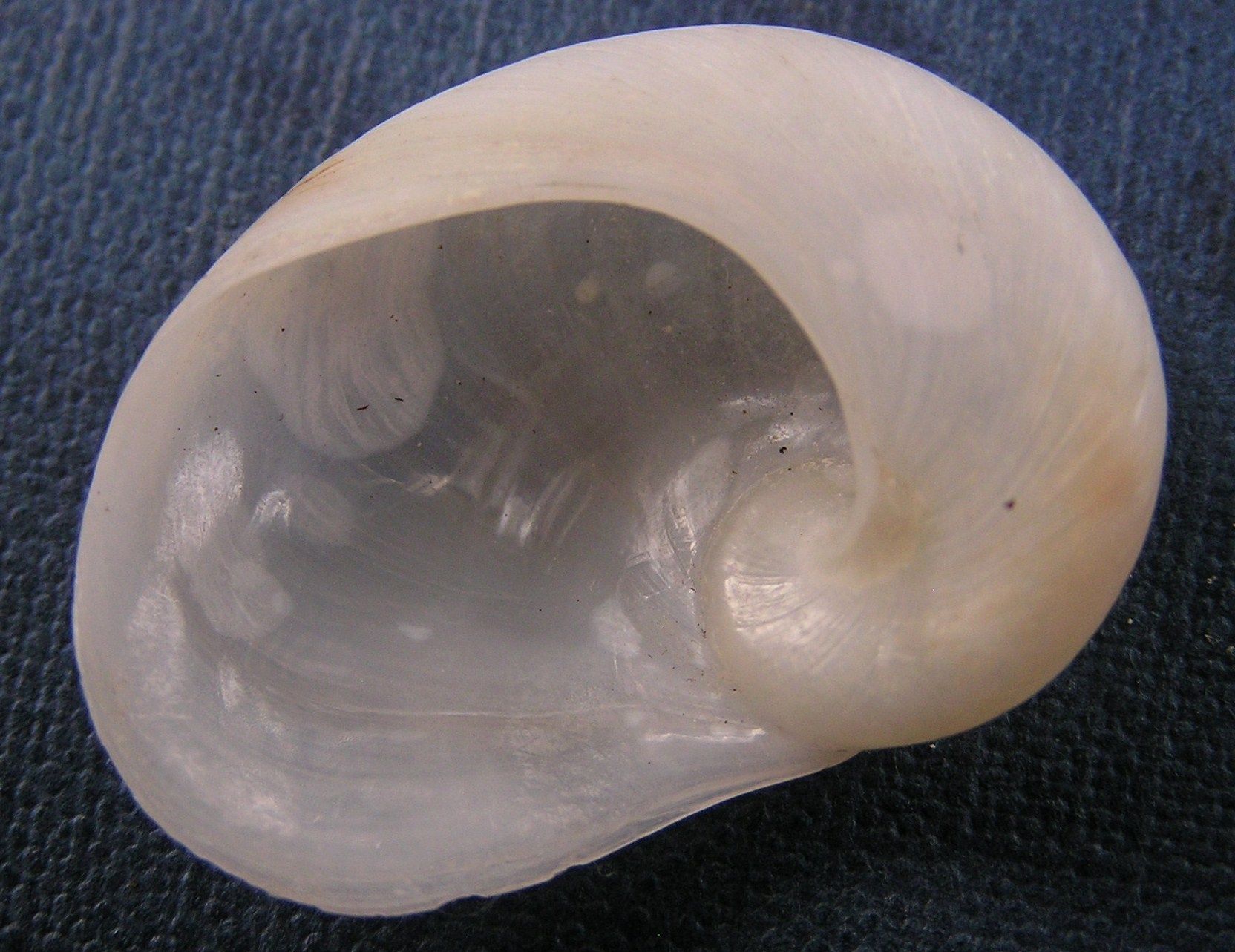
A shell of Sinum haliotoideum

- Sinum bifasciatum (Récluz, 1851)
- Sinum concavum (Lamarck, 1822)
- Sinum cortezi Burch & Burch, 1964
- Sinum cymba (Menke, K.T., 1828)
- Sinum debile (Gould, 1853)
- Sinum delesserti (Récluz in Chenu, 1843)
- Sinum diauges Kilburn, 1974
- Sinum eximium (Reeve, 1864)
- † Sinum faviai Lozouet, 2001
- Sinum grayi G. P. Deshayes, 1843
- Sinum haliotoideum (Linnaeus, 1758)
- Sinum incisum (Reeve, 1864)
- † Sinum infirmum Marwick, 1924
- Sinum japonicum (Lischke, 1872)
- Sinum javanicum (Gray, 1834)
- Sinum keratium Dall, 1919
- Sinum laevigatum (Lamarck, 1822)
- Sinum maculatum (Say, 1831)
- † Sinum marwicki Laws, 1930
- Sinum minus (Dall, 1889)
- Sinum nanhaiense S.-P. Zhang, 2009
- Sinum neritoideum (Linnaeus, 1758)
- Sinum noyesii Dall, 1903
- Sinum perspectivum (Say, 1831)
- Sinum planulatum (Récluz, 1843)
- Sinum quasimodoides Kilburn, 1976
- Sinum sanctijohannis (Pilshry & Lowe, 1932)
- Sinum scopulosum (Conrad, 1849)
- Sinum vittatum Zhang, 2008
- Sinum zonale (Quoy & Gaimard, 1832)

The Indo-Pacific Molluscan database also mentions the following species with names in current use

- Sinum unifasciatus Récluz, 1843

Species brought into synonymy

- Sinum acuminatus (Adams & Reeve, 1850): synonym of Conuber conicum (Lamarck, 1822)
- Sinum californicum I. Oldroyd, 1917: synonym of Sinum scopulosum (Conrad, 1849)
- Sinum cuvierianum (Récluz, 1844): synonym of Vanikoro cuvieriana (Récluz, 1844)
- Sinum fuscum Röding, 1798: synonym of Sinum haliotoideum (Linnaeus, 1758)
- Sinum insculptus Adams & Reeve, 1850: synonym of Sinum javanicum (Gray, 1834)
- Sinum latifasciatus Adams & Reeve, 1850: synonym of Sinum neritoideum (Linnaeus, 1758)
- Sinum minor [sic]: synonym of Sinum minus (Dall, 1889)
- Sinum nanhaiensis S.-P. Zhang, 2009: synonym of Sinum nanhaiense S.-P. Zhang, 2009 (wrong gender agreement of specific epithet)
- Sinum papilla (Gmelin, 1791): synonym of Eunaticina papilla (Gmelin, 1791)
- Sinum parvus (E. A. Smith, 1895): synonym of Sinum neritoideum (Linnaeus, 1758)
- Sinum petitianus Récluz, 1843: synonym of Sigaretus petitianus Récluz in Chenu, 1843 (taxon inquirendum)
- Sinum pazianum Dall, 1919: synonym of Sinum debile (Gould, 1853)
- Sinum planatum: synonym of Sinum planulatum (Récluz, 1843)
- Sinum sinuatus Récluz, 1851: synonym of Sigaretus sinuatus Récluz, 1851 (taxon inquirendum)
- Sinum tener (Smith, 1894): synonym of Eunaticina papilla (Gmelin, 1791)
- Sinum weberi (Bartsch, 1918): synonym of Sinum incisum (Reeve, 1864)
