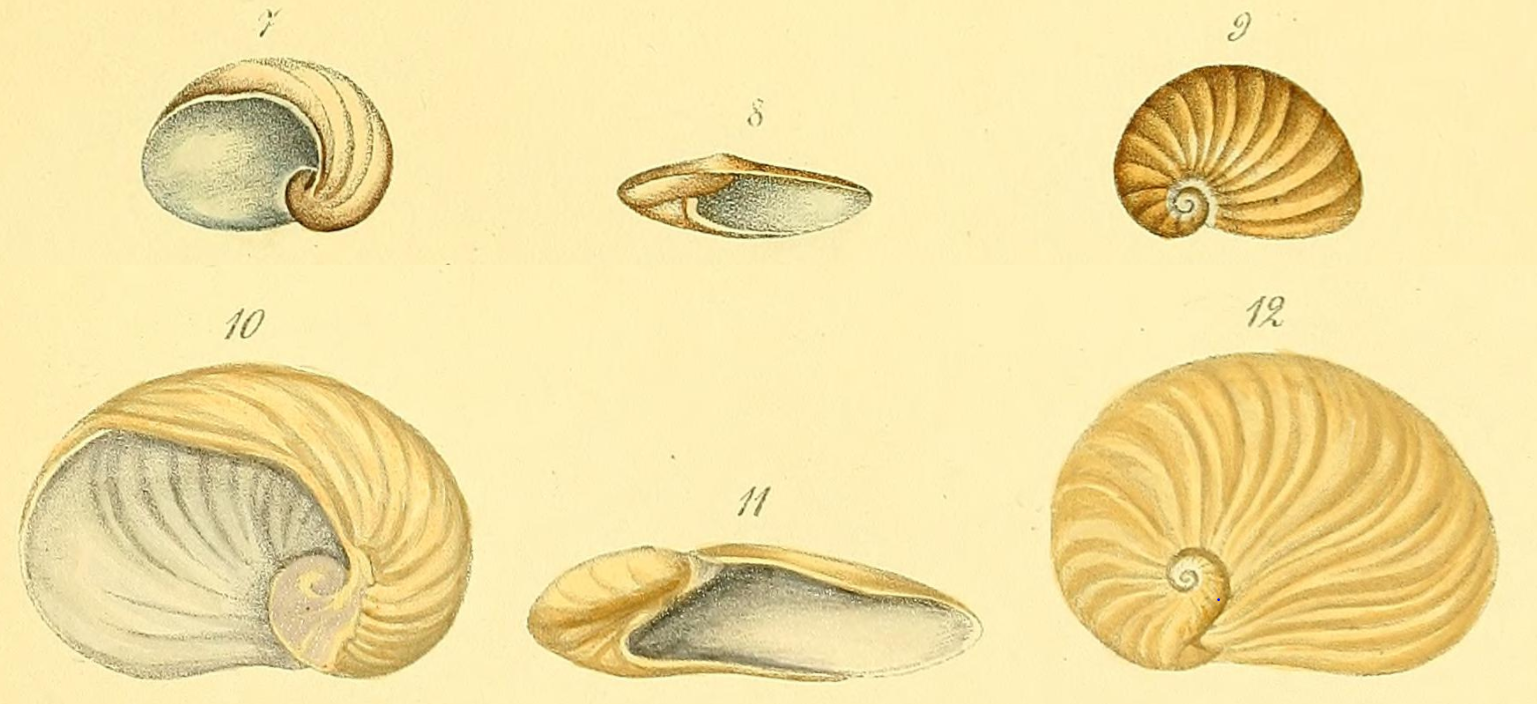
- Illustration of juvenile (7–9) and adult (10–12) S. planulatum from Weinkauff.

Scientific classification
- Kingdom: Animalia
- Phylum: Mollusca
- Class: Gastropoda
- Subclass: Caenogastropoda
- Order: Littorinimorpha
- Family: Naticidae
- Genus: Sinum
- Species: S. planulatum

Binomial name
- Sinum planulatum (Récluz, 1843)

Synonyms
- Ectosinum pauloconvexum Iredale, 1931; Ectosinum planulatum (Récluz, 1843); Sigaretus gualtierianus Récluz, 1851; Sigaretus planulatus Récluz, 1843 (original combination); Sinum (Ectosinum) planulatum (Récluz, 1843) accepted - alternate representation; Sinum planatum (misspelling)

= Sinum planulatum =

Species of gastropod

Sinum planulatum, the flattened ear snail, is a species of sea snail, a marine gastropod mollusk in the family Naticidae, also known as the moon snails.

== Description ==
The size of the shell varies between 22 and 33 mm (0.87 and 1.30 in).

== Distribution ==
Sinum planulatum species mainly occur off the coast of African countries such as Tanzania and Mozambique, though they have also been found off the coasts of Australia, Japan, India, the Philippines, and China.
