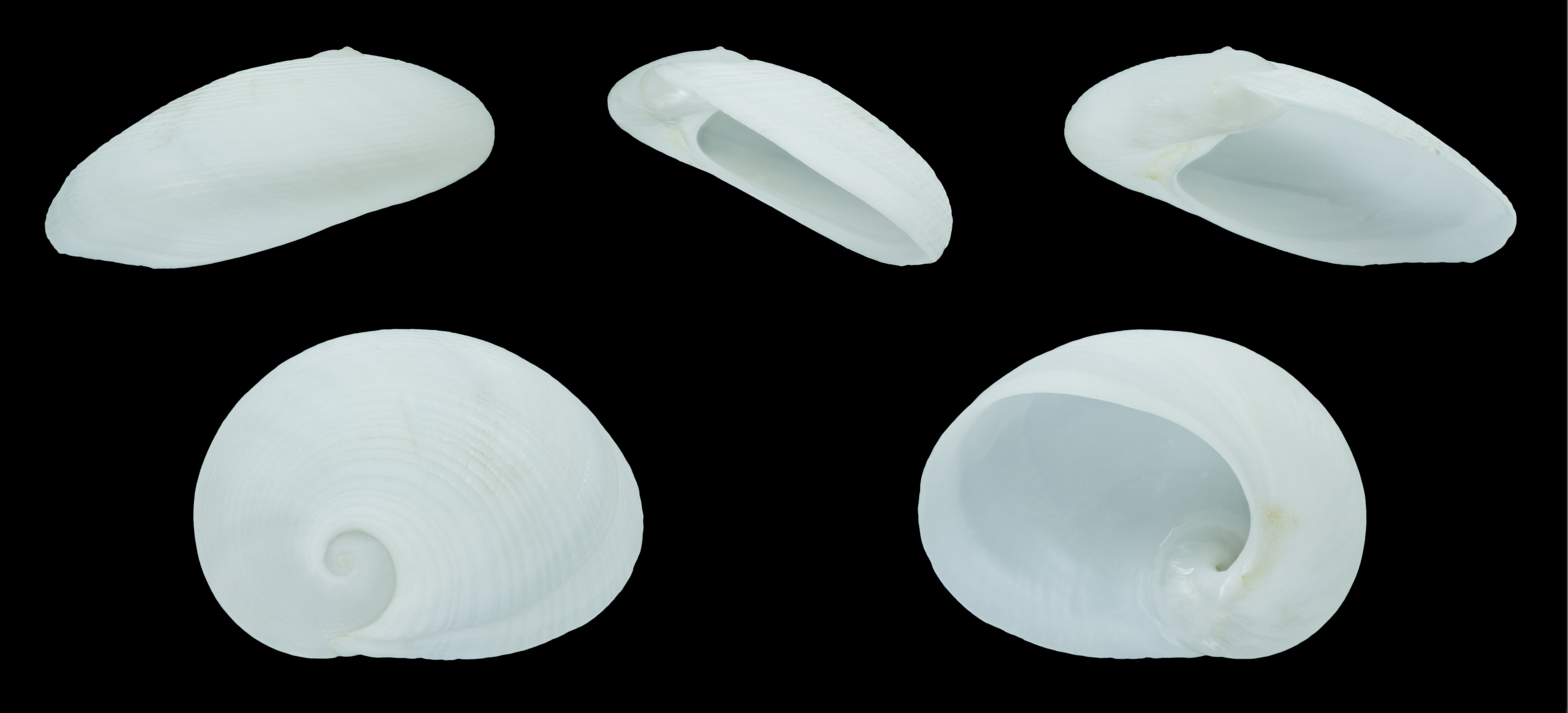

Scientific classification
- Kingdom: Animalia
- Phylum: Mollusca
- Class: Gastropoda
- Subclass: Caenogastropoda
- Order: Littorinimorpha
- Family: Naticidae
- Genus: Sinum
- Species: S. perspectivum

Binomial name
- Sinum perspectivum (Say, 1831)

= Sinum perspectivum =

Species of gastropod

Sinum perspectivum, common name the white baby ear, is a species of predatory sea snail, a marine gastropod mollusk in the family Naticidae, the moon snails.

== Distribution ==
Sinum perspectivum is found on the eastern coast of America from Maryland south to Brazil, and also round Bermuda.

== Description ==
The maximum recorded shell length is 51 mm. It has a shallowly coiled shell with a wide opening and graceful curved outline. It is white both outside and inside. Like the other members of its family, it is carnivorous.

== Habitat ==
Minimum recorded depth is 0 m. Maximum recorded depth is 70 m.
