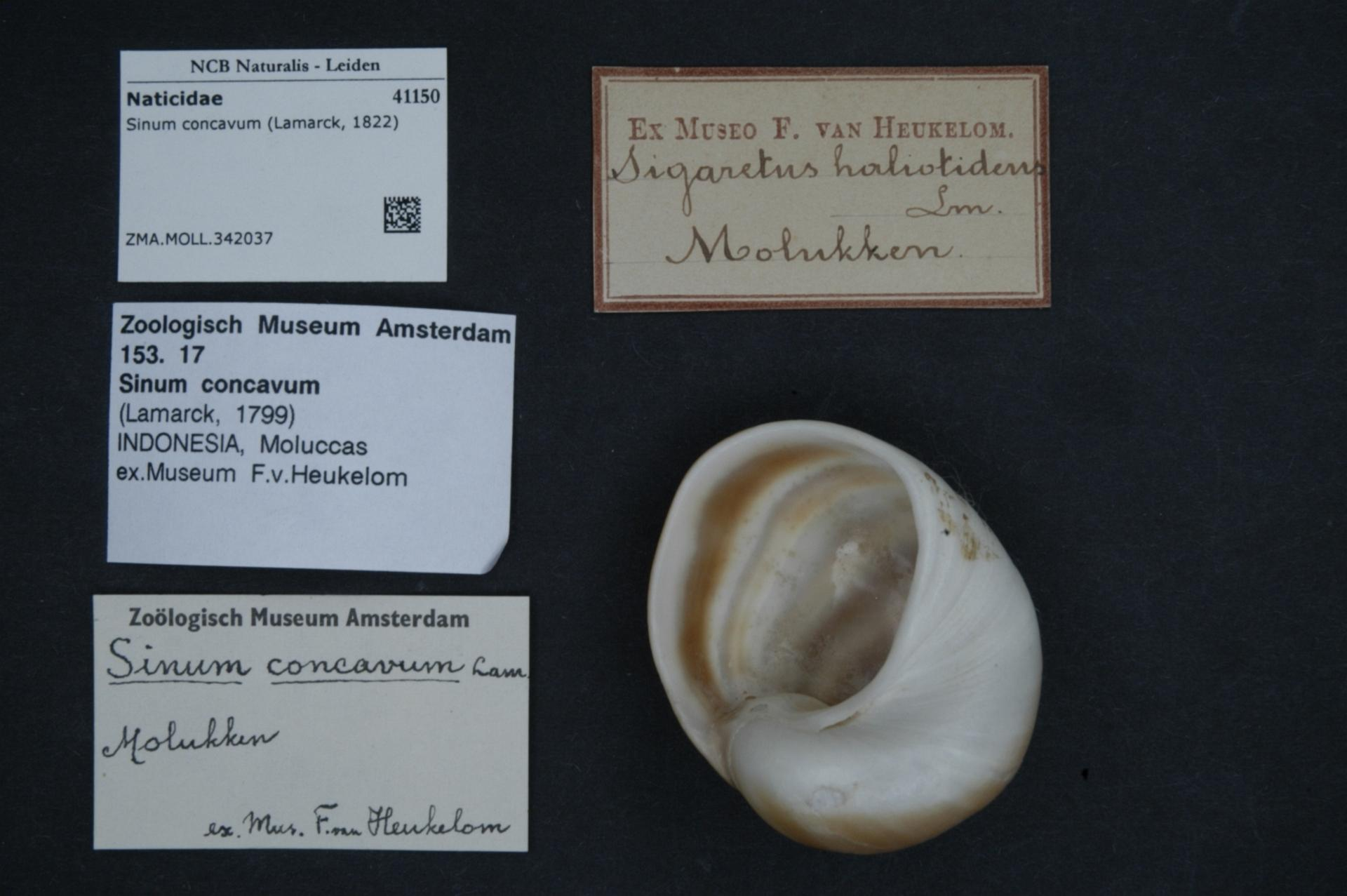
- Sinum concavum shell

Scientific classification
- Kingdom: Animalia
- Phylum: Mollusca
- Class: Gastropoda
- Subclass: Caenogastropoda
- Order: Littorinimorpha
- Family: Naticidae
- Genus: Sinum
- Species: S. concavum

Binomial name
- Sinum concavum (Lamarck, 1822)

Synonyms
- Sigaretus concavus Lamarck, 1822 (basionym)

= Sinum concavum =

Species of gastropod

Sinum concavum, common name the concave ear moon snail, is a species of predatory sea snail, a marine gastropod mollusk in the family Naticidae, the moon snails.

== Description ==
The size of an adult shell varies between 19 mm and 50 mm.

== Distribution ==
This species is present in the Atlantic Ocean off Senegal, Guinea, and Angola.
