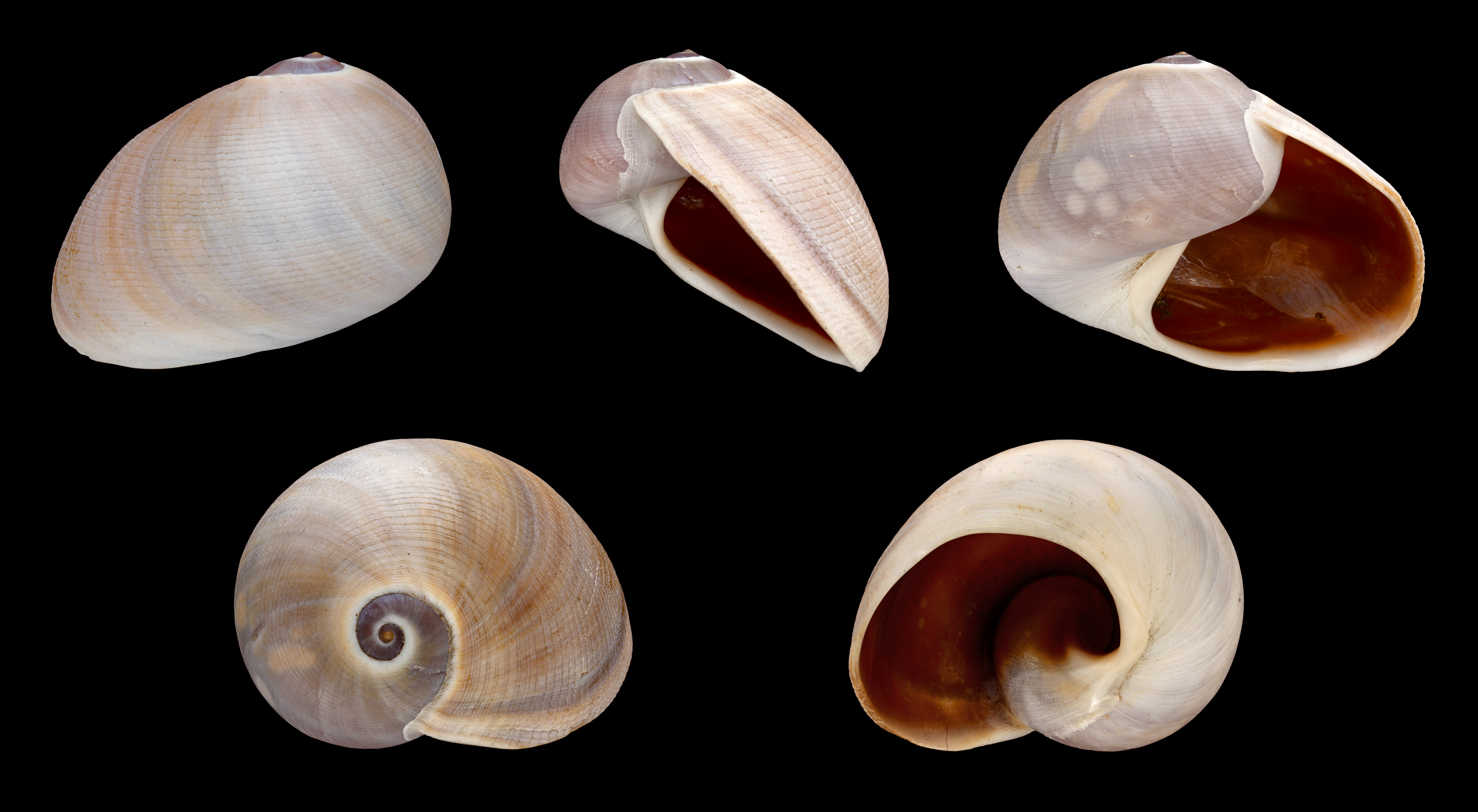
- Five views of a shell of Sinum cymba
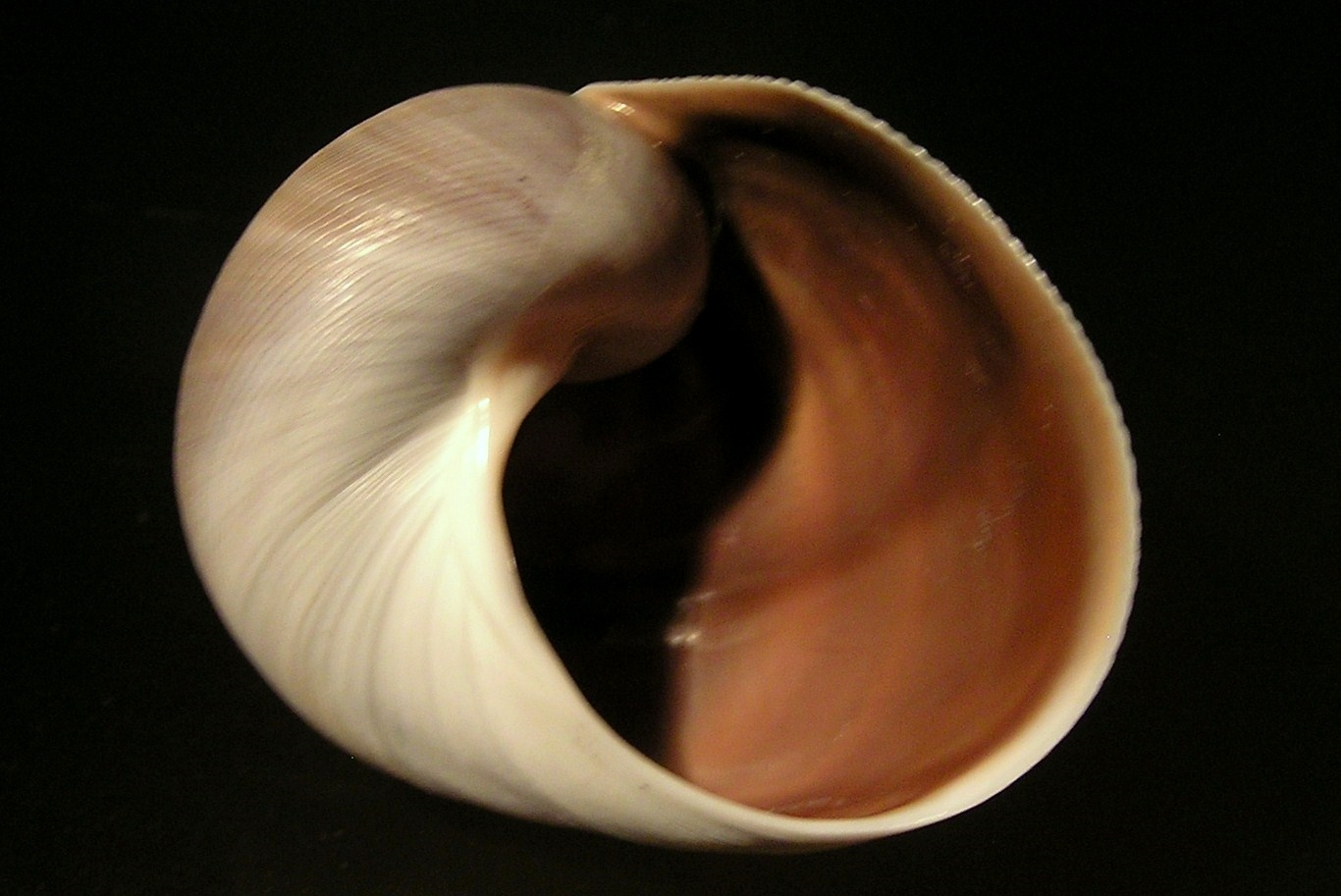
- Apertural view of a shell of Sinum cymba

Scientific classification
- Kingdom: Animalia
- Phylum: Mollusca
- Class: Gastropoda
- Subclass: Caenogastropoda
- Order: Littorinimorpha
- Family: Naticidae
- Genus: Sinum
- Species: S. cymba

Binomial name
- Sinum cymba (Menke, 1828)

Synonyms
- Natica cymba Menke, 1828; Sigaretus maximus Philippi, 1844

= Sinum cymba =

Species of gastropod

Sinum cymba, common name the concave ear moon snail, is a species of predatory sea snail, a marine gastropod mollusk in the family Naticidae, the moon snails.

It was classified by the German malacologist Karl Theodor Menke in 1828 with the name Natica cymba.

== Description ==
Shell with a wide opening, brown and smooth; with an external coloration of purplish-brown to pale, gray or white, on a surface with a waxy shine, provided with fine spiral lines. The spiral is low and up to 7 centimeters long, when developed; ending in a broad turn. There is no umbilical underneath. The outer lip is thin and angular.

The species lives in cold, shallow waters.

== Distribution ==
It is common in the eastern Pacific Ocean, on the coasts of South America to Chile, including the Galápagos, and southern Central America, in Panama.

== Subfamily Sininae ==
The Naticidae of the subfamily Sininae have a low spiral and a wide aperture or so wide that they are mistaken for abalones without perforations; they have auriform (ear -shaped) shells. They have a very small horny operculum.
