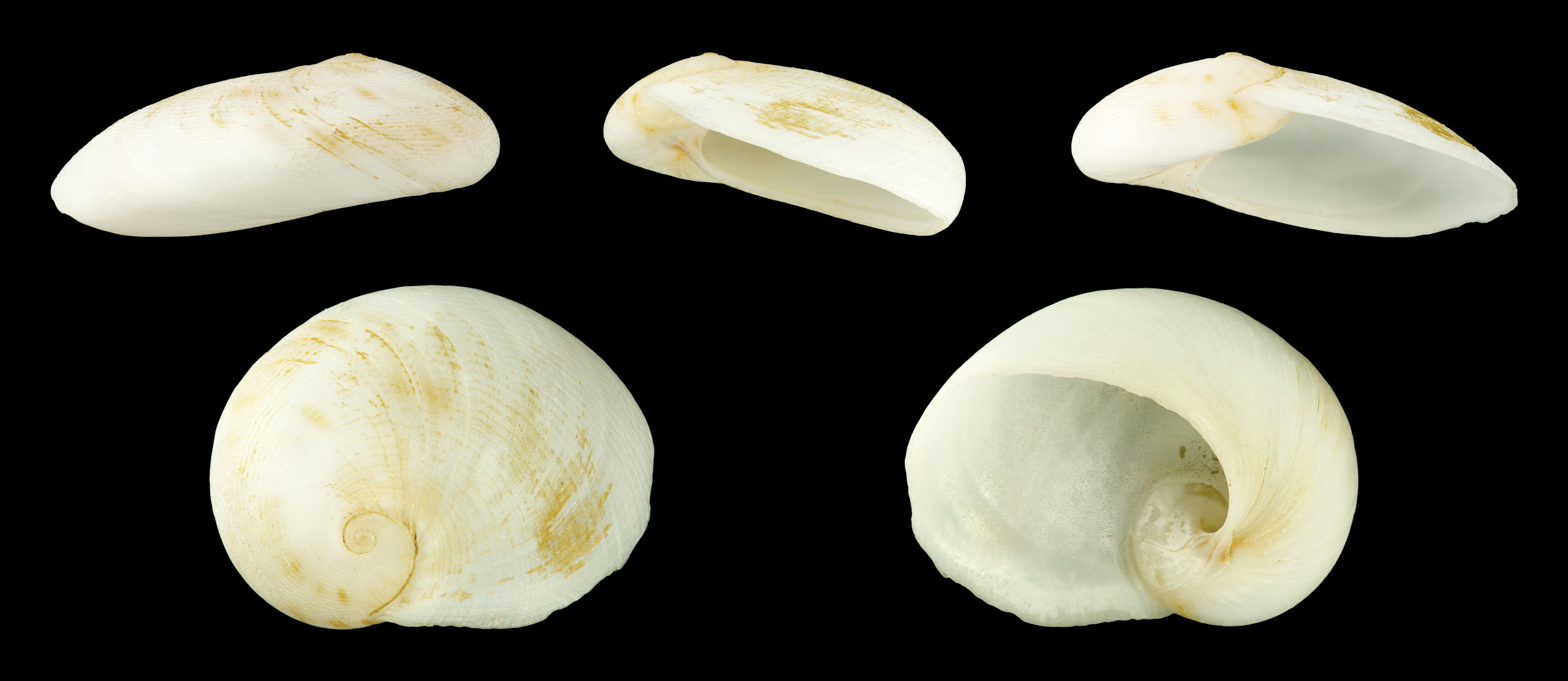

Scientific classification
- Kingdom: Animalia
- Phylum: Mollusca
- Class: Gastropoda
- Subclass: Caenogastropoda
- Order: Littorinimorpha
- Family: Naticidae
- Genus: Sinum
- Species: S. bifasciatum

Binomial name
- Sinum bifasciatum (Récluz, 1851)

Synonyms
- Sigaretus bifasciatus Récluz, 1851 (basionym); Sigaretus menkeanus Dunker, 1853 (junior synonym); Sigaretus philippii Weinkauff, 1883; Sinum (Ectosinum) bifasciatum (Récluz, 1851) · alternate representation

= Sinum bifasciatum =

Species of gastropod

Sinum bifasciatum is a species of predatory sea snail, a marine gastropod mollusk in the family Naticidae, the moon snails.

== Description ==
The size of an adult shell varies between 18 mm and 40 mm.

== Distribution ==
This species occurs in the Mediterranean Sea, in the Atlantic Ocean along the Canary Islands, Cape Verdes, Morocco, West Africa, and Angola.
