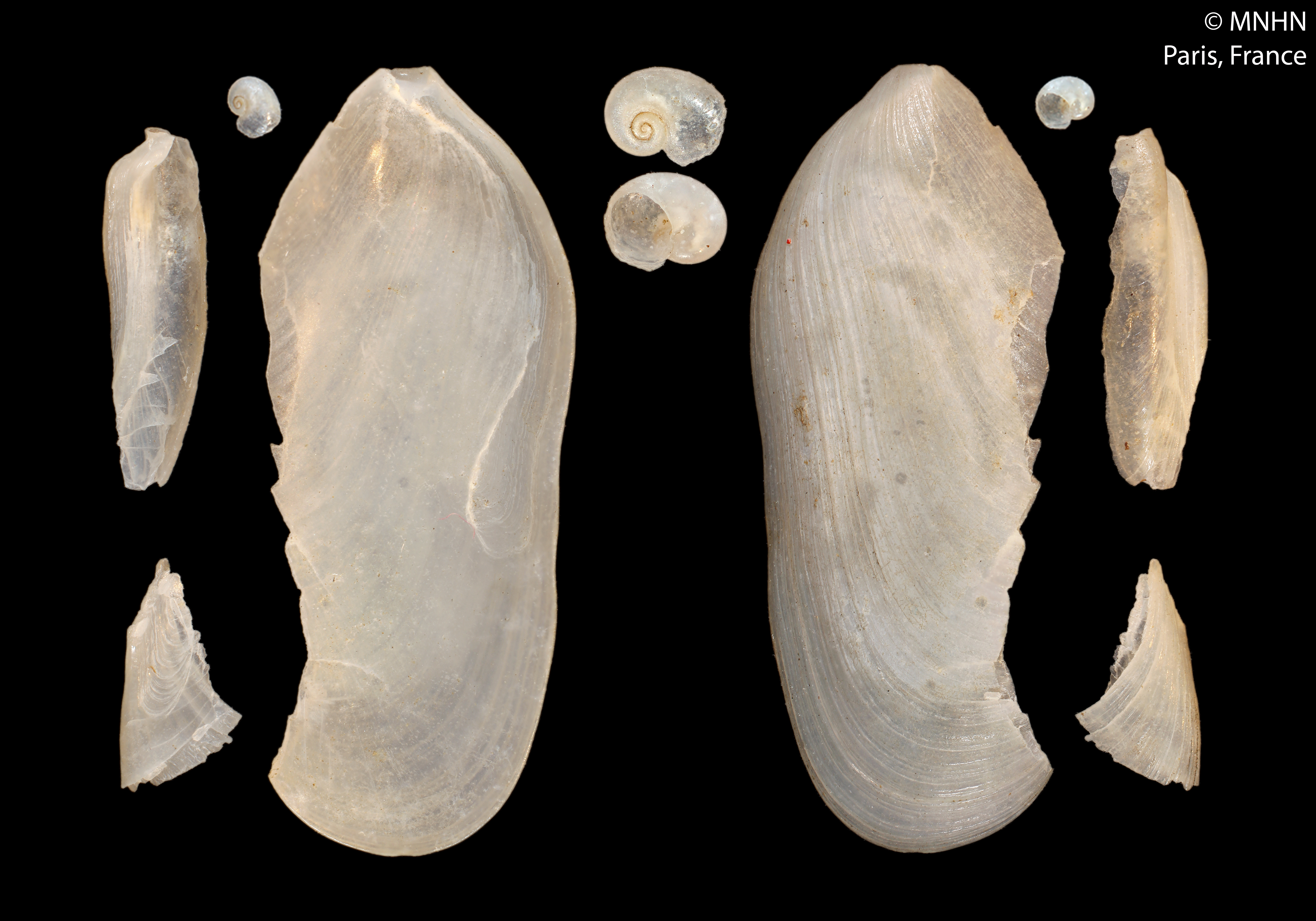
- Shell of Haliotinella patinaria

Scientific classification
- Kingdom: Animalia
- Phylum: Mollusca
- Class: Gastropoda
- Subclass: Caenogastropoda
- Order: Littorinimorpha
- Superfamily: Naticoidea
- Family: Naticidae
- Genus: Haliotinella; Souverbie, 1875

Type species
- Haliotinella montrouzieri Souverbie, 1875

Species
- See text

= Haliotinella =

Genus of gastropods

Haliotinella is a genus of predatory sea snails, marine gastropod mollusks in the subfamily [unassigned] Naticidae of the family Naticidae, the moon snails.

== Species ==
Species within the genus Haliotinella include:

- Haliotinella montrouzieri Souverbie, 1875
- Haliotinella patinaria Guppy, 1876
