= Sinum laevigatum =

Scientific classification
- Kingdom: Animalia
- Phylum: Mollusca
- Class: Gastropoda
- Subclass: Caenogastropoda
- Order: Littorinimorpha
- Family: Naticidae
- Genus: Sinum
- Species: S. laevigatum

Binomial name
- Sinum laevigatum (Lamarck, 1822)

Synonyms
- Sigaretus delesserti Récluz in Chenu, 1843

Species of gastropod

Sinum laevigatum is a species of predatory sea snail, a marine gastropod mollusk in the family Naticidae, the moon snails.

== Distribution ==
This species is distributed in the Indian Ocean along Madagascar.
