= Sinum vittatum =

Scientific classification
- Kingdom: Animalia
- Phylum: Mollusca
- Class: Gastropoda
- Subclass: Caenogastropoda
- Order: Littorinimorpha
- Family: Naticidae
- Genus: Sinum
- Species: S. vittatum

Binomial name
- Sinum vittatum Zhang, 2008

Species of gastropod

Sinum vittatum is a species of predatory sea snail, a marine gastropod mollusk in the family Naticidae, the moon snails.
