= Sinum minus =

Scientific classification
- Kingdom: Animalia
- Phylum: Mollusca
- Class: Gastropoda
- Subclass: Caenogastropoda
- Order: Littorinimorpha
- Family: Naticidae
- Genus: Sinum
- Species: S. minus

Binomial name
- Sinum minus (Dall, 1889)

Synonyms
- Sigaretus minus Dall, 1889 (basionym)

Species of gastropod

Sinum minus is a species of predatory sea snail, a marine gastropod mollusc in the family Naticidae, the moon snails.

== Distribution ==
This species occurs in the Gulf of Mexico.

== Description ==
The maximum recorded shell length is 13 mm.

== Habitat ==
Minimum recorded depth is 64 m. Maximum recorded depth is 154 m.
