= Nuffield Guppy =

British military vehicle (WW2)

The Nuffield Guppy was a small military vehicle designed by Sir Alec Issigonis while he worked for the Nuffield Organization in the early 1940s. The vehicle was designed to be parachute-droppable and was intended to assist paratroops to transport loads up to 500 lb (227 kg) at walking speeds and to be amphibious. The vehicle resembled the DUKW but was only about 8 feet (2.4 m) long. It had large balloon tyres and an outboard motor at the rear. It was capable of carrying one person with equipment, or being used as a motorised wheelbarrow by someone walking alongside the vehicle.

The war in Europe ended before the Guppy saw service.

The similar name "Nuffield Gutty" was subsequently used for several unrelated prototype vehicles.

== See also ==
- Mini Moke
- Austin Ant
- Austin Champ
