= Austin Champ =

British jeep-like vehicle

Truck, 1/4 ton, CT, 4×4, Cargo & FFW, Austin Mk.1 Austin Champ
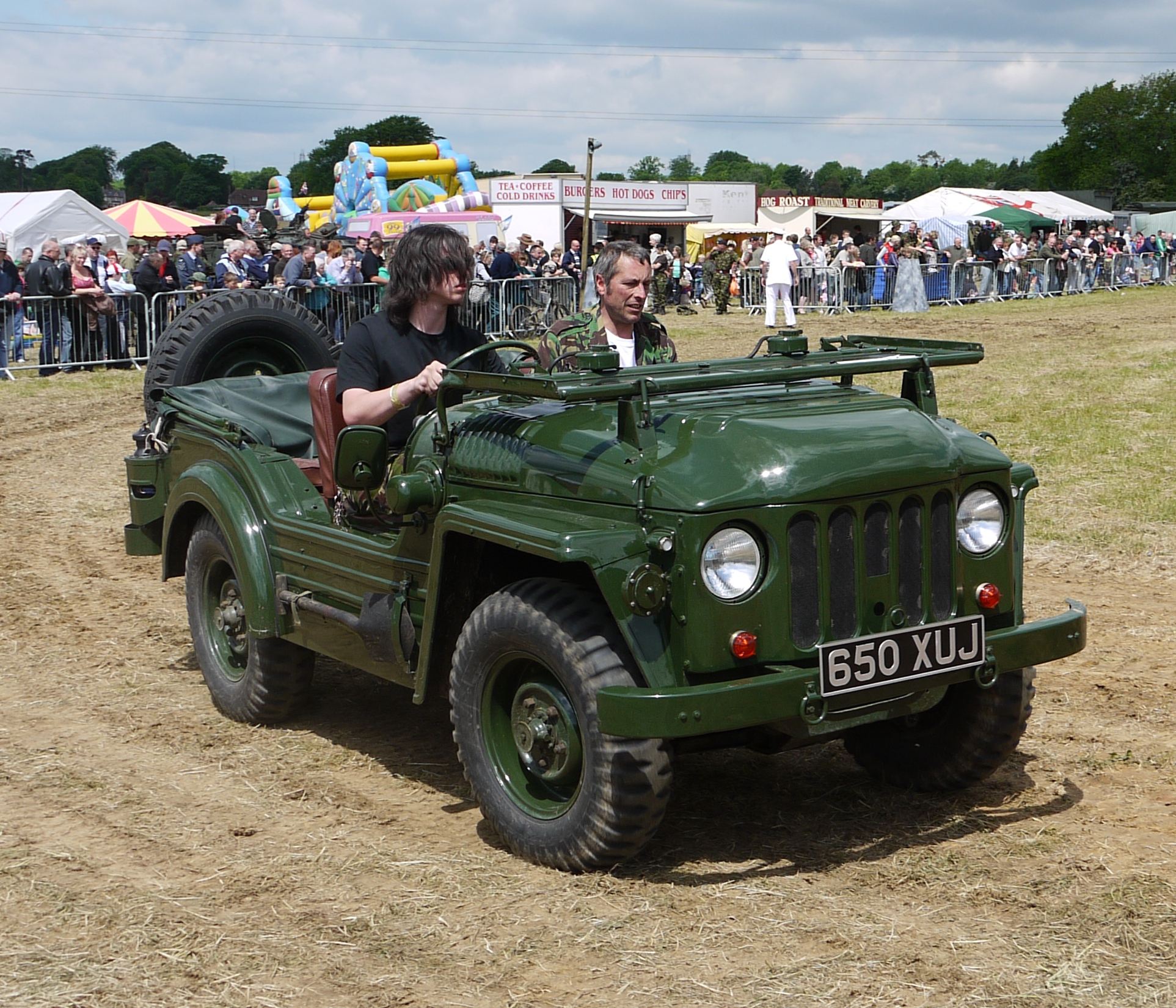

Overview
- Manufacturer: Austin Motor Company
- Also called: FV1801(a), WN1, WN2, WN3.
- Production: 1 September 1951 – May 1956

Body and chassis
- Body style: Four-seat "Jeep"-style tub

Powertrain
- Engine: Rolls-Royce 2838 cc 80 hp (60 kW) I4 petrol

Dimensions
- Length: 3.66 m (12 ft)
- Width: 1.65 m (5 ft 5 in)
- Height: 1.87 m (6 ft 1½ in)

Chronology
- Predecessor: Wolseley Mudlark
- Successor: Austin Gipsy

The Austin Champ was a military and civilian jeep-like vehicle made by the Austin Motor Company in the 1950s. The army version was officially known as "Truck, 1/4 ton, CT, 4×4, Cargo & FFW, Austin Mk.1" however the civilian name "Champ" was universally, if unofficially, applied to it. The majority of Champs produced went to the British Army.

== History ==
A British Army specification for a light truck was issued in the late 1940s, inspired by the Willys MB "Jeep" but able to perform in all theatres of operation of the British Army. It was considered important that a British-made vehicle was produced in order to reduce the reliance on American vehicles and the foreign expenditure that entailed.

A project to design a "Car 4×4 5 cwt FV1800-Series" was launched in 1947, and the Nuffield Organization built three prototype designs known as the "Nuffield Gutty". Testing revealed serious shortcomings and the design was improved by a team at the government Fighting Vehicles Research and Development Establishment (FVRDE) under the leadership of Charles William "Rex" Sewell. The suspension system was designed by Alec Issigonis, who went on to design the Morris Minor and the Mini.

About 30 prototypes of the improved vehicle were built by Wolseley Motors Limited under the name "Wolseley Mudlark", and after further refinement the design was formalised as FV1801(a). The Austin Motor Company was awarded the contract to produce 15,000 vehicles and a former aircraft factory at Cofton Hackett, on the edge of Austin's Longbridge plant in Birmingham, was fitted out for the work. The first production vehicle was completed on 1 September 1951. The formal title: "Truck, 1/4 Ton, 4×4, CT, Austin Mk.1" was assigned (CT being a contraction of CombaT, both a designation of function and also the title of a planned family of vehicles designed by FVRDE). The Rolls-Royce-designed B40 four-cylinder engine of 2838 cc was fitted, the smallest of the standardised B-Range engines. This military version was designated model WN1 by Austin. Approximately half of the contract were to be basic vehicles known as Cargo trucks and the remainder were to be fitted with high-output generators and additional batteries in order to power radio equipment. These were known as "Fitted For Wireless" (FFW) vehicles. Rolls-Royce Ltd built engines for the early production vehicles, but later ones were fitted with a virtually identical engine built under licence by Austin itself. In order to obtain some commercial benefit from the contract, Austin was given permission to use the design for a simplified civilian version to be sold as the Austin Champ. This version, designated model WN3, was mostly fitted with a modified Austin A90 Atlantic 4-cylinder engine as a cheaper option than the more complex B40 but the vehicle attracted few customers and only about 500 were built, the great majority of these being exported.

In military service, the vehicles were given the official designation FV1801A (Note: FV from "Fighting Vehicle") and were generally referred to as "Trucks, 1/4 ton, Austin". A few were fitted with additional equipment for use as field ambulances, telephone line-laying vehicles or equipped with armour and a .303 in Vickers medium machine gun or .303 Bren light machine gun utilising the built-in pintle mount forward of the windscreen, but the majority served as cargo/personnel carriers or were fitted with radios. A version armed with a single, dashboard-mounted .30 in Browning machine gun was in limited use as late as 1967.

As the Champ entered service it became apparent that although it had an outstanding cross-country performance, it was too expensive (£1200 at 1951 prices), too complex and had limited use outside of the narrow field combat role for which it had been designed. Consequently, the contract with Austin was amended and finally prematurely terminated some 4,000 vehicles short of the 15,000 originally contracted.

The Land Rover, which had entered army service before the Champ (as early as 1949), was half the price, simpler to maintain and could do 80% of the tasks the Champ could do. Ultimately it replaced the Champ in all roles. The Champ served with the British Army in the UK, Africa, Germany, Cyprus, Libya and the Suez Campaign, and early vehicles were sent for troop trials at the end of the Korean War. (Note: "16 para workshops REME used Champs in Cyprus and Jordan (57-60). They would pull 4 1/4 ton trailers on tarmac roads at about 30mph but in the desert sand they were too heavy and just dug in." Paddy Tharme RAOC s/sec)

The Champ cost far more than the Land Rover, and was never as popular with troops, probably because the Land Rover with its enclosed cab offered better protection from the elements and greater flexibility in use. With the reduction in size of the post-war army, many Champs were consigned to bulk vehicle storage and those employed in the Regular Army had relatively short careers before being redeployed to the Territorial Army. In the mid-1960s a decision was taken to withdraw the type from service completely, with all military Champs being sold off by 1968 although there is a record of one being sold by government auction as late as 1973. These mass sales made them cheap to buy (£150 being typical in 1966) and with fuel at low 1960s prices, many were bought as "fun" vehicles and used with little regard to the routine maintenance that the complex design required.

The only other forces to use the Champ were the Royal Marines who had 30 and the Australian Army who bought 400 new and about the same number of ex-British Army ones. One or two examples were also used by a mercenary unit in the Congo in the mid-1960s.

== Design ==
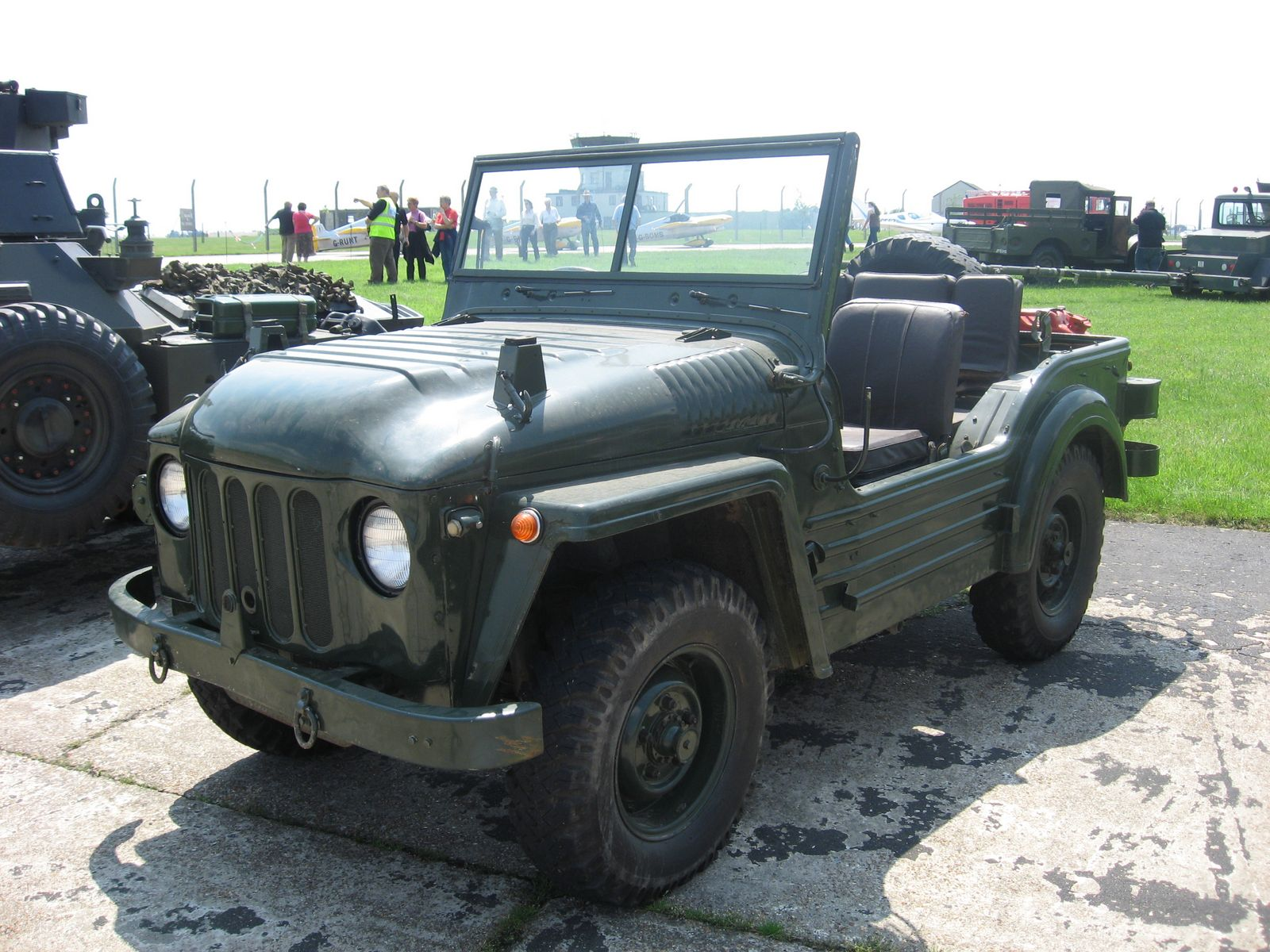
An Austin Champ

The engine was a four-cylinder in-line petrol unit of 2838 cc capacity (3.5-inch-diameter (89 mm) pistons × 4.5-inch (110 mm) stroke) designed by Rolls-Royce and was the smallest of the standardised B-Range military engines. These engines had their origin in a 1936 design produced at Derby, with the concept and dimensions first developed for the Rolls-Royce 20 HP of 1922, but with the demands of the war, development was not proceeded with until the late 1940s by the Rolls-Royce Chassis Division, then based at Clan Foundry in Belper. The engine was designed with absolute reliability as a prime criterion with fuel economy a secondary consideration, and using British Standard Fine (BSF) thread standards. A feature of this engine was the use of a cast aluminium cylinder head with screwed-in hardened steel valve seats.

With the adoption in 1949 of Unified thread standards, the engine was re-designed and simplified to ease manufacture; a cast-iron cylinder head was used in this version which can be most easily identified by the letters "UNF" cast or pressed into the rocker cover.

Rolls-Royce produced engines at Crewe early in the contract but did not have the capacity for volume production at the rate required, therefore Austin was lent tooling and licensed to build a virtually identical engine, and Austin-made engines were fitted in the great majority of Champs built. Cylinder blocks for both manufacturers were supplied by Leyland Motors.

The gearbox had five ratios with synchromesh on all gears. A conventional Borg & Beck clutch with mechanical linkage was used and drive from the gearbox was by shaft to the rear combined transfer box and differential assembly which incorporated reverse gear, thereby allowing five reverse gears also, and then by a long shaft to the front differential which incorporated a simple dog clutch to enable four-wheel drive when required. A conventional separate transfer case was not possible due to the cruciform layout of the vehicle chassis which placed the junction of the cruciform where the transfer box would reside on a conventional ladder-type chassis. Bendix "Tracta" type constant velocity joints were fitted at all wheel stations. All transmission assemblies were sealed against the entry of water.

The suspension system was based on longitudinal torsion bars, similar to that used for the front suspension on the Morris Minor, for primary springing and featured fully independent suspension at all four wheels using double wishbones. Each wheel station was also fitted with a rubber cone and cup system to buffer extreme upward suspension travel with energy control exercised by double-acting telescopic hydraulic dampers. This system gave an exceptional cross-country performance. Front and rear axles were constructed into a cradle sub-assembly, which could be rapidly exchanged in the field.

The braking system was supplied by Girling and employed drums and a simple single-line hydraulic layout without power assistance.

The engine, fuel system and all electrical items were waterproofed so the vehicle could wade to a depth of 6 feet (2 m) with minimal preparation; a snorkel attached to the air cleaner and normally carried horizontally on the right wing (US = fender) could be raised during wading operations. Maintaining this level of capability was found to be expensive and of limited value, and the policy of CT vehicles was abandoned in 1956 and the CT family were downgraded to General Service (GS) status.

Electrical equipment fitted on military Champs was a 24-volt system in accordance with agreements reached in 1948 with the US and Canadian armies and comprised standardised military pattern equipment used on many British post-war vehicles, supplied by Lucas, CAV, Delco-Remy and Simms. Instrumentation was a system common to many other military vehicles of the period and supplied by Smiths Instruments of London.

The body was a utilitarian open four-seater tub of welded pressed steel panels, supplied by the Pressed Steel Company, and similar in style to the war-time Jeep layout although unlike the Jeep, the Champ body is designed to carry part of the vehicle stresses and chassis flexing. A simple hood (top) made from PVC coated cloth (trade name Rexine) was provided and a set of weather screens with hinged doors on a simple frame were available for issue in intemperate climates. The inner windscreen opened forwards for ventilation or the whole frame and glass assembly could be folded down onto the bonnet (hood). Military items such as a shovel, pickaxe and a carrier for a standard 20-litre jerrycan (for the carriage of water not fuel) were normally fitted. A 20-gallon (91 litre) fuel tank was located at the rear of the vehicle, giving an operational range of approximately 300 miles.

Various bolt-on kits were produced to convert basic vehicles for specialist roles, for example tactical radio carrier, telephone line laying, field ambulance with two stretchers, and an appliqué armour kit. Strangely, the armour components were listed in the Austin civilian parts catalogue but not in the army one. A standard radio fitting kit for 1/4-ton vehicles comprising a 50-inch table running on sliding runners, battery mountings and appropriate fittings was introduced in 1956. When this kit was fitted, the vehicle was re-designated as Fitted For Radio (FFR) to differentiate it from the basic FFW version.

Some prototype vehicles with a Land Rover-style rear body with tailgate rear access were constructed in an attempt to improve the versatility of the basic design but were not put into production.

== Civilian version ==
Champs made for the civilian market (model WN3) could be specified with the Rolls-Royce engine or, as was much more usual, a modified version of Austin's 2660 cc A90 engine. Military body fittings such as rifle clips were omitted and the windscreen was a fixed assembly. Commercial 12-volt electrical components by Lucas Industries were provided and facilities for power take-off, driven from the transfer box, were available.

Around 500 of the civilian version are thought to have been made, including at least one left-hand-drive version. They were priced at £750 in November 1952, and at £1000 in November 1954. Many went to Australia, where some can still be found. Two are known to have survived in the UK. Some of the design features of the Champ were carried over to the Austin Gipsy, of which some 21,000 were made from 1958 to 1967.

The civilian WN3 was adapted as a small fire engine by Fire Armour Ltd of London for use in commercial premises and for locations where large vehicle access was difficult. This version was known as the Firefly and carried a 60-gallon water tank, pump and ladders. One still exists today in preservation. Specialist chemical incident and a light rescue version were offered by the company.

== Specifications ==
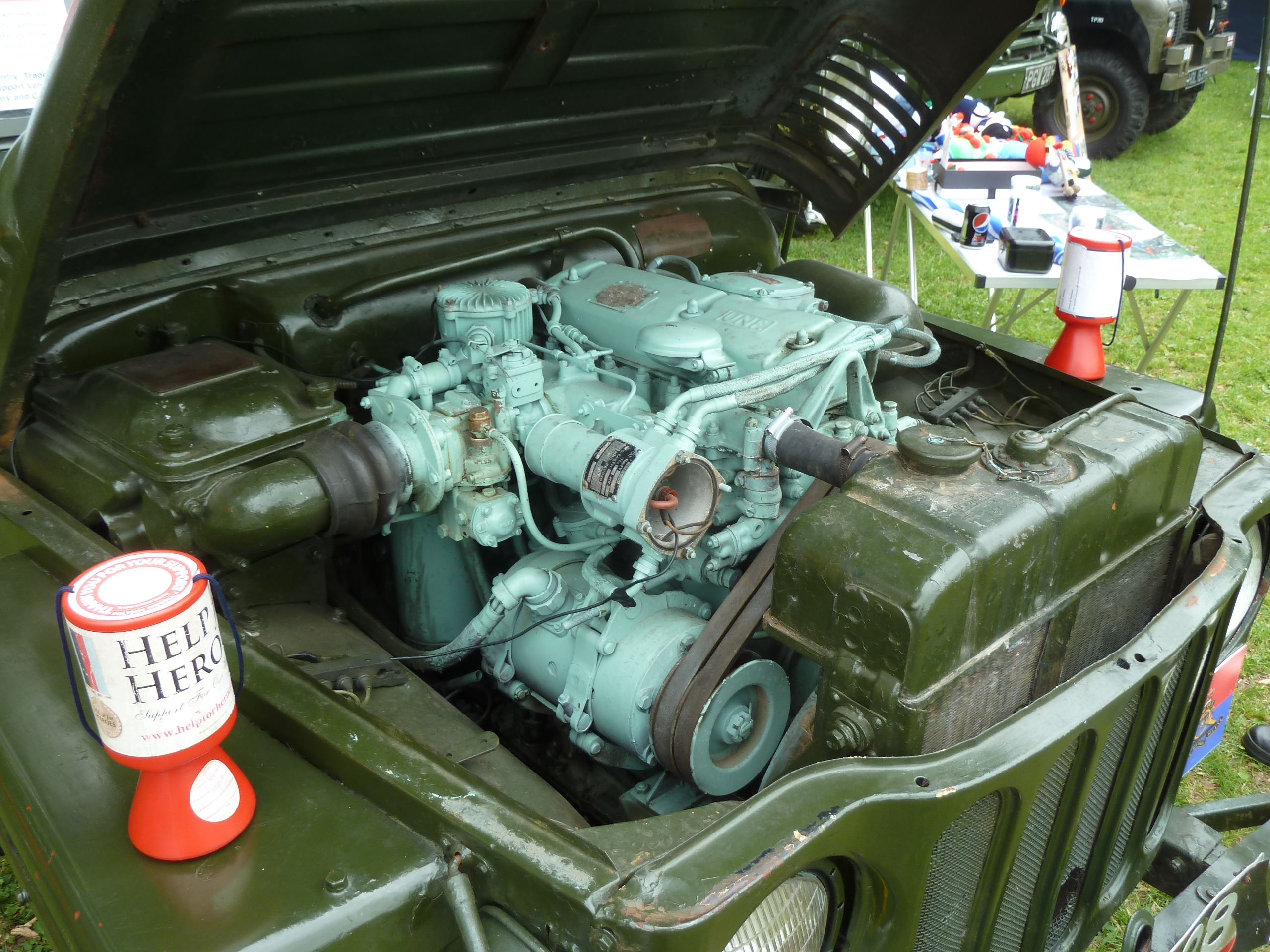
Austin Champ Rolls Royce B40

- Engine:
  - FV1801 (Military): Rolls-Royce B40, either built by RR (4 digit engine numbers) or by Austin (5 digit engine numbers)
  - Champ (civilian): Austin A90 engine or the B40
