= Guppy (surname) =

Guppy is a surname. Notable people with the surname include:

== People ==
- Darius Guppy (born 1964), insurance fraudster
- Eileen Guppy (1903–1980), British geologist
- Elisabeth Guppy (1838–1917), British spiritualist medium
- Henry B. Guppy (1854–1926), British botanist
- Henry Guppy (librarian) (1861–1948), British librarian
- John Guppy (politician) (1874–1937), fisherman, farmer and political figure in Newfoundland
- John Guppy (businessman), British businessman
- Lechmere Guppy (1836–1916), British naturalist; discoverer and namesake of the fish
- Sarah Guppy (1770–1852), British inventor
- Shusha Guppy (1935–2008), author, editor, singer and filmmaker
- Steve Guppy (born 1969), English retired footballer
- Wayne Guppy (born 1954), New Zealand politician

== Fictional characters ==
- Mr (William) Guppy, from the novel Bleak House
