= Austin Ant =

English motor vehicle

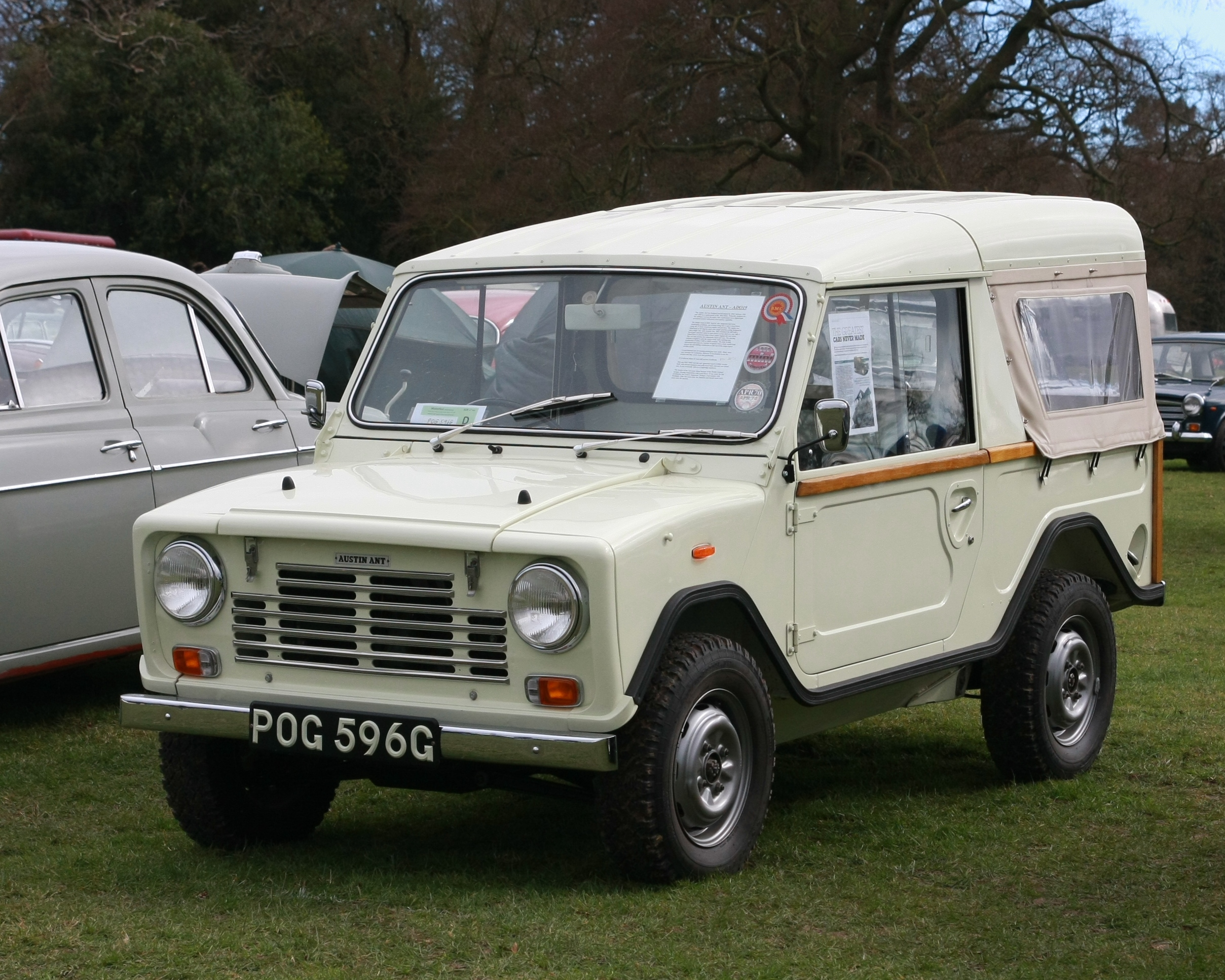

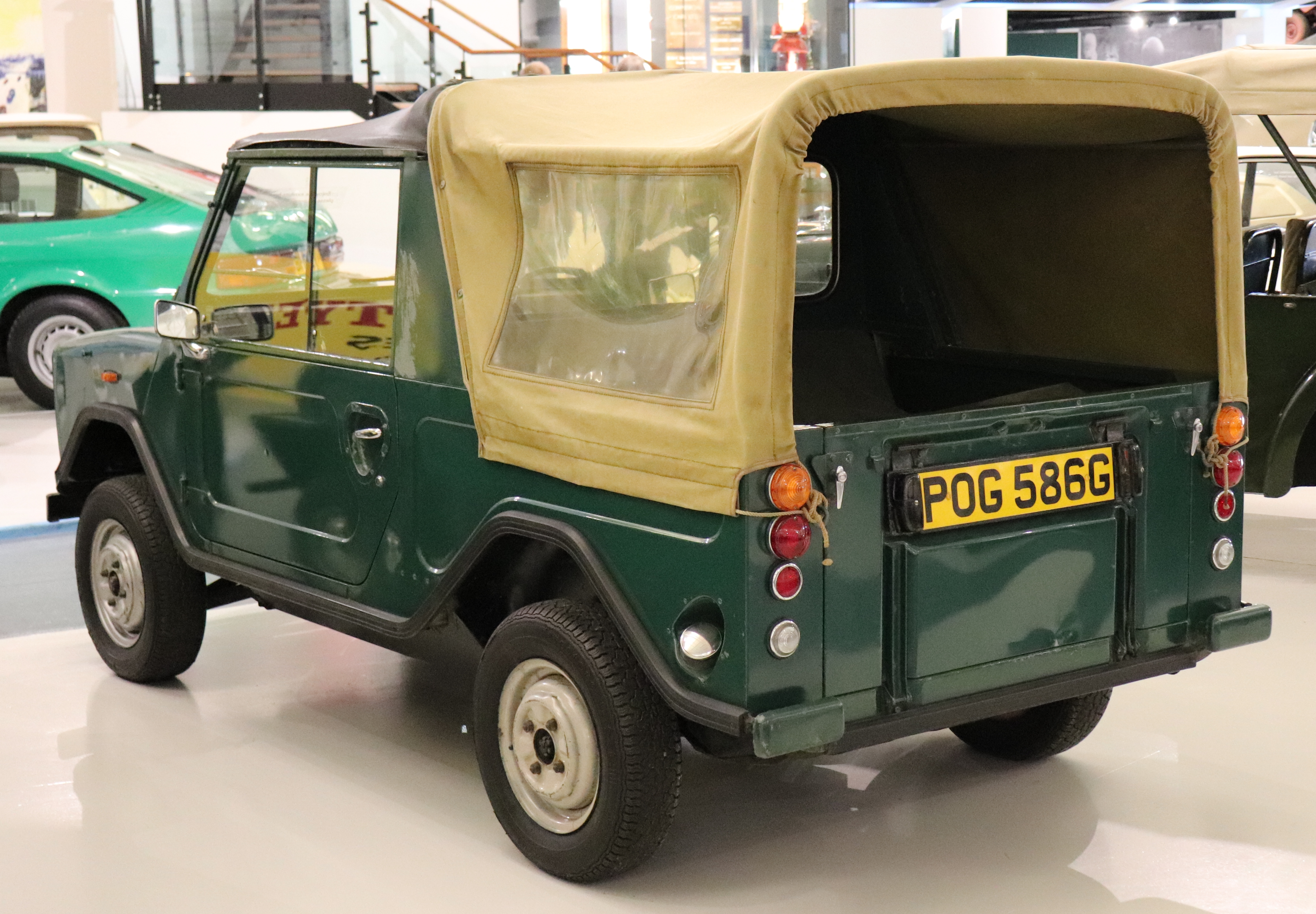
Austin Ant aka ADO19

The Austin Ant (development code ADO19) is a small four-wheel drive vehicle that was designed by Sir Alec Issigonis for the motor manufacturer Austin. Although the Ant is widely regarded as a military vehicle, some sources suggest it was conceived with civilian use in mind as well. In its military role, it was a potential successor to the military version of an earlier Issigonis design, the Mini Moke.

The Ant was cancelled in 1968 before full-scale production began, during the period when BMC became part of the British Leyland (BL) conglomerate; the merger caused several overlaps in model ranges, and the Ant was regarded as too close a competitor for the Land Rover range.

The Ant used an A-Series engine, transverse mounted and tilted slightly backward to allow greater ground clearance and suspension movement. The main gearbox was placed in the engine sump, as on the Mini. A reduction gearbox took power from the main gearbox to the rear axle via a propshaft. The same layout was used 30 years later (with a K-Series engine) on the Rover Group's Land Rover Freelander.

== See also ==
- Nuffield Guppy
