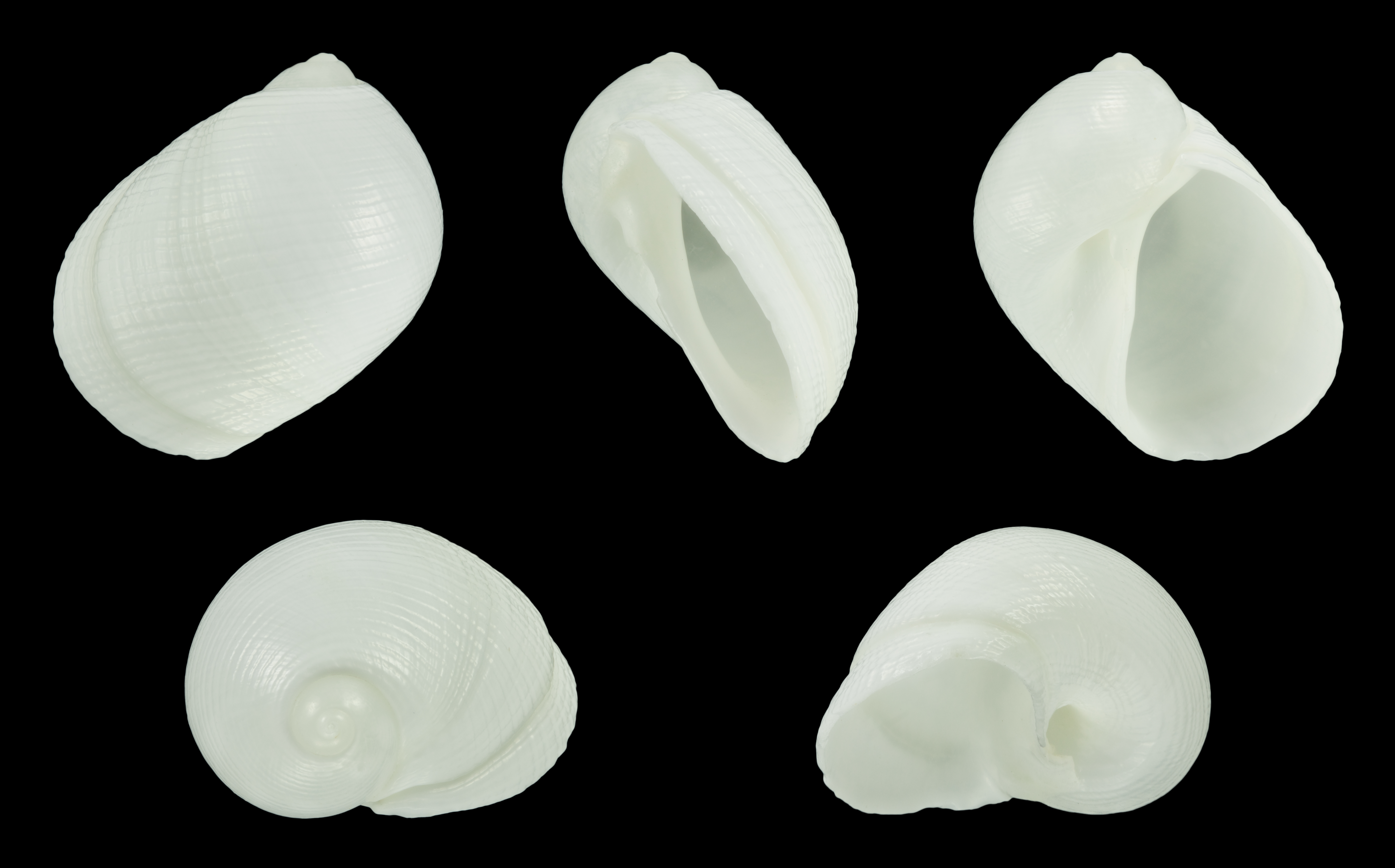

Scientific classification
- Kingdom: Animalia
- Phylum: Mollusca
- Class: Gastropoda
- Subclass: Caenogastropoda
- Order: Littorinimorpha
- Family: Naticidae
- Genus: Eunaticina
- Species: E. papilla

Binomial name
- Eunaticina papilla (Gmelin, 1790)

Synonyms
- Albula tranquebarica Röding, 1798; Natica cancellata Swainson, W.A., 1840; Natica costulata Quoy & Gaimard, 1833; Natica papilla Gmelin, 1791; Natica tranquebarica Röding, P.F., 1798; Naticaria cancellata Swainson, 1840 (Objective synonym); Nerita papilla Gmelin, 1791 (basionym); Pervisinum dingeldii Iredale, 1931; Propesinum flindersi Cotton & Godfrey, 1931; Sigaretus acuminatus A. Adams & Reeve, 1850; † Sigaretus cinctus Hutton, 1885; Sigaretus coarctatus Reeve, 1864; Sigaretus lamarckianus Récluz, 1843; Sigaretus linneanus Récluz, 1843; Sigaretus nitidus Reeve, 1864; Sigaretus oblongus Reeve, 1864; Sigaretus papilla (Gmelin, 1791); Sigaretus tumescens Reeve, 1864; Sinum papilla (Gmelin, 1791); Sinum papilla var. madoerensis van Regteren Altena, 1941; Sinum tener (Smith, 1894)

= Eunaticina papilla =

Species of gastropod

Eunaticina papilla, the papilla moon snail, is a species of predatory sea snail, a marine gastropod mollusk in the family Naticidae, the moon snails.

== Description ==
The size of an adult shell varies between 8 mm and 35 mm.

== Distribution ==
This species occurs in the Red Sea, in the Indian Ocean along Madagascar and in the Pacific Ocean along Melanesia.
