= Austin Gipsy =

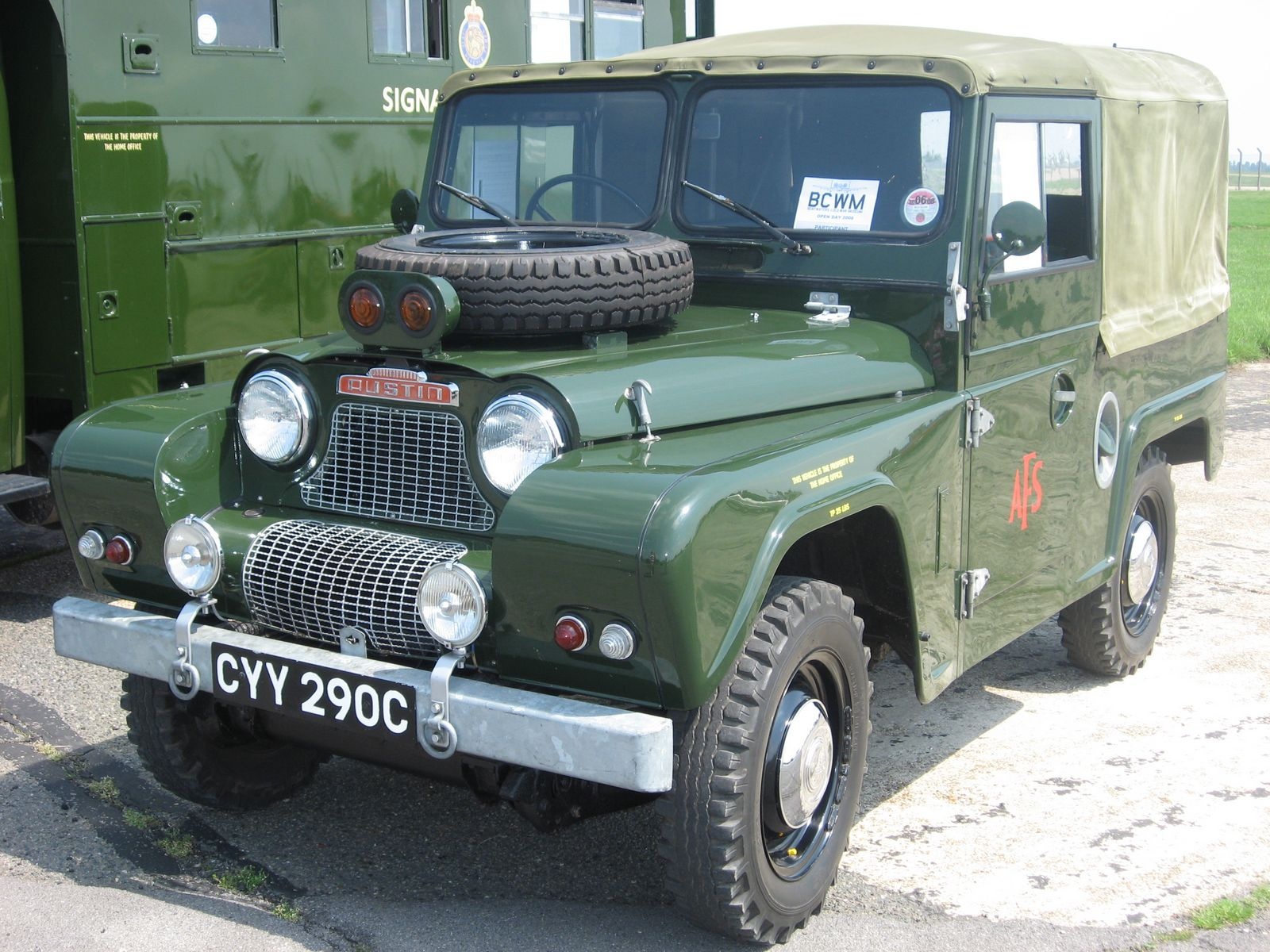

Overview
- Manufacturer: Austin (BMC)
- Production: 1958–1968
- Assembly: United Kingdom; New Zealand; Australia: Sydney; Colombia: Bogotá

Body and chassis
- Body style: Four-wheel drive

Powertrain
- Engine: Austin (A70) OHV petrol diesel 2200cc

Dimensions
- Length: 139 or 160 in (3,531 or 4,064 mm)

Chronology
- Predecessor: Austin Champ
- Successor: Land Rover

The Austin Gipsy (Note: Austin spelled "Gipsy" with an "i"; the much later Maruti Suzuki Gypsy off-road vehicle used a "y".) is an off-road vehicle produced by Austin from 1958 to 1968. It was designed as a lower-cost replacement for the Austin Champ, to compete directly with Rover's Land Rover. Like the Land Rover, it was aimed at both the civilian and military markets.

== History ==
Post-war, the FV1800 Nuffield Mudlark, later to become the FV1801 Austin Champ, had been designed as the first of the new CT series of soft-skin military vehicles for the British Army. The Mudlark used the new Rolls-Royce B40 engine, all-independent suspension based on Tracta joints and a 24V electrical system with a two-speed high-capacity generator capable of powering a FFW version. Despite these technical features, the resultant vehicle was not popular or successful, being seen as over-complicated, and a maintenance and repair nightmare. The Champ was also expensive, compared to simpler vehicles. The later Gipsy was a reaction to both the failure of the Champ, and the success of the Land Rover.

Both the Champ and the Gipsy were significantly different from the American Jeep, the Gipsy being much closer in design, appearance and price to the Land Rover.

Unlike the Land Rover, the Gipsy's bodywork was steel. The suspension was sophisticated, independent suspension all round using "Flexitor" rubber springs developed by Alex Moulton, giving the Gipsy the ability to travel at high speeds over rough terrain. In due course, later models offered leaf springs as an option on the front and rear. It used a BMC 2199 cc petrol engine based on the one in the Austin A70; the compression ratio was 6.8:1, making the petrol-powered vehicle tolerant of low octane fuel. A 2178 cc diesel-engined version was also offered. Power outputs are 62 bhp (46 kW) for the petrol engine, 55 bhp (41 kW) for the diesel unit. The Gipsy was first available with a 90-inch (2,300 mm) short wheelbase (SWB). A 111-inch (2,800 mm) long wheelbase (LWB) version became available from Series II.

When BMC merged with Leyland to form British Leyland, the Austin Gipsy and the Land Rover were being produced by the same company. Production of the Gipsy was stopped after some 21,208 vehicles had been sold.

The Austin Gipsy was assembled from CKD packs in New Zealand at the Austin distributor's Petone factory which was directly opposite Todd Motor's assembly plant for Rootes Group and Chrysler Australia's products. Austin Maxis were later assembled in the same factory.

== See also ==
- List of Austin motor vehicles
