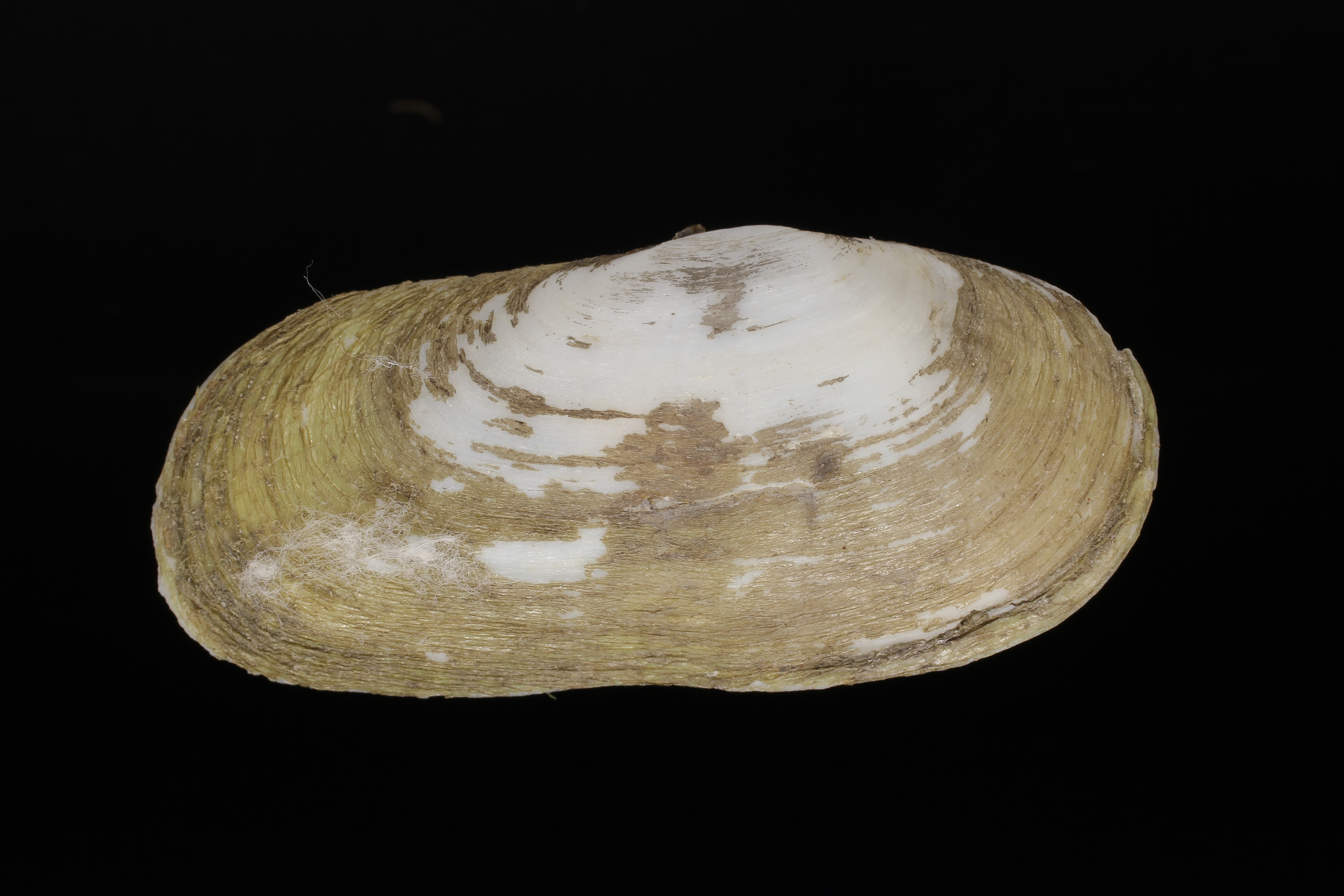
- Solecurtus markushuberi

Scientific classification
- Kingdom: Animalia
- Phylum: Mollusca
- Class: Bivalvia
- Order: Cardiida
- Family: Solecurtidae
- Genus: Solecurtus; Blainville, 1824

Type species
- Solen strigilatus Linnaeus, 1758

Species
- See text

Synonyms
- Adasius Leach, 1852 (junior objective synonym of Solecurtus); Macha Oken, 1835 (junior objective synonym of Solecurtus); Psammosolen Risso, 1826; Solenocurtus P. Fischer, 1887 (unjustified emendation of Solecurtus)

= Solecurtus =

Genus of bivalves

Solecurtus is a genus of saltwater clam, a marine bivalve molluscs in the family Solecurtidae.

== Species ==
The World Register of Marine Species includes the following species in the genus :

- Solecurtus afroccidentalis Cosel, 1989
- Solecurtus australis (Dunker, 1862)
- Solecurtus baldwini Dall, Bartsch & Rehder, 1938
- †Solecurtus bensoni Finlay, 1924
- Solecurtus broggii Pilsbry & Olsson, 1941
- Solecurtus candidus (Brocchi, 1814)
- † Solecurtus chattonensis Finlay, 1924
- Solecurtus consimilis Kuroda & Habe in Habe, 1961
- Solecurtus cumingianus (Dunker, 1862)
- Solecurtus divaricatus (Lischke, 1869)
- † Solecurtus evolutus Finlay, 1924
- Solecurtus exaratus (Philippi, 1849)
- Solecurtus guaymasensis (Lowe, 1935)
- Solecurtus leone Woolacott, 1954
- Solecurtus lineatus (Spengler, 1794)
- Solecurtus markushuberi Thach, 2020
- † Solecurtus murrayvianus Finlay, 1927
- Solecurtus philippinarum (Dunker, 1862)
- Solecurtus quaeritus M. Huber, 2010
- Solecurtus rhombus (Spengler, 1794)
- Solecurtus sagamiensis Kuroda & Habe in Kuroda & al., 1971
- Solecurtus sanctaemarthae d'Orbigny, 1853
- Solecurtus scopula (Turton, 1822)
- Solecurtus strigilatus (Linnaeus, 1758)
- Solecurtus subcandidus Sturany, 1899
- Solecurtus sulcatus (Dunker, 1862)

Taxon inquirendum

- Solecurtus debilis Gould, 1861

== Synonyms ==
- Solecurtus abbreviatus Gould, 1861: synonym of Azorinus abbreviatus (Gould, 1861)
- Solecurtus affinis C. B. Adams, 1852: synonym of Tagelus affinis (C. B. Adams, 1852) (original combination)
- Solecurtus albus Blainville, 1827: synonym of Solecurtus scopula (W. Turton, 1822)
- Solecurtus angulatus G. B. Sowerby II, 1874: synonym of Tagelus adansonii (Bosc, 1801)
- Solecurtus bidens (Hanley, 1842): synonym of Tagelus divisus (Spengler, 1794)
- Solecurtus californianus Conrad, 1837: synonym of Tagelus californianus (Conrad, 1837) (original combination)
- Solecurtus chamasolen (da Costa, 1778): synonym of Azorinus chamasolen (da Costa, 1778)
- Solecurtus coquimbensis G. B. Sowerby II, 1874: synonym of Tagelus dombeii (Lamarck, 1818)
- Solecurtus cylindricus G. B. Sowerby II, 1874: synonym of Tagelus affinis (C. B. Adams, 1852) (uncertain synonym)
- Solecurtus dombeyi: synonym of Tagelus dombeii (Lamarck, 1818) (incorrect subsequent spelling)
- Solecurtus dunkeri Kira, 1959: synonym of Solecurtus divaricatus (Lischke, 1869)
- Solecurtus ellipticus Tate, 1887 †: synonym of Solecurtus murrayvianus Finlay, 1927 † (invalid, not Dana, 1849)
- Solecurtus lucidus Conrad, 1837: synonym of Siliqua lucida (Conrad, 1837) (original combination)
- Solecurtus mollis G. B. Sowerby II, 1874: synonym of Sinonovacula mollis (G. B. Sowerby II, 1874)
- Solecurtus multistriatus (Scacchi, 1835): synonym of Solecurtus scopula (W. Turton, 1822)
- Solecurtus nitidus Gould, 1840: synonym of Siliqua squama (Blainville, 1827)
- Solecurtus novaculina G. B. Sowerby II, 1874: synonym of Novaculina gangetica Benson, 1830
- Solecurtus nuttallii Conrad, 1837: synonym of Siliqua patula (Dixon, 1789)
- Solecurtus pacificus Abbott & Dance, 1986: synonym of Solecurtus rhombus (Spengler, 1794)
- Solecurtus platensis d'Orbigny, 1846: synonym of Tagelus plebeius ([Lightfoot], 1786)
- Solecurtus politus Carpenter, 1857: synonym of Tagelus politus (Carpenter, 1857) (original combination)
- Solecurtus quoyi Deshayes, 1835: synonym of Solecurtus rhombus (Spengler, 1794)
- Solecurtus sanctaemarthae G. B. Sowerby II, 1874: synonym of Solecurtus rhombus (Spengler, 1794)
- Solecurtus solidus Gray G. B. Sowerby II, 1874: synonym of Azorinus abbreviatus (Gould, 1861)
- Solecurtus squama Blainville, 1827: synonym of Siliqua squama (Blainville, 1827)
- Solecurtus strigillatus [sic]: synonym of Solecurtus strigilatus (Linnaeus, 1758) (misspelling of Solenocurtus strigilatus (Linnaeus, 1758))
- Solecurtus strigosus Gould, 1861: synonym of Pharella acutidens (Broderip & Sowerby, 1829)
- Solecurtus subteres Conrad, 1837: synonym of Tagelus subteres (Conrad, 1837)
- Solecurtus tenerior Hedley, 1914: synonym of Cultellus tenerior (Hedley, 1914) (original combination)
- Solecurtus violascens Carpenter, 1857: synonym of Tagelus californianus (Conrad, 1837)
- Solecurtus viridens G. B. Sowerby II, 1874: synonym of Tagelus divisus (Spengler, 1794)
