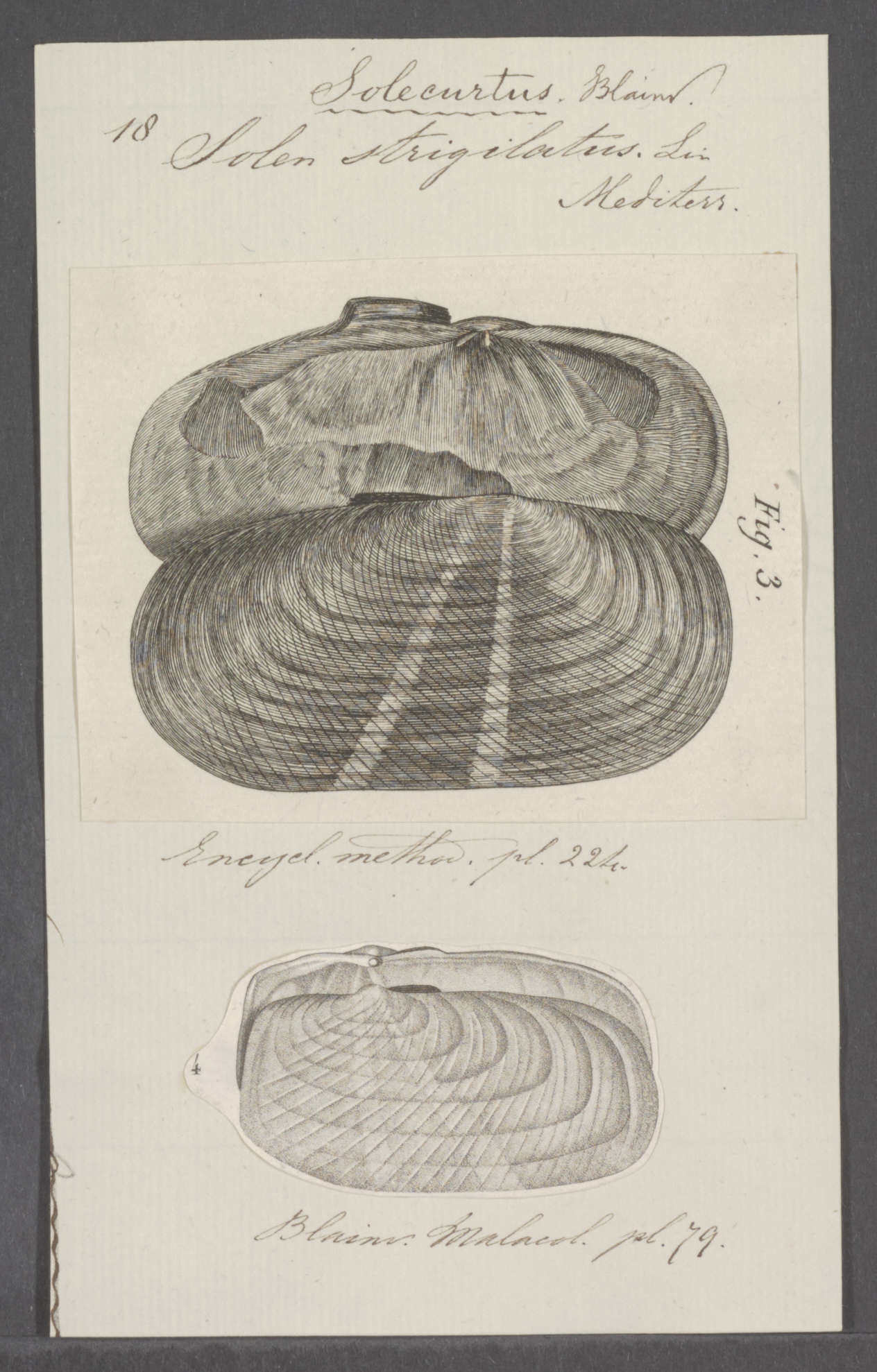
- S. strigilatus in Iconographia Zoologica, a 19th-century collection of zoological images

Scientific classification
- Kingdom: Animalia
- Phylum: Mollusca
- Class: Bivalvia
- Order: Cardiida
- Superfamily: Tellinoidea
- Family: Solecurtidae
- Genus: Solecurtus
- Species: S. strigilatus

Binomial name
- Solecurtus strigilatus (Linnaeus, 1758)

Synonyms
- Solecurtus strigillatus [sic] (misspelling (Linnaeus, 1758)); Solen strigilatus Linnaeus, 1758 (original)

= Solecurtus strigilatus =

Species of bivalve

Solecurtus strigilatus, also known as the rosy razor clam, is a species of saltwater clam, a marine bivalve mollusc in the family Solecurtidae. This mollusc is a suspension feeder and can burrow with great rapidity to escape predators. It is an unusual bivalve in that its shell valves are too small to contain all the soft tissue, and the animal is unable to retreat into its shell.

== Description ==
The valves of the rosy razor clam are relatively small, thin and finely sculptured. At the anterior end of the animal there is a strong, protruding foot. At the posterior end, is the large mantle sac containing the gills; when relaxed, it protrudes and is twice the length of the valves, but it can be contracted back between the valves. Posterior to this are the two robust, contractile siphons. The maximum length of the shell is 8 cm (3 in).

Right and left valve of the same specimen:

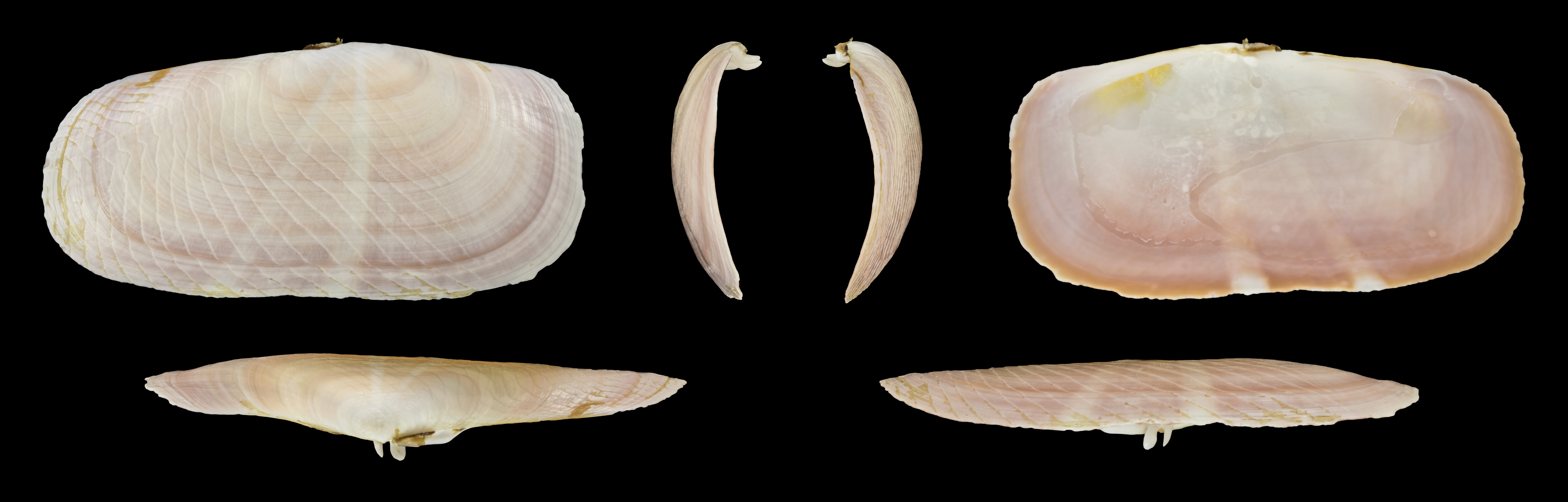
Right valve

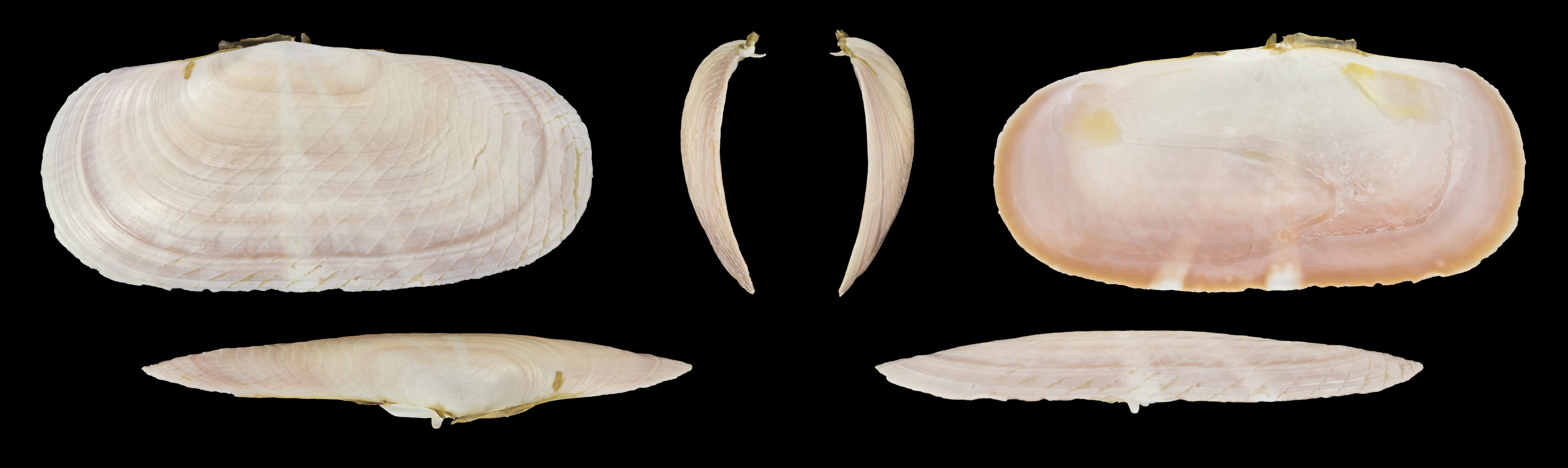
Left valve

== Distribution ==
The rosy razor clam occurs in the Mediterranean Sea and the adjoining part of the Atlantic Ocean. It is present from the lower shore down to the shallow sublittoral zone.

== Behaviour and ecology ==
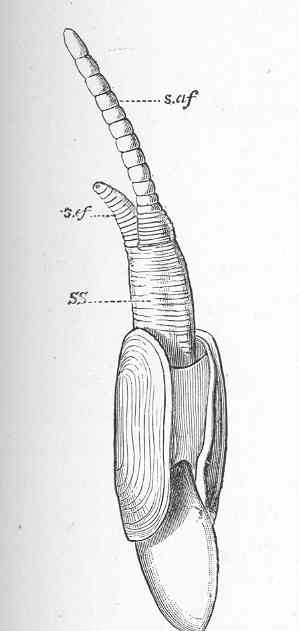
Siphons and mantle sac at the top, foot below

The species lives immersed in soft sediment, usually medium-grade sand. The burrow is J-shaped and has a mucus lining. The clam has two siphons which it can extend to the surface in order to feed, but when not feeding it burrows further into the sediment, often living 50 cm (20 in) under the sand surface. Many clams are detritivores, consuming decomposing organic matter they find in their environment, but this clam is a filter feeder, drawing water in through one siphon, removing the edible particles and exhaling the water through the other siphon. It can dig through the sand with great rapidity, and any attempt by humans to dig it out results in it descending diagonally, even deeper into the sediment. In an apparent attempt to distract predators, the tips of the two siphons can be shed, and these pulsate as they drift in the water column. The ends of the siphons can be regenerated. The presence of this clam in the sediment is evidenced by two circular holes each 1 cm (0.4 in) wide and 2 cm (0.8 in) apart, through which the siphons can be projected.

Digging is a five-phase process; the mantle sac and siphons fill with water and the foot remains contracted; the siphons close, forcing water into the mantle sac while the foot unfolds; the mantle sac contracts, directing a jet of water in front of the foot; the foot is pushed into the loosened sediment; the tip of the foot expands to provide an anchor and the body is drawn down, ready to start the next cycle.
