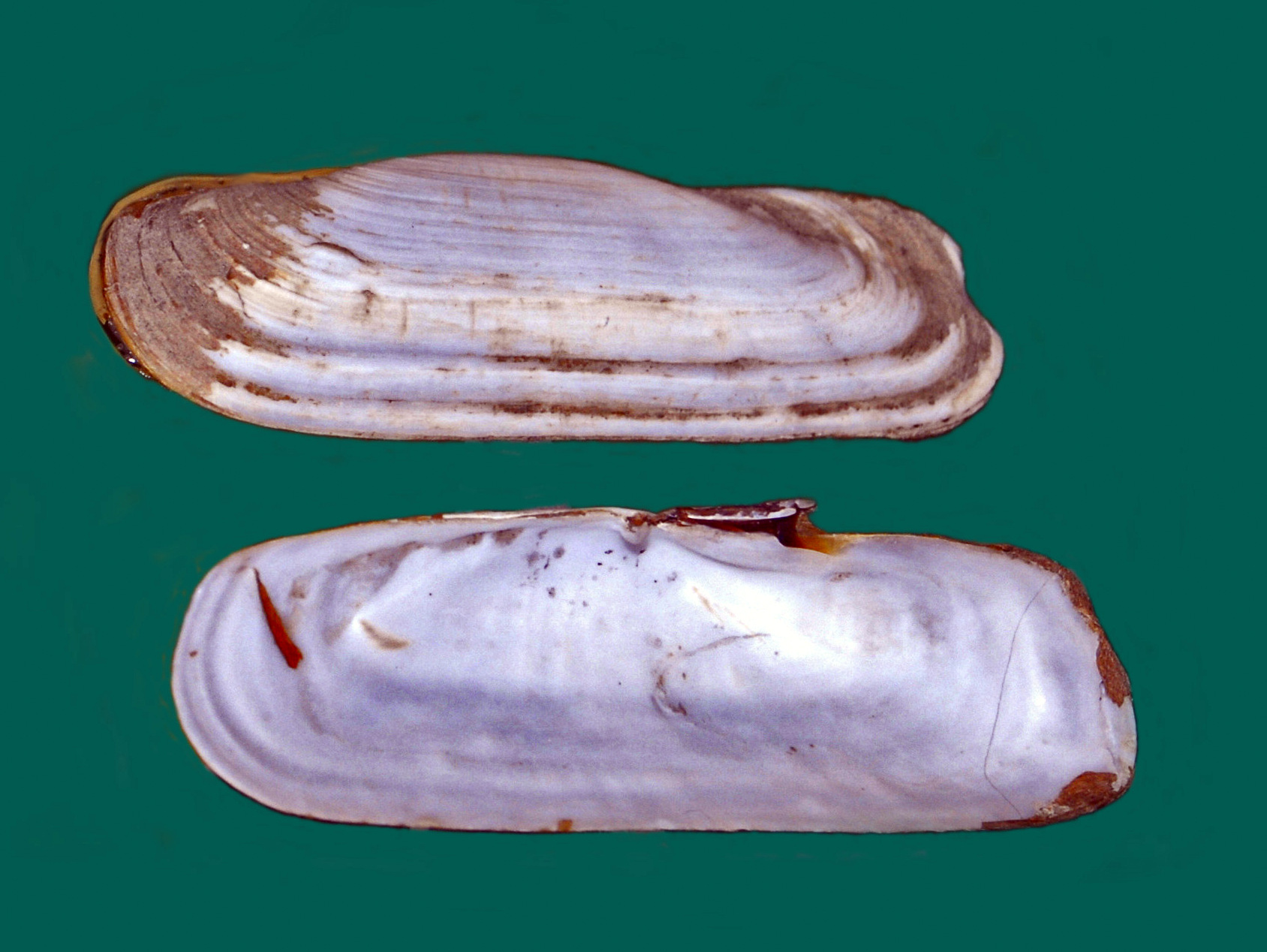
- A view of valves of Tagelus californianus

Scientific classification
- Domain: Eukaryota
- Kingdom: Animalia
- Phylum: Mollusca
- Class: Bivalvia
- Order: Cardiida
- Family: Solecurtidae
- Genus: Tagelus
- Species: T. californianus

Binomial name
- Tagelus californianus (Conrad, 1837)

Synonyms
- Solecurtus californianus Conrad, 1837; Solecurtus violascens Carpenter, 1857; Tagelus violascens (Carpenter, 1857)

= Tagelus californianus =

Species of bivalve

Tagelus californianus, common name California tagelus, is a species of saltwater clams, marine bivalve mollusks belonging to the family Solecurtidae.

== Distribution ==
This species can be found in the Eastern Pacific from the Gulf of California to Oregon.

== Description ==
Shells of Tagelus californianus can reach a length of 130 millimetres (5.1 in) and a height of about 33 millimetres (1.3 in). These shells are yellowish-white, with rust-colored stains and a dark periostracum. The posterior margin is slightly sinuous.
