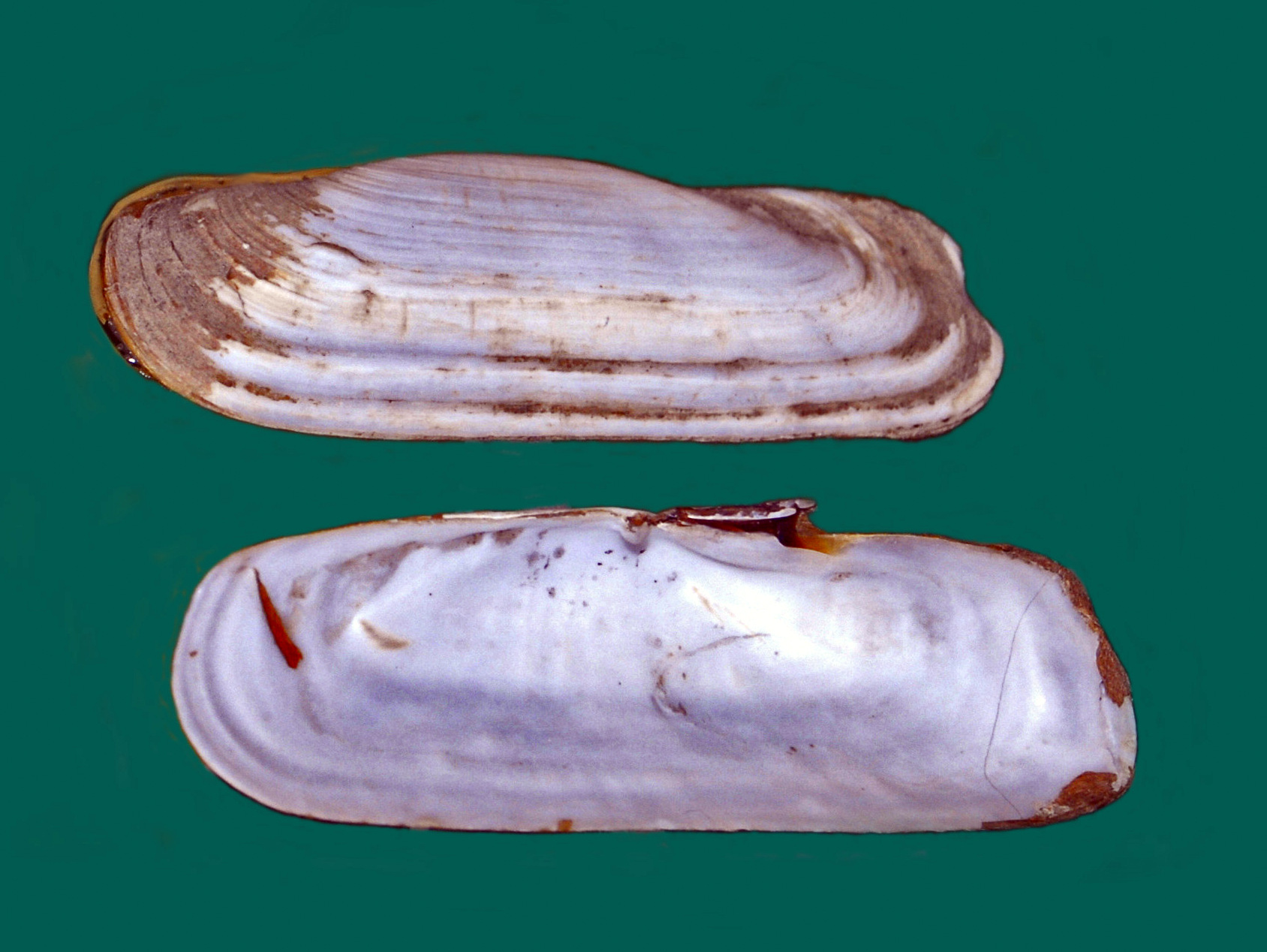
- Tagelus californianus

Scientific classification
- Domain: Eukaryota
- Kingdom: Animalia
- Phylum: Mollusca
- Class: Bivalvia
- Order: Cardiida
- Family: Solecurtidae
- Genus: Tagelus; Gray, 1847

= Tagelus =

Genus of bivalves

Tagelus is a genus of saltwater clams, marine bivalve molluscs belonging to the family Solecurtidae.

== Species ==
- Tagelus adansonii (Bosc, 1801)
- Tagelus affinis (C. B. Adams, 1852)
- Tagelus californianus (Conrad, 1837)
- Tagelus divisus (Spengler, 1794)
- Tagelus dombeii (Lamarck, 1818)
- Tagelus longisinuatus Pilsbry & Lowe, 1932
- Tagelus peruanus (Dunker, 1862)
- Tagelus peruvianus Pilsbry & Olsson, 1941
- Tagelus plebeius (Lightfoot, 1786)
- Tagelus politus (Carpenter, 1857)
- Tagelus subteres (Conrad, 1837)
