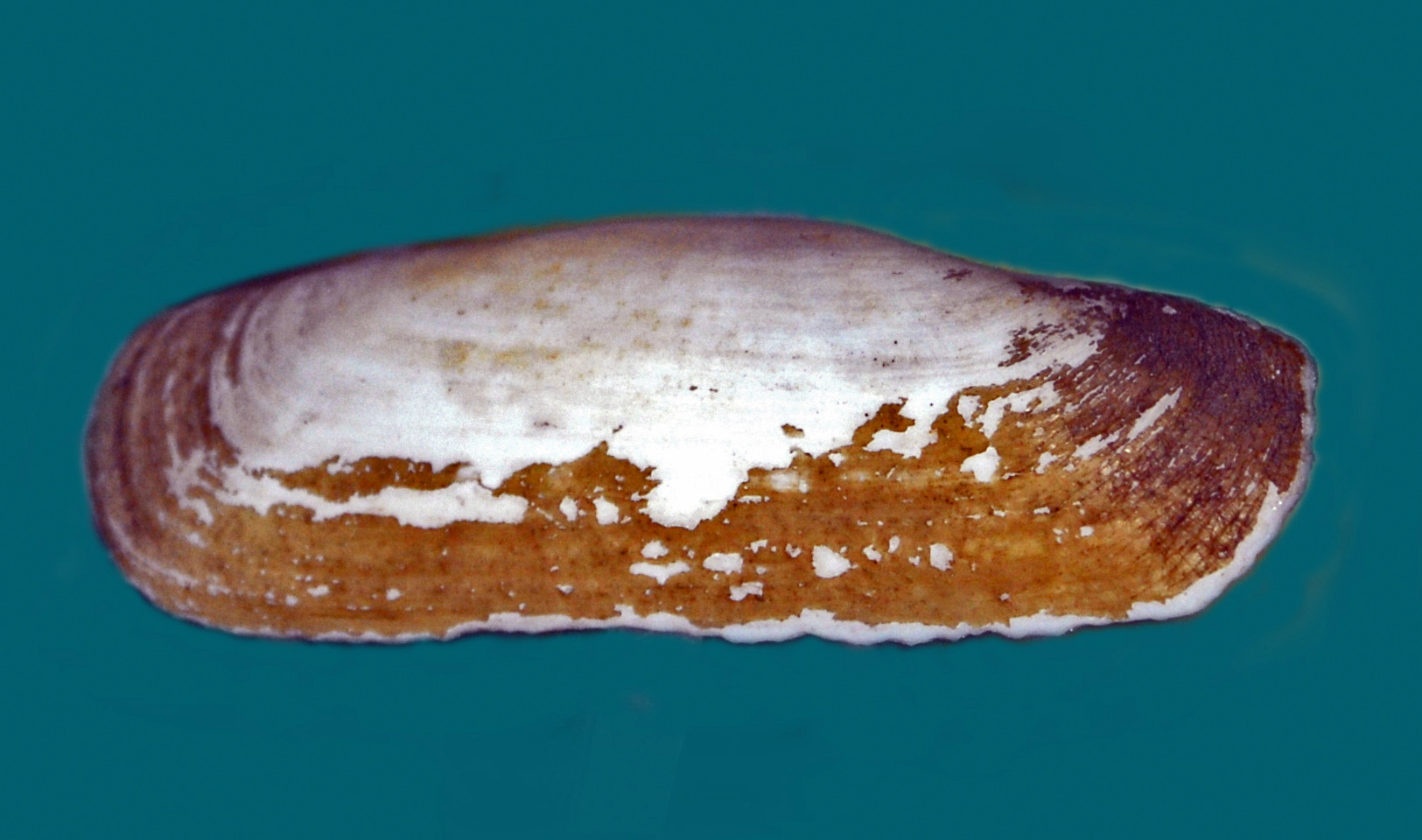

Scientific classification
- Domain: Eukaryota
- Kingdom: Animalia
- Phylum: Mollusca
- Class: Bivalvia
- Order: Cardiida
- Family: Solecurtidae
- Genus: Tagelus
- Species: T. subteres

Binomial name
- Tagelus subteres (Conrad, 1837)

Synonyms
- Solecurtus subteres Conrad, 1837

= Tagelus subteres =

Species of bivalve

Tagelus subteres, common name lesser tagelus, is a species of saltwater clam, a marine bivalve mollusc belonging to the family Solecurtidae.

== Description ==
Shells of Tagelus subteres can reach a length of 43 millimetres (1.7 in). These small and compact shells show violet rays and a glossy periostracum.

== Distribution ==
This species can be found in the East Pacific.
