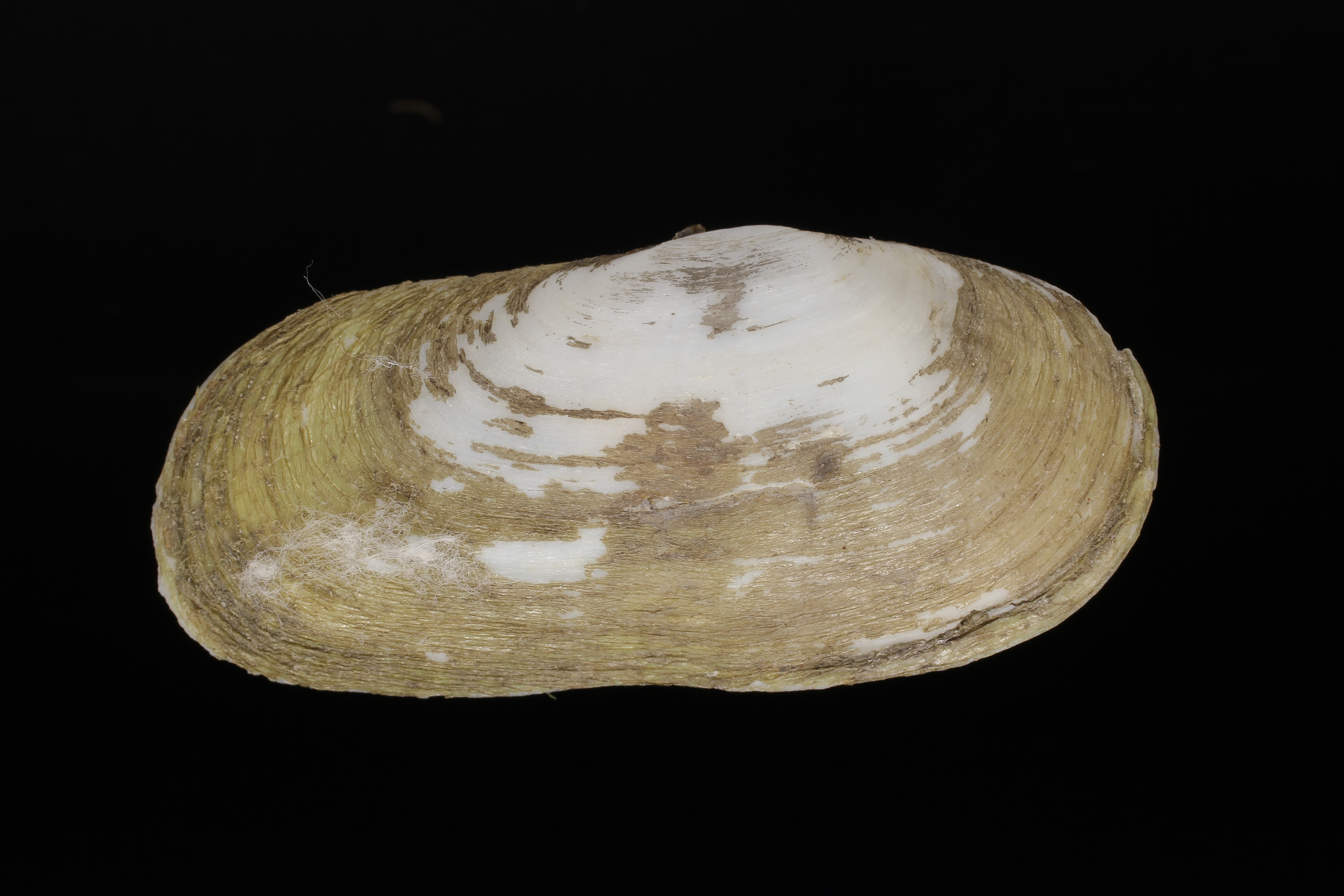
- Solecurtus markushuberi

Scientific classification
- Kingdom: Animalia
- Phylum: Mollusca
- Class: Bivalvia
- Order: Cardiida
- Superfamily: Tellinoidea
- Family: Solecurtidae; Orbigny, 1846

Genera
- See text

= Solecurtidae =

Family of bivalves

The Solecurtidae are a family of saltwater clams, marine bivalve molluscs in the order Cardiida.

== Genera ==
Genera in the family Solenidae include:

- Azorinus Récluz, 1869
- Clunaculum Dall, 1899
- Solecurtus Blainville, 1824
- Tagelus Gray, 1847
