= List of prehistoric foraminifera genera =

This is a list of fossil genera of foraminiferans.

== A ==
- Abadehella
- Abathomphalus
- Abditodentrix
- Abdullaevia
- Abrardia
- Abyssamina
- Acarinina
- Accordiella
- Acervoschwagerina
- Acervulina
- Aciculella
- Acostina
- Acruliammina
- Actinocyclina
- Actinosiphon
- Adelosina
- Adelungia
- Adercotryma
- Adhaerentia
- Adraheutina
- Aeolisaccus
- Aeolostreptis
- Affinetrina
- Afghanella
- Afrobolivina
- Agathammina
- Agathamminoides
- Agglutinella
- Agglutisolena
- Akiyoshiella
- Aktinorbitoides
- Alabamina
- Alabaminoides
- Aleomorphella
- Alfredina
- Alliatina
- Alliatinella
- Allomorphina
- Allomorphinella
- Almaena
- Alpillina
- Alpinophragmium
- Altasterella
- Altinerina
- Altistoma
- Alveocyclammina
- Alveolina
- Alveolinella
- Alveolophragmium
- Alveosepta
- Alveovalvulina
- Alzonella
- Ambitropus
- Amijiella
- Ammoastuta
- Ammobacularia
- Ammobaculites
- Ammobaculoides
- Ammocycloculina
- Ammodiscella
- Ammodiscoides
- Ammodiscus
- Ammoelphidiella
- Ammoglobigerina
- Ammogloborotalia
- Ammolagena
- Ammomarginulina
- Ammonia
- Ammopalmula
- Ammoscalaria
- Ammosiphonia
- Ammosphaeroidina
- Ammospirata
- Ammotium
- Ammotrochoides
- Ammovertella
- Ammovertellina
- Ammovolummina
- Amphicervicis
- Amphicoryna
- Amphimorphina
- Amphisorus
- Amphistegina
- Amphitremoida
- Amphoratheca
- Amplectoproductina
- Anaticinella
- Anchispirocyclina
- Andamookia
- Andersenia
- Andersenolina
- Andrejella
- Androsina
- Angotia
- Angulodiscus
- Angulogavelinella
- Angulogerina
- Anictosphaera
- Annectina
- Annulocibicides
- Annulofrondicularia
- Annulopatellina
- Anomalinella
- Anomalinoides
- Antalyna
- Antarcticella
- Apertauroria
- Apterrinella
- Aragonella
- Aragonia
- Arakaevella
- Archaealveolina
- Archaecyclus
- Archaediscus
- Archaeglobigerina
- Archaeochintinia
- Archaeochitosa
- Archaeosepta
- Archaesphaera
- Archaias
- Archiacina
- Arenagula
- Areniconulus
- Arenobulimina
- Arenodosaria
- Arenogaudryina
- Arenonionella
- Arenoparrella
- Arenosiphon
- Arenoturrispirillina
- Arenovidalina
- Armenina
- Arnaudiella
- Articularia
- Articulina
- Asanoina
- Asanonella
- Asanospira
- Aschemocella
- Ascoliella
- Asselodiscus
- Assilina
- Astacolus
- Asterigerina
- Asterigerinata
- Asterigerinella
- Asterigerinoides
- Asteroammonia
- Asteroarchaediscus
- Asterocyclina
- Asterohedbergella
- Asterolepidina
- Asterophragmina
- Asterorbis
- Asterorotalia
- Astrononion
- Astrorhiza
- Astrorotalia
- Asymmetrina
- Atactolituola
- Ataxoorbignyna
- Ataxophragmium
- Atelikamara
- Atwillina
- Aubignyna
- Audienusina
- Auloconus
- Aulotortus
- Auroria
- Austrocolomiá
- Austrotrillina
- Avesnella
- Awhea
- Axiopolina
- Ayalaina

== B ==
- Babelispirillina
- Baculogypsina
- Baculogypsinoides
- Baelenia
- Baggatella
- Baggina
- Bagginoides
- Baisalina
- Baituganella
- Balkhania
- Bandyella
- Banffella
- Bannerella
- Barbourinella
- Barkerina
- Barnardina
- Bartramella
- Bathysiphon
- Bdelloidina
- Beedeina
- Beella
- Belorussiella
- Berggrenia
- Bermudezella
- Bermudezina
- Bermudezinella
- Berthelina
- Berthelinella
- Berthelinopsis
- Biapertorbis
- Biarritzina
- Biasterigerina
- Bibradya
- Biconcava
- Bifarilaminella
- Bifarina
- Bifarinella
- Bifurcammina
- Bigenerina
- Biglobigerinella
- Bilingulogavelinella
- Biloculinella
- Bimonilina
- Biokovina
- Biorbis
- Biparietata
- Biplanata
- Biplanispira
- Bireophax
- Biseriammina
- Biseriella
- Bisphaera
- Bispiranella
- Bitaxia
- Biticinella
- Bituberitina
- Bitubulogenerina
- Biwaella
- Blastammina
- Blefuscuiana
- Blowiella
- Bogushella
- Bojarkaella
- Boldia
- Bolivina
- Bolivinella
- Bolivinellina
- Bolivinita
- Bolivinoides
- Bolivinopsis
- Bolkarina
- Bolliella
- Boltovskoyella
- Borelis
- Boreloides
- Borodinia
- Bosniella
- Boultonia
- Bozorginiella
- Brachysiphon
- Bradyina
- Bramkampella
- Brasiliella
- Brebina
- Brenckleina
- Brevaxina
- Brizalina
- Broeckina
- Broeckinella
- Bronnimannia
- Brunsia
- Brunsiella
- Bucella
- Buccicrenata
- Bucherina
- Buchnerina
- Budashevaella
- Bueningia
- Bulbobaculites
- Bulbobuccicrenata
- Bulbophragmium
- Bulimina
- Buliminella
- Buliminellita
- Buliminoides
- Bullalveolina
- Bullopora
- Burseolina
- Buzasina
- Bykovaeina
- Bykoviella

== C ==
- Calcarina
- Calcitornella
- Calcivertella
- Caligella
- Calveziconus
- Calvezina
- Camagueyia
- Campanellula
- Cancellina
- Cancris
- Cancrisiella
- Candeina
- Candorbulina
- Carbonella
- Caribeanella
- Carinoconus
- Carixia
- Carpentaria
- Carterina
- Caspiella
- Cassidelina
- Cassidella
- Cassidulina
- Cassidulinella
- Cassidulinita
- Cassidulinoides
- Cassigerinella
- Cassigerinelloita
- Cataspydrax
- Caucasina
- Caudriella
- Cellonina
- Ceratammina
- Ceratobulimina
- Ceratocancris
- Ceratolamarckina
- Cerobertina
- Cerobertinella
- Chablaisia
- Chalaroschwagerina
- Chalilovella
- Chapmanina
- Charentia
- Charltonina
- Chenella
- Chenia
- Chernobaculites
- Chernyshinella
- Chernyshinellina
- Chiloguembelina
- Chiloguembelitria
- Chilostomella
- Chilostomelloides
- Chilostomina
- Chitinodendron
- Chitinolagena
- Chitralina
- Choffatella
- Chomatomediocris
- Chrysalidina
- Chrysalidinella
- Chrysalogonium
- Chrysothurammina
- Chubbina
- Chusenella
- Cibicides
- Cibicidina
- Cibicidoides
- Cibicorbis
- Cincoriola
- Ciperozea
- Circinatiella
- Cisalveolina
- Citharina
- Citharinella
- Civrieuxia
- Claudostriatella
- Clavatorella
- Clavelloides
- Clavigerinella
- Clavihedbergella
- Claviticinella
- Clavulina
- Clavulinoides
- Clavulinopsis
- Climacammina
- Clinapertina
- Clypeorbis
- Cocoarota
- Codonofusiella
- Colania
- Colaniella
- Coleiconus
- Coleites
- Colomia
- Colomita
- Colonammina
- Comaliamma
- Compressigerina
- Concavatotruncana
- Concavella
- Condonofusiella
- Condrustella
- Conicorbitolina
- Conicospirillina
- Conilites
- Conoglobigerina
- Conolagena
- Conorbina
- Conorbinella
- Conorbitoides
- Conorboides
- Conorotalites
- Conotrochammina
- Contusotruncana
- Coprolithina
- Cordatella
- Cornuloculina
- Cornuspira
- Coronipora
- Corrigotubella
- Corrosina
- Corrugatella
- Coryphostoma
- Coscinophragma
- Coscinospira
- Coskinolina
- Coskinolinoides
- Coskinon
- Costayella
- Costellagerina
- Costifera
- Coxites
- Crenatella
- Crenaverneuilina
- Crenulostomina
- Crespinella
- Crespinina
- Cribellopsis
- Cribranopsis
- Cribratina
- Cribroaperturata
- Cribroelphidium
- Cribrogenerina
- Cribrogloborotalia
- Cribrogoesella
- Cribrohantkenina
- Cribrohemisphaeroides
- Cribrolenticulina
- Cribrolinoides
- Cribronodosaria
- Cribrononion
- Cribroparrella
- Cribropleurostomella
- Cribropullenia
- Cribrorobulina
- Cribrorotalia
- Cribrosphaeroides
- Cribrospira
- Cribrostomoides
- Cribroturretoides
- Cristellariopsis
- Croneisella
- Cruciloculina
- Cryptoseptida
- Ctenorbitoides
- Cubanina
- Cuburbita
- Cuneolina
- Cuneolinella
- Cuneus
- Cuniculinella
- Cursina
- Cushmania
- Cushmanina
- Cuvillierina
- Cyclammina
- Cycledomia
- Cyclindroclavulina
- Cycloclypeus
- Cycloforina
- Cyclolina
- Cycloloculina
- Cyclopseudedomia
- Cyclopsinella
- Cycloputeolina
- Cyclorbiculina
- Cyclorbiculinoides
- Cyclorbitopsella
- Cylindroclavulina
- Cylindrocolaniella
- Cylindrotrocholina
- Cymbalopora
- Cymbaloporella
- Cymbaloporetta
- Cystammina

== D ==
- Dagmarella
- Dagmarita
- Dainella
- Dainita
- Dainitella
- Daixina
- Danubiella
- Dariellina
- Dariopsidae
- Darjella
- Darvasites
- Daucina
- Daucinoides
- Daviesiconus
- Daviesina
- Daxia
- Debarina
- Deckerella
- Deckerellina
- Demirina
- Dendritina
- Dendrophyra
- Dentalina
- Dentalinella
- Dentalinoides
- Dentalinopsis
- Dentoglobigerina
- Derventina
- Deuterospira
- Dhrumella
- Dictyoconella
- Dictyoconoides
- Dictyoconus
- Dictyokathina
- Dictyopsella
- Dictyopselloides
- Dictyorbitolina
- Dicyclina
- Dimorphina
- Diplosphaerina
- Diplotremina
- Discamminoides
- Discanomalina
- Discocyclina
- Discogypsina
- Discoramulina
- Discorbinella
- Discorbis
- Discorbitina
- Discorbitura
- Discorinopsis
- Discorotalia
- Discospirina
- Dizerina
- Dobrogelina
- Dogielina
- Dohaia
- Dolosella
- Dorothia
- Drepaniota
- Drevennia
- Droogerinella
- Dryorhizopsis
- Dukhania
- Dunbarinella
- Dunbarula
- Duostomina
- Duotaxis
- Duplella
- Dutkevichella
- Dutkevichites
- Dutkevitchia
- Dyfrondicularia
- Dymia
- Dyocibicides

== E ==
- Earlandia
- Earlandinella
- Earlandinita
- Eblanaia
- Echigoina
- Echinoporina
- Eclusia
- Econgella
- Edhemia
- Edithaella
- Edomia
- Eggerella
- Eggerellina
- Eggerina
- Ehrenbergina
- Elenella
- Elergella
- Elhasaella
- Ellipsobulimina
- Ellipsocristellaria
- Ellipsodimorphina
- Ellipsoglandulina
- Ellipsoidella
- Ellipsoidina
- Ellipsolingulina
- Ellipsopolymorphina
- Elongobula
- Elphidiella
- Elphidioides
- Elphidium
- Enantiomorphina
- Enatiodentalina
- Endochernella
- Endospiroplectammina
- Endostaffella
- Endoteba
- Endotebanella
- Endothyra
- Endothyranella
- Endothyranopsis
- Endotriada
- Endotriadella
- Eoammosphaeroides
- Eoannularia
- Eoclavatorella
- Eoconuloides
- Eocristellaria
- Eoendothyra
- Eoendothyranopsis
- Eoeponidella
- Eofabiania
- Eoforschia
- Eofusulina
- Eoglobigerina
- Eoguttulina
- Eohastigerinella
- Eolagena
- Eolasiodiscus
- Eomarssonella
- Eonodosaria
- Eoophthalmidium
- Eopalorbitolina
- Eoparafusulina
- Eopolydiexodina
- Eoquasiendothyra
- Eorupertia
- Eoschubertella
- Eosigmoilina
- Eostaffella
- Eostaffeloides
- Eotextularia
- Eotournayella
- Eotuberitina
- Eouvigerina
- Eoverbeekina
- Eovolutina
- Eowaeringella
- Eowedekindellina
- Eozellia
- Epiannularia
- Epistomaria
- Epistomina
- Epistominella
- Epistominita
- Epistominitella
- Epistominoides
- Epithemella
- Eponidella
- Eponides
- Escornebovina
- Eubuliminella
- Eulepidina
- Eulinderina
- Euloxostomum
- Eurycheilostoma
- Euuvigerina
- Euxinita
- Everticyclammina
- Evlania
- Evolutinella
- Evolutononion
- Evolvocassidulina
- Exsculptina
- Eygalierina

== F ==
- Fabiania
- Fabularia
- Fallotella
- Fallotia
- Falsocibicides
- Falsogaudryinella
- Falsoguttulina
- Falsopalmula
- Falsoplanulina
- Falsotruncana
- Falsurgonina
- Faujasina
- Favocassidulina
- Favulina
- Favusella
- Felsinella
- Ferayina
- Feurtillia
- Fijnonion
- Finlayina
- Fischerina
- Fissoelphidium
- Fissurina
- Flabellammina
- Flabellamminopsis
- Flabellinella
- Flabellocyclolina
- Flagrospira
- Flectospira
- Flintinella
- Flosculinella
- Flourensina
- Fontbotia
- Forschia
- Forschiella
- Francesita
- Freixialina
- Frondicularia
- Frondiculinata
- Frondilina
- Frondina
- Frondovaginulina
- Frumentella
- Fursenkoina
- Fusarchaias
- Fusiella
- Fusulina
- Fusulinella

== G ==
- Gabonita
- Galeanella
- Galliherina
- Gallitellia
- Gallowaiina
- Galwayella
- Gandinella
- Ganella
- Gansserina
- Garantella
- Gastroammina
- Gaudryina
- Gaudryinella
- Gaudryinoides
- Gaudryinopsis
- Gavelinella
- Gavelinopsis
- Geinitzina
- Gemellides
- Geminospira
- Gendrotella
- Gerkeina
- Gheorghianina
- Gigasbia
- Giraliarella
- Glabratella
- Glabratellina
- Glandulina
- Glandulinoides
- Glandulopleurostomella
- Globanomalina
- Globicuniculus
- Globigerapsis
- Globigerina
- Globigerinatella
- Globigerinatheka
- Globigerinella
- Globigerinelloides
- Globigerinita
- Globigerinoides
- Globigerinoidesella
- Globigerinoita
- Globigerinopsis
- Globigerinopsoides
- Globimorphina
- Globispiroplectamminha
- Globivalvulina
- Globobulimina
- Globocassidulina
- Globochernella
- Globoconusa
- Globoendothyra
- Globofissurella
- Globoquadrina
- Globoreticulina
- Globorosalina
- Globorotalia
- Globorotalites
- Globorotaloides
- Globospirillina
- Globotetrataxis
- Globotruncana
- Globotruncanella
- Globotruncanita
- Globoturborotalita
- Globuligerina
- Globulina
- Globulospinella
- Glomalveolina
- Glomodiscus
- Glomospira
- Glomospiranella
- Glomospirella
- Glomospiroides
- Glomotrocholina
- Glubokoevella
- Glyphostomella
- Goesella
- Gonatosphaera
- Gorbachikella
- Gorisella
- Goupillaudina
- Granuliferella
- Granuliferelloides
- Gravellina
- Grigelis
- Grillina
- Grillita
- Grimsdaleinella
- Gsollbergella
- Gubkinella
- Gublerina
- Guembelitria
- Guembelitriella
- Guembelitrioides
- Gunteria
- Guppyella
- Gutnicella
- Guttulina
- Gypsina
- Gyroconulina
- Gyroidina
- Gyroidinella
- Gyroidinoides
- Gyrovalvulina

== H ==
- Haddonia
- Haerella
- Haeuslerella
- Hagenowella
- Hagenowina
- Haimasiella
- Halenia
- Halkyardia
- Hanostaffella
- Hansenisca
- Hantkenina
- Hanzawaia
- Haoella
- Haplophragmella
- Haplophragmina
- Haplophragmium
- Haplophragmoides
- Hastigerina
- Hastigerinella
- Hastigerinoides
- Hastigerinopsis
- Hauerina
- Haurania
- Hayasakaina
- Haynesina
- Hechtina
- Hedbergella
- Hedraites
- Helentappanella
- Helicolepidina
- Helicorbitoides
- Helicostegina
- Helicosteginopsis
- Hellenocyclina
- Helvetoglobatruncana
- Hemicyclammina
- Hemidiscus
- Hemifusulina
- Hemifusulinella
- Hemirobulina
- Hemisphaerammina
- Hemithurammina
- Hemlebenia
- Hensonia
- Hensonina
- Hergottella
- Heronallenia
- Heterantyx
- Heterillina
- Heterocoskinolina
- Heterohelix
- Heterolepa
- Heteromorphina
- Heterostegina
- Heterostomella
- Hidaella
- Hidina
- Hiltermannella
- Hippocrepina
- Hippocrepinella
- Hirsutospirella
- Histopomphus
- Historbitoides
- Hoeglundina
- Hofkerina
- Hofkeruva
- Holkeria
- Hollandina
- Holmanella
- Homalohedra
- Homotrema
- Hopkinsina
- Hopkinsinella
- Hormosina
- Hormosinella
- Hospitella
- Hottingerella
- Hottingerina
- Hottingerita
- Howchinella
- Howchinia
- Hoyenella
- Hubeiella
- Hyalinea
- Hyalinonetrion
- Hyderia
- Hydrania
- Hyperammina
- Hyperamminita
- Hyperamminoides
- Hyperbathoides

== I ==
- Ichthyolaria
- Idalina
- Igorina
- Ilerdorbis
- Illigata
- Inaequalina
- Inauris
- Inflatobolivinella
- Inordinatosphaera
- Insculptarenula
- Insolentitheca
- Involutaria
- Involutina
- Involvina
- Iowanella
- Iraqia
- Irenita
- Irregularina
- Islandiella
- Ismailia
- Istriloculina
- Iuliusina
- Ivanovella
- Ivdelina

== J ==
- Jaculella
- Jadammina
- Janischewskina
- Jarvisella
- Jascottella
- Jurella

== K ==
- Kaeveria
- Kahlerina
- Kalamopsis
- Kalosha
- Kamurana
- Kanakaia
- Kangvarella
- Kansanella
- Karaburunia
- Karaisella
- Karreria
- Karreriella
- Karrerotextularia
- Kasachstanodiscus
- Kassabiana
- Kathina
- Kechenotiske
- Keramosphaerina
- Kerionammina
- Kettnerammina
- Kilianina
- Klamathina
- Klubonibelia
- Klubovella
- Kolchidina
- Kolesnikovella
- Korobkovella
- Koskinobigenerina
- Koskinotextularia
- Krikoumbilica
- Kuglerina
- Kunklerina
- Kurnubia
- Kutsevella
- Kwantoella
- Kyphopyxa

== L ==
- Labiostoma
- Labyrinthidoma
- Labyrinthina
- Labyrinthochitinia
- Lacazina
- Lacazinella
- Lacosteina
- Laculatina
- Ladoronia
- Laevidentalina
- Laevipeneroplis
- Laffitteina
- Lagena
- Lagenammina
- Lagenoglandulina
- Lagnea
- Lamarckella
- Lamarckina
- Lamarmorella
- Lamelliconus
- Laminononion
- Langenosolenia
- Lankesterina
- Lantschichites
- Larrazetia
- Lasiodiscus
- Lasiotrochus
- Laterostomella
- Latibolivina
- Laticarinina
- Latiendothyra
- Latiendothyranopsis
- Laxoendothyra
- Laxoseptabrunsiina
- Leella
- Lenticulina
- Lenticulinella
- Lepidocyclina
- Lepidorbitoides
- Lepidosemicyclina
- Leptotriticites
- Lernella
- Leupoldina
- Liebusella
- Lilliputianella
- Linaresia
- Linderina
- Lingulina
- Lingulogavelinella
- Lingulonodosaria
- Lipinella
- Lipinellina
- Lippsina
- Lituola
- Lituolipora
- Lituonelloides
- Lituotuba
- Lituotubella
- Lobatula
- Lockhartia
- Loeblichia
- Loftusia
- Loisthostomata
- Longiapertina
- Louisettita
- Loxostomina
- Loxostomoides
- Loxostomum
- Lugtonia
- Lunatriella
- Lunucammina
- Lysella

== M ==
- Magnesoina
- Maichelina
- Makarskiana
- Maklaya
- Mandjina
- Mandorovella
- Manorella
- Marginara
- Marginopora
- Marginotruncana
- Marginulina
- Marginulinita
- Marginulinopsis
- Marieita
- Marsipella
- Marssonella
- Martiguesia
- Martinottiella
- Maslinella
- Massilina
- Matanzia
- Maylisoria
- Mayncina
- Mccloudia
- Meandroloculina
- Meandropsina
- Meandrospira
- Meandrospiranella
- Mediocris
- Mediopsis
- Medipsia
- Medocia
- Megastomella
- Meidamonella
- Melathrokerion
- Melatolla
- Melonis
- Merlingina
- Mesammina
- Mesodentalina
- Mesoendothyra
- Mesorbitolina
- Mesoschubertella
- Metadoliolina
- Metapolymorphina
- Meyendorffina
- Migros
- Mikhailovella
- Miliammina
- Miliola
- Miliolechina
- Miliolinella
- Miliolipora
- Miliospirella
- Millerella
- Miniacina
- Miniuva
- Minojapanella
- Minouxia
- Minyaichme
- Miogypsina
- Miogypsinita
- Miogypsinoides
- Miolepidocyclina
- Miosorites
- Mirifica
- Mironovella
- Miscellanea
- Misellina
- Mississippina
- Moesiloculina
- Moncharmontia
- Monodiexodina
- Monotaxinoides
- Monspeliensina
- Montfortella
- Montiparus
- Montsechiana
- Mooreinella
- Moravammina
- Morozovella
- Mstinia
- Mstiniella
- Mucronina
- Mufushanella
- Multifidella
- Multiseptida
- Multispirina
- Murciella
- Murgeina
- Murgella
- Muricoglobigerina
- Murrayinella
- Mychostomina

== N ==
- Nagatoella
- Nanicella
- Nankinella
- Nanlingella
- Narayania
- Naupliella
- Nautiloculina
- Navarella
- Neaguites
- Neoacarinina
- Neoarchaediscus
- Neoarchaesphaera
- Neobrunsiina
- Neobulimina
- Neocarpenteria
- Neoclavulina
- Neocribrella
- Neodiscocyclina
- Neoeponides
- Neoflabellina
- Neofusulina
- Neofusulinella
- Neogloboquadrina
- Neogyroidina
- Neoiraqia
- Neolenticulina
- Neomisellina
- Neoparadainella
- Neoplanorbulinella
- Neorbitolinopsis
- Neorotalia
- Neoschubertella
- Neoschwagerina
- Neostaffella
- Neothailandina
- Neouvigenna
- Nephrolepidina
- Nephrosphaera
- Nevillella
- Nezzazata
- Nezzazatinella
- Nikitinella
- Ninella
- Nipponitella
- Nodasperodiscus
- Nodellum
- Nodobacularia
- Nodobaculariella
- Nodobolivinella
- Nodochernyshinella
- Nodogenerina
- Nodogordiospira
- Nodoinvolutaria
- Nodomorphina
- Nodophthalmidium
- Nodosarchaediscus
- Nodosarella
- Nodosaria
- Nodosinella
- Nodosinelloides
- Nonion
- Nonionella
- Nonionelleta
- Nonionellina
- Norcottia
- Nothia
- Notoconorbina
- Notoplanulina
- Notorotalia
- Nouria
- Novalesia
- Novella
- Nubecularia
- Nudarchaediscus
- Nummodiscorbis
- Nummofallotia
- Nummoloculina
- Nummulite
- Nuttallides
- Nuttallinella
- Nuttallus

== O ==
- Oberhauserella
- Obliquina
- Obsoletes
- Occidentoschwagerina
- Oketaella
- Olssonina
- Omphalocyclus
- Omphalotis
- Oolina
- Oolitella
- Operculina
- Opertorbitolites
- Opertum
- Ophthalmidium
- Ophthalmipora
- Orbignyna
- Orbitammina
- Orbitoclypeus
- Orbitocyclina
- Orbitoides
- Orbitokathina
- Orbitolina
- Orbitolinella
- Orbitolinopsis
- Orbitolites
- Orbitopsella
- Orbulina
- Orbulinoides
- Orcadia
- Ordovicina
- Oridorsalis
- Orientina
- Orietalia
- Orithostella
- Ornatanomalina
- Orthella
- Orthokarstenia
- Orthomorphina
- Orthotrinacria
- Orthovertella
- Oryctoderma
- Osangularia
- Ovalveolina
- Oxinoxis
- Ozawainella
- Ozourina

== P ==
- Paalzowella
- Pachyphloia
- Pachythurammina
- Pacinonion
- Palachemonella
- Palaeobigenerina
- Palaeofusulina
- Palaeolituonella
- Palaeomiliolina
- Palaeoreichelina
- Palaeospiroplectammina
- Palaeostaffella
- Palaeotextularia
- Paleodictyoconus
- Paleogaudryina
- Paleopatellina
- Paleopolymorphina
- Pallaimorphina
- Palliolatella
- Palmerinella
- Palmula
- Palorbitolina
- Palorbitolinoides
- Pamirina
- Pandaglandulina
- Pannellaina
- Paracaligella
- Paracassidulina
- Paracoskinolina
- Paracyclammina
- Paradagmarita
- Paradainella
- Paradoxiella
- Paradunbarula
- Paraendothyra
- Paraeofusulina
- Parafissurina
- Parafrondicularia
- Parafusulina
- Parafusulinella
- Paragaudryina
- Paraglobivalvulina
- Paraglobivalvulinoides
- Paragloborotalia
- Paralabamina
- Paralingulina
- Parananlingella
- Paraophthalmidium
- Paraplectogyra
- Parareichelina
- Pararotalia
- Paraschwagerina
- Parasorites
- Parasubbotina
- Parastegnammina
- Paratextularia
- Parathurammina
- Parathuramminites
- Paratikhinella
- Paratriasina
- Paratrochamminoides
- Paravulvulina
- Parawelekindellina
- Parinvolutina
- Parphia
- Parrellina
- Parrelloides
- Partisania
- Parurgonina
- Parvularugoglobigerina
- Pastrikella
- Patellina
- Patellinella
- Patellovalvulina
- Paulbronnimannella
- Paulina
- Pavlovecina
- Pavonina
- Pavoninoides
- Pavonitina
- Pavopsammia
- Pealerina
- Pegidia
- Pellatispira
- Pellatispirella
- Pelosina
- Peneroplis
- Penoperculoides
- Percultazonaria
- Periloculina
- Permodiscus
- Pernerina
- Perouvianella
- Petchorina
- Pfenderella
- Pfendericonus
- Pfenderina
- Phenacophragma
- Piallina
- Picounina
- Pijpersia
- Pilammina
- Pilamminella
- Pinaria
- Pisolina
- Pityusina
- Placentammina
- Placopsilina
- Plagioraphe
- Plagiostomella
- Planiinvoluta
- Planispirillina
- Planispirina
- Planispirinella
- Planoarchaediscus
- Planoendothyra
- Planoglabratella
- Planoglobulina
- Planogypsina
- Planolinderina
- Planomalina
- Planomiliola
- Planopulivinulina
- Planorbulina
- Planorbulinella
- Planorotalites
- Planospirodiscus
- Planularia
- Planulina
- Planulinoides
- Platysolenites
- Plecanium
- Plectina
- Plectinella
- Plectofrondicularia
- Plectofusulina
- Plectogyranopsis
- Plectomediocris
- Plectomillerella
- Plectorecurvoides
- Plectotrochammina
- Pleuroskelidion
- Pleurostomella
- Pleurostomelloides
- Plummerinella
- Plummerita
- Podolia
- Pohlia
- Pojarkovella
- Polychasmina
- Polydiexodina
- Polylepidina
- Polymorphina
- Polymorphinella
- Polyperibola
- Polystomellina
- Polytaxis
- Popovia
- Poroarticulina
- Poroeponides
- Porosorotalia
- Porticulasphaera
- Postendothyra
- Postrugoglobigerina
- Praealveolina
- Praeammoastuta
- Praebulimina
- Praebullalveolina
- Praechrysalidina
- Praecystammina
- Praedictyorbitolina
- Praeglobobulimina
- Praeglobotruncana
- Praehedbergella
- Praekaraisella
- Praekurnubia
- Praelacazina
- Praemurica
- Praeophthalmidium
- Praeorbitolina
- Praeorbulina
- Praeparafusulina
- Praepeneroplis
- Praepseudofusulina
- Praereticulinella
- Praerhapydionina
- Praesiderolites
- Praestorrsella
- Pragsoconulus
- Pravitoschwagerina
- Pravoslavlevia
- Presumatrina
- Primoriina
- Priscella
- Prismatomorpha
- Pristinosceptrella
- Procerolagena
- Prodentalina
- Profusulinella
- Proninella
- Prosphaeroidinella
- Protelphidium
- Protentella
- Protoglobobulimina
- Protonodosaria
- Protopeneroplis
- Protriticites
- Proxifrons
- Psammatodendron
- Psamminopelta
- Psammolingulina
- Psammophax
- Psammosphaera
- Pseudastrorhiza
- Pseudedomia
- Pseudoammodiscus
- Pseudobaisalina
- Pseudobolivina
- Pseudobradyina
- Pseudobroeckinella
- Pseudobulimina
- Pseudobulminella
- Pseudocassidulinoides
- Pseudochernyshinella
- Pseudochoffatella
- Pseudochrysalidina
- Pseudocibicides
- Pseudoclavulina
- Pseudocylammina
- Pseudodoliolina
- Pseudoendothyra
- Pseudoepistominella
- Pseudoeponides
- Pseudofabularia
- Pseudofissurina
- Pseudofrondicularia
- Pseudofusulina
- Pseudofusulinella
- Pseudogaudryina
- Pseudogaudryinella
- Pseudogavelinella
- Pseudogloborotalia
- Pseudoglomospira
- Pseudoguembelina
- Pseudohastigerina
- Pseudohaureina
- Pseudohelenina
- Pseudohyperammina
- Pseudokahlerina
- Pseudolacazina
- Pseudolamarckina
- Pseudolepidina
- Pseudolituonella
- Pseudolituotuba
- Pseudolituotubella
- Pseudomarssonella
- Pseudomphalocyclus
- Pseudonodosaria
- Pseudononion
- Pseudonovella
- Pseudoolina
- Pseudopalmula
- Pseudoparrella
- Pseudopatellinella
- Pseudopatellinoides
- Pseudopfenderina
- Pseudophragmina
- Pseudoplanoendothyra
- Pseudoplanoglobulina
- Pseudoplanulinella
- Pseudopolymorphina
- Pseudopolymorphinoides
- Pseudorbitoides
- Pseudorbitolina
- Pseudoreichelina
- Pseudoreophax
- Pseudorhapydionina
- Pseudorhipidionina
- Pseudorotalia
- Pseudoruttenia
- Pseudosaracenaria
- Pseudoschwagerina
- Pseudosiderolites
- Pseudosigmoilina
- Pseudosiphonella
- Pseudosolenina
- Pseudospirocyclina
- Pseudostaffella
- Pseudotaxis
- Pseudotextularia
- Pseudotextulariella
- Pseudotribrachia
- Pseudotriloculina
- Pseudotriplasia
- Pseudotristix
- Pseudotriticites
- Pseudouvigerina
- Pseudovidalina
- Pseudowanganella
- Pseudowedekindellina
- Pseudowoodella
- Psilocitharella
- Pterammina
- Ptychocladia
- Pullenia
- Pulleniatina
- Pullenoides
- Pulsiphonina
- Punctobolivinella
- Putrella
- Pygmaeoseistron
- Pyramidina
- Pyramidulina
- Pyrenina
- Pyrgo
- Pyrgoella
- Pyrulina
- Pyrulinoides
- Pytine

== Q ==
- Qataria
- Quadratobuliminella
- Quadrimorphina
- Quadrimorphinella
- Quasibolivinella
- Quasiborelis
- Quasicyclammina
- Quasiendothyra
- Quasifusulina
- Quasifusulinoides
- Quasiiregularina
- Quasilituotuba
- Quasirotalia
- Quasispiroplectammina
- Quasiverbeekina
- Queraltina
- Quinqueloculina
- Quydatella

== R ==
- Raadshoovenia
- Rabanitina
- Racemiguembelina
- Radiocyclopeus
- Radotruncana
- Raibosammina
- Ramovsia
- Ramulina
- Ramulinella
- Ranikothalia
- Raphconilia
- Rauserella
- Rauserina
- Rectoavesmella
- Rectobolivina
- Rectobulimina
- Rectochernyshinella
- Rectocibicides
- Rectocornuspira
- Rectocyclammia
- Rectodictyoconus
- Rectoelphidiella
- Rectoendothyra
- Rectoepistominoides
- Rectoeponides
- Rectoglomospira
- Rectomillerella
- Rectoseptaglomospirane
- Rectoseptatournayella
- Rectostipulina
- Rectotournayellina
- Rectuvigerina
- Recurvoides
- Recurvoidella
- Redmondina
- Reedella
- Reichelina
- Reichelinella
- Reinholdella
- Reissella
- Reitlingerina
- Remesella
- Renulina
- Reophacella
- Reophax
- Repmanina
- Resigia
- Reticulinella
- Reticulogyra
- Reticulopalmula
- Reticulophragmium
- Reticulophragmoides
- Reusella
- Reussoolina
- Rhabdammina
- Rhabdorbitoides
- Rhapydionina
- Rhenothyra
- Rhizammina
- Rhodanopeza
- Rhodesinella
- Rhombobolivinella
- Rimalina
- Ripacubana
- Riveroinella
- Riyadhella
- Robertina
- Robertinoides
- Robuloides
- Robulus
- Robustopachyphloia
- Robustoschwagerina
- Roglicia
- Rolfina
- Rosalina
- Rotalia
- Rotaliatina
- Rotaliatinopsis
- Rotalidium
- Rotalinoides
- Rotalipora
- Rotamorphina
- Rothina
- Ruakituria
- Ruatoria
- Rugobolivinella
- Rugoglobigerina
- Rugosochusenella
- Rugososchwagerina
- Rugotruncana
- Rupertina
- Russiella
- Rutherfordoides
- Ryadhella
- Rzehakina

== S ==
- Sabaudia
- Sabellovoluta
- Sabulina
- Saccammina
- Saccamminoides
- Saccamminopsis
- Saccarena
- Sacchararena
- Saccorhina
- Saccorhiza
- Sagenina
- Sagoplecta
- Sagrina
- Sagrinopsis
- Saidovina
- Sakesaria
- Sakhiella
- Salpingthurammina
- Saltovskajina
- Sanderella
- Sansabaina
- Saracenaria
- Saracenella
- Saraswati
- Satorina
- Saudia
- Scandonea
- Scarificatina
- Schackoina
- Schackoinella
- Scheibnerova
- Scherochorella
- Schlosserina
- Schlumbergerella
- Schmidita
- Schubertella
- Schwagerina
- Sculptobaculites
- Scyphocodon
- Scythiloculina
- Seabrookia
- Semiendothyra
- Semiinvoluta
- Seminovella
- Semirosalina
- Semitextularia
- Semivalvulina
- Senalveolina
- Septabrunsiina
- Septaforschia
- Septagathammina
- Septatournayella
- Septigerina
- Serovaina
- Serpenulina
- Serpulopsis
- Sestronophora
- Shanita
- Shastrina
- Shengella
- Sherbornina
- Shouguania
- Shuguria
- Sichotenella
- Siculocosta
- Siderolites
- Sieberina
- Sigalia
- Sigalitruncana
- Sigmavirgulina
- Sigmella
- Sigmoidella
- Sigmoihauerina
- Sigmoilina
- Sigmoilinita
- Sigmoilopsis
- Sigmomorphina
- Silicomassilina
- Silicosigmoilina
- Silicotuba
- Silvestriella
- Simionescella
- Simobaculites
- Simplalveolina
- Simplorbites
- Simplorbitolina
- Sinzowella
- Siphogaudryina
- Siphogenerina
- Siphogenerinoides
- Siphoglobulina
- Sipholagena
- Siphonaperta
- Siphonides
- Siphonina
- Siphoninella
- Siphoninoides
- Siphonodosaria
- Siphonofera
- Siphonoscutula
- Siphotextularia
- Siphouvigerina
- Sirtina
- Sitella
- Sivasella
- Skinnerina
- Smoutina
- Sogdianina
- Somalina
- Soriella
- Sorites
- Sornayina
- Sorosphaera
- Sorosphaerella
- Sorostomasphaera
- Spandelinoides
- Sphaerogypsina
- Sphaeroidina
- Sphaeroidinella
- Sphaeroidinellopsis
- Sphaeroschwagerina
- Sphaerulina
- Spinobrunsiina
- Spinochernella
- Spinodiscorbis
- Spinoendothyra
- Spinolaxina
- Spinothyra
- Spinotournayella
- Spiraloconulus
- Spirapertolina
- Spiriamphorella
- Spirillina
- Spirobolivina
- Spiroclypeus
- Spirocyclina
- Spirofrondicularia
- Spirolina
- Spirolingulina
- Spiroloculina
- Spiroloxostoma
- Spiroplecta
- Spiroplectammina
- Spiroplectina
- Spiroplectinata
- Spiroplectinella
- Spiropsammia
- Spirosigmoilina
- Spirosigmoilinella
- Spirosolenites
- Spirotecta
- Spirotrocholina
- Sporadotrema
- Sporobulimina
- Sporobuliminella
- Staffella
- Stainforthia
- Stedumia
- Stegnammina
- Steinetella
- Stellarticulina
- Stenocyclina
- Stensioina
- Stetsonia
- Stichocassidulina
- Stichocibicides
- Stilostomella
- Stomasphaera
- Stomatorbina
- Stomatostoecha
- Stomoloculina
- Storrsella
- Storthosphaera
- Streptalveolina
- Streptochilus
- Streptocyclammina
- Striataella
- Strictocostella
- Strigialifusus
- Subalveolina
- Subbdelloidina
- Subbotina
- Sublamarckella
- Suggrunda
- Sulcoperculina
- Sulcorbitoides
- Sumatrina
- Svenia
- Svratkina
- Syzranella
- Syzrania

== T ==
- Taberina
- Taitzehoella
- Takayanagia
- Talimuella
- Talpinella
- Tappanella
- Tappanina
- Tasmanammina
- Tayamaia
- Technitella
- Tenisonina
- Tennuitella
- Tentifrons
- Tentilenticulina
- Tergrigorjanzaella
- Testacarinata
- Tetragonulina
- Tetraminouxia
- Tetrataxis
- Tewoella
- Textularia
- Textulariella
- Textulariopsis
- Textulina
- Tezaquina
- Thailandina
- Thalamophaga
- Thalmannammina
- Thalmannita
- Thekammina
- Tholosina
- Thomasinella
- Thompsonella
- Thurammina
- Thuramminoides
- Thuramminopsis
- Ticinella
- Tikhinella
- Timanella
- Timidonella
- Tinophodella
- Tiphotrocha
- Tobolia
- Tollmannia
- Tolypammina
- Topalodiscorbis
- Torinosuella
- Toriyamaia
- Torreina
- Torremiroella
- Torresina
- Tortaguttus
- Tortonella
- Torulumbonina
- Tosaia
- Tournarchaediscus
- Tournayella
- Tournayellina
- Trachelinella
- Transversigerina
- Tremachora
- Trepeilopsis
- Tretomphalus
- Triadodiscus
- Triasina
- Tribrachia
- Tricarinella
- Trichohylas
- Trifarina
- Triloculina
- Triloculinella
- Triloculinoides
- Triloculinopsis
- Trinitella
- Triplasia
- Trispirina
- Tristix
- Tritaxia
- Tritaxilina
- Triticites
- Tritubulogenerina
- Trochammina
- Trochamminoides
- Trochamminula
- Trochospira
- Trochospirillina
- Trochulina
- Trochylina
- Truncorotalia
- Truncorotaloides
- Tschokrakella
- Tubeporella
- Tubeporina
- Tuberendothyra
- Tuberitina
- Tubinella
- Tubispirodiscus
- Tuborecta
- Tubulogenerina
- Turborotalia
- Turborotalita
- Turcmeniella
- Turkmenella
- Turrilina
- Turrispirillina
- Turrispiroides
- Turritellella

== U ==
- Unicosiphonia
- Unitendina
- Uralinella
- Uralodiscus
- Uralofusulinella
- Urbanella
- Urgonina
- Urnulinella
- Usbekistania
- Uslonia
- Uviella
- Uvigerina
- Uvigerinammina
- Uvigerinella

== V ==
- Vacuovalvulina
- Vaginulina
- Vaginulinopsis
- Valdanchella
- Valserina
- Valvalabamina
- Valvoreussella
- Valvulammina
- Valvulina
- Valvulinella
- Valvulineria
- Valvulinoides
- Vandenbroeckia
- Vanderbeekia
- Vania
- Varidentella
- Variostoma
- Vasicekia
- Vasicostella
- Vasiglobulina
- Vaughanina
- Velapertina
- Vellaena
- Ventilabrella
- Ventrostoma
- Verbeekina
- Vercorsella
- Verella
- Verneuilina
- Verneuilinella
- Verneuilinoides
- Vernonina
- Verseyella
- Vialovella
- Vialovia
- Vicinesphaera
- Victoriella
- Vidalina
- Vinelloidea
- Virgulinella
- Virguloides
- Virgulopsis
- Viseidiscus
- Viseina
- Vissariotaxis
- Vitriwebbina
- Voloshinoides
- Voloshinovella
- Vostokovella
- Vulvulina

== W ==
- Wadella
- Waeringella
- Walterparria
- Warnantella
- Washitella
- Webbinella
- Webbinelloidea
- Wedekindellina
- Wellmanella
- Wheelerella
- Whiteinella
- Wiesnerina
- Wilfordia
- Woodella
- Woodringina
- Wutuella

== X ==
- Xenostaffella
- Xintania

== Y ==
- Yabeina
- Yaberinella
- Yangchienia
- Yaucorotalia
- Yneziella

== Z ==
- Zarodella
- Zeaflorilus
- Zeauvigerina
- Zelamarckina
- Zellerina
- Zellia
- Ziguiella
- Zotheculifida

== Sources ==
- World Foraminifera Database
- Journal of Foraminiferal Research, Cushman Foundation
- Loeblich & Tappin, 1964. Treatise on Invertebrate Paleontology, Part C

== See also ==
- Protists in the fossil record
