= Pseudogaudryinidae =

Pseudogaudryinidae Temporal range: Late Cretaceous - Recent

Scientific classification
- Domain: Eukaryota
- Clade: Sar
- Clade: Rhizaria
- Phylum: Retaria
- Subphylum: Foraminifera
- Class: Globothalamea
- Order: Textulariida
- Superfamily: Textularioidea
- Family: Pseudogaudryinidae; Loeblich and Tappan, 1985

Subfamilies
- See text

Family of single-celled organisms

The Pseudogaudryinidae is a family of Late Cretaceous to recent benthic agglutinated Foraminifera included in the Textulariida. Tests are elongate with an early triserial stage, later reduced to biserial or uniserial. Walls are of agglutinated material and are canaliculate, that is have micro-tubular cavities. Apertures, an interiomarginal arch. The Pseudogaudryinidae differs from the Verneuilinidae in the canaliculate wall and from the Valvulinidae in having a simple aperture without a tooth.

Two subfamilies have been defined, the Pseudogaudryininae and Siphoniferoidinae
