= Neoconorbina =

Scientific classification
- Domain: Eukaryota
- Clade: Sar
- Clade: Rhizaria
- Phylum: Retaria
- Subphylum: Foraminifera
- Class: Globothalamea
- Order: Rotaliida
- Family: Rosalinidae
- Genus: Neoconorbina; Hofker, 1951

Genus of single-celled organisms

Neoconorbina is a genus of recent (Holocene) discorboidean foraminifers related to Rosalina with a low conical trochoidal test, circular in outline. The conical side is the spiral side, on which all three whorls are visible, the final chamber taking up most of the periphery. The umbilical side is flat to concave. exposing only the three to four chambers of the final whorl around an open umbilicus. Chambers on the umbilical side have triangular to platelike umbilical extensions as with other rasalinids. The wall of is calcite, finely and densely perforate on the spiral side, more coarsely perforate on the umbilical side; surface smooth; aperture at the umbilical margin of the chamber, beneath the platelike extension, or folium.

Neoconorbina and the Rosalinidae are included in the Kingdom Protoctista according to the Sen Gupta, 2002. Loeblich and Tappan, 1964, in the Treatise included Neoconobina in the Discorbidae, along with such as Discorbis and Rosalina, all regarded as Protista.
