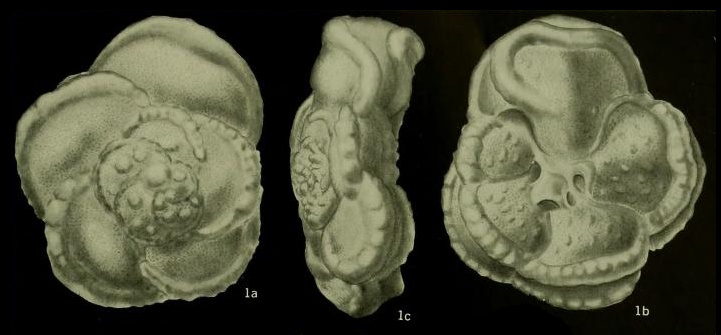
- Illustration of A. mayaroensis, 1957

Scientific classification
- Domain: Eukaryota
- Clade: Sar
- Clade: Rhizaria
- Phylum: Retaria
- Subphylum: Foraminifera
- Class: Globothalamea
- Order: †Globotruncanida
- Family: †Abathomphalidae; Pessagno, 1967
- Genus: †Abathomphalus; Bolli, Loeblich & Tappan, 1957

Type species
- Abathomphalus mayaroensis (Bolli, 1951)

Species
- Abathomphalus mayaroensis; Abathomphalus intermedius

Synonyms
- Abathomphalinae Loeblich & Tappan 1982

= Abathomphalus =

Abathomphalus Temporal range: Maastrichtian

Fossil genus of single-celled organisms

Abathomphalus (from Greek abathes 'shallow' and omphalus 'umbilicus') is a genus of extinct foraminifera present in the Maastrichtian geological range. It is the only genus of the family Abathomphalidae.

== Description ==
Abathomphalus is a genus of fossil foraminifera present in the Maastrichtian (77.2 to 66 million years ago), the geological age preceding the Cretaceous–Paleogene extinction event. Due to its geological range and cosmopolitan distribution, its type species A. mayaroensis often serves as a guide fossil for identifying the Cretaceous-Paleogene boundary in biostratigraphy (known as the Abathomphalus mayaroensis zone).

The test of Abathomphalus forms a low to flat umbilicate trochospiral, with four to five petaloid chambers per whorl. Its sutures are curved and oblique, depressed to thickened and nodose on the spiral side, but depressed and radial on the umbilical side. The umbilicus is small. The periphery is angular to truncate, with two variously spaced keels (i.e., bicarinate); the keel on the umbilical side may be reduced to a row of short transversal costellae. The wall is calcareous, its surface perforated, commonly ornamented with fine pustules and short aligned costellae. The primary aperture is interiomarginal, extraumbilical-umbilical, with a porticus. The portici of successive chambers coalesce in the early stage, become larger in the adult stage and join only at a few points.

This genus differs from Globotruncana in the radial sutures on the umbilical side, the extraumbilical position of its primary aperture, and the closed umbilical area. It differs from Globorotalia and Rotalipora by the presence of the tegillum and accessory infralaminal apertures. It differs further from Rotalipora by lacking secondary sutural apertures on the umbilical side. Globotruncanella is considered the ancestor of Abathomphalus.

== Taxonomy ==
Abathomphalus was first proposed in 1957 by paleontologists Hans Martin Bolli, Alfred R. Loeblich Jr., and Helen Tappan. They described it to accommodate the species previously known as Globotruncana mayaroensis, due to morphological differences from the genus Globotruncana. As such, they renamed the species to Abathomphalus mayaroensis, which became the type species for this new genus.

Abathomphalus is classified in the monotypic family Abathomphalidae, which belongs to the superfamily Abathomphaloidea together with the family Globotruncanellidae.
