= Clavulinopsis (foraminifera) =

Clavulinopsis Temporal range: Late Cret (Camp - Maastr)

Scientific classification
- Domain: Eukaryota
- Clade: Sar
- Clade: Rhizaria
- Phylum: Retaria
- Subphylum: Foraminifera
- Class: Globothalamea
- Order: Textulariida
- Family: Pseudogaudryinidae
- Subfamily: Pseudogaudryininae
- Genus: †Clavulinopsis; Banner and Desai, 1985

Extinct genus of single-celled organisms

Clavulinopsis is a genus of foraminiferans from the Upper Cretaceous of the United States (Texas, Arkansas), included in the Textulariida. The type species is Clavulinopsis hofkeri Banner and Desai, 1985.

Clavulinopsis has a free aggulinated test with a considerable calcareous groundmass. The early stage is triserial, later abruptly becoming uniserial; cross section triangular. Sutures are slightly depressed, horizontal to slightly arched at the center of the flattened sides. Lateral walls are filled with fine micro-tubular cavities (term: canaliculate) that open into the chamber interiors, but are sealed externally by a finely agglutinated outer layer. Septa are solid, without micro-tubular cavities. The aperture is cribrate, with irregular pores at the end of a slightly produced neck.
