= Triloculinella =

Triloculinella Temporal range: Oligocene to Holocene

Scientific classification
- Domain: Eukaryota
- Clade: Sar
- Clade: Rhizaria
- Phylum: Retaria
- Subphylum: Foraminifera
- Class: Tubothalamea
- Order: Miliolida
- Family: Hauerinidae
- Genus: Triloculinella; Riccio, 1950

Genus of single-celled organisms

Triloculinella is a genus of Miliolacean forams with a fusiform to asymmetrically globular test. Inner chambers, one-half coil in length, are crypto-quinqueloculine to quinqueloculine in arrangement; The final three to five visible from the exterior. The aperture is an arch at the end of the final chamber, largely covered by a broad apertural flap, which distinguishes the genus from Triloculina, Quinqueloculina and such, characterized by a more narrow tooth. The wall, as for all miliolids, is calcareous, imperforate, porcelaneous.

The World Foraminifera Datavase has Quinquinella Vella, 1977, and Scutuloris Loeblich & Tappan, 1953 as synonyms of Triloculinella. Shows nine recognized species with two more accepted as Miliolinella and one other as Quinqueloculina. Defines Foraminifera as a phylum, rather than a class is in Sen Gupta 1999, within the Infrakingdom Rhizaria.

Imiges and illustrations of Triloculinella can be found at Triloculinella Foraminifera and Triloculinella in the World Foramiinifera Database.
