= Idalina =

Idalina Temporal range: Late Cretaceous

Scientific classification
- Domain: Eukaryota
- Clade: Sar
- Clade: Rhizaria
- Phylum: Retaria
- Subphylum: Foraminifera
- Class: Tubothalamea
- Order: Miliolida
- Family: Hauerinidae
- Genus: †Idalina; Schlumberger and Munier-Chalmas, 1884

Genus of single-celled organisms

Idalina is a genus of foraminifera included in the Hauerinidae, (Miliolida), that lived during the latter part of the Late Cretaceous.

The adult specimen is ovoid to fusiform. Ontogeny goes through an early quinqueloculine stage immediately following the proloculus, followed in sequence by triloculine and biloculine stages and finally to an adult stage with completely enveloping chambers. Wall, calcareous, imperforate, porcelaneous. Chambers with complete floors. Aperture in quinqueloculine and triloculine stages with a simple tooth. Aperture in adult stage, terminal, radially cribrate, with a convex trematophore (sieve plate) pierced by numerous irregular openings.

Loeblich and Tappan, (1988) include Idialina in the miliolid family Hauerinidae. Prior to, it was included in the Treatise (Loeblich and Tappan, (1964)), in the miliolid subfamily Miliolinae, which also includes the genus Hauerina. Idalina is known from the Upper Cretaceous (Senonian) of France.
