= Abadehella =

Abadehella Temporal range: Lopingian

Scientific classification
- Domain: Eukaryota
- (unranked): SAR
- (unranked): Rhizaria
- Superphylum: Retaria
- Phylum: Foraminifera
- Order: Fusulinida
- Superfamily: Tetrataxoidea
- Family: Abadehellidae
- Genus: Abadehella Okimura & Ishii, 1975

Genus of foraminifera (fossil)

Abadehella is a genus of large Upper Permian benthic forams in the order Fusulinida. It is the sole known genus of the family Abadahellidae, for which the diagnosis is the same. Abadahellidae was established by Loeblich and Tappan 1984; Abadahella by Okimura and Ishi, 1975.

The genus extends across the lowermost member of the Zewan Formation in Kashmir, the Palaeofusulina limestone in Malaysia, the Lepidolina multiseptata limestone in Cambodia and the Lepodlina mustipetata and Lepidolina kumaensis Zones in Japan.

== Physiology ==
Their outer test is conical, up to 1.35mm at the concave base, coiled trochospirally with up to twenty whorls, each with one and a half to two low chambers surrounding the open umbilicus. Chambers are subdivided by close, evenly spaced radial beams. The test wall is calcareous and two-layered, with an external wall with an outer dark microgranular layer and an inner light fibrous layer, septa and beams with a single micro-granular layer. The aperture from each chamber opens into the umbilical region beneath a short projection.

== See also ==
- List of prehistoric foraminiferans
