= Clavulina (foraminifera) =

Clavulina Temporal range: Paleocene - Holocene

Scientific classification
- Domain: Eukaryota
- Clade: Sar
- Clade: Rhizaria
- Phylum: Retaria
- Subphylum: Foraminifera
- Class: Globothalamea
- Order: Textulariida
- Family: Valvulinidae
- Subfamily: Valvulininae
- Genus: Clavulina d'Orbigny, 1826

Species
- See text

Genus of foraminiferan

Clavulina is a genus of aggulinated benthic foraminiferans with an elongate test. The early stage is triserial and triangular in section, the later stage uniserial and rectilinear, with angular to rounded section. In some species agglutinated walls have considerable calcareous cement. Septa are secondarily doubled as a result of imperforate floors, which are added as new chambers are formed. Walls contain fine bifurcating canaliculi within, openings of which are sealed internally by an inner organic lining, and externally by the imperforate surface layer of the wall. The aperture is interiomarginal in the early triserial stage, terminal and rounded in the adult.

The genus Clavulina was named by d'Orbigny, 1826. It is included in the textulariid family, Valvulinidae and is cosmopolitan in distribution, with a range extending from the Paleocene to now.

== Species ==
There are many species, extant and extinct, including:

- †Clavulina alazanensis Nuttall, 1932
- †Clavulina anglica Cushman, 1936
- Clavulina angularis d'Orbigny, 1826
- Clavulina arenata Cushman, 1933

Names brought to synonymy

- †Clavulina antipodum Stache, 1864 and †Clavulina elegans Karrer, 1864, synonyms for †Arenodosaria antipodum (Stache, 1864)
