= Pseudotrochamminita =

Scientific classification
- Domain: Eukaryota
- Clade: Sar
- Clade: Rhizaria
- Phylum: Retaria
- Subphylum: Foraminifera
- Class: Globothalamea
- Order: Lituolida
- Family: Haplophragmoididae
- Genus: Pseudotrochamminita; King, 2021

Multichambered foraminifera

Pseudotrochamminita are a genus of multichambered foraminifera, within the order of Lituolida.

== Taxonomy ==
The name Pseudotrochamminita, was derived from the Greek word pseudos and the genus Trochamminita, due to its appearance to resemble Trochamminita irregularis.

=== Specimens ===
The holotype of P. malcolmi is TF-1678, and the paratypes being TF-1679 and TF-1680.
