= Astrononion =

Astrononion Temporal range: M Eocene - Recent

Scientific classification
- Domain: Eukaryota
- Clade: Sar
- Clade: Rhizaria
- Phylum: Retaria
- Subphylum: Foraminifera
- Class: Globothalamea
- Order: Rotaliida
- Family: Astrononionidae
- Subfamily: Astrononioninae
- Genus: Astrononion; Cushman & Edwards, 1937

Genus of single-celled organisms

Astrononion is a genus of foraminiferans in the family Astrononionidae, characterized by an evolute planispiral test with radially stellate structures partly covering the sutures on either side. The test is free, bilaterally symmetrical; periphery broadly rounded; chambers distinct, separated by depressed radial sutures, increasing gradually in size, and usually inflated; aperture a low arched opening at the base of the face of the test. The wall is of finely perforate monolamellar granular calcite.

The secondary chamberlets in the original description of Cushman and Edwards 1937 that give the stellate appearance were noted by Loeblich and Tappan as resulting from non-porous flaps that project backwards from each chamber partly covering the preceding suture and umbilical region but leaving a small open cavity beneath, giving the appearance of secondary chamberlets.

Astrononion has a cosmopolitan distribution and is known from the Middle Eocene to the recent. Along with Fujinonion, Laminononion, and Pacinonion, it forms the subfamily Astononioninae.
