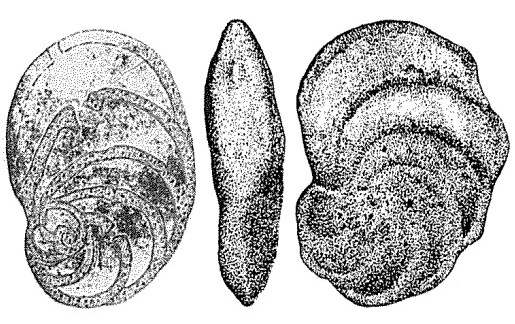

Scientific classification
- Domain: Eukaryota
- Clade: Diaphoretickes
- Clade: SAR
- Clade: Rhizaria
- Phylum: Retaria
- Subphylum: Foraminifera
- Class: Globothalamea
- Order: Lituolida
- Family: Lituolidae
- Genus: †Lamina; Voloshina, 1972
- Species: †L. irreperta

Binomial name
- †Lamina irreperta Voloshina, 1972

Synonyms
- Orbignyna (Lamina) Voloshina, 1972 (subgenus)

= Lamina irreperta =

Extinct species of foraminifera

Lamina is a monotypic fossil genus of agglutinated foraminifera belonging to the subfamily Ammomarginulinae. It contains the sole species Lamina irreperta, described in 1972.
