= Arenodosaria =

Arenodosaria Temporal range: 21.7–19.0 Ma

Scientific classification
- Domain: Eukaryota
- Clade: Sar
- Clade: Rhizaria
- Phylum: Retaria
- Subphylum: Foraminifera
- Class: Globothalamea
- Order: Textulariida
- Family: Eggerellidae
- Subfamily: Dorothiinae
- Genus: †Arenodosaria; Finlay, 1939

Species
- See text

Extinct genus of single-celled organisms

Arenodosaria is an extinct genus of foraminiferans. The species are known from the Miocene of New Zealand.

== Species ==
- †Arenodosaria antipodum (Stache, 1864) (syn. †Clavulina antipodum Stache, 1864 and †Clavulina elegans Karrer, 1864)
- †Arenodosaria kaiataensis Dorreen, 1948
- †Arenodosaria turris Kennett, 1967

Names brought to synonymy

- †Arenodosaria antipoda (Stache, 1864) accepted as †Arenodosaria antipodum (Stache, 1864)
- †Arenodosaria robusta (Stache, 1864) accepted as †Arenodosaria antipodum (Stache, 1864)
