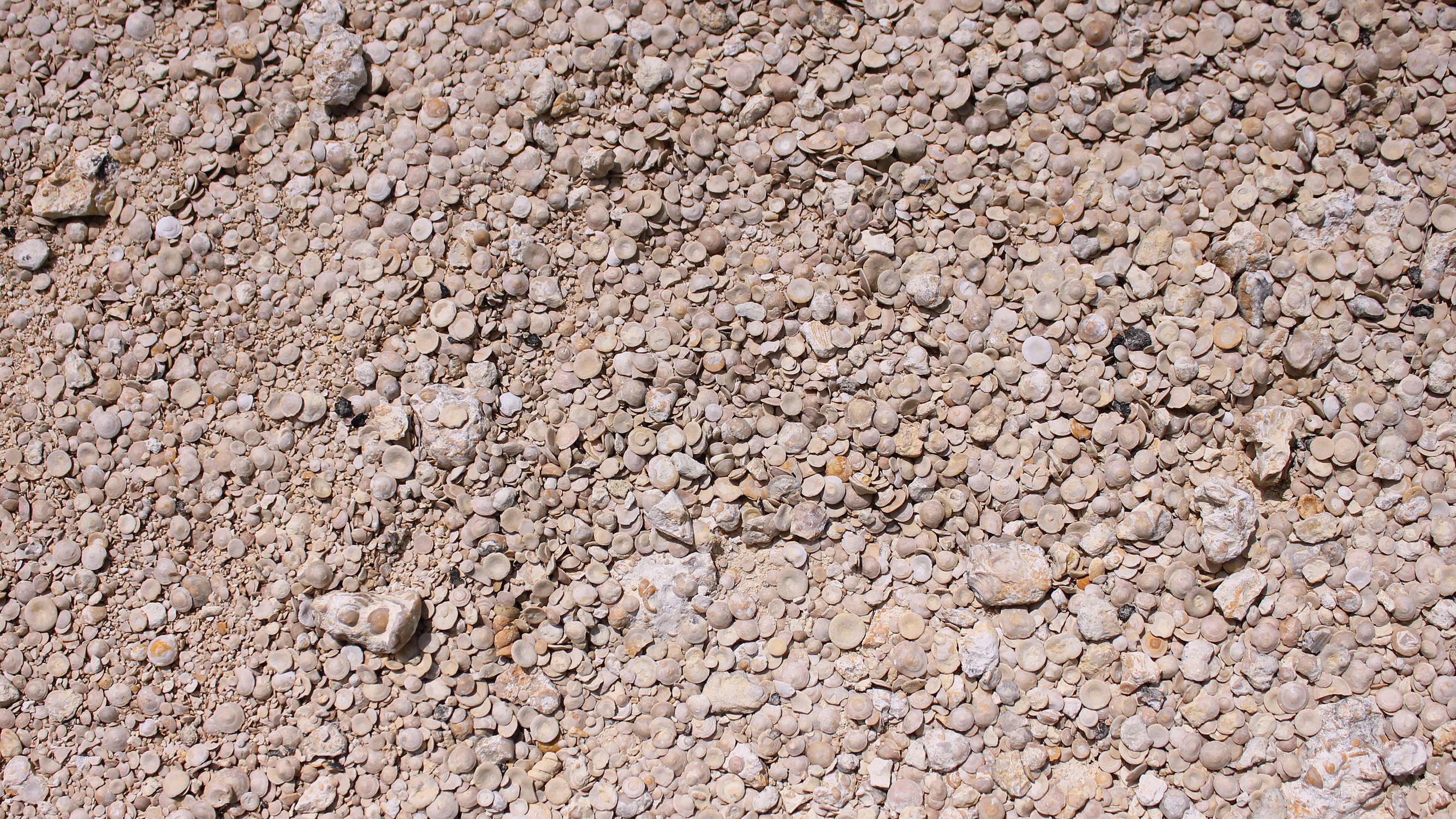

Scientific classification
- Domain: Eukaryota
- Clade: Sar
- Clade: Rhizaria
- Phylum: Retaria
- Subphylum: Foraminifera
- Class: Globothalamea
- Order: Textulariida
- Family: †Orbitolinidae
- Subfamily: †Orbitolininae
- Genus: †Orbitolina; Lamarck 1816

Species
- Orbitolina concava Lamarck, 1816; Orbitolina discoideaconoidea Gras, 1852; Orbitolina lenticulata Lamarck, 1816

= Orbitolina =

Orbitolina Temporal range: Aptian-Cenomanian ~125–95 Ma

Extinct genus of foraminifera

Orbitolina is an extinct genus of foraminifera belonging to the order Textulariida and family Orbitolinidae. Fossils of this genus are widely found in beds deposited in the Tethys Ocean ranging from Aptian (early Cretaceous) to Cenomanian (early Late Cretaceous) in age. It has been used as a shallow carbonate platform facies marker and as a Cretaceous index fossil.

The test of the organism has the shape of a cone, with the proloculus (initial chamber) at the apex of the cone and increasingly large cuplike chambers forming the remainder of the test. Each chamber is further subdivided by numerous partitions.
