= Cibusoides elegans =

Cibusoides elegans Temporal range: Recent

Scientific classification
- Domain: Eukaryota
- (unranked): SAR
- (unranked): Rhizaria
- Superphylum: Retaria
- Phylum: Foraminifera
- Order: Rotaliida
- Family: Heterolepidae
- Genus: Cibusoides
- Species: C. elegans

Binomial name
- Cibusoides elegans Saidova, 1975

Species of benthonic foraminífera from the Pacific Ocean

Cibusoides elegans is a species of benthonic foraminifera from the Pacific Ocean.
