= Ismailia (foraminifera) =

Scientific classification
- Domain: Eukaryota
- Clade: Sar
- Clade: Rhizaria
- Phylum: Retaria
- Subphylum: Foraminifera
- Class: Globothalamea
- Order: Loftusiida
- Family: Charenitidae
- Genus: Ismailia; El-Dakkak, 1974

Genus of single-celled organisms

Ismailia is a genus of foraminifera with an agglutinated, planispirally coiled, semi-involute shell, known from the Egyptian Sinai. It lived during the early part of the Late Cretaceous (Cenomanian). Agglutinated shells (or tests) are composed of selected foreign material cemented together.

Ismailia, named by El-Dakkak (1974, is assigned to the family Charenitidae and the superfamily Biokovinacea, which are now included in the order Loftusiida, established by Kaminski & Mikhalevich in 2004. Previously, both the Loftusiacea and Biokovinacea, along with other superfamilies, were included in the order Textulariida.
