= Beedeina =

Beedeina Temporal range: Moscovian ~311–306 Ma

Scientific classification
- Domain: Eukaryota
- Clade: Sar
- Clade: Rhizaria
- Phylum: Retaria
- Subphylum: Foraminifera
- Class: Globothalamea (?)
- Order: †Fusulinida
- Family: †Fusulinidae
- Subfamily: †Beedeininae
- Genus: †Beedeina; Galloway, 1933

Species
- Beedeina samarica Rauser-Chernoussova et al., 1940; Beedeina schellwieni Staff, 1912

Extinct genus of foram

Beedeina is an extinct genus of fusulinid belonging to the family Fusulinidae. These have been found in rock strata from the Moscovian Stage.
