= Hormosinoidea =

Hormosinoidea Temporal range: M Ordovician - Recent

Scientific classification
- Domain: Eukaryota
- Clade: Sar
- Clade: Rhizaria
- Phylum: Retaria
- Subphylum: Foraminifera
- Class: Globothalamea
- Order: Textulariida
- Superfamily: Hormosinoidea; Haeckel, 1894

Families
- Aschemocellidae; Cribratinidae; Dusenburyinidae; Haplophragmoididae; Hormosinidae; Telamminidae; Thomasinellidae

Synonyms
- Hormosinacea

Superfamily of single-celled organisms

The Hormosinoidea is a superfamily of agglutinated foraminifera in the Textulariida, with a range that extends from the Middle Ordovician, that unites seven families (as indicated) characterized by multilocular tests, (more than one chamber after the proloculus), in a uniserial arrangement.
