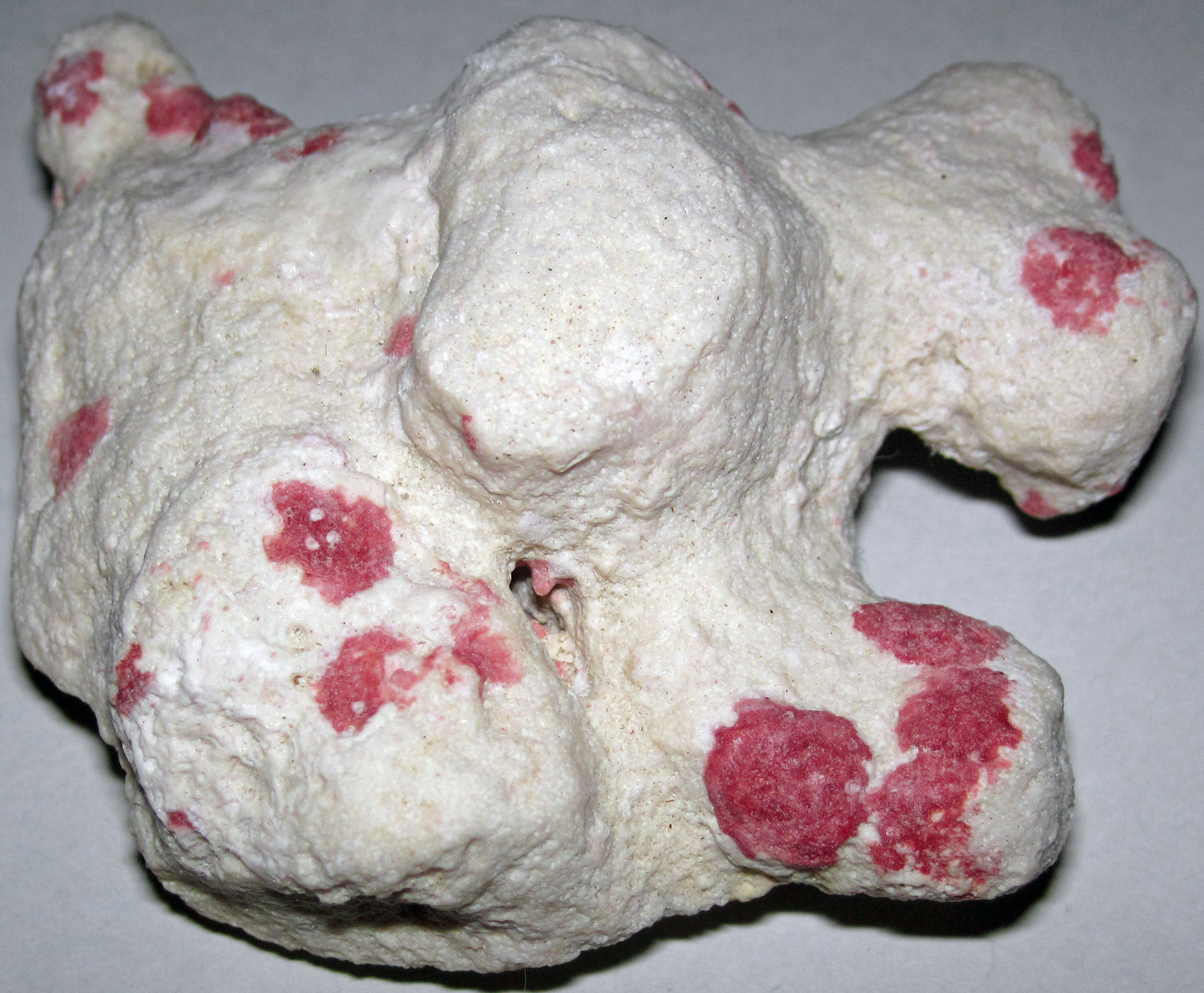
- Homotrema rubrum. Encrusting foraminifera on an eroded coral clast from the Holocene of the Bahamas.

Scientific classification
- Domain: Eukaryota
- Clade: Sar
- Clade: Rhizaria
- Phylum: Retaria
- Subphylum: Foraminifera
- Class: Globothalamea
- Order: Rotaliida
- Family: Homotrematidae
- Genus: Homotrema
- Species: H. rubrum

Binomial name
- Homotrema rubrum (Lamarck, 1816)

Synonyms
- Homotrema rubrum; Millepor rubra

= Homotrema rubrum =

Species of single-celled organism

Homotrema rubrum is a colonial foraminifer. It was originally discovered by Jean-Baptiste Lamarck. It is a strong red in colour. It grows on coral rubble found on the reef crest in tropical waters. Ground by the surf into sand-sized pieces, it is what gives Bermuda beaches a pink tint.

The name Homotrema rubra, which is sometimes used for this species, is not accepted. The original name given by Lamarck was Millepora rubra, and the accepted name is Homotrema rubrum.
