= Heterolepa =

Heterolepa Temporal range: Maastrichtian-Holocene

Scientific classification
- Domain: Eukaryota
- Clade: Sar
- Clade: Rhizaria
- Phylum: Retaria
- Subphylum: Foraminifera
- Class: Globothalamea
- Order: Rotaliida
- Family: Cibicididae
- Genus: Heterolepa; Franzenau, 1884

Type species
- Heterolepa simplex Franzenau, 1884

Synonyms
- Cibusoides Saidova, 1975; Pseudotruncatulina Andreae, 1884; Crawfordoides McCulloch, 1981

Genus of single-celled organisms

Heterolepa is a genus of benthonic foraminifera closely related to the genera Cibicides and Cibicidoides.
