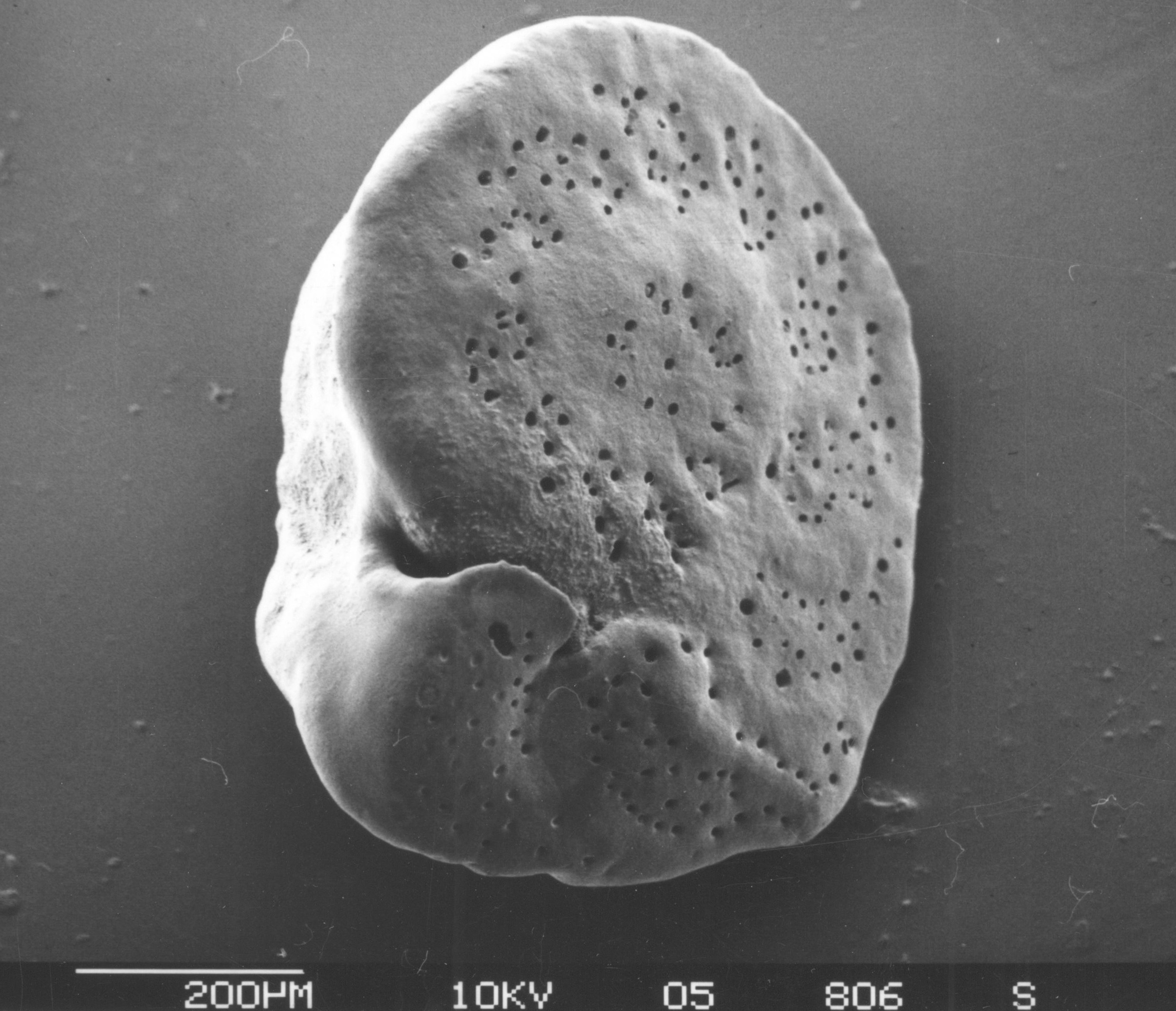
- Cibicides lobatulus

Scientific classification
- Domain: Eukaryota
- Clade: Sar
- Clade: Rhizaria
- Phylum: Retaria
- Subphylum: Foraminifera
- Class: Globothalamea
- Order: Rotaliida
- Family: Cibicididae
- Subfamily: Cibicidinae
- Genus: Cibicides; Montfort, 1808

Species
- Many, including: †Cibicides elegans Bermúdez, 1949; Cibicides lobatulus

= Cibicides =

Cibicides Temporal range: ?Cret, Pal - Recent

Genus of foraminifers

Cibicides is a genus of cosmopolitan benthic foraminifera known from at least as far back as the Paleocene (Loeblich & Tappan, 1988) that extends down to the present.

The test, or shell, of Cibicides, which is commonly found attached, is multichambered, plano-convex, trochospiral, with a flat or dished-out evolute spiral side and a strongly arched, involute umbilical side. The test wall is calcareous, perforate, bilamellar, with a radial microstructure. The flat or nearly flat spiral side is coarsely perforate while the arched umbilical side is finely perforate. The apertural face and peripheral keel, where the two faces meet, are imperforate. Sutures on the spiral side are thickened and may be elevated, but are narrow and depressed on the umbilical side. The aperture a low interior-marginal equatorial opening that extends a short distance onto the umbilical side but continues along the spiral suture on the spiral side.

Cibicides, named by Montfort, 1808, is included in the subfamily Cibicidinae, family Cibicididae, superfamily Planorbulinoidea; suborder Rotaliina in Loeblich and Tappan, 1987 and order Rotaliida in Loeblack and Tappan, 1992. It was put, instead, in the Orbitoidoidea in Loeblcih and Tappan, 1964, in the Treatise Part C, and in the Anomalinidae in Cushman, 1950.
