= Fusulinidae =

Fusulinidae Temporal range: L Penn - U Perm

Scientific classification
- Domain: Eukaryota
- Clade: Sar
- Clade: Rhizaria
- Phylum: Retaria
- Subphylum: Foraminifera
- Class: Globothalamea (?)
- Order: †Fusulinida
- Superfamily: †Fusulinoidea
- Family: †Fusulinidae; Van Möller, 1878

Family of foraminifera (fossil)

The Fusulinidae is a family of fusulinoidean foraminifera from the upper Carboniferous (Lower Pennsylvanian, Morrowan) to the Upper Permian (Guadalupian), tests of which are fusiform to subcylindrical with walls of two to four layers. Are planispirally coiled throughout or with early whorls at a distinct angle to the later plane of coiling. Septa, flat to well fluted; tunnel, single; chomata variable in development.

== Taxonomy ==
The Fusulinidae is divided into the following subfamilies, ordered as in Loeblich and Tappan, 1988.

Fusulinellinae, Staff and Wedekind 1910.
Fusulinidae with flat or slightly fluted septa, wall of three or four layers including diaphanotheca and generally pronounced outer tectorium. U Carb - U Permian (as for the family)

Fusulininae, Von Möller 1878
Fusulinidae in which the septa are moderately to strongly fluted, wall is composed of 2 to 4 layers including diaphanotheca, the outer tectoria is weakly developed or absent, and chomata or pseudochomata may be present. Upper Carboniferous - Lower Permian (Wolfcamian/Sakmarian)

Eofusulininae, Rauzer-Chernousova & Rosovskaya, 1959.
Early Fusulinidae from the Upper Carboniferous (Moscovian), commonly with only three or four whorls, thin and weakly differentiated walls, inconsistent outer tectorium, prominent axial fillings and a possibility of chomata.

Wedekindellininae, F. Kahler & G Kahler, 1966
Middle and Upper Pennsylvanian ( U Carb) Fusulinidae; test fusiform; septa flat with little or no fluting; wall of 3 or 4 layers; chomata prominent.
