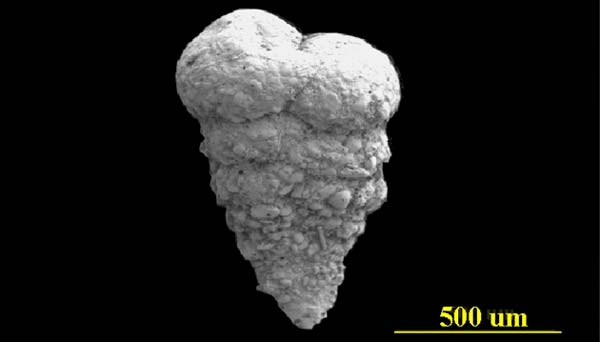
- Textularia

Scientific classification
- Domain: Eukaryota
- Clade: Sar
- Clade: Rhizaria
- Phylum: Retaria
- Subphylum: Foraminifera
- Class: Globothalamea
- Order: Textulariida
- Superfamily: Textularioidea; Ehrenberg, 1838

Families
- Textulariidae; Chrysalidinidae; Eggerellidae; Glaucoamminidae; Pseudogaudryinidae; Valvulamminidae; Valvulinidae

= Textularioidea =

Textularioidea Temporal range: M Jurassic - Recent

Superfamily of single-celled organisms

Textularioidea is a superfamily of Middle Jurassic to Holocene agglutinated benthic textulariid Foraminifera. Tests are trochospiral, triserial, or biserial in early stages; later may be biserial or uniserial. Walls are agglutinated, made of gathered material cemented together and are canaliculate - contain micro-tubular cavities extending between the inner and outer surfaces.

Textularioidea comprises eight families, as indicated.
