= Buccella =

Buccella may refer to:

- Concettina Buccella, Italian electrical engineer
- Maria Grazia Buccella (born 1940), Italian glamour model and film actress
- Buccella (foraminifera), a genus of late Cenozoic benthic foraminifera
- Buccella, a frazione of Vigevano, Pavia, Lombardy, Italy

== See also ==
- Buccellati, an Italian jewellery and watch company
