= Rotorboides =

Scientific classification
- Domain: Eukaryota
- Clade: Sar
- Clade: Rhizaria
- Phylum: Retaria
- Subphylum: Foraminifera
- Class: Globothalamea
- Order: Rotaliida
- Family: Rosalinidae
- Genus: Rotorboides; Sellier de Civrieux, 1977

Genus of single-celled organisms

Rotorboides is a genus of recent (Holocene) bottom dwelling (benthic) forams from the Atlantic, Pacific and Indian Oceans, related to Rosalina.

The test is trochospiral and planoconvex, with a broadly rounded periphery and about six to nine chambers in the final whorl. Sutures on the spiral side are crescentic and strongly oblique. Chambers on the umbilical side are subtriangular, each with a triangular folium, or flap, that extends into the umbilical area, folia of successive chambers fuse to form an umbilical plate that is solid or has only rare perforations. Sutures on the umbilical side are radial and deeply incised. The test wall is calcareous, coarsely perforate on the spiral side, but imperforate adjacent to the sutures. The umbilical side is imperforate and smooth. The aperture is an interiomarginal arch, outside the umbilicus, extending nearly to the periphery.
