= Nothia =

Nothia is the genus name of:

- Nothia (plant), a fossil vascular plant from the Early Devonian.
- Nothia (foraminifera), a fossil genus of foraminiferans in the class Monothalamea.
