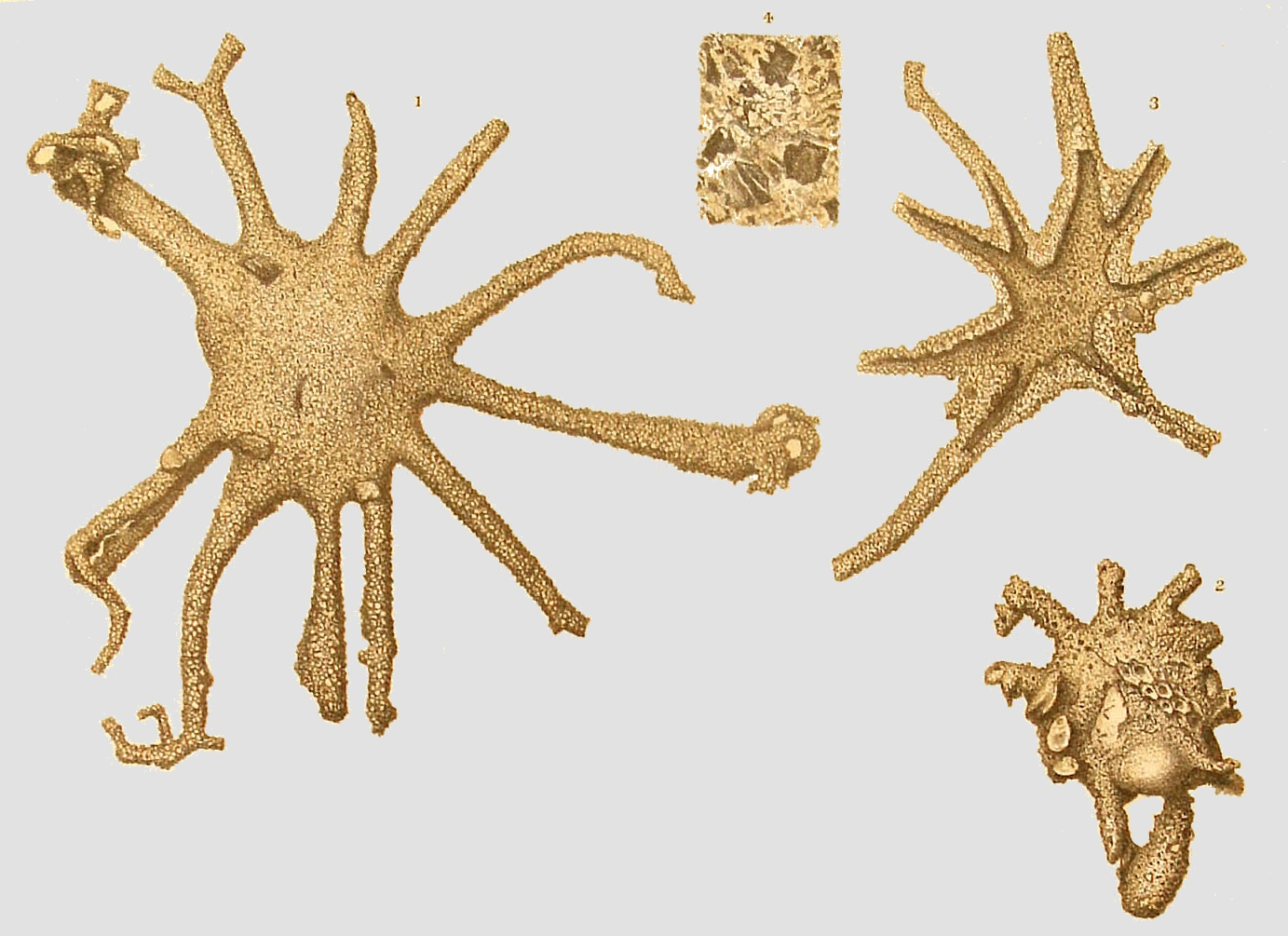
- Astrorhiza limicola

Scientific classification
- Domain: Eukaryota
- Clade: Sar
- Clade: Rhizaria
- Phylum: Retaria
- Subphylum: Foraminifera
- Class: Astrorhizata
- Subclass: Astrorhizana; Saidova, 1981

Orders
- Astrorhizida; Dendrofryida; Hippocrepinida; Saccamminida

= Astrorhizana =

Astrorhizana Temporal range: Cambrian - Recent

Subclass of single-celled organisms

Astrorhizana are a subclass of foraminifera characterized by simple tests composed of agglutinated material that can be irregular, spheroidal, or tubular and straight, branching or enrolled. Tests are non septate and consist of a single chamber following the proloculus. These are the Ammodiscacea of the Textulariina in the Treatise Part C, (Loeblich & Tappan 1964) that range from the Cambrian to Recent.

Four orders are included, the Astrorhizida, Dendrofryida, Hippocrepinida, and Saccamminida.
