= Homotrema =

Scientific classification
- Domain: Eukaryota
- Clade: Sar
- Clade: Rhizaria
- Phylum: Retaria
- Subphylum: Foraminifera
- Class: Globothalamea
- Order: Rotaliida
- Family: Homotrematidae
- Genus: Homotrema; Hickson, 1911

Genus of foraminifers

Homotrema is a genus of foraminifers belonging to the family Homotrematidae.

The species of this genus are found in subtropical and tropical regions.

Species:

- Homotrema hemispherica McCulloch, 1977
- Homotrema pacifica McCulloch, 1977
- Homotrema rubrum (Lamarck, 1816)
- Homotrema singaporensis McCulloch, 1977
