= Valvulinidae =

Valvulinidae Temporal range: Paleocene - Recent

Scientific classification
- Domain: Eukaryota
- Clade: Sar
- Clade: Rhizaria
- Phylum: Retaria
- Subphylum: Foraminifera
- Class: Globothalamea
- Order: Textulariida
- Superfamily: Textularioidea
- Family: Valvulinidae; Berthelin, 1880

Subfamilies
- Siphobigenerininae; Tritaxilininae; Valvulininae

Family of single-celled organisms

The Valvulinidae is a family of Paleocene to recent benthic textulariid Foraminifera characterized by trochospiral tests in the early stage which may become uniserial in the later. Walls are of cemented agglutinated material and have cavities created by micro-tubules, i.e. are canaliculate. Apertures have a valvular tooth or flap, at least in early stage, but may become multiple and areal in the later stage.

Three subfamilies have been defined, the Valvulininae, Siphobigenerininae, and Tritaxilininae.
