= Fabiania (foraminifera) =

Fabiania Temporal range: Late Paleoc - Late Eoc

Scientific classification
- Domain: Eukaryota
- Clade: Sar
- Clade: Rhizaria
- Phylum: Retaria
- Subphylum: Foraminifera
- Class: Globothalamea
- Order: Rotaliida
- Family: Cymbaloporidae
- Subfamily: †Fabianiinae
- Genus: †Fabiania; A. Silvestri, 1924

Genus of foraminifers

Fabiania is a genus of large fossil benthic calcareous forams with a range extending from the Upper Paleocene to the Upper Eocene.

The test, which is up to 4 mm in diameter, is in the shape of a more-or-less flattened cone with hollow center and bluntly rounded apex. The outer wall is thick and finely perforate, umbilical side and partitions imperforate, surface smooth to papillate: aperture in the earliest chambers a simple arch, later with a single row of large openings leading into the broad open umbilicus. The test begins with three thick-walled and perforate globose chambers. followed by a few chambers about one-half coil in length. with later chambers added in cyclic series or tiers. Short horizontal and vertical partitions arising from the inside of the outer wall form numerous coarse alveoli that, in turn, are subdivided by second order partitions into smaller alveoli. Horizontal sutures formed by the chamber tiers are depressed and distinct. Alveolar partitions are evident externally only on abraded specimens.

Fabiania was named by A. Silvestri, 1924, and is assigned to the Cymbaloporidae, Planorbulinacea, Rotaliida. Fabiania is included in the Fabianiinae which also includes Eofabiania from the middle Eocene of California and Gunteria from the middle Eocene of the Caribbean region, and is distinct in having a world-wide distribution and a larger stratigraphic range.
