= Hastigerinella =

Scientific classification
- Domain: Eukaryota
- Clade: Sar
- Clade: Rhizaria
- Phylum: Retaria
- Subphylum: Foraminifera
- Class: Globothalamea
- Order: Rotaliida
- Family: Hastigerinidae
- Genus: Hastigerinella; Cushman, 1927
- Species: H. digitata

Binomial name
- Hastigerinella digitata (Rhumbler, 1911)

Genus of single-celled organisms

Hastigerinella is a marine, unicellular genus of foraminiferan. Its only species is Hastigerinella digitata, which measures about 2 mm (0.079 in).
