= Wedekindellina =

Wedekindellina Temporal range: Moscovian ~311–309 Ma

Scientific classification
- Domain: Eukaryota
- Clade: Sar
- Clade: Rhizaria
- Phylum: Retaria
- Subphylum: Foraminifera
- Class: Globothalamea (?)
- Order: †Fusulinida
- Family: †Fusulinellidae
- Subfamily: †Wedekindellininae
- Genus: †Wedekindellina; Dunbar and Henbest, 1933

Species
- See text

Extinct genus of fusulinid

Wedekindellina is an extinct genus of fusulinid.

== Species ==
- Wedekindellina alveolata Stewart, 1992
- Wedekindellina fluxa Wilde, 2006
- Wedekindellina henbesti Skinner, 1931
- Wedekindellina plena Wilde, 2006
- Wedekindellina pseudohenbesti Wilde, 2006
- Wedekindellina rossi Wilde, 2006
- Wedekindellina similis Wilde, 2006
- Wedekindellina uralica Dutkevich, 1934
