= Sorites =

Sorites may refer to:

- Polysyllogism, a chain of syllogisms
- Sorites paradox, also referred to as the paradox of the heap
- Sorites (journal), a philosophy journal edited by Lorenzo Peña
- Sorites (foraminifera), a genus of foraminifera in the family Soritidae
