= Gansserina =

Gansserina Temporal range: Late Cretaceous (Maastrichtian)

Scientific classification
- Domain: Eukaryota
- Clade: Sar
- Clade: Rhizaria
- Phylum: Retaria
- Subphylum: Foraminifera
- Class: Globothalamea
- Order: Rotaliida
- Family: †Globotruncanidae
- Subfamily: †Globotruncaninae
- Genus: †Gansserina; Bolli 1951

Type species
- Gansserina gansseri (Bolli, 1951)

Genus of single-celled organisms

Gansserina is a genus of planktonic foraminifera, included in the globigerinid family Globotruncanidae, that had a fairly wide distribution in the Late Cretaceous (Maastrichtian). The type species is Gansserina gansseri.

The test of Gansserina is coiled in a low to flat trochospiral. The spiral side is flat, with curved, raised and oblique sutures. The umbilical side is convex with radial depressed sutures and a wide umbilicus containing portici (asymmetrical apertural flaps) and tegilla (umbilical coverings). A distinct peripheral keel runs along the edge of the spiral side while the periphery on the umbilical side may have an incompletely developed keel formed by pustules. Early chambers are globular, later ones rhomboidal in section. The wall is calcareous, perforate and pustulate, especially on the umbilical side. The primary aperture is interiomarginal, bordered by a wide porticus (flap).

Gansserina gansseri, based on stable isotope study (C_{13} and O_{18}) of specimens from Lower Maastrichtian marine sediments, is thought to have lived at intermediate depths, within the paleothermocline.
