= Cuneus (disambiguation) =

Cuneus is part of the brain.

Cuneus may also refer to:

- an architectural term; see Glossary_of_architecture#C
- Cuneus (entomology), a wedge-shaped section of the forewing of certain heteropteran bugs
- Cuneus (foraminifera, a genus of uni-cellular creatures
- Cuneus (Lusitania), a region of the Roman Province of Lusitania
