= Semirosalina =

Semirosalina Temporal range: Lower/Early Miocene

Scientific classification
- Domain: Eukaryota
- Clade: Sar
- Clade: Rhizaria
- Phylum: Retaria
- Subphylum: Foraminifera
- Class: Globothalamea
- Order: Rotaliida
- Family: Rosalinidae
- Genus: †Semirosalina; Hornibrook. 1961

Genus of single-celled organisms

Semirosalina is a genus of foraminifera from the Lower Miocene of New Zealand, related to Rosalina, included in discorboidean family Rosalinidae. The test is a small trochospiral coil of few whorls with a few subglobular chambers per whorl. The test wall is thin and finely perforate. The aperture at the umbilical margin of the apertural face.

Semirosalina differs from Rosalina in being smaller in size, having fewer chambers, and an inflated rather than a flattened test.
