= Triloculinoides =

Triloculinoides Temporal range: M Miocene - Recent

Scientific classification
- Domain: Eukaryota
- Clade: Sar
- Clade: Rhizaria
- Phylum: Retaria
- Subphylum: Foraminifera
- Class: Tubothalamea
- Order: Miliolida
- Family: Hauerinidae
- Genus: Triloculinoides; Shchedrina, 1964

Genus of single-celled organisms

Triloculinoides is a genus of Miocene to recent forams, included in the miliolid family Hauerinidae, resembling Triloculina except for the aperture, which in the adult stage the forks of the bifid tooth join to form a ring.

Triloculinoides has been found in Australia, the Sea of Japan, the Okhotsk Sea and Greenland Sea.
