= H. legrandi =

H. legrandi may refer to a few different species. The specific epithet legrandi refers to someone with the surname 'Legrand'

- †Halenia legrandi, a foram in the family Palaeospiroplectamminidae
- Haplophthalmus legrandi, a woodlouse in the family Trichoniscidae
- Hayashichroma legrandi, a longhorn beetle in the family Cerambycidae
- Hypotacha legrandi, a moth in the family Noctuidae
