= Fissurina (foraminifera) =

Fissurina Temporal range: Cretaceous - Recent.

Scientific classification
- Domain: Eukaryota
- (unranked): SAR
- (unranked): Rhizaria
- Superphylum: Retaria
- Phylum: Foraminifera
- Order: Lagenida
- Superfamily: Nodosarioidea
- Family: Ellipsolagenidae
- Genus: Fissurina Reuss, 1850

Genus of single-celled organisms

Fissurina is a genus of unilocular (single chambered) calcareous forams, similar in general form to Lagena, but included in the nodosarioidean family Ellipsolagenidae, Lagenida.

Fissurina has a small shell (test) that is rounded to egg-shaped in outline and lens-like in cross-section, sometimes edged with one or more sharp ridges (keels). The wall is made of clear calcium carbonate with very fine pores; the surface is smooth and dotted with tiny pits that can be scattered or arranged in rows. The opening (aperture) sits at the tip in a shallow groove and ranges from oval to a slit. Inside, a thin tube (the entosolenian tube) extends from the opening; it can run down the centre or curve to one side and attach to the inner wall. Fissurina is known from the Cretaceous to the present (Holocene), i.e., from about 145 million years ago to today.
