= Millerella =

Millerella Temporal range: Carboniferous ~339–300 Ma

Scientific classification
- Domain: Eukaryota
- Clade: Sar
- Clade: Rhizaria
- Phylum: Retaria
- Subphylum: Foraminifera
- Class: Globothalamea (?)
- Order: †Fusulinida
- Family: †Eostaffellidae
- Genus: †Millerella; Thompson, 1942

Species
- Millerella marblensis Thompson, 1942; Millerella pura Malakova, 1956

Extinct genus of fusulinid

Millerella is an extinct genus of fusulinid belonging to the family Eostaffellidae. Fossils of the genus have been found in Carboniferous beds in North America and central Asia.
