= Pavonia =

Pavonia may refer to:

== Localities ==
- In New Jersey, United States:
  - Pavonia Ferry, former ferry service between New York City and Jersey City
  - Pavonia, Jersey City, a section of Newport, Jersey City
  - Pavonia, New Netherland, the Dutch settlement that was to become Hudson County, New Jersey
  - Pavonia/Newport, former name of the Newport (PATH station) mass transit station in Jersey City
  - Pavonia-Newport (HBLR station), a light rail station in Jersey City
  - Pavonia Terminal, the former Erie Railroad terminal on the Hudson River in Jersey City
  - Pavonia Yard, a rail classification yard in Camden, New Jersey
- Elsewhere:
  - Pavonia Island, old name for Fernando de Noronha Island offshore the Brazilian coast

== Organisms ==
- Pavonia (plant), a plant genus in the family Malvaceae
- Pavonia Ruiz et Pavon, a plant genus now considered a synonym of Laurelia in the family Atherospermataceae
- Pavonia Lamarck (1816), a unjustified emendation for the stony coral genus Pavona
- Pavonia Hübner [1819], an invalid name of the moth genus Saturnia
- Pavonia Godart (1824), an invalid name of the brush-footed butterfly genus Opsiphanes of tribe Brassolini
- Pavonia d'Orbigny (1846), a misspelling of the rotaliidan foram genus Pavonina
