= Stetsonia =

Stetsonia is the scientific name of two genera of organisms and may refer to:

- Stetsonia (foraminifera), a genus of foraminifera in the family Pseudoparrellidae
- Stetsonia (plant), a genus of plants in the cactus family
