= Lagynana =

Lagynana Temporal range: Late Cambrian - Recent

Scientific classification
- Domain: Eukaryota
- Clade: Sar
- Clade: Rhizaria
- Phylum: Retaria
- Subphylum: Foraminifera
- Class: Astrorhizata
- Subclass: Lagynana; Mikhalevich, 1980

Subclass of single-celled organisms

Lagynana is a subclass of foraminifera which comprises Astrorhizata with membranous or pseudochitinous tests that may have ferruginous encrustations or more rarely small quantities of agglutinated material. The Lagynacea Schultze, 1854, of the Allogriomiina, (Loeblich and Tappan 1964) is fairly equivalent.

Genera with flagellate gametes are included in the Lagynidae, those with amoeboid gametes are included in the Allogromiidae.
