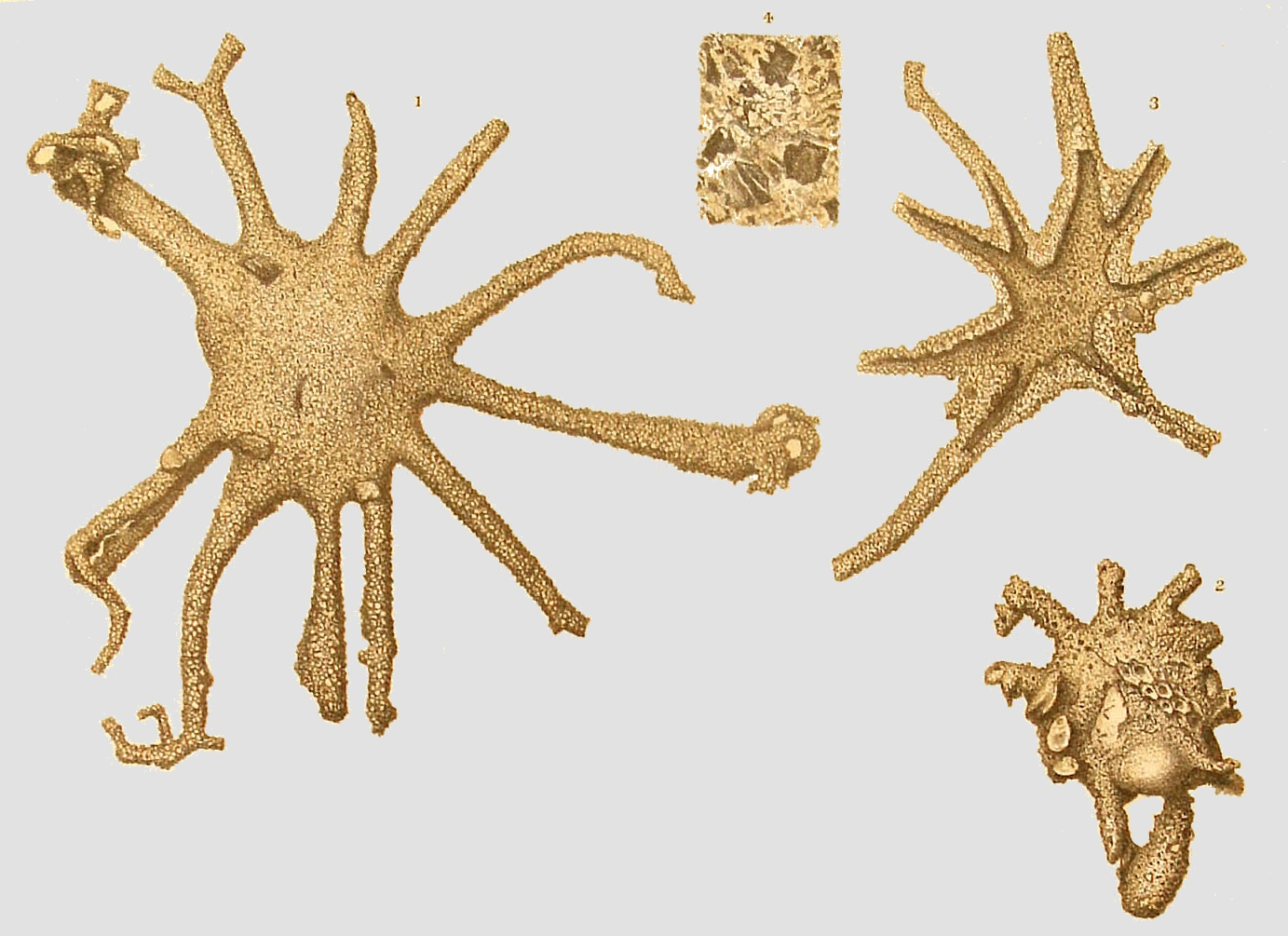
- Astrorhiza limicola

Scientific classification
- Domain: Eukaryota
- Clade: Sar
- Clade: Rhizaria
- Phylum: Retaria
- Subphylum: Foraminifera
- Class: Astrorhizata; Mikhalevich, 1980

Subclasses
- Astrorhizana; Lagynana

= Astrorhizata =

Astrorhizata Temporal range: Cambrian – Recent

Class of single-celled organisms

Astrorhizata is a class within the foraminifera that comprises those species with primitive unilocular, (single chambered), tests composed of aggulinated material or microgranular calcite. Forms may be subspherical, elongated, or irregular and may appear to become multichambered during growth.

Two subclasses are included, the Astrorhizana which includes four orders, the Astrothizida, Dendrofryida, Hippocrepinida, and Saccamminida, and the Lagynana with the Allogromiida.

The Monothalamea as emended by Pawlowski et al., 2013, is nearly equivalent to the Astrorhizata Mikhalevich, 1980; the primary difference being the inclusion of the superfamily Xenophyrophoroidea in the Monothalamea.
