= Sigmoilinita =

Sigmoilinita Temporal range: Miocene - Recent

Scientific classification
- Domain: Eukaryota
- Clade: Sar
- Clade: Rhizaria
- Phylum: Retaria
- Subphylum: Foraminifera
- Class: Tubothalamea
- Order: Miliolida
- Family: Hauerinidae
- Genus: Sigmoilinita; Seiglie, 1965

Genus of single-celled organisms

Sigmoilinita is a miliolid genus (Foraminifera) with an ovate to fusiform test that becomes flattened with growth. Chambers are tubular, one-half coil in length, at first added in a sigmoiline (S-shaped) series starting at slightly more than 180° apart. the angle gradually decreasing until the later whorls are planispiral. Chambers are numerous, the wall narrow. imperforate, porcelaneous. The aperture at the end of the final chamber may have a weakly developed tooth.
