= Bradyina =

Bradyina Temporal range: Carboniferous-Permian

Scientific classification
- Domain: Eukaryota
- Clade: Sar
- Clade: Rhizaria
- Phylum: Retaria
- Subphylum: Foraminifera
- Class: †Fusulinata
- Family: †Bradyinidae
- Genus: †Bradyina

Species
- B. cribrostomata Rauser-Chernousova and Reitlinger 1937

Extinct genus of fusulinid

Bradyina is an extinct genus of fusulinid belonging to the family Bradyinidae. Specimens of the genus have been found in Carboniferous to Permian beds in Europe, Asia, and North America. The genus has been used as an index fossil in China.
