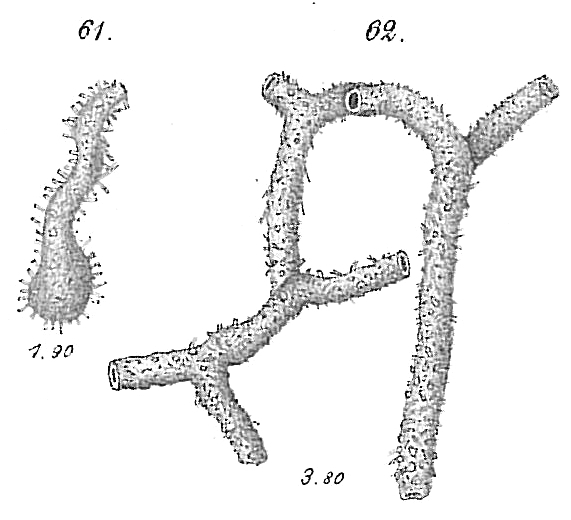
- Saccorhiza ramosa

Scientific classification
- Domain: Eukaryota
- Clade: Sar
- Clade: Rhizaria
- Phylum: Retaria
- Subphylum: Foraminifera
- Class: Monothalamea
- Order: Astrorhizida
- Family: Hippocrepinidae
- Subfamily: Saccorhizinae
- Genus: Saccorhiza; Eimer & Fickert (1899)

Type species
- Saccorhiza ramosa (Brady (1879)) Eimer & Fickert (1899)

Species
- S. abiagna; S. affixa; †S. anceps; S. atlantica; S. attrita; S. calcilega; S. delicata; †S. dimera; S. echinata; †S. flexiliramosa; †S. fragilis; S. glabrilocula; S. luctuosa; S. praealta; S. ramosa; S. spiculitubula; †S. surculus; S. zankevichi

Synonyms
- Hyperammina (Saccorhiza) Hofker (1972) (subgenus); Pseudoschizammina Saidova (1975)

= Saccorhiza (foraminifera) =

Genus of foraminifera

Saccorhiza is a genus of foraminifera belonging to the subfamily Saccorhizinae and containing 18 species. Its type species was discovered by H.B. Brady and described as Hyperammina ramosa in 1879, but was later separated into its own genus in 1899.
