= Pavonina =

Scientific classification
- Domain: Eukaryota
- Clade: Sar
- Clade: Rhizaria
- Phylum: Retaria
- Subphylum: Foraminifera
- Class: Globothalamea
- Order: Rotaliida
- Family: Pavoninidae
- Genus: Pavonina d'Orbigny, 1826

Species
- Pavonina caribana Sellier de Civrieux, 1981; Pavonina flabelliformis d'Orbigny, 1826; Pavonina panayensis McCulloch, 1977

Synonyms
- Valvopavonina Hofker, 1951

Genus of foraminifers

Pavonina is a genus of foraminifers in the family Pavoninidae.
