= Cuneus (foraminifera) =

Cuneus Temporal range: mid Late Cretaceous to Paleocene

Scientific classification
- Domain: Eukaryota
- Clade: Sar
- Clade: Rhizaria
- Phylum: Retaria
- Subphylum: Foraminifera
- Class: Globothalamea
- Order: Rotaliida
- Family: Turrilinidae
- Genus: †Cuneus; Voloshina, 1974

Genus of foraminifers

Cuneus is a genus of Foraminifera in the Rotaliida found in Upper Cretaceous (Coniacian) to Paleocene marine sediments throughout the boreal regions.

The test is pyramidal in form, triserial throughout, with a triangular section, and may be slightly twisted. The test wall is calcareous, transparent. and finely perforate, the surface smooth. Sides are flat to slightly concave; sutures flush and oblique. The aperture is a narrow vertical loop on the apertural face of the final chamber.
