= Rosalina (foraminifera) =

Rosalina Temporal range: Eocene - Recent

Scientific classification
- Domain: Eukaryota
- Supergroup: Rhizaria
- Phylum: Foraminifera
- Class: Globothalamea
- Order: Rotaliida
- Family: Rosalinidae
- Genus: Rosalina d'Orbigny, 1826

Genus of foraminifers

Rosalina is a genus of foraminifera included in the rotaliid family Rosalinidae.

Rosalina has a smooth plano-convex to concavo-convex trochospiral test in which the chambers are rapidly enlarging and all visible on the convex spiral side and subtriangular and strongly overlapping on the umbilical side, the final chamber taking up about one-third of the circumference. Sutures on the spiral side are depressed and oblique, curving back at the periphery. The umbilicus is open, partly covered by triangular umbilical flaps extending from each chamber of the final whorl. Chamber interiors are simple and undivided with subacute peripheries. Walls are calcareous, with an organic inner lining, and are distinctly perforate. The aperture is a low interiomarginal arch near the periphery on the umbilical side, with narrow bordering lip.

Rosalina has a stratigraphic range from the Eocene to recent and a cosmopolitan distribution. Related genera include Neoconorbina, Rotorboides, and Semirosalina.
