= Stetsonia (foraminifera) =

Scientific classification
- Domain: Eukaryota
- Clade: Sar
- Clade: Rhizaria
- Phylum: Retaria
- Subphylum: Foraminifera
- Class: Globothalamea
- Order: Rotaliida
- Family: Pseudoparrellidae
- Subfamily: Stetsoniinae; Saidova, 1981
- Genus: Stetsonia; F.L. Parker, 1954

Species
- Stetsonia arctica Green, 1960; Stetsonia horvathi Green, 1959; Stetsonia micula McCulloch, 1977; Stetsonia minuta Parker, 1954; Stetsonia multiloculata McCulloch, 1977

Genus of single-celled organisms

Stetsonia is a genus of Foraminifera with five species.
