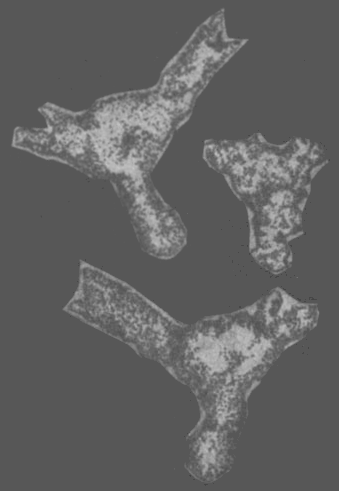
- Saccarena from the Ural Mountains.

Scientific classification
- Domain: Eukaryota
- Clade: Sar
- Clade: Rhizaria
- Phylum: Retaria
- Subphylum: Foraminifera
- Class: Monothalamea
- Order: Astrorhizida
- Family: Hippocrepinidae
- Genus: †Saccarena
- Species: †S. bitubulifera

Binomial name
- †Saccarena bitubulifera Chernykh (1969)

= Saccarena =

Saccarena Temporal range: Ludlow

Genus of foraminifera

Saccarena is a monotypic fossil genus of agglutinated benthic foraminifera described in 1969, belonging to the subfamily Saccorhizinae. It contains the sole species Saccarena bitubulifera. Its chronostratigraphic range is the Ludlovian, during the Upper Silurian.
