= Buccella (foraminifera) =

Buccella Temporal range: Oligocene to Holocene

Scientific classification
- Domain: Eukaryota
- Clade: Sar
- Clade: Rhizaria
- Phylum: Retaria
- Subphylum: Foraminifera
- Class: Globothalamea
- Order: Rotaliida
- Family: Notorotaliidae
- Genus: Buccella; Andersen, 1952

Genus of single-celled organisms

Buccella is a genus of late Cenozoic benthic foraminifera that made its first appearance during the Oligocene and is found living in recent oceans.

Buccella, named by Andersen, 1952, is assigned to the Trichohyalidae, a family making up part of the rotaliid superfamily Chilostomellacea. The test is planoconvex to lenticular, trochospiral, with three to four gradually enlarging whorls, seven to eight chambers in the final whorl. Sutures on the spiral side are thickened and curved back toward the periphery, those on the umbilical side radial and incised. The aperture is interiomarginal, midway between umbilicus and periphery, and may be partially covered by the umbilical granules. Test composition is calcareous.

Mesorotalia McCulloch, 1977, appears to be a junior synonym. Aubignyna, Neobuccella, and Trichohyalus are related genera.
