= Kalosha (foraminifera) =

Kalosha Temporal range: Early Pliocene - Recent

Scientific classification
- Domain: Eukaryota
- Clade: Sar
- Clade: Rhizaria
- Phylum: Retaria
- Subphylum: Foraminifera
- Class: Tubothalamea
- Order: Miliolida
- Family: Spiroloculinidae
- Genus: Kalosha; Boltovskoy, 1978

Genus of single-celled organisms

Kalosha is a genus of foraminifera included in the miliolid family Spiroloculinidae. Its test is small, ovate in outline, only up to 0.2 mm in the greatest dimension; begins with an oval proloculus followed by planispirally coiled elongate tubular chambers one-half coil in length, forming three to five whorls. The wall is calcareous, hyaline (glassy), and imperforate. The aperture is a narrow slit at the end of the final chamber.

Kalosha was named by Boltovskoy, the type species is Kalosha oceanica Boltovskoy, 1978. It has been found in Lower Pliocene sediments from the South Atlantic, Pacific, and Indian oceans.
