= Discorbis =

Discorbis Temporal range: Eocene - Recent

Scientific classification
- Domain: Eukaryota
- Clade: Sar
- Clade: Rhizaria
- Phylum: Retaria
- Subphylum: Foraminifera
- Class: Globothalamea
- Order: Rotaliida
- Family: Discorbidae
- Genus: Discorbis; Lamark, 1804

Genus of single-celled organisms

Discorbis is a genus of benthic Foraminifera (Kingdom Protista in paleontological classifications), that made its first appearance during the Eocene. Its present distribution is cosmopolitan.

Discorbis produces a smooth plano-convex to unequally biconvex trochospiral test (shell) with a flattened umbilical side, taking up about two and a half whorls, with seven to ten chambers in the final whorl. The test wall is calcareous, thin, optically radial, and finely to coarsely perforate. Sutures are depressed and curved to nearly radial. The umbilical region is covered by triangular flaps that extend from the umbilical margin of each chamber, forming a small chamberlet beneath. The aperture is a low, interiomarginal arch, outside the umbilicus.

The classification here is that of 1964, in the Treatise on Invertebrate Paleontology. As an alternative it may be included in the family Pegidiidae, which is elevated from the rotaliid subfamily Pegidiinae.
