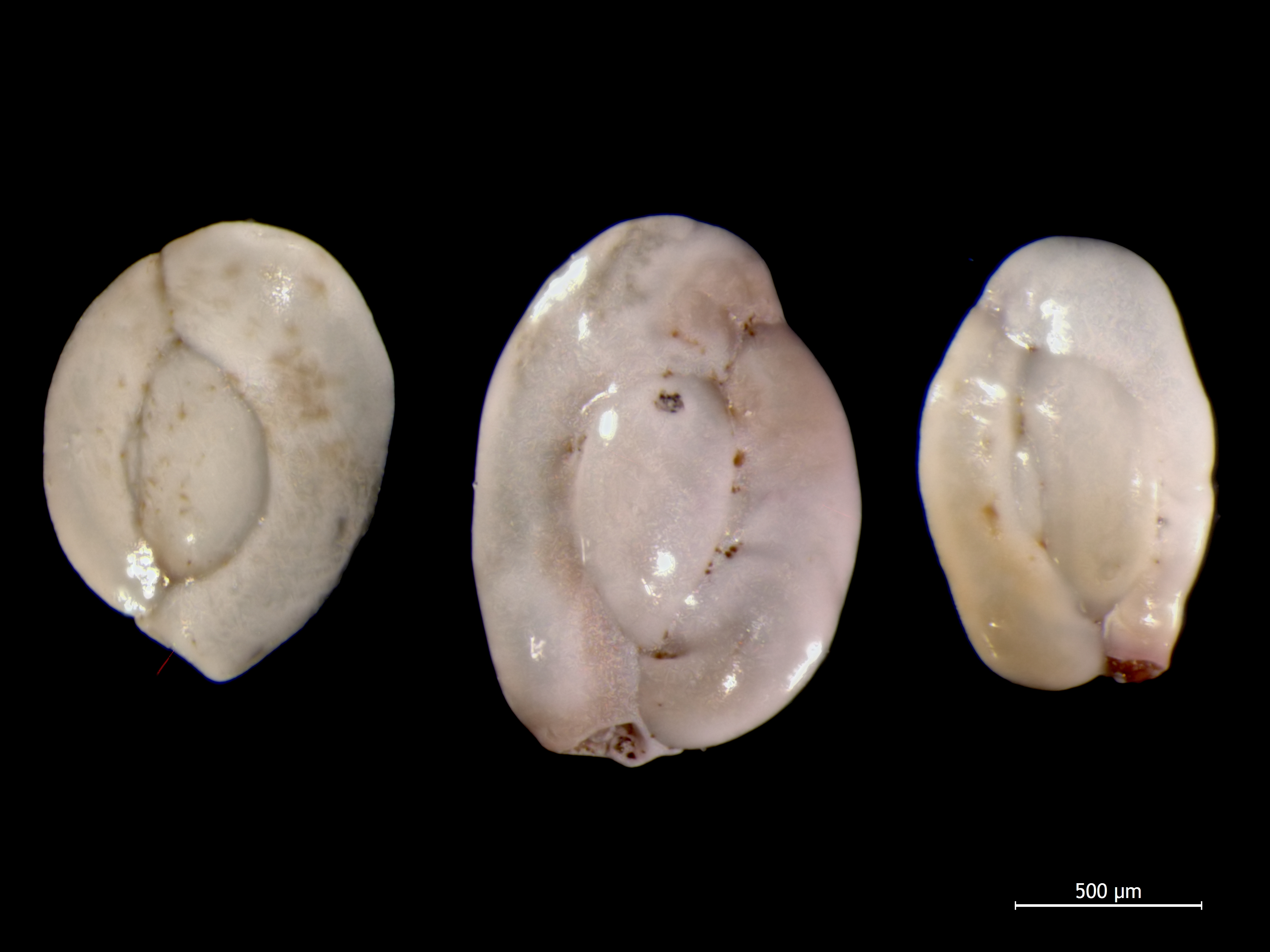
- Quinqueloculina seminula

Scientific classification
- Domain: Eukaryota
- Clade: Diaphoretickes
- Clade: Sar
- Clade: Rhizaria
- Phylum: Retaria
- Subphylum: Foraminifera
- Class: Tubothalamea
- Order: Miliolida
- Suborder: Miliolina
- Superfamily: Milioloidea
- Family: Hauerinidae; Schwager, 1876

Subfamilies
- See text

= Hauerinidae =

Hauerinidae Temporal range: Jurassic - Holocene

Family of single-celled organisms

Hauerinidae is a large and diverse family of miliolid forams (Loeblich & Tappan, 1988) that includes genera distributed among various subfamilies in the Treatise (Loelich &Tappan 1964) as well as genera named and described since.

== Diagnosis ==
Test with a proloculus commonly followed by tubular chambers, two per whorl added in one to five or more planes of coiling. Less commonly the adult test may have more than two chambers per whorl or may be uncoiled and rectilinear. The aperture may be a simple opening at the end of the final chamber, often with a tooth, or may be cribrate with multiple openings.

Six subfamilies are recognized (Loeblich & Tappan, 1988):

- Hauerininae
- Miliolinellinae
- Simoilinitinae
- Sigmoilopsinae
- Siphonoaptertinae
- Tubinellinae
