= Halenia legrandi =

Scientific classification
- Domain: Eukaryota
- Clade: Sar
- Clade: Rhizaria
- Phylum: Retaria
- Subphylum: Foraminifera
- Class: †Fusulinata
- Order: †Endothyrida
- Family: †Mstiniidae
- Genus: †Halenia; Conil, 1980
- Species: †H. legrandi

Binomial name
- †Halenia legrandi Conil, 1980

Extinct species of single-celled organism

Halenia is a genus of recent foraminifera. It contains only one species, Halenia legrandi The test is free, a low trochspire with a rounded periphery; wall calcareous, monolamellar. Chambers are subglobular, all visible on spiral side, only last volution visible on umbilical side; final chamber with an umbilical flap. Sutures are depressed, radial on umbilical side, curved to sinuate on spiral side, with sutural slits on both sides.
