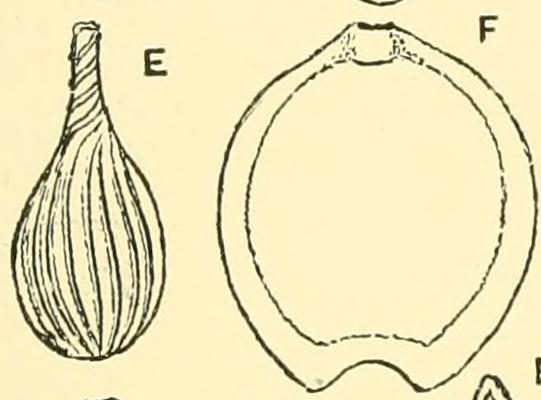
- Illustration of Lagena sulcata (E) and Lagena marginata (F)

Scientific classification
- Domain: Eukaryota
- Clade: Sar
- Clade: Rhizaria
- Phylum: Retaria
- Subphylum: Foraminifera
- Order: Lagenida
- Family: Lagenidae
- Genus: Lagena; Walker & Boys, 1784

Species
- More than 500

Synonyms
- Capitellina Marsson, 1878; Ectolagena A.Silvestri, 1900; Lagena (Capitellina) Franke, 1925 (subgenus); Lagenulina Terquem, 1876; Pygmaeoseistron Patterson & Richardson, 1987; Vermiculum Montagu, 1803

= Lagena (foraminifera) =

Genus of single-celled organisms

Lagena is a genus of benthic foraminifera of the family Lagenidae, the superfamily Nodosarioidea, the suborder Lagenina and the order Lagenida. Its type-species is Serpula (Lagena) sulcata . Its chronostratigraphic range spans from the Jurassic to the Present .
