= Nouria =

Nouria is a female given name. Notable people with this given name include:

- Nouria Benghabrit-Remaoun (born 1952), Algerian sociologist
- Nouria Hernandez, Swiss biologist
- Nouria Kazdarli (1921–2020), stage name of Algerian actress Khadidja Benaïda
- Nouria Mérah-Benida (born 1970), Algerian athlete
- Nouria Newman (born 1991), French slalom canoeist
- Nouria Salehi, Afghan-Australian nuclear physicist and humanitarian
- Nouria Yamina Zerhouni, Algerian politician
