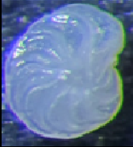
- Cibocidoides sp.

Scientific classification
- Domain: Eukaryota
- Clade: Sar
- Clade: Rhizaria
- Phylum: Foraminifera
- Class: Globothalamea
- Order: Rotaliida
- Family: Cibicididae
- Subfamily: Cibicidinae
- Genus: Cibicidoides; Thalmann, H. E., 1939.

Species
- Many, including: C. basilanensis; C. borealis; C cicatricosus (Schwager, 1866); C clarionensis

= Cibicidoides =

Cibicidoides Temporal range: Pg - Present

Genus of foraminifera

Cibicidoides is an extant genus of benthic foraminifera, with the oldest known species dating back to the Paleogene Period. (66 mya - 23 mya)

Like other benthic foraminifera, Cibicidoides are singled celled eucaryotic protists. They secrete a shell, or test, formed out of calcium carbonate (CaCO_{3}), which provides a durable source of protection compared to other protists.

Cibicidoides are structurally distinguished from other foraminifera by their segmented, spiral shaped tests. While Cibicidoides life span ranges from days to months depending on the species, all construct their segments in a clockwise order from the umbilical side (or counterclockwise order from the spinal side). This allows the age of an individual Cibicidoides to be determined based on the number segments present.

Cibicidoides tests are generally transparent/translucent in color, where well preserved, allowing the color of the single celled organic matter to partially show from inside the test. The color of a test is also a primary indicator as to whether or not a Cibicidoides is considered dead or alive, as the organic matter will decay rapidly after death, leaving only the empty translucent test behind.

== Use in paleoceanography ==
Due to the benthic nature of Cibicidoides (ie., since they live in ocean sediment), it is very common for the tests of deceased Cibicidoides to be pushed deep into the sediment as sedimentary accumulation occurs. This makes them excellent for use in Palaeoceanographic studies, as fossilized remains of Cibicidoides tests dating back millions of years can found in extracted sediment cores

A primary use for fossilized Cibicidoides tests comes in the determination of the stable-isotopes present, such as δ^{13}C. δ^{13}C can be used to track changes in the deep-water circulation, as collisions in different water masses can produce distinct changes in known percentages of δ^{13}C. Two water masses that exemplify this are the North Atlantic Deep Water and the Antarctic bottom water.

One problem that can affect the isotopic data of fossilized Cibicidoides is through their modification via a process known as diagenesis. Diagenesis encompasses a diverse range of alterations that can affect a material as it transitions from its original chemical composition to its fossilized state. With Cibicidoides, the alterations caused by diagenesis can bias the isotopic data of their tests. For example, calcite (a stable polymorph/crystalline structure of CaCO_{3}) can precipitate (i.e., come out of solution in a solid state) from the sediment fluid filling the pores of a foraminiferal test. This "new" calcite will show up in isotopic analysis of the test, but it may come from sediment that is geographically and temporarily unrelated to the original sample, thus meaning that it heavily biases the isotopic data of the Cibicidoides in question.

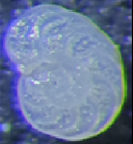
Cibocidoides sp. (Spinal side) with minimal fossilization

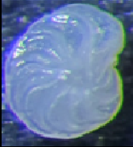
Cibocidoides sp. (umbilical side) with minimal fossilization

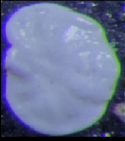
Cibocidoides sp. (spinal side) with total fossilization

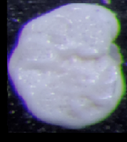
Cibocidoides sp. (umbilical side) with total fossilization

Cibocidoides sp. (spinal side) with partial fossilization

Cibocidoides sp. (umbilical side) with partial fossilization
