= Sorites (foraminifera) =

Sorites Temporal range: Miocene - Recent

Scientific classification
- Domain: Eukaryota
- Clade: Sar
- Clade: Rhizaria
- Phylum: Retaria
- Subphylum: Foraminifera
- Class: Tubothalamea
- Order: Miliolida
- Family: Soritidae
- Subfamily: Soritinae
- Genus: Sorites; Ehrenberg, 1839

Type species
- Nautilus orbiculus Forsskål, 1775

Species
- Sorites duplex Sorites grecoensis Sorites marginalis Sorites nayensis Sorites orbiculus Sorites variabilis

Genus of protists

Sorites is a genus of benthic Foraminifera, in the family Soritidae, order Miliolida. Its type species is Nautilus orbiculus (Forsskål in Niebuhr, 1775). Its chronostratigraphic range ranges from the Miocene to the present.

== Classification ==
Sorites includes the following species:

- Sorites duplex
- Sorites grecoensis (fossil only)
- Sorites marginalis
- Sorites nayensis
- Sorites orbiculus
- Sorites variabilis

Other species include:

- Sorites discoideus, accepted as Cycloputeolina discoidea
- Sorites hofkeri, accepted as Parasorites orbitolitoides
- Sorites orbitolitoides, accepted as Parasorites orbitolitoides
