= Nothia (foraminifera) =

Scientific classification
- Domain: Eukaryota
- Clade: Sar
- Clade: Rhizaria
- Phylum: Retaria
- Subphylum: Foraminifera
- Class: Monothalamea
- Order: Astrorhizida
- Family: Rhabdamminidae
- Subfamily: Bathysiphoninae
- Genus: †Nothia; Pflaumann (1964)

Type species
- Nothia grilli (Noth (1951))

Species
- Nothia excelsa; Nothia grilli; Nothia latissima; Nothia robusta; Nothia subalpina

Fossil genus of foraminifera

Nothia is an extinct genus of foraminifera described in 1964 by Pflaumann, belonging to the subfamily Bathysiphoninae and containing 5 species.
