= Concettina Buccella =

Italian power engineer

Concettina Buccella is an Italian power engineer whose research topics include "modeling of electrostatic precipitators, impact of electromagnetic fields, electromagnetic compatibility, composite materials, modeling of power converters, control and modulation techniques for power converters, renewable energy, smart grids, analytical and numerical modeling of electric systems". She is Professor in Power Converters, Electric Machines and Drives at the University of L'Aquila.

== Education and career ==
Buccella is originally from L'Aquila, and has a doctorate in electrotechnical engineering from the University of L'Aquila, earned in 1988. She completed a Ph.D. in electrical engineering in 1995 at Sapienza University of Rome.

She worked as an engineer for Italtel from 1988 to 1989. She returned to the university in 1990, became an assistant professor in electrotechnics in 1994, and was promoted to associate professor in 2002. She was given her current full professorship in 2020.

She is one of the founders of a 2007 spin-off company from the University of L'Aquila, DigiPower Ltd., and has served as CEO and Chief Scientific Officer of the company. She was the chair of the IEEE Industrial Electronics Society Renewable Energy Systems Technical Committee for 2017–2018.

== Recognition ==
In 2023, Buccella was elected as an IEEE Fellow "for contributions to the modeling of electric systems and the modulation of multilevel converters".
