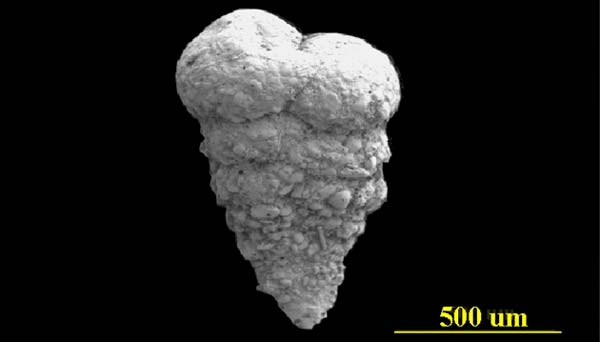
- Textularia shell

Scientific classification
- Domain: Eukaryota
- Clade: Sar
- Clade: Rhizaria
- Phylum: Retaria
- Subphylum: Foraminifera
- Class: Globothalamea
- Order: Textulariida

Superfamilies
- Ammodiscoidea; Astrorhizacea; Ataxophragmiacea; Hormosinoidea; Lituolacea; Orbitolinacea; Textulariacea; Trochamminacea

= Textulariida =

Textulariida Temporal range: Cambrian–Recent

Order of single-celled organisms

The Textulariida are an order of foraminifera that produce agglutinated shells or tests. An agglutinated test is one made of foreign particles glued together with an organic or calcareous cement to form an external shell on the outside of the organism. Commonly, the order had been made up of all species of Foraminifera with these types of shells, but genetic studies indicate these organisms do not form an evolutionary group, and several superfamilies in the order have been moved to the order Allogromiida. The remaining forms are sometimes divided into three orders: the Trochamminida and Lituolida, which have organic cement, and the Textulariida sensu stricto, which use a calcareous cement. All three orders or superfamilies are known as fossils from the Cambrian onwards.

== Taxonomy ==
If follow scheme of three orders, includes:

- Suborder: Trochamminina Saidova, 1981

- Superfamily: Trochamminoidea Schwager, 1877

- Adercotrymidae Brönnimann & Whittaker, 1987
- Remaneicidae Loeblich & Tappan, 1964
- Trochamminidae Schwager, 1877
