= Helen Niña Tappan Loeblich =

American micropaleontologist and academic (1917–2004)

- Born: October 12, 1917; Norman, Oklahoma, U.S.
- Died: August 18, 2004 (aged 86); Anaheim, California, U.S.
- Education: University of Oklahoma, University of Chicago
- Known for: fossil Foraminifera classification
- Spouse: Alfred R. Loeblich Jr.
- Scientific career
- Fields: Micropaleontology, biostratigraphy
- Workplaces: University of California, Los Angeles
- Doctoral advisor: Carey G. Croneis
- Doctoral students: Jere H. Lipps, Tim Patterson

Helen Niña Tappan Loeblich (October 12, 1917 – August 18, 2004) was an American micropaleontologist who was a professor of geology at the University of California, Los Angeles, a United States Geological Survey (USGS) biostratigrapher, and a scientific illustrator whose micropaleontology specialty was research on Cretaceous foraminifera.

She received a Guggenheim Fellowship award in 1953 and travelled to Europe to focus on her studies of foraminifera with her husband. She would also be awarded with multiple other titles and was recognized as the first woman professor in Tulane University.

== Early life ==
Helen Nina Tappan Leoblich was born on October 12, 1917, in Norman, Oklahoma on Columbus Day, which is why her middle name is Nina. Her mother Mary Pearl Jenks Tappan was a math teacher at Cornell, and her father, Frank Girard Tappan, was a Dean of Electrical Engineering at the University of Oklahoma.

== Education ==
Tappan Loeblich earned her Bachelor of Science in 1937 and her Master's in 1939, both in geology from the University of Oklahoma. She received the Sigma Gamma Epsilon Scholarship Award for Outstanding Senior in Geology. Her master's thesis was on mid-Cretaceous foraminifera of Oklahoma and Texas. At the University of Oklahoma, she met her future husband and long time scientific collaborator, Alfred R. Loeblich Jr, in chemistry class, in 1939. Shortly thereafter they married and spent their honeymoon doing field work with their graduate advisor, in the Arbuckle Mountains.

Leoblich received her Ph.D. in 1942 from the University of Chicago, and her dissertation continued her master's work. She intended to work for an oil company. When her husband was drafted in 1942, Tappan Loeblich became the first female professor at Tulane University's College of Arts and Sciences. After the war they moved to Washington DC and she continued her work with the United States Geological Survey (USGS) on the NabyOil Project in the naval petroleum reserve of the Alaskan North Slope. In 1953 she was forced to take a break from her work with USGS due to her husband’s new work assignment in Europe. She was awarded a Guggenheim Fellowship to support herself and her four children financially during her year in Europe. She and her husband collected foraminifera and later illustrated with a camera lucida the specimens they found. Over two tons of rock, from quarries and sites all over Europe, were shipped back to the US.

== Research ==
While working on the Treatise on Invertebrate Paleontology, Tappan Loeblich's research partner and husband Alfred was stationed in Europe by the Smithsonian Institution, in order to do further research on Foraminiferal samples seen in European museums, and those he collected in the field. Due to the USGS and their policy of not allowing work outside of the US, Tappan Loeblich took a leave of absence in order to join her husband in Europe. During their travels, the pair collected many samples, and greatly extended their knowledge on Foraminifera. Collecting more than two tons of rocks and examining the historical collections of foraminifera as well. This foraminifera as well as other types of specimens they studied were illustrated with a camera lucida and were used as backgrounds for Loeblich's work on the Treatise on Invertebrate Paleontology, volume on foraminifera.

Tappan Loeblich was known for her studies of Foraminifera, a single-celled organism that is capable of producing a shell called a test, usually made out of organic compounds, sand grains, and calcium carbonate depending on the species. The shells divide into chambers during growth, similar to the Ammonite. Foraminifera are useful in terms of biostratigraphy, as they show fairly significant evolutionally development, so different subspecies are found at different times.

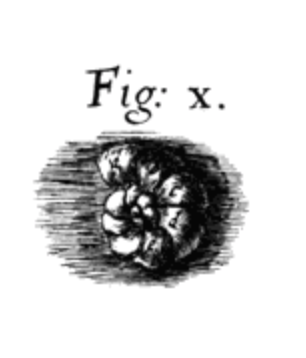
Illustration of a foraminifera shell, published by Robert Hooke.

Tappan Loeblich became the first female professor at Tulane University's College of arts and Science in 1942, where she was then awarded a Guggenheim fellowship in 1953 which allowed her a sabbatical from the USGS appointment and where she collected the sample of foraminifera with her husband Alfred Loeblich. Tappan Loeblich continued to work part time for the USGS and in 1958, became an honorary research associate of the Smithsonian institution, and moved to California to pursue a career with the University of California, where in 1966, she became a full-time faculty member, and then the vice chairman of geology from 1973 to 1975. Her husband Alfred began work on a micropaleontological program at Chevron Oil Field Research Company.

== Publications ==
Tappan Loeblich, in collaboration with her husband, made significant contributions to the field of paleontology by authoring and co-authoring multiple articles in the Journal of Paleontology. Among their noteworthy publications, the 1941 article titled "New Arenaceous Foraminifera from the Woodbine Sand of Northern Texas” stands out as a seminal work. This article provides a comprehensive analysis of a recently unearthed clay formation and the diverse array of species it contains.

In 1980 Tappan Loeblich published a book titled The Paleobiology of Plant Protists. The book discusses Loeblich's study of plant-like organisms known as Protists. The book delves into the fossil record of plant protists, with the book providing valuable insight into ancient environments, climate change, and the evolution of Earth through the fossilized remains of ancient protists.

The 1984 publication Suprageneric Classification of the Foraminiferida (Protozoa) refines the classification system Foraminiferida, by updating the analysis based on internal cellular structure and the influences they impact on their environment. The work was later refined by Tappan Loeblichs joint publication with her husband, Foraminiferal Genera and Their Classification.

== Awards ==
Tappan Loeblich received the Paleontological Society Medal in 1983, the Woman of the Year Award in Natural Science from the Palm Springs Desert Museum in 1987, the Raymond C. Moore Medal for “Excellence in Paleontology” in 1984, and the 1982 Woman of Science Award from the UCLA Medical Center Auxiliary.

Tappan Loeblich also worked on numerous editorial and society boards. She published a total of 272 scientific papers or books mainly with her husband. One of their most notable works was their 1957 paper “Correlation of the Gulf and Atlantic Coastal Plain Paleocene and lower Eocene formations by means of planktonic Foraminifera” which won the Best Paper Award in the Journal of Paleontology. Her book, “The Paleobiology of Plant Protists” (1980), was also voted “the best non-fiction book” for that year.

== Contributions to science ==
Tappan Loeblich became an essential figure in the paleontology community. She mentored numerous students during the time she spent teaching at UCLA. She also worked on numerous editorial and society boards.

Tappan Loeblich is also known for her books, landmark papers, articles and her scientific output, both as a sole author and collaborator. She and her husband published 272 scientific papers in their lifetimes. In 1957, they won the Best Paper Award in the Journal of Paleontology after submitting their article "Correlation of the Gulf and Atlantic Coastal Plain Paleocene and Lower Eocene formations by means of planktonic Foraminifera." She also won the Award of the Association of American Publishers for the best professional and scholarly book in the field of Geography and Earth Science, which she won in 1988 after publishing their two-volume book Foraminiferal Genera and Their Classification in 1987.

== Personal life ==
Helen and Alfred did research in tandem for over 55 years despite the fact that they were completely the opposite. He was extravagant, resilient and candid while Helen was quiet and disciplined.

Their home was full of equipment for paleontology purposes. Tappan Loeblich was also an artist and created all the illustrations for their scientific texts and articles, bookplates for the library. She could also sew and made clothes and costumes for herself and her children. She also made doll clothes and animal hand puppets.

Tappan Loeblich excelled at cooking and cake decorating, often sharing her food with her neighbors. She and her husband wrote a cookbook of their favorite recipes in 1988. Other than those activities she also had the ability to brick patios, tiled her kitchen, hang wallpapers, build fishponds, made electrical repairs, planted trees and was involved in the Association of American Publishers Gardens.

After going through the Great Depression, Helen was always prudent. She kept the record of their expenses. Her family was never debt, she even also got into investment which helped her save up for the retirement and tuition fees of her children.

== Later life and death ==
Most of Loeblich's achievements were accomplished alongside her husband. They had four children including Karen Elizabeth Loeblich, Judith Anne Loeblich Covey, Daryl Lousie Loeblich, and finally, Alfred Richard Leoblich III, who took a doctorate in botany at the Scripps Institution of Oceanography.

Both Tappan Loeblich and her husband toured different countries including Europe, Eastern Europe, China, and Japan upon many government and university requests. When her husband was diagnosed with Alzheimer's, she retired early from UCLA in 1984 to care for her husband for him. He died of Alzheimer’s in 1994.

Loeblich developed a stroke a year after her husband’s death. She was admitted to the hospital on August 15, what would have been her husband’s 90th birthday, and died three days later August 18, 2004 in California at age 86.
