= Alfred R. Loeblich Jr =

American paleontologist (1914–1994)

- Born: August 15, 1914; Birmingham, Alabama, U.S.
- Died: September 9, 1994 (aged 80)
- Education: University of Oklahoma; University of Chicago
- Occupation: Micropaleontologist
- Spouse: Helen Niña Tappan (m. 1939)

Alfred R. Loeblich Jr (August 15, 1914 – September 9, 1994) was an American micropaleontologist. He was married to Helen Niña Tappan Loeblich and the two co-authored a number of important works on the Foraminifera and related organisms.

== Biography ==
Alfred R. Loeblich Jr was born in Birmingham, Alabama, on August 15, 1914, and spent his early life in Kansas City, Missouri. He attended the University of Oklahoma and there met Helen Tappan, and they were married in June 1939. After completing his doctorate at the University of Chicago, Loeblich took up a post at Tulane University in New Orleans. Their first child, Alfred R. Loeblich III (who later took a Ph.D. in botany at Scripps Institute), was born in 1941 and married Laurel Ann Loeblich, a botanist also.

Loeblich joined the Army during World War II, becoming captain in the U.S. Army Field Artillery. After the war he worked as a curator in invertebrate paleontology at the United States Museum (Smithsonian Institution) in Washington, D.C., and was sponsored by the Smithsonian to study foraminifera in European collections. In 1957 he went to work for the Chevron oil company, and later became adjunct professor at UCLA. Loeblich and Tappan were jointly awarded the Paleontological Society Medal in 1982, and the same year they received the Joseph A. Cushman Award for Excellence in Foraminiferal Research. In 1984 Loeblich was made an Honorary Member of the SEPM (Society for Sedimentary Geology). In 1987 the AASG (Association of American State Geologists) awarded him the Raymond C. Moore Medal for Excellence in Paleontology. Loeblich was a Fellow of the Geological Society of America, and was described after his death as "one of the giants [of] micropaleontology." He died on September 9, 1994.

== Publications ==
Among the works written by Loeblich and Tappan were:

- Studies of Arctic Foraminifera (1953)
- The part of Treatise on Invertebrate Paleontology (1964) concerned with foraminifera, described in a 1965 review as "a monumental work which will serve as the standard reference for foraminiferologists for decades to come".
- Foraminiferal genera and their classification (1988)
- Upwards of 45 journal articles, published in Journal of Paleontology, Micropaleontology and elsewhere.
