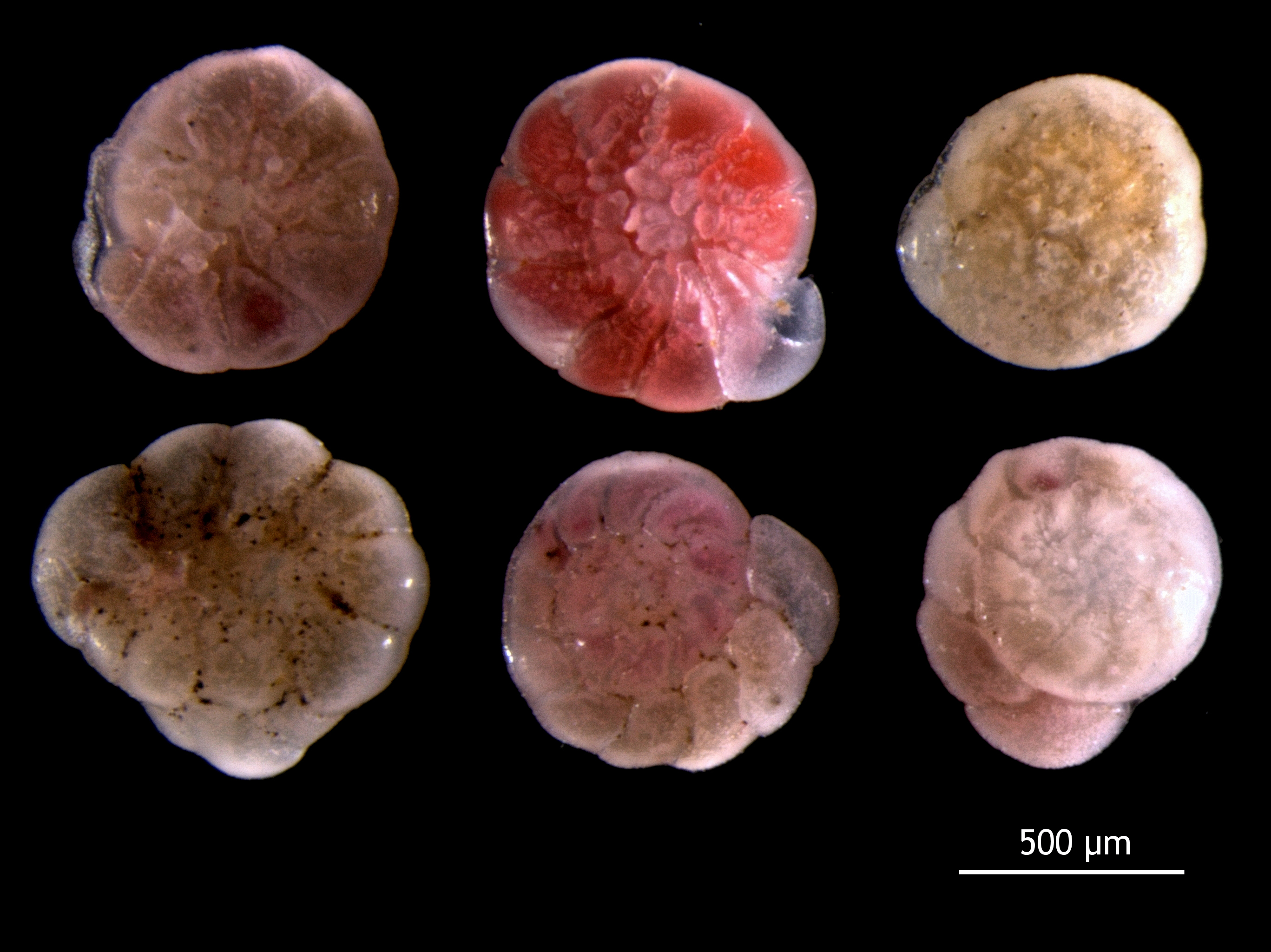
- Ammonia beccarii

Scientific classification
- Domain: Eukaryota
- Clade: Sar
- Clade: Rhizaria
- Phylum: Retaria
- Subphylum: Foraminifera
- Class: Globothalamea; Pawlowski, Holzmann, & Tyszka, 2013

Orders
- Textulariia; Lituolida; Loftusiida; Textulariida; Carterinida; Robertinida; Rotaliida; †Fusulinida

= Globothalamea =

Globothalamea Temporal range: Devonian? - Recent

Class of single-celled organisms

Globothalamea comprises a class of multichambered foraminifera based in part on SSU rDNA evidence; the other is Tubothalamea.

Six orders are included, which vary notably in composition, wall structure, and chamber arrangement. The Lituolida, Loftusiida, and Textulariida (as emended) have tests (shells) of agglutinated matter, glued together by various cements, but differ in chamber arrangement, wall structure, and complexity. In contrast the Carterinida, Robertinida and Rotaliida, with buliminids lumped into the Rotaliida, have calcareous tests. Those of rotaliid genera, which vary considerably, are of perforate hyaline (glassy) calcite. in contrast the Carterinida have tests composed of bundled calcite spicules. The Robertida differ in being composed, instead, of aragonite.

Subclass Textulariia

- Orders: Lituolida – Loftusiida – Textulariida

Unassigned

- Orders: Carterinida – Robertinida – Rotaliida
