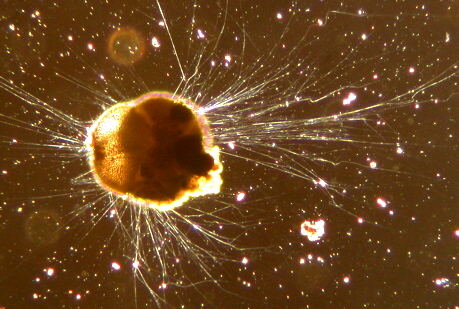
- Live Ammonia tepida

Scientific classification
- Domain: Eukaryota
- Clade: Sar
- Clade: Rhizaria
- Clade: Retaria; Cavalier-Smith 1999

Phyla
- Foraminifera; Radiolaria

Synonyms
- Ectoreta Cavalier-Smith 2018

= Retaria =

Clade of single-celled organisms

Retaria is a clade within the supergroup Rhizaria containing the Foraminifera and the Radiolaria. In 2019, the Retaria were recognized as a basal Rhizaria group, as sister of the Cercozoa.

- SAR
  - Rhizaria
    - Cercozoa
    - Retaria
      - - Foraminifera
        - Polycystinea
      - Acantharea
  - Halvaria
    - Stramenopiles
    - Alveolata

== Taxonomy ==
In 2018, Cavalier-Smith called this group Ectoreta and grouped it with Endomyxa and called this new grouping Retaria instead. Cavalier-Smith et al., 2018 proposed to exclude Sticholonchea from Radiozoa and proposed this scheme instead:

- Phylum Retaria
  - Subphylum Endomyxa
    - Superclass Marimyxia
    - Superclass Proteomyxia
  - Subphylum Ectoreta
    - Infraphylum Foraminifera
    - Infraphylum Radiozoa
    - Infraphylum Sticholonchia

Exclusion of Endomyxa from Cercozoa was challenged in 2019. Retaria is generally divided into two phyla Foraminifera and Radiolaria.
