= Protists in the fossil record =

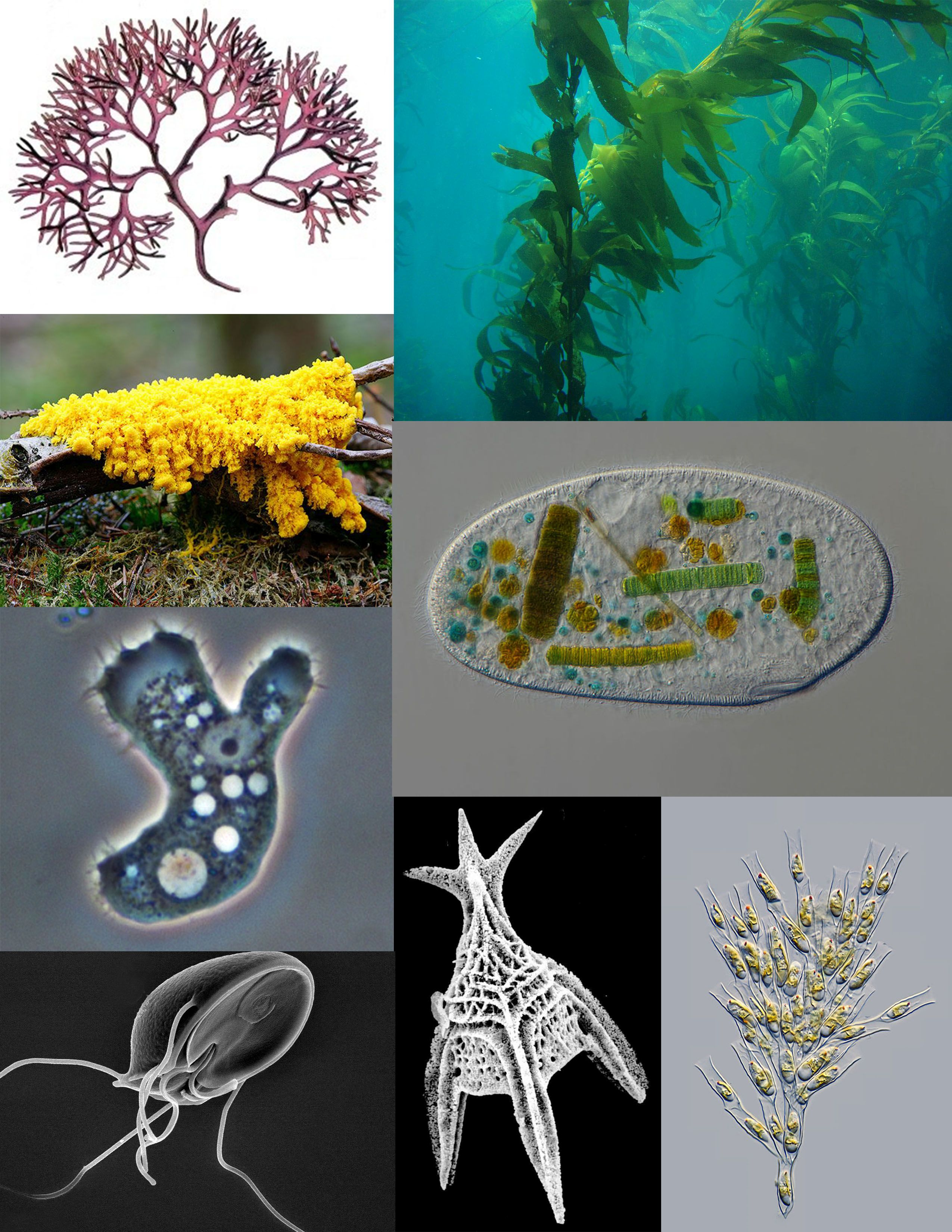
Diversity of protists

A protist is any eukaryotic organism (that is, an organism whose cells contain a cell nucleus) that is not an animal, plant, or fungus. While it is likely that protists share a common ancestor, the last eukaryotic common ancestor, the exclusion of other eukaryotes means that protists do not form a natural group, or clade. (Note: The first eukaryotes were "neither plants, animals, nor fungi", hence as defined, protists would include the last eukaryotic common ancestor.) Therefore, some protists may be more closely related to animals, plants, or fungi than they are to other protists. However, like algae, invertebrates and protozoans, the grouping is used for convenience.

Many protists have neither hard parts nor resistant spores, and their fossils are extremely rare or unknown. Examples of such groups include the apicomplexans, most ciliates, some green algae (the Klebsormidiales), choanoflagellates, oomycetes, brown algae, yellow-green algae, Excavata (e.g., euglenids). Some of these have been found preserved in amber (fossilized tree resin) or under unusual conditions (e.g., Paleoleishmania, a kinetoplastid).

Others are relatively common in the fossil record, as the diatoms, golden algae, haptophytes (coccoliths), silicoflagellates, tintinnids (ciliates), dinoflagellates, green algae, red algae, heliozoans, radiolarians, foraminiferans, ebriids and testate amoebae (euglyphids, arcellaceans). Some are used as paleoecological indicators to reconstruct ancient environments.

More probable eukaryote fossils begin to appear at about 1.8 billion years ago, the acritarchs, spherical fossils of likely algal protists. Another possible representative of early fossil eukaryotes are the Gabonionta.

== Modern classifications ==
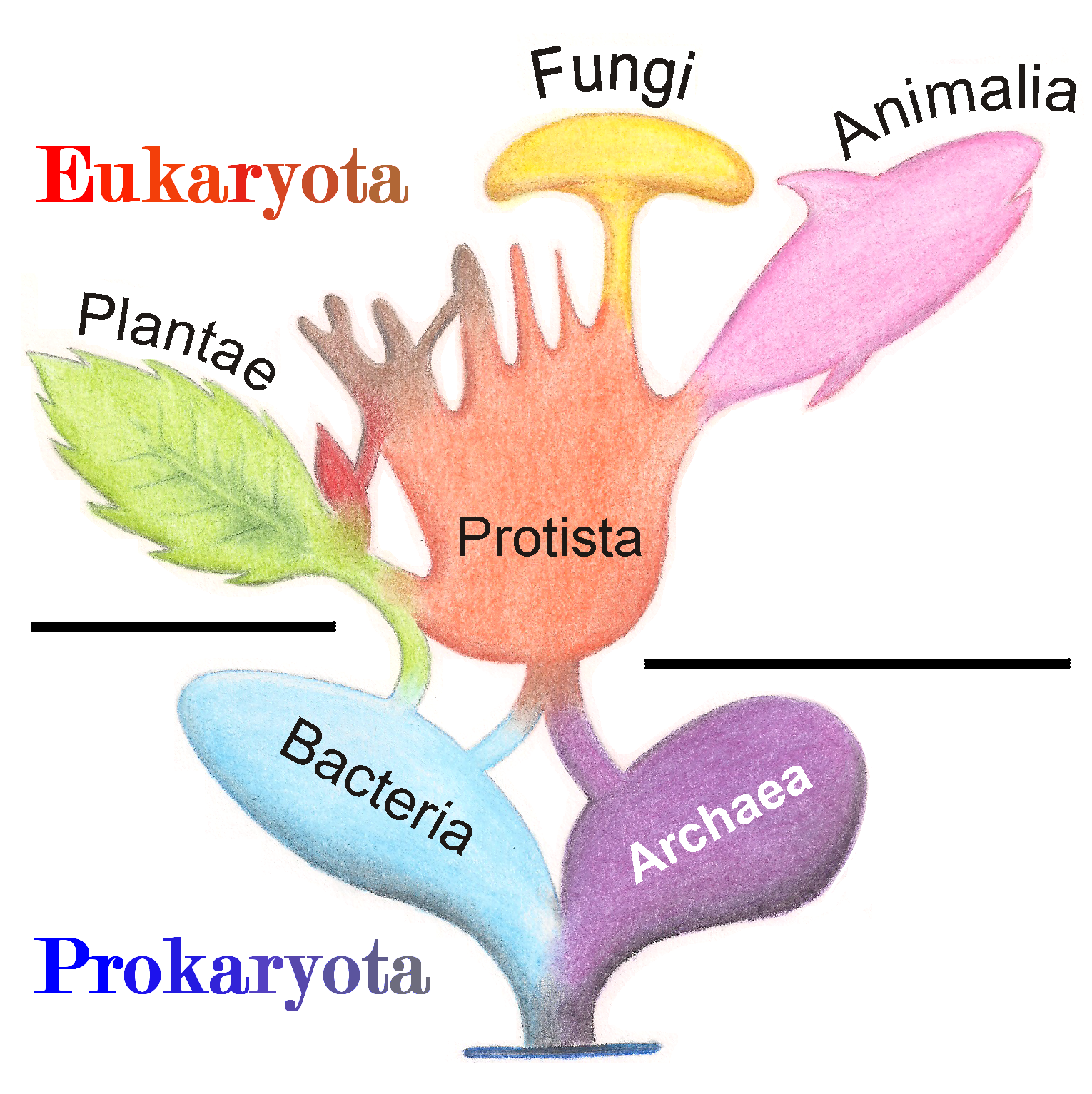
Phylogenetic and symbiogenetic tree of living organisms, showing the origins of eukaryotes

Systematists today do not treat Protista as a formal taxon, but the term "protist" is still commonly used for convenience in two ways. The most popular contemporary definition is a phylogenetic one, that identifies a paraphyletic group: a protist is any eukaryote that is not an animal, (land) plant, or (true) fungus; this definition excludes many unicellular groups, like the Microsporidia (fungi), many Chytridiomycetes (fungi), and yeasts (fungi), and also a non-unicellular group included in Protista in the past, the Myxozoa (animal).

The other definition describes protists primarily by functional or biological criteria: protists are essentially those eukaryotes that are never multicellular, that either exist as independent cells, or if they occur in colonies, do not show differentiation into tissues (but vegetative cell differentiation may occur restricted to sexual reproduction, alternate vegetative morphology, and quiescent or resistant stages, such as cysts); this definition excludes many brown, multicellular red and green algae, which may have tissues.

The taxonomy of protists is still changing. Newer classifications attempt to present monophyletic groups based on morphological (especially ultrastructural), biochemical (chemotaxonomy) and DNA sequence (molecular research) information. However, there are sometimes discordances between molecular and morphological investigations; these can be categorized as two types: (i) one morphology, multiple lineages (e.g. morphological convergence, cryptic species) and (ii) one lineage, multiple morphologies (e.g. phenotypic plasticity, multiple life-cycle stages).

Because the protists as a whole are paraphyletic, new systems often split up or abandon the kingdom, instead treating the protist groups as separate lines of eukaryotes. The recent scheme by Adl et al. (2005) does not recognize formal ranks (phylum, class, etc.) and instead treats groups as clades of phylogenetically related organisms. This is intended to make the classification more stable in the long term and easier to update. Some of the main groups of protists, which may be treated as phyla, are listed in the taxobox, upper right. Many are thought to be monophyletic, though there is still uncertainty. For instance, the Excavata are probably not monophyletic and the chromalveolates are probably only monophyletic if the haptophytes and cryptomonads are excluded.

== Archaeplastida ==
(in part)

=== Red algae ===
One of the oldest fossils identified as a red alga is also the oldest fossil eukaryote that belongs to a specific modern taxon. Bangiomorpha pubescens, a multicellular fossil from arctic Canada, strongly resembles the modern red alga Bangia and occurs in rocks dating to 1.05 billion years ago.

Two kinds of fossils resembling red algae were found sometime between 2006 and 2011 in well-preserved sedimentary rocks in Chitrakoot, central India. The presumed red algae lie embedded in fossil mats of cyanobacteria, called stromatolites, in 1.6 billion-year-old Indian phosphorite – making them the oldest plant-like fossils ever found by about 400 million years.

Red algae are important builders of limestone reefs. The earliest such coralline algae, the solenopores, are known from the Cambrian period. Other algae of different origins filled a similar role in the late Paleozoic, and in more recent reefs.

Calcite crusts that have been interpreted as the remains of coralline red algae, date to the Ediacaran Period. Thallophytes resembling coralline red algae are known from the late Proterozoic Doushantuo formation.

== SAR supergroup ==
=== Stramenopiles ===
==== Brown algae ====
The occurrence of Phaeophyceae as fossils is rare due to their generally soft-bodied nature, and scientists continue to debate the identification of some finds. Part of the problem with identification lies in the convergent evolution of morphologies between many brown and red algae. Most fossils of soft-tissue algae preserve only a flattened outline, without the microscopic features that permit the major groups of multicellular algae to be reliably distinguished. Among the brown algae, only species of the genus Padina deposit significant quantities of minerals in or around their cell walls. Other algal groups, such as the red algae and green algae, have a number of calcareous members. Because of this, they are more likely to leave evidence in the fossil record than the soft bodies of most brown algae and more often can be precisely classified.

Fossils comparable in morphology to brown algae are known from strata as old as the Upper Ordovician, but the taxonomic affinity of these impression fossils is far from certain. Claims that earlier Ediacaran fossils are brown algae have since been dismissed. While many carbonaceous fossils have been described from the Precambrian, they are typically preserved as flattened outlines or fragments measuring only millimeters long. Because these fossils lack features diagnostic for identification at even the highest level, they are assigned to fossil form taxa according to their shape and other gross morphological features. A number of Devonian fossils termed fucoids, from their resemblance in outline to species in the genus Fucus, have proven to be inorganic rather than true fossils. The Devonian megafossil Prototaxites, which consists of masses of filaments grouped into trunk-like axes, has been considered a possible brown alga. However, modern research favors reinterpretation of this fossil as a terrestrial fungus or fungal-like organism. Likewise, the fossil Protosalvinia was once considered a possible brown alga, but is now thought to be an early land plant.

A number of Paleozoic fossils have been tentatively classified with the brown algae, although most have also been compared to known red algae species. Phascolophyllaphycus possesses numerous elongate, inflated blades attached to a stipe. It is the most abundant of algal fossils found in a collection made from Carboniferous strata in Illinois. Each hollow blade bears up to eight pneumatocysts at its base, and the stipes appear to have been hollow and inflated as well. This combination of characteristics is similar to certain modern genera in the order Laminariales (kelps). Several fossils of Drydenia and a single specimen of Hungerfordia from the Upper Devonian of New York have also been compared to both brown and red algae. Fossils of Drydenia consist of an elliptical blade attached to a branching filamentous holdfast, not unlike some species of Laminaria, Porphyra, or Gigartina. The single known specimen of Hungerfordia branches dichotomously into lobes and resembles genera like Chondrus and Fucus or Dictyota.

The earliest known fossils that can be assigned reliably to the Phaeophyceae come from Miocene diatomite deposits of the Monterey Formation in California. Several soft-bodied brown macroalgae, such as Julescraneia, have been found.

==== Diatoms ====
Heterokont chloroplasts appear to derive from those of red algae, rather than directly from prokaryotes as occurred in plants. This suggests they had a more recent origin than many other algae. However, fossil evidence is scant, and only with the evolution of the diatoms themselves do the heterokonts make a serious impression on the fossil record.

The earliest known fossil diatoms date from the early Jurassic (~185 Ma ago), although the molecular clock and sedimentary evidence suggests an earlier origin. It has been suggested that their origin may be related to the end-Permian mass extinction (~250 Ma), after which many marine niches were opened. The gap between this event and the time that fossil diatoms first appear may indicate a period when diatoms were unsilicified and their evolution was cryptic. Since the advent of silicification, diatoms have made a significant impression on the fossil record, with major fossil deposits found as far back as the early Cretaceous, and with some rocks such as diatomaceous earth, being composed almost entirely of them.

Although diatoms may have existed since the Triassic, the timing of their ascendancy and "take-over" of the silicon cycle occurred more recently. Prior to the Phanerozoic (before 544 Ma), it is believed that microbial or inorganic processes weakly regulated the ocean's silicon cycle. Subsequently, the cycle appears dominated (and more strongly regulated) by the radiolarians and siliceous sponges, the former as zooplankton, the latter as sedentary filter-feeders primarily on the continental shelves. Within the last 100 My, it is thought that the silicon cycle has come under even tighter control, and that this derives from the ecological ascendancy of the diatoms.

However, the precise timing of the "take-over" remains unclear, and different authors have conflicting interpretations of the fossil record. Some evidence, such as the displacement of siliceous sponges from the shelves, suggests that this takeover began in the Cretaceous (146 Ma to 66 Ma), while evidence from radiolarians suggests "take-over" did not begin until the Cenozoic (66 Ma to present).

The expansion of grassland biomes and the evolutionary radiation of grasses during the Miocene is believed to have increased the flux of soluble silicon to the oceans, and it has been argued that this promoted the diatoms during the Cenozoic era. Recent work suggests that diatom success is decoupled from the evolution of grasses, although both diatom and grassland diversity increased strongly from the middle Miocene.

Diatom diversity over the Cenozoic has been very sensitive to global temperature, particularly to the equator-pole temperature gradient. Warmer oceans, particularly warmer polar regions, have in the past been shown to have had substantially lower diatom diversity. Future warm oceans with enhanced polar warming, as projected in global-warming scenarios, could thus in theory result in a significant loss of diatom diversity, although from current knowledge it is impossible to say if this would occur rapidly or only over many tens of thousands of years.

The fossil record of diatoms has largely been established through the recovery of their siliceous frustules in marine and non-marine sediments. Although diatoms have both a marine and non-marine stratigraphic record, diatom biostratigraphy, which is based on time-constrained evolutionary originations and extinctions of unique taxa, is only well developed and widely applicable in marine systems. The duration of diatom species ranges have been documented through the study of ocean cores and rock sequences exposed on land. Where diatom biozones are well established and calibrated to the geomagnetic polarity time scale (e.g., Southern Ocean, North Pacific, eastern equatorial Pacific), diatom-based age estimates may be resolved to within <100,000 years, although typical age resolution for Cenozoic diatom assemblages is several hundred thousand years.

Diatoms preserved in lake sediments are widely used for paleoenvironmental reconstructions of Quaternary climate, especially for closed-basin lakes which experience fluctuations in water depth and salinity.

The Cretaceous record of diatoms is limited, but recent studies reveal a progressive diversification of diatom types. The Cretaceous–Paleogene extinction event, which in the oceans dramatically affected organisms with calcareous skeletons, appears to have had relatively little impact on diatom evolution.

Although no mass extinctions of marine diatoms have been observed during the Cenozoic, times of relatively rapid evolutionary turnover in marine diatom species assemblages occurred near the Paleocene–Eocene boundary, and at the Eocene–Oligocene boundary. Further turnover of assemblages took place at various times between the middle Miocene and late Pliocene, in response to progressive cooling of polar regions and the development of more endemic diatom assemblages.

A global trend toward more delicate diatom frustules has been noted from the Oligocene to the Quaternary. This coincides with an increasingly more vigorous circulation of the ocean's surface and deep waters brought about by increasing latitudinal thermal gradients at the onset of major ice sheet expansion on Antarctica and progressive cooling through the Neogene and Quaternary towards a bipolar glaciated world. This caused diatoms to take in less silica for the formation of their frustules. Increased mixing of the oceans renews silica and other nutrients necessary for diatom growth in surface waters, especially in regions of coastal and oceanic upwelling.

=== Alveolata ===
==== Dinoflagellata ====
Dinoflagellates are mainly represented as fossils by fossil dinocysts, which have a long geological record with lowest occurrences during the mid-Triassic, whilst geochemical markers suggest a presence to the Early Cambrian.

Some evidence indicates dinosteroids in many Paleozoic and Precambrian rocks might be the product of ancestral dinoflagellates (protodinoflagellates).

Molecular phylogenetics show that dinoflagellates are grouped with ciliates and apicomplexans (=Sporozoa) in a well-supported clade, the alveolates. The closest relatives to dinokaryotic dinoflagellates appear to be apicomplexans, Perkinsus, Parvilucifera, syndinians, and Oxyrrhis. Molecular phylogenies are similar to phylogenies based on morphology.

The earliest stages of dinoflagellate evolution appear to be dominated by parasitic lineages, such as perkinsids and syndinians (e.g. Amoebophrya and Hematodinium).

All dinoflagellates contain red algal plastids or remnant (nonphotosynthetic) organelles of red algal origin. The parasitic dinoflagellate Hematodinium however lacks a plastid entirely. Some groups that have lost the photosynthetic properties of their original red algae plastids has obtained new photosynthetic plastids (chloroplasts) through so-called serial endosymbiosis, both secondary and tertiary. Like their original plastids, the new chloroplasts in these groups can be traced back to red algae, except from those in the members of the genus Lepidodinium, which possess plastids derived from green algae, possibly Trebouxiophyceae or Ulvophyceae. Lineages with tertiary endosymbiosis are Dinophysis, with plastids from a cryptomonad, the Karenia, Karlodinium, and Takayama, which possess plastids of haptophyte origin, and the Peridiniaceae, Durinskia and Kryptoperidinium, which has plastids derived from diatoms Some species also perform kleptoplasty.

Dinoflagellate evolution has been summarized into five principal organizational types: prorocentroid, dinophysoid, gonyaulacoid, peridinioid, and gymnodinoid. The transitions of marine species into fresh water have been infrequent events during the diversification of dinoflagellates and in most cases have not occurred recently, possibly as late as the Cretaceous.

Recently, the "living fossil" Dapsilidinium pastielsii was found inhabiting the Indo-Pacific Warm Pool, which served as a refugium for thermophilic dinoflagellates.

=== Rhizaria ===
==== Foraminifera ====
Molecular clocks indicate that the crown-group of foraminifera likely evolved during the Neoproterozoic, between 900 and 650 million years ago; this timing is consistent with Neoproterozoic fossils of the closely related filose amoebae. As fossils of foraminifera have not been found prior to the very end of the Ediacaran, it is likely that most of these Proterozoic forms did not have hard-shelled tests.

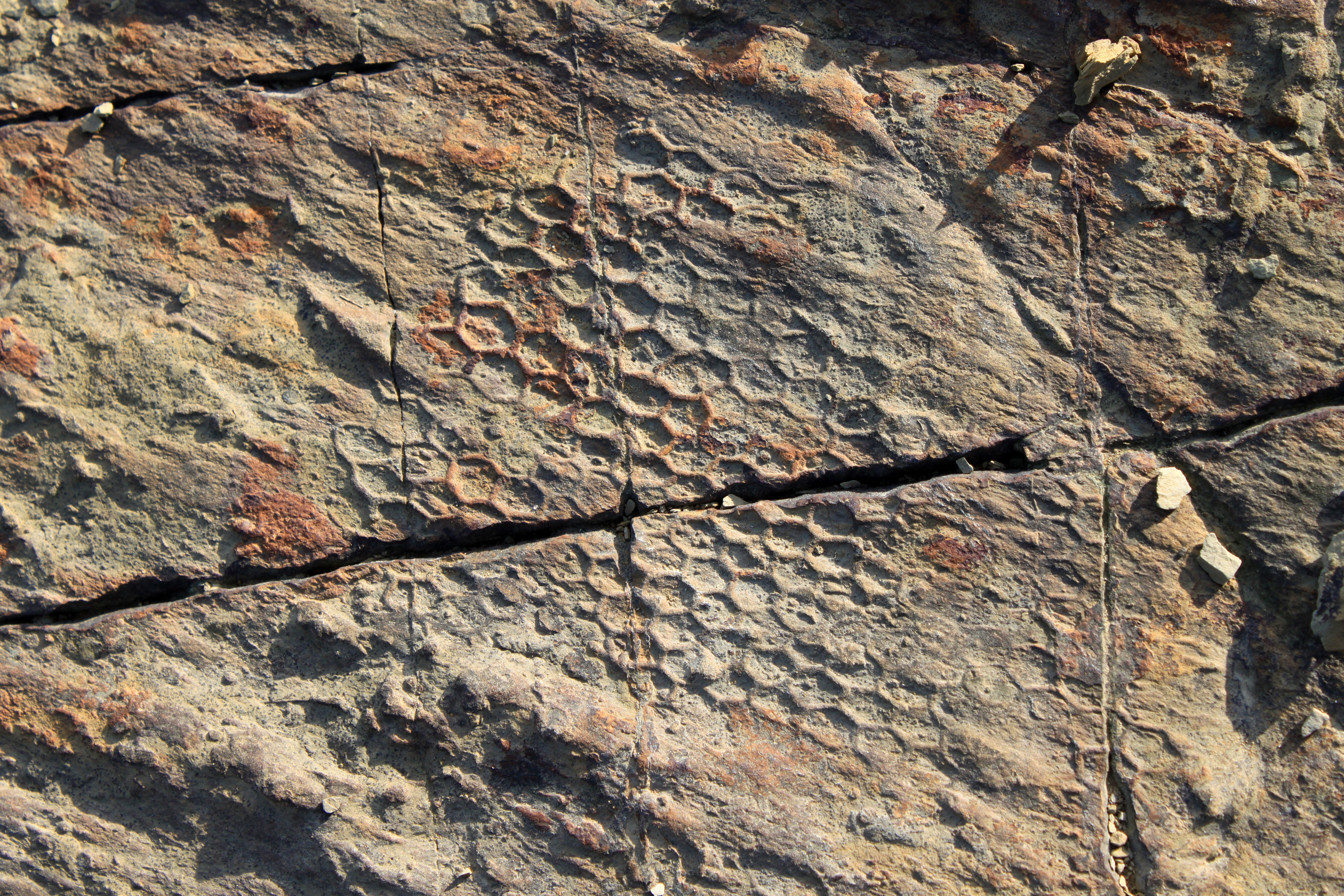
The mysterious Paleodictyon has been interpreted as a fossil xenophyophore but this remains controversial.

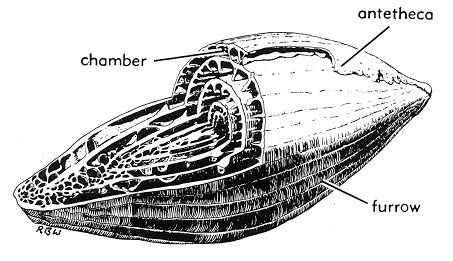
Cutaway view of a Fusulinid

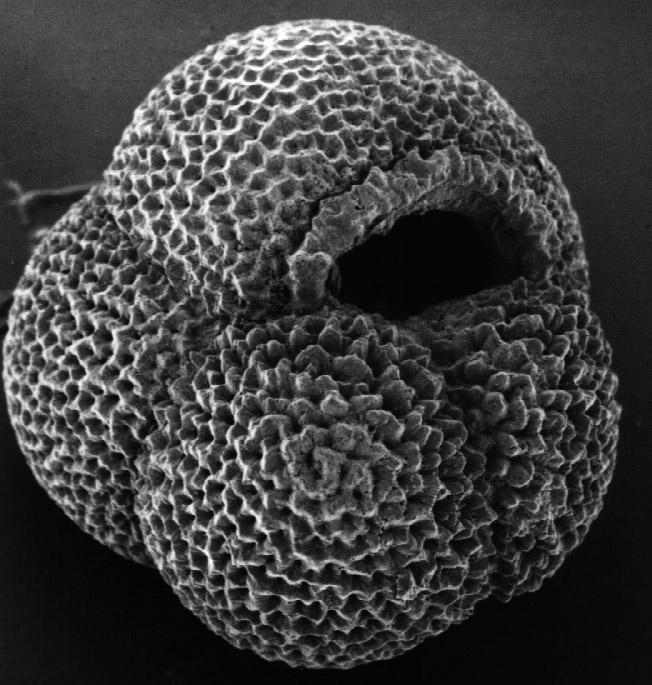
A fossil test from a planktonic globigerininan foraminifera

Due to their non-mineralised tests, "allogromiids" have no fossil record. The mysterious Vendobionta of the Ediacaran period have been suggested to represent fossil xenophyophores. However, the discovery of diagenetically altered C_{27} sterols associated with the remains of Dickinsonia cast doubt on this identification and suggest it may instead be an animal. Other researchers have suggested that the elusive trace fossil Paleodictyon and its relatives may represent a fossil xenophyophore and noted the similarity of the extant xenophyophore Occultammina to the fossil; however, modern examples of Paleodictyon have not been able to clear up the issue and the trace may alternately represent a burrow or a glass sponge. Supporting this notion is the similar habitat of living xenophyophores to the inferred habitat of fossil graphoglyptids; however, the large size and regularity of many graphoglyptids as well as the apparent absence of xenophyae in their fossils casts doubt on the possibility. As of 2017 no definite xenophyophore fossils have been found.

Test-bearing foraminifera have an excellent fossil record throughout the Phanerozoic eon. The earliest known definite foraminifera appear in the fossil record towards the very end of the Ediacaran; these forms all have agglutinated tests and are unilocular. These include forms like Platysolenites and Spirosolenites.

Single-chambered foraminifera continued to diversity throughout the Cambrian. Some commonly encountered forms include Ammodiscus, Glomospira, Psammosphera, and Turritellella; these species are all agglutinated. They make up part of the Ammodiscina, a lineage of spirillinids that still contains modern forms. Later spirillinids would evolve multilocularity and calcitic tests, with the first such forms appearing during the Triassic; the group saw little effects on diversity due to the K-Pg extinction.

The earliest multi-chambered foraminifera are agglutinated species, and appear in the fossil record during the middle Cambrian period. Due to their poor preservation they cannot be positively assigned to any major foram group. The earliest known calcareous-walled foraminifera are the Fusulinids, which appear in the fossil record during the Llandoverian epoch of the early Silurian. The earliest of these were microscopic, planispirally coiled, and evolute; later forms evolved a diversity of shapes including lenticular, globular, and elongated rice-shaped forms. Later species of fusulinids grew to much larger size, with some forms reaching 5 cm in length; reportedly, some specimens reach up to 14 cm in length, making them among the largest foraminifera extant or extinct. Fusulinids are the earliest lineage of foraminifera thought to have evolved symbiosis with photosynthetic organisms. Fossils of fusulinids have been found on all continents except Antarctica; they reached their greatest diversity during the Visean epoch of the Carboniferous. The group then gradually declined in diversity until finally going extinct during the Permo-Triassic extinction event.

During the Tournaisian epoch of the Carboniferous, Miliolid foraminifera first appeared in the fossil record, having diverged from the spirillinids within the Tubothalamea. Miliolids suffered about 50% casualties during both the Permo-Triassic and K-Pg extinctions but survived to the present day. Some fossil miliolids reached up to 2 cm in diameter. The earliest known Lagenid fossils appear during the Moscovian epoch of the Carboniferous. Seeing little effect due to the Permo-Triassic or K-Pg extinctions, the group diversified through time. Secondarily unilocular taxa evolved during the Jurassic and Cretaceous.

The earliest Involutinid fossils appear during the Permian; the lineage diversified throughout the Mesozoic of Eurasia before apparently vanishing from the fossil record following the Cenomanian-Turonian Ocean Anoxic Event. The extant group planispirillinidae has been referred to the involutinida, but this remains the subject of debate.

The Robertinida first appear in the fossil record during the Anisian epoch of the Triassic. The group remained at low diversity throughout its fossil history; all living representatives belong to the Robertinidae, which first appeared during the Paleocene.

The first definite Rotaliid fossils do not appear in the fossil record until the Pliensbachian epoch of the Jurassic, following the Triassic-Jurassic event. Diversity of the group remained low until the aftermath of the Cenomanian-Turonian event, after which the group saw a rapid diversification. Of this group, the planktonic Globigerinina—the first known group of planktonic forams—first appears in the aftermath of the Toarcian Turnover; the group saw heavy losses during both the K-Pg extinction and the Eocene-Oligocene extinction, but remains extant and diverse to this day. An additional evolution of planktonic lifestyle occurred in the Miocene or Pliocene, when the rotaliid Neogallitellia independently evolved a planktonic lifestyle.

==== Radiolaria ====
Fossil radiolarian

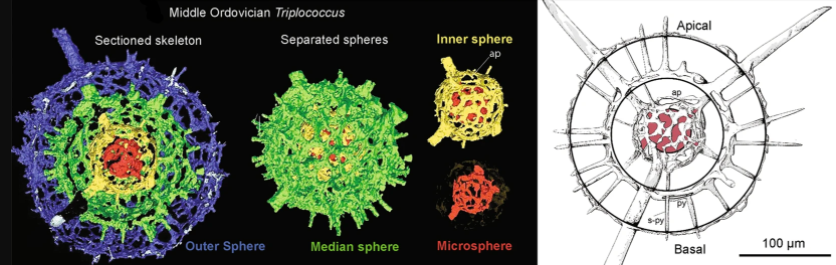
X-ray microtomography of Triplococcus acanthicus
This is a microfossil from the Middle Ordovician with four nested spheres. The innermost sphere is highlighted red. Each segment is shown at the same scale.

The earliest known radiolaria date to the very start of the Cambrian period, appearing in the same beds as the first small shelly fauna—they may even be terminal Precambrian in age. They have significant differences from later radiolaria, with a different silica lattice structure and few, if any, spikes on the test. Ninety percent of radiolarian species are extinct. The skeletons, or tests, of ancient radiolarians are used in geological dating, including for oil exploration and determination of ancient climates.

Some common radiolarian fossils include Actinomma, Heliosphaera and Hexadoridium.

== Excavata ==
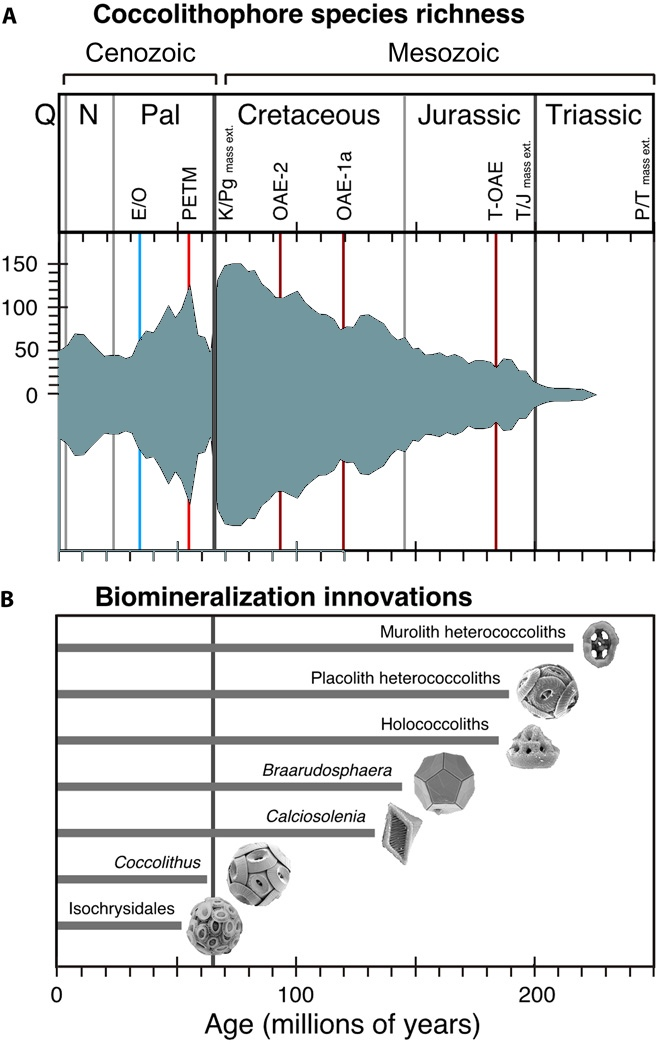
Evolutionary history of coccolithophores (A) Coccolithophore species richness over time (B) The fossil record of major coccolithophore biomineralization innovations and morphogroups

=== Metamonada ===
==== Hacrobia ====
- Coccolithophores: The diagram on the right shows —>

(A) coccolithophore species richness over time combining heterococcoliths and nannoliths. Q, Quaternary; N, Neogene; Pal, Paleogene; E/O, Eocene/Oligocene glacial onset event; PETM, Paleocene/Eocene thermal maximum warming event; K/Pg, Cretaceous/Paleogene; OAE, oceanic anoxic event; T-OAE, Toarcian oceanic anoxic event; T/J, Triassic/Jurassic; P/T, Permian/Triassic; mass ext., mass extinction.

(B) the fossil record of major coccolithophore biomineralization innovations and morphogroups, including the first appearances of muroliths (simple coccoliths with narrow, wall-like rims), placoliths (coccoliths with broad shields that interlock to form strong coccospheres), holococcoliths (coccoliths formed from microcrystals in the haploid life cycle phase), Braarudosphaera (pentagonal, laminated nannoliths forming dodecahedral coccospheres); Calciosolenia (distinct, rhombic murolith coccoliths), Coccolithus (long-ranging and abundant Cenozoic genus), Isochrysidales (dominant order that includes Emiliania, Gephyrocapsa, and Reticulofenestra). Significant mass extinctions and paleoceanographic/paleoclimatic events are marked as horizontal lines.

==== Opisthokonta ====
(in part)

== (reclassified) ==
=== Golden algae ===
Because many of these organisms had a silica capsule, they have a relatively complete fossil record, allowing modern biologists to confirm that they are, in fact, not derived from cyanobacteria, but rather an ancestor that did not possess the capability to photosynthesize. Many of the chrysophyta precursor fossils entirely lacked any type of photosynthesis-capable pigment. Most biologists believe that the chrysophytes obtained their ability to photosynthesize from an endosymbiotic relationship with fucoxanthin-containing cyanobacteria.

=== Green algae ===
Green algae is hypothesised to have evolved from a flagellate ancestor.

== See also ==
- Marine sediment
- Microfossils
- Protist shells
  - List of prehistoric foraminifera genera
