= Komokiacea =

Scientific classification
- Domain: Eukaryota
- Clade: Sar
- Clade: Rhizaria
- Phylum: Retaria
- Subphylum: Foraminifera
- Class: Monothalamea
- Order: Allogromiida
- Superfamily: Komokiacea; Tendal & Hessler 1977

Families
- Komokiidae; Baculellidae

Superfamily of single-celled organisms

The Komokiacea are a small group of amoeboid protozoa, considered to be foraminifera, though there have been suggestions that they are a separate group, closely related to foraminifera. Komokiacea are rather large organisms, often exceeding 300 micrometers in maximum dimensions. Along with Xenophyophores they dominate the macro- and megabenthic fauna in the deep sea and are commonly referred to as "giants protists".

The komokiacean body consists of a central tube with several branching tubules that contain diffuse protoplasm and numerous waste pellets (stercomata). They often incorporate fine grain material between the tubules. However, in other forms such as that of the genus Lana the body is a loose mass of branching tubules with no centre of organization. Komokiacea serve often as a substrate for benthic meiofaunal organisms such as foraminifera, fungi and other deep-sea taxa. They are fragile and often get fragmented during analysis in the laboratory, which leads to a large number of tube fragments difficult to identify. They are commonly abundant in oligotrophic areas and, like other soft-walled foramiferal taxa, they become increasingly important with depth, especially below the carbonate compensation depth. In terms of diversity approximately 40 species have been described worldwide. High numbers of morphospecies have been described from the Southern Ocean (50), and the North-east subequatorial Pacific (102), which suggests that they are a significant constituent of benthic foraminiferal diversity in the deep sea.
