= Conicotheca nigrans =

Scientific classification
- Domain: Eukaryota
- (unranked): SAR
- (unranked): Rhizaria
- Superphylum: Retaria
- Phylum: Foraminifera
- Order: Allogromiida
- Family: Allogromida incertae sedis
- Genus: Conicotheca
- Species: C. nigrans

Binomial name
- Conicotheca nigrans Gooday, Todo, Uematsu & Kitazato, 2008

Species of single-celled organism

Conicotheca nigrans is a species of benthic Foraminifera that was first identified from samples collected from the Challenger Deep in the Mariana Trench. C. nigrans has a test or outer shell of agglutinated organic materials and minerals. As a species belonging to a basal clade of foraminifera, the order Allogromiida, C. nigrans may be informative about the evolution of the forams.
