= Ammodiscus =

Ammodiscus Temporal range: Silurian - Present

Scientific classification
- Domain: Eukaryota
- Clade: Sar
- Clade: Rhizaria
- Phylum: Retaria
- Subphylum: Foraminifera
- Class: Tubothalamea
- Order: Spirillinida
- Family: Ammodiscidae
- Subfamily: Ammodiscinae
- Genus: Ammodiscus; Reuss, 1862

Genus of foraminifera

Ammodiscus is a genus in the family Ammodiscidae of textulariid foraminifera. Ammodiscus species are vagile, epibenthic foraminiferans, usually found in seawater with normal salinity.
