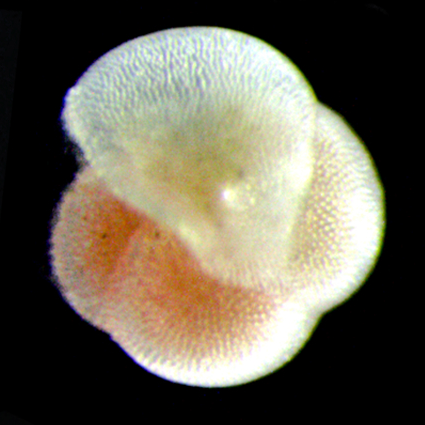
- Photomicrograph of a live specimen from oceanic samples

Scientific classification
- Domain: Eukaryota
- Clade: Sar
- Clade: Rhizaria
- Phylum: Foraminifera
- Class: Globothalamea
- Order: Rotaliida
- Family: Globorotaliidae
- Genus: Pulleniatina
- Species: P. obliquiloculata

Binomial name
- Pulleniatina obliquiloculata (Parker & Jones, 1865)

= Pulleniatina obliquiloculata =

Planktonic foraminifera

Pulleniatina obliquiloculata is a planktonic foraminifera, one of the two extant species for the genus Pulleniatina, first occurrence within N19 zone (or PL1, C3n. 1r). Widely tropical-subtropical marine mixoplankton, pelagic inhabitants of deep waters (lower mesopelagic to upper bathypelagic environment).

== Taxonomy ==
This species first described in 1862 by Parker and Jones, named as Pullenia obliquiloculata. Brady in 1884 first changed the name to Pulleniatina obliquiloculata. Parker and Jones in 1967 divided Pulleniatina obliquiloculata in to three subspecies: P. obliquiloculata obliquiloculata, P. obliquiloculata praecursor and P. obliquiloculata finalis. Later Reach supported those subspecies as species, Pulleniatina obliquiloculata obliquiloculata nowadays named Pulleniatina obliquiloculata.

P. obliquiloculata used to be under the Globorotaliinae as a subfamily which belongs to Globigerinidae, now Globorotaliinae is separated into an independent family Globorotaliidae.

== Evolution ==
Phylogenetic tree base on morphology and fossil records shows that Pulleniatina evolved two lineages separated at Late Miocene (N17 zone), extant species are the obliquiloculata lineage, P. obliquiloculata separated from P. praecursor at Early- middle Pliocene. The closest relationship species with Pulleniatina is Neogloboquadrina acostaensis or Globorotalia (Turborotalia) acostaensis.

P. obloqulioculata also classified as nonspinose macroperforate, but a publication by Burt and Scott in 1975, suggested that P. obloqulioculata is spinose in the early of its ontogeny. Phylogenetic tree base on small sub-unit ribosomal DNA (SSU rDNA) shows that P. obliquiloculata has closely relationship with Neogloboquadrina. Somehow, there is a reach shows that P. obliquiloculata can separate into two clades, the phylogenetic relationship with these two clades are so separated, maybe there were some P. finalis misidentification as P. obliquiloculata. The genetic relationship of those modern macroperforates are not clear. So far, knowledge about these organisms is very limited.

== Geological event ==
There some coiling direction transition event happens after Pulleniatina differentiation, the cause and detailed mechanism are unknown, but it can still be used to assist in the judgment of geological age.

P. obliquiloculata basically right coiling, but Pulleniatina species on the originally are left coiling species, also the extinct Pulleniatina lineage Pulleniatina praespectabilis– spectabilis lineage actually left coiling. One of the famous transition event is left-coiling episode 9 or L9. Those kinds of transition have no evidence for cause by climate.

Geological record shows Pulleniatina disappearance from the Atlantic Ocean in the Late Pliocene calls Atlantic Ocean disappearance. At the middle of Pleistocene there was Atlantic Ocean reappearance for Pulleniatina.

== Ecology ==
Base on the nitrogen isotopic composition between two amino acids (glutamic acid and phenylalanine), the result shoes that P. obliquiloculata is omnivorous with herbivorous dependence, food source maybe contents more phytoplankton than zooplankton.

P. obliquiloculata has ability to sexual reproduction, reproductive cycles have characterized by lunar periodicity, also seasonal changes, the peak breeding period is approximately from autumn to spring, around each full moon.

P. obliquiloculata calcification has strong positive correlation with temperature, ocean warming may increase P. obliquiloculata calcification.
