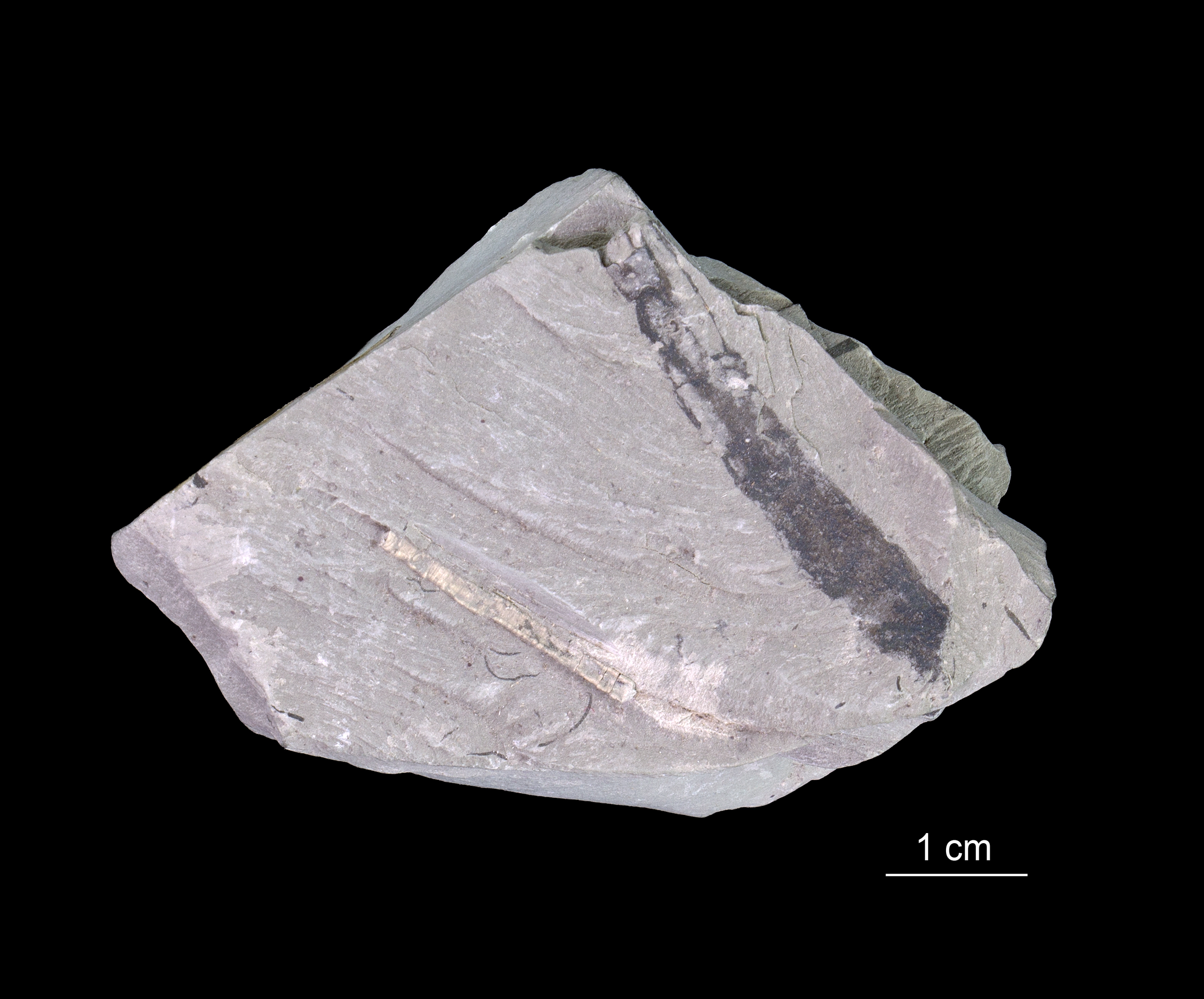
- Platysolenites antiquissimus

Scientific classification
- Domain: Eukaryota
- Clade: Sar
- Clade: Rhizaria
- Phylum: Retaria
- Subphylum: Foraminifera
- Class: Monothalamea
- Order: Astrorhizida
- Family: Hyperamminidae
- Subfamily: Hyperammininae
- Genus: †Platysolenites; Pander in Eichwald, 1854

Species
- Platysolenites antiquissimus Eichwald, 1860; Platysolenites cooperi McIlroy, Green & Brasier, 2001

= Platysolenites =

Genus of single-celled organisms

Platysolenites is a genus of agglutinated foraminifera known from Ediacaran and lower Cambrian assemblages.
