= Robertinida =

Robertinida Temporal range: Middle Triassic–recent

Scientific classification
- Domain: Eukaryota
- Clade: Diaphoretickes
- Clade: SAR
- Clade: Rhizaria
- Phylum: Retaria
- Subphylum: Foraminifera
- Class: Globothalamea
- Order: Robertinida; Loeblich & Tappan, 1984

Superfamilies
- Robertinacea; Ceratobuliminacea; Conorboidacea; Duostominacea

Order of single-celled organisms

The Robertinida are an order of Middle Triassic to recent, benthic foraminifera in which tests are planispirally to trochospirally coiled, with chambers provided with an internal partition and hyaline perforated walls composed of optically radiated aragonite.
