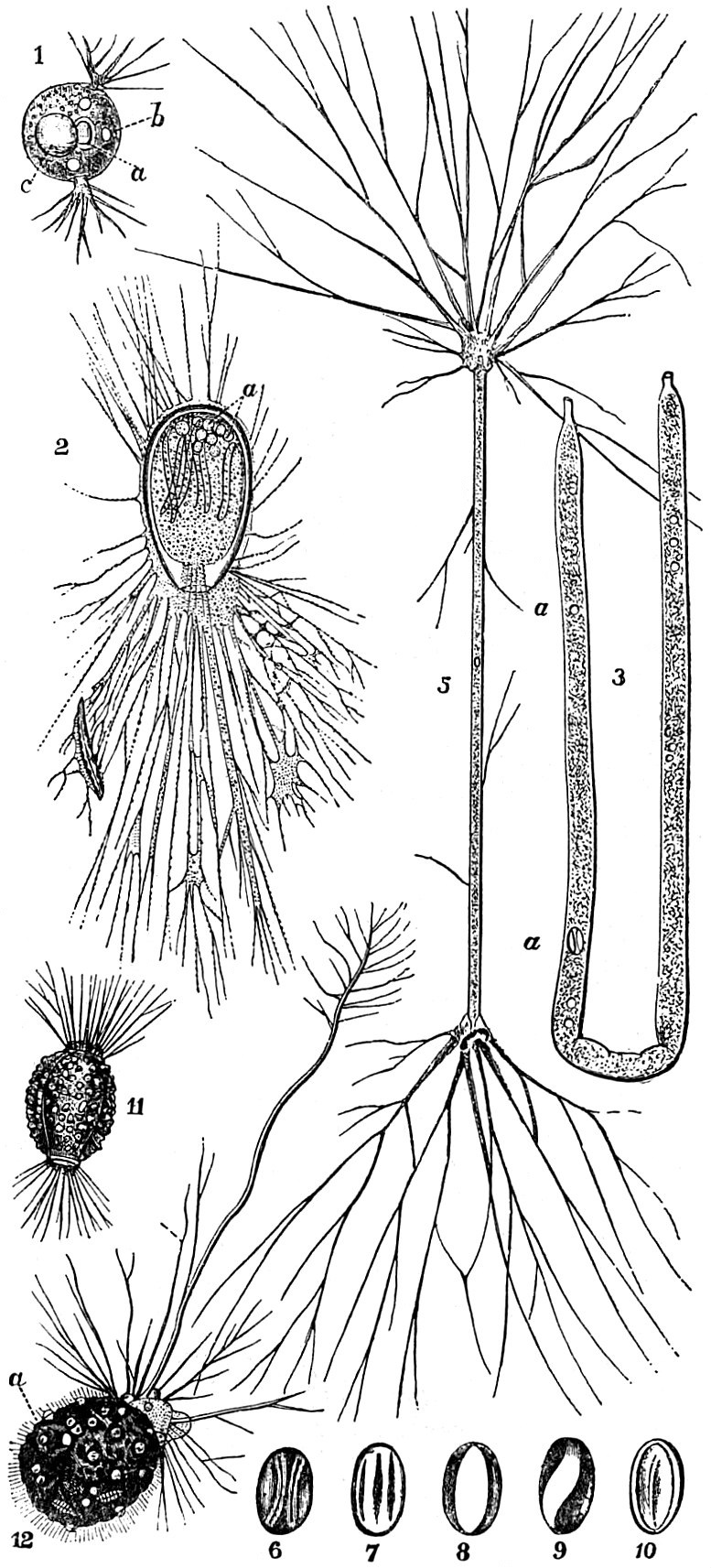

Scientific classification
- Domain: Eukaryota
- Clade: Sar
- Clade: Rhizaria
- Phylum: Retaria
- Subphylum: Foraminifera
- Class: Monothalamea
- Order: Allogromiida; Loeblich & Tappan, 1961

Superfamilies
- Allogromida incertae sedis Ammodiscoidea; Astrorhizacea; Hippocrepinacea; Lagynacea; Komokiacea

= Allogromiida =

Allogromiida Temporal range: Early Cambrian - Recent

Order of single-celled organisms

Allogromiida is an order of single-chambered, mostly organic-walled foraminiferans, including some that produce agglutinated tests (Lagynacea). Genetic studies indicate that some foraminiferans with agglutinated tests, previously included in the Textulariida or as their own order Astrorhizida, may also belong here. Allogromiids produce relatively simple tests, usually with a single chamber, similar to those of other protists such as Gromia. They are found as both marine and freshwater forms, and are the oldest forms known from the fossil record.

== Genus ==
- Allogromia
