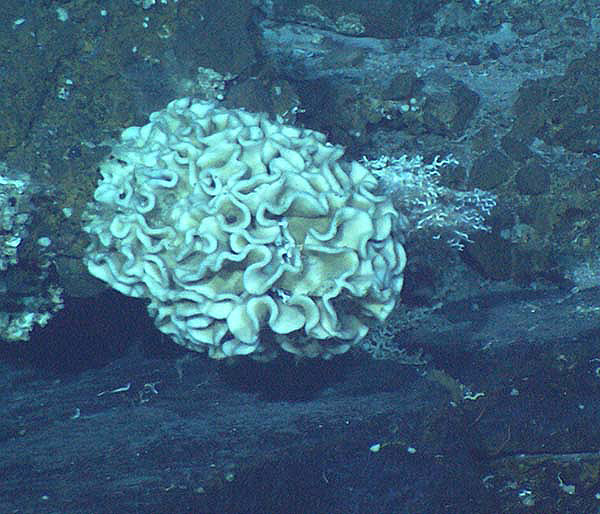
- Image of a deep sea xenophyophore

Scientific classification
- Domain: Eukaryota
- Clade: Sar
- Clade: Rhizaria
- Phylum: Retaria
- Subphylum: Foraminifera
- Class: Monothalamea; Haeckel, 1862, emend. Pawlowski et al., 2013

Orders and subtaxa incertae sedis
- "Allogromiida"; "Astrorhizida"; Xenophyophorea Tendal, 1972; Reticulomyxa Page, 1987, emend. Huelsmann, 2014; Genera incertae sedis; Flexammina Voltski & Pawlowski, 2015; Leannia Apothéloz-Perret-Gentil & Pawlowski, 2014; Nellya Gooday, Anikeeva, & Pawlowski, 2010

= Monothalamea =

Taxonomic group of foraminifera

Monothalamea is a grouping of foraminiferans, single celled organisms, traditionally consisting of all foraminifera with single-chambered tests, or external shell. Recent work has shown that the grouping is paraphyletic, and as such does not constitute a natural group; nonetheless, the name monothalamea continues to be used by foraminifera workers out of convenience.

== Classification ==
"Monothalamea" traditionally contains two groups, neither of which is currently considered to be monophyletic:

- "Allogromiida" traditionally consists of all foraminifera which lack a mineralised test, instead having a test of tectin. Recent work has shown that this grouping is paraphyletic.
- "Astrorhizida" traditionally consists of all foraminifera with single-chambered, agglutinated tests. Recent work has shown that this grouping is polyphyletic, as agglutinated tests have evolved from proteinaceous tests multiple times throughout foraminiferal evolution.

Recent molecular evidence has revealed that the deep-sea xenophyophores are in fact agglutinated, single-chambered foraminifera. Molecular evidence has also revealed that the freshwater protist Reticulomyxa is in fact a naked, testless foraminifera, and as such it has been included with monothalameans in scientific discussion.

A 2013 molecular study using small subunit rDNA concluded that known monothalameans made up at least 22 distinct living clades from marine environments with an additional four clades from freshwater eDNA.
