= Ammodiscidae =

Scientific classification
- Domain: Eukaryota
- Clade: Sar
- Clade: Rhizaria
- Phylum: Retaria
- Subphylum: Foraminifera
- Class: Tubothalamea
- Order: Spirillinida
- Suborder: Ammodiscina; Mikhalevich, 1980
- Superfamily: Ammodiscoidea; Reuss, 1862
- Family: Ammodiscidae; Reuss, 1862

Subfamilies
- Ammodiscinae Reuss, 1862; Ammovertellininae Saidova, 1981; Tolypammininae Cushman, 1928; Usbekistaniinae Vyalov, 1968

Family of foraminifera

Ammodiscidae is a family of foraminifera in the order Spirillinida. It was described by August Emanuel von Reuss in 1862. Ammodiscidae is the sole member of the monotypic superfamily Ammodiscoidea, which in turn is the sole member of the monotypic suborder Ammodiscina.
