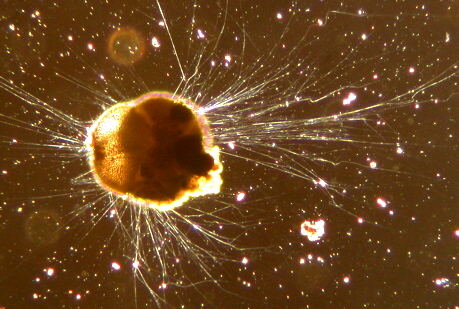
- Live Ammonia tepida (Rotaliida)

Scientific classification
- Domain: Eukaryota
- Supergroup: Rhizaria
- Clade: Retaria
- Phylum: Foraminifera d'Orbigny 1826

Subdivisions
- "Monothalamea": "Allogromiida"; "Astrorhizida"; Xenophyophorea; Reticulomyxa; Tubothalamea: Miliolida; Spirillinida; Globothalamea: Textulariida; Rotaliida; Globigerinida; Carterinida; Robertinida; Fusulinida? – extinct; incertae sedis: Involutinida; Lagenida

= Foraminifera =

Foraminifera Temporal range: 542–0 Ma Latest Ediacaran–Recent

Phylum of amoeboid protists

Foraminifera (/fəˌræməˈnɪfərə/ fə-RAM-ə-NIH-fə-rə; Latin for "hole bearers"; informally called "forams") are single-celled organisms, members of a phylum or class of Rhizarian protists characterized by streaming granular ectoplasm for catching food and other uses; and commonly an external shell called a test of diverse forms and materials. Tests of chitin (found in some simple genera, and Textularia in particular) are believed to be the most primitive type. Most foraminifera are marine, the majority of which live on or within the seafloor sediment (i.e., are benthic, with different sized species playing a role within the macrobenthos, meiobenthos, and microbenthos), while a smaller number float in the water column at various depths (i.e., are planktonic), which belong to the suborder Globigerinina. Fewer are known from freshwater or brackish conditions, and some very few (nonaquatic) soil species have been identified through molecular analysis of small subunit ribosomal DNA.

Foraminifera typically produce a foraminifera test, or shell, which can have either one or multiple chambers, some becoming quite elaborate in structure. These shells are commonly made of calcium carbonate (CaCO_{3}) or agglutinated sediment particles. Over 50,000 species are recognized, both living (6,700–10,000) and fossil (40,000). They are usually less than 1 mm in size, but some are much larger, the largest species reaching up to 20 cm.

In modern scientific English, the term foraminifera is both singular and plural (irrespective of the word's Latin derivation), and is used to describe one or more specimens or taxa: its usage as singular or plural must be determined from context. Foraminifera is frequently used informally to describe the group, and in these cases is generally lowercase.

== History of study ==
The earliest known reference to foraminifera comes from Strabo, who in the 1st century BCE noted them as making up the rock that forms the Great Pyramid of Giza and suggested that they were the remains of lentils left by the workers who built the pyramids. These are today recognized as representatives of the genus Nummulites.

Robert Hooke observed a foraminifera under the microscope, as described and illustrated in his 1665 book Micrographia:

I was trying several small and single Magnifying Glasses, and casually viewing a parcel of white Sand, when I perceiv'd one of the grains exactly shap'd and wreath'd like a Shell ... I view'd it every way with a better Microscope and found it on both sides, and edge-ways, to resemble the Shell of a small Water-Snail with a flat spiral Shell ...

Antonie van Leeuwenhoek described and illustrated foraminiferal tests in 1700, describing them as minute cockles; his illustration is recognizable as being Elphidium. Early workers classified foraminifera within the genus Nautilus, noting their similarity to certain cephalopods. It was recognised by Lorenz Spengler in 1781 that foraminifera had holes in the septa, which would eventually grant the group its name. Spengler also noted that the septa of foraminifera arced the opposite way from those of nautili and that they lacked a nerve tube.

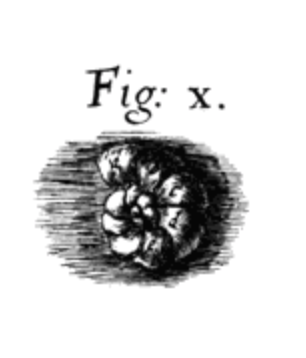
Earliest known illustration of a foraminifera shell, published by Robert Hooke in his 1665 book Micrographia

Alcide d'Orbigny, in his 1826 work, considered them to be a group of minute cephalopods and noted their odd morphology, interpreting the pseudopodia as tentacles and noting the highly reduced (in actuality, absent) head. He named the group foraminifères, or "hole-bearers", as members of the group had holes in the divisions between compartments in their shells, in contrast to nautili or ammonites.

The protozoan nature of foraminifera was first recognized by Dujardin in 1835. Shortly after, in 1852, d'Orbigny produced a classification scheme, recognising 72 genera of foraminifera, which he classified based on test shape—a scheme that drew severe criticism from colleagues.

H. B. Brady's 1884 monograph described the foraminiferal finds of the Challenger expedition. Brady recognized 10 families with 29 subfamilies, with little regard to stratigraphic range; his taxonomy emphasized the idea that multiple different characters must separate taxonomic groups, and as such placed agglutinated and calcareous genera in close relation.

This overall scheme of classification would remain until Cushman's work in the late 1920s. Cushman viewed wall composition as the single most important trait in classification of foraminifera; his classification became widely accepted but also drew criticism from colleagues for being "not biologically sound".

Geologist Irene Crespin undertook extensive research in this field, publishing some ninety papers—including notable work on foraminifera—as sole author as well as more than twenty in collaboration with other scientists.

Cushman's scheme nevertheless remained the dominant scheme of classification until Tappan and Loeblich's 1964 classification, which placed foraminifera into the general groupings still used today, based on microstructure of the test wall. These groups have been variously moved around according to different schemes of higher-level classification. Pawlowski's (2013) use of molecular systematics has generally confirmed Tappan and Loeblich's groupings, with some being found as polyphyletic or paraphyletic; this work has also helped to identify higher-level relationships among major foraminiferal groups.

== Taxonomy ==
- "Monothalamids" (paraphyletic)
- - - Lagenida
    - - "Monothalamids"
      - Tubothalamea
        - Miliolida
        - Spirillinida
  - - - "Monothalamids"
      - Xenophyophorea
    - Globothalamea
      - Robertinida
      - Rotaliida
      - "Textulariida" (paraphyletic)

Phylogeny of Foraminifera following Pawlowski et al. 2013. The monothalamid orders Astrorhizida and Allogromiida are both paraphyletic.

The taxonomic position of the Foraminifera has varied since Schultze in 1854, who referred to as an order, Foraminiferida. Loeblich (1987) and Tappan (1992) reranked Foraminifera as a class as it is now commonly regarded.

The Foraminifera have typically been included in the Protozoa, or in the similar Protoctista or Protist kingdom. Compelling evidence, based primarily on molecular phylogenetics, exists for their belonging to a major group within the Protozoa known as the Rhizaria. Prior to the recognition of evolutionary relationships among the members of the Rhizaria, the Foraminifera were generally grouped with other amoeboids as phylum Rhizopodea (or Sarcodina) in the class Granuloreticulosa.

Cavalier-Smith defines the Rhizaria as an infra-kingdom within the kingdom Protozoa.

Some taxonomies put the Foraminifera in a phylum of their own, putting them on par with the amoeboid Sarcodina in which they had been placed.

Although as yet unsupported by morphological correlates, molecular data strongly suggest the Foraminifera are closely related to the Cercozoa and Radiolaria, both of which also include amoeboids with complex shells; these three groups make up the Rhizaria. However, the exact relationships of the forams to the other groups and to one another are still not entirely clear. Foraminifera are closely related to testate amoebae.

Taxonomy from Mikhalevich 2013
* Foraminifera d'Orbigny 1826
  - Order Reticulomyxida
  - Class Schizocladea Cedhagen & Mattson 1992
    - Order Schizocladida
  - Class Xenophyophorea Schultze 1904
    - Order Stannomida Tendal 1972
    - Order Psamminida Tendal 1972
  - Class Astrorhizata Saidova 1981
    - Subclass Lagynana Mikhalevich 1980
      - Order Ammoscalariida Mikhalevich 1980
      - Order Lagynida Mikhalevich 1980
      - Order Allogromiida Loeblich & Tappan 1961
    - Subclass Astrorhizana Saidova 1981
      - Order Astrorhizida Lankester 1885
      - Order Dendrophryida Mikhalevich 1995
      - Order Hippocrepinida Saidova 1981
      - Order †Parathuramminida Mikhalevich 1980
      - Order Psammosphaerida Haeckel 1894
  - Class Rotaliata Mikhalevich 1980 (hyaline foraminifers)
    - Subclass Globigerinana Mikhalevich 1980
      - Order Cassigerinellida Mikhalevich 2013
      - Order Globigerinida Carpenter, Parker & Jones 1862
      - Order Hantkeninida Mikhalevich 1980
      - Order Heterohelicida Fursenko 1958
      - Order Globorotaliida Mikhalevich 1980
    - Subclass Textulariana Mikhalevich 1980
      - Order Nautiloculinida Mikhalevich 2003
      - Order Spiroplectamminida Mikhalevich 1992
      - Order Textulariida Delage & Hérouard 1896
      - Order Trochamminida Saidova 1981 (Carterinida Loeblich & Tappan 1955]
      - Order Verneuilinida Mikhalevich & Kaminski 2003
    - Subclass Rotaliana Mikhalevich 1980
      - Superorder Robertinoida Mikhalevich 1980
        - Order Robertinida Mikhalevich 1980
      - Superorder Nonionoida Saidova 1981
        - Order Elphidiida Saidova 1981
        - Order Nummulitida Carpenter, Parker & Jones 1862
        - Order †Orbitoidida Copeland 1956
        - Order Nonionida Saidova 1981
      - Superorder Buliminoida Saidova 1981
        - Order Cassidulinida d'Orbigny 1839
        - Order Buliminida Saidova 1981
        - Order Bolivinitida Saidova 1981
      - Superorder Discorboida Ehrenberg 1838
        - Order Chilostomellida Haeckel 1894
        - Order Discorbida Ehrenberg 1838
        - Order Glabratellida Mikhalevich 1994
        - Order Planorbulinida Mikhalevich 1992
        - Order Rotaliida Lankester 1885
        - Order Rosalinida Delage & Hérouard 1896
  - Class Nodosariata Mikhalevich 1992
    - Subclass Hormosinana Mikhalevich 1992
      - Order Ammomarginulinida Mikhalevich 2002
      - Order Nouriida Mikhalevich 1980
      - Order †Pseudopalmulida Mikhalevich 1992
      - Order Saccamminida Lankester 1885
      - Order Hormosinida Mikhalevich 1980
    - Subclass Nodosariana Mikhalevich 1992
      - Order †Biseriamminida Mikhalevich 1981
      - Order Delosinida Revets 1989
      - Order Lagenida Delage & Hérouard 1896
      - Order †Palaeotextulariida Hohenegger & Piller 1975
      - Order Polymorphinida Mikhalevich 1980
      - Order Vaginulinida Mikhalevich 1993
      - Order Nodosariida Calkins 1926
  - Class Spirillinata Mikhalevich 1992
    - Subclass Ammodiscana Mikhalevich 1980
      - Order †Plagioraphida Mikhalevich 2003
      - Order Ammodiscida Mikhalevich 1980 [Pseudoammodiscoida Conil & Lys 1970]
      - Order Ammovertellinida Mikhalevich 1999
      - Order Ataxophragmiida Fursenko 1958 [Orbitolinida Ehrenberg 1839]
    - Subclass Spirillinana Mikhalevich 1992
      - Superorder †Archaediscoida Pojarkov & Skvortsov 1979
        - Order †Archaediscida Pojarkov & Skvortsov 1979
        - Order †Lasiodiscida Mikhalevich 1993
        - Order †Tetrataxida Mikhalevich 1981
      - Superorder Involutinoida Hohenegger & Piller 1977
        - Order †Hottingerellida Mikhalevich 1993
        - Order Involutinida Hohenegger & Piller 1977
      - Superorder Spirillinoida Hohenegger & Piller 1975
        - Order Seabrookiida Mikhalevich 1980
        - Order Cymbaloporida Mikhaelevich 2013
        - Order Spirillinida Hohenegger & Piller 1975
        - Order Patellinida Mikhalevich 1992
  - Class Miliolata Saidova 1981 (porcelaneous foraminifers)
    - Subclass Schlumbergerinana Mikhalevich 1992
      - Order Lituotubida Mikhalevich 1992
      - Order Loftusiida Kaminski & Mikhalevich 2004
      - Order Sphaeramminida Mikhalevich & Kaminski 2004
      - Order Cyclolinida Mikhalevich 1992
      - Order Haplophragmiida Loeblich & Tappan 1989
      - Order Schlumbergerinida Mikhalevich 1980 [Rzehakinida Saidova 1981]
      - Order Lituolida Lankester 1885
      - Subclass Miliolana Saidova 1981
      - Clade Fusulinoids
        - Order †Ozawainellida Solovieva 1980
        - Order †Endothyroida Fursenko 1958
        - Order †Tournayellida Hohenegger & Piller 1973
        - Order †Fusulinida Fursenko 1958
        - Order †Neoschwagerinida Minato & Honjo 1966
        - Order †Schubertellida Skinner 1931
        - Order †Schwagerinida Solovieva 1985
        - Order †Staffellida Miklukho-Maklay 1949
      - Clade Milioloids
        - Order †Costiferida Mikhalevich 1988
        - Order Squamulinida Mikhalevich 1988
        - Order Cornuspirida Jirovec 1953
        - Order Soritida Schultze 1854 [Orbitolitida Wedekind 1937]
        - Order Nubeculariida Jones 1875
        - Order Miliolida Delage & Hérouard 1896

== Anatomy ==
The most striking aspect of most foraminifera are their hard shells, or tests. These may consist of one of multiple chambers, and may be composed of protein, sediment particles, calcite, aragonite, or (in one case) silica. Some foraminifera lack tests entirely. Unlike other shell-secreting organisms, such as molluscs or corals, the tests of foraminifera are located inside the cell membrane, within the protoplasm. The organelles of the cell are located within the compartment(s) of the test, and the hole(s) of the test allow the transfer of material from the pseudopodia to the internal cell and back.

The foraminiferal cell is divided into granular endoplasm and transparent ectoplasm from which a pseudopodial net may emerge through a single opening or through many perforations in the test. Individual pseudopods characteristically have small granules streaming in both directions. Foraminifera are unique in having granuloreticulose pseudopodia; that is, their pseudopodia appear granular under the microscope; these pseudopodia are often elongate and may split and rejoin each other. These can be extended and retracted to suit the needs of the cell. The pseudopods are used for locomotion, anchoring, excretion, test construction and in capturing food, which consists of small organisms such as diatoms or bacteria.

Aside from the tests, foraminiferal cells are supported by a cytoskeleton of microtubules, which are loosely arranged without the structure seen in other amoeboids. Forams have evolved special cellular mechanisms to quickly assemble and disassemble microtubules, allowing for the rapid formation and retraction of elongated pseudopodia.

Detailed diagram of foraminifera morphology: 1. Test; 2. Proloculus (first chamber); 3. Chambers; 4. Foramen (older apertures); 5. Endoplasm; 6. Lipid globule; 7. Nucleus; 8. Nucleolus; 9. Endoplasmic reticulum, the transport network for molecules going to specific parts of the cell; 10. Annular lamellae; 11. Mitochondrion, creates ATP (energy) for the cell; 12. Nascent annular lamellae; 13. Golgi apparatus; modifies proteins and sends them out of the cell; 14. Digestive vacuole; 15. Peroxisome, generates and scavenges hydrogen peroxide; 16. Phagocytic vacuole; 17. Lysosome, holds enzymes; 18. Adhesive substance vesicle; 19. Aperture (opening of newest chamber); 20. Ectoplasm; 21. Reticulopodia; 22. Adhesive granules; 23. Prey

In the gamont (sexual form), foraminifera generally have only a single nucleus, while the agamont (asexual form) tends to have multiple nuclei. In at least some species the nuclei are dimorphic, with the somatic nuclei containing three times as much protein and RNA than the generative nuclei. However, nuclear anatomy seems to be highly diverse. The nuclei are not necessarily confined to one chamber in multi-chambered species. Nuclei can be spherical or have many lobes. Nuclei are typically 30-50 μm in diameter.

Some species of foraminifera have large, empty vacuoles within their cells; the exact purpose of these is unclear, but they have been suggested to function as a reservoir of nitrate.

Mitochondria are distributed evenly throughout the cell, though in some species they are concentrated under the pores and around the external margin of the cell. This has been hypothesised to be an adaptation to low-oxygen environments.

Several species of xenophyophore have been found to have unusually high concentrations of radioactive isotopes within their cells, among the highest of any eukaryote. The purpose of this is unknown.

== Ecology ==
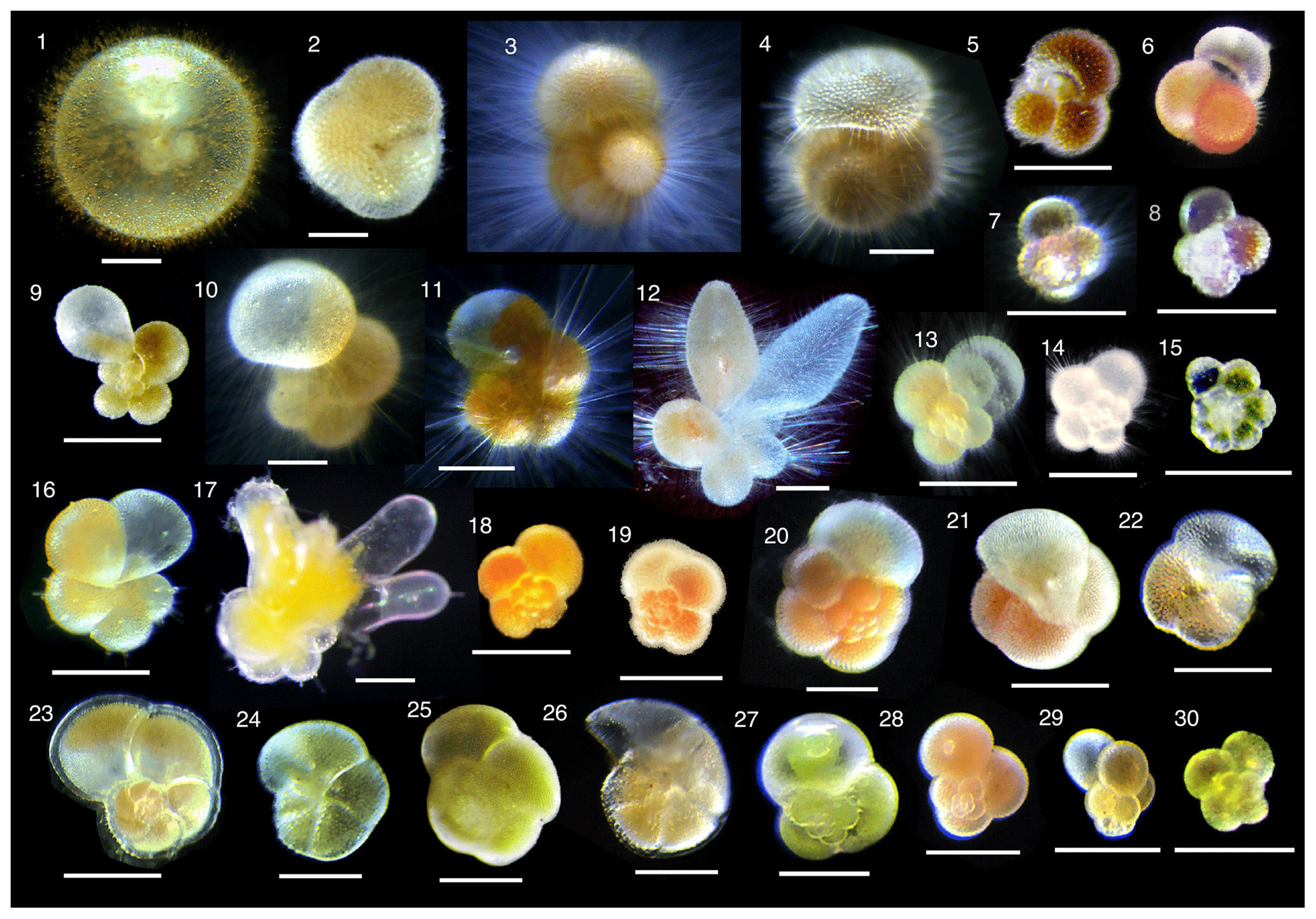
Photomicrographs of living planktonic foraminifera (1) Orbulina universa, (2) Sphaeroidinella dehiscens, (3) Globigerinoides sacculifer, (4) Globigerinoides conglobatus, (5) Globigerinoides ruber (white), (6) Globigerinoides ruber (pink), (7) Globoturborotalita rubescens, (8) Globoturborotalita tenella, (9) Globigerinella calida, (10) Globigerinella siphonifera Type I, (11) Globigerinella siphonifera Type II, (12) Globigerinella adamsi, (13) Globigerina bulloides, (14) Turborotalita quinqueloba, (15) Turborotalita humilis, (16) Hastigerina pelagica, (17) Hastigerinella digitata, (18) Neogloboquadrina incompta, (19) Neogloboquadrina pachyderma, (20) Neogloboquadrina dutertrei, (21) Pulleniatina obliquiloculata, (22) Globorotalia inflata, (23) Globorotalia menardii, (24) Globorotalia scitula, (25) Globorotalia crassaformis, (26) Globorotalia truncatulinoides, (27) Candeina nitida, (28) Globigerinita glutinata, (29) Globigerinita uvula, and (30) Tenuitella fleisheri. Scale bars 200 μm

Modern Foraminifera are primarily marine organisms, but living individuals have been found in brackish, freshwater and even terrestrial habitats. The majority of the species are benthic, and a further 50 morphospecies are planktonic. This count may, however, represent only a fraction of actual diversity, since many genetically distinct species may be morphologically indistinguishable.

Benthic foraminifera are typically found in fine-grained sediments, where they actively move between layers; however, many species are found on hard rock substrates, attached to seaweeds, or sitting atop the sediment surface.

The majority of planktonic foraminifera are found in the globigerinina, a lineage within the rotaliida. However, at least one other extant rotaliid lineage, Neogallitellia, seems to have independently evolved a planktonic lifestyle. Further, it has been suggested that some Jurassic fossil foraminifera may have also independently evolved a planktonic lifestyle, and may be members of Robertinida.

A number of forams, both benthic and planktonic, have unicellular algae as endosymbionts, from diverse lineages such as the green algae, red algae, golden algae, diatoms, and dinoflagellates. These mixotrophic foraminifers are particularly common in nutrient-poor oceanic waters. Some forams are kleptoplastic, retaining chloroplasts from ingested algae to conduct photosynthesis.

Most foraminifera are heterotrophic, consuming smaller organisms and organic matter; some smaller species are specialised feeders on phytodetritus, while others specialise in consuming diatoms. Some benthic forams construct feeding cysts, using the pseuodopodia to encyst themselves inside of sediment and organic particles. Certain foraminifera prey upon small animals such as copepods or cumaceans; some forams even predate upon other forams, drilling holes into the tests of their prey. One group, the xenophyophores, has been suggested to farm bacteria within their tests, although studies have failed to find support for this hypothesis. Suspension feeding is also common in the group, and at least some species can take advantage of dissolved organic carbon.

A few foram species are parasitic, infecting sponges, molluscs, corals, or even other foraminifera. Parasitic strategies vary; some act as ectoparasites, using their pseudopodia to steal food from the host, while others burrow through the shell or body wall of their host to feed on its soft tissue.

Foraminifera are themselves eaten by a host of larger organisms, including invertebrates, fish, shorebirds, and other foraminifera. It has been suggested, however, that in some cases predators may be more interested in the calcium from foram shells than in the organisms themselves. Several aquatic snail species are known to selectively feed upon foraminifera, often even preferring individual species.

Certain benthic foraminifera have been found to be capable of surviving anoxic conditions for over 24 hours, indicating that they are capable of selective anaerobic respiration. This is interpreted as an adaptation to survive changing oxygenic conditions near the sediment-water interface.

Foraminifera are found in the deepest parts of the ocean such as the Mariana Trench, including the Challenger Deep, the deepest part known. At these depths, below the carbonate compensation depth, the calcium carbonate of the tests is soluble in water due to the extreme pressure. The Foraminifera found in the Challenger Deep thus have no carbonate test, but instead have one of organic material.

Nonmarine foraminifera have traditionally been neglected in foram research, but recent studies show them to be substantially more diverse than previously known. They are known to inhabit disparate ecological niches, including mosses, rivers, lakes and ponds, wetlands, soils, peat bogs, and sand dunes.

== Reproduction ==
The generalized foraminiferal life-cycle involves an alternation between haploid and diploid generations, although they are mostly similar in form. The haploid or gamont initially has a single nucleus, and divides to produce numerous gametes, which typically have two flagella. The diploid or agamont is multinucleate, and after meiosis divides to produce new gamonts. Multiple rounds of asexual reproduction between sexual generations are not uncommon in benthic forms.

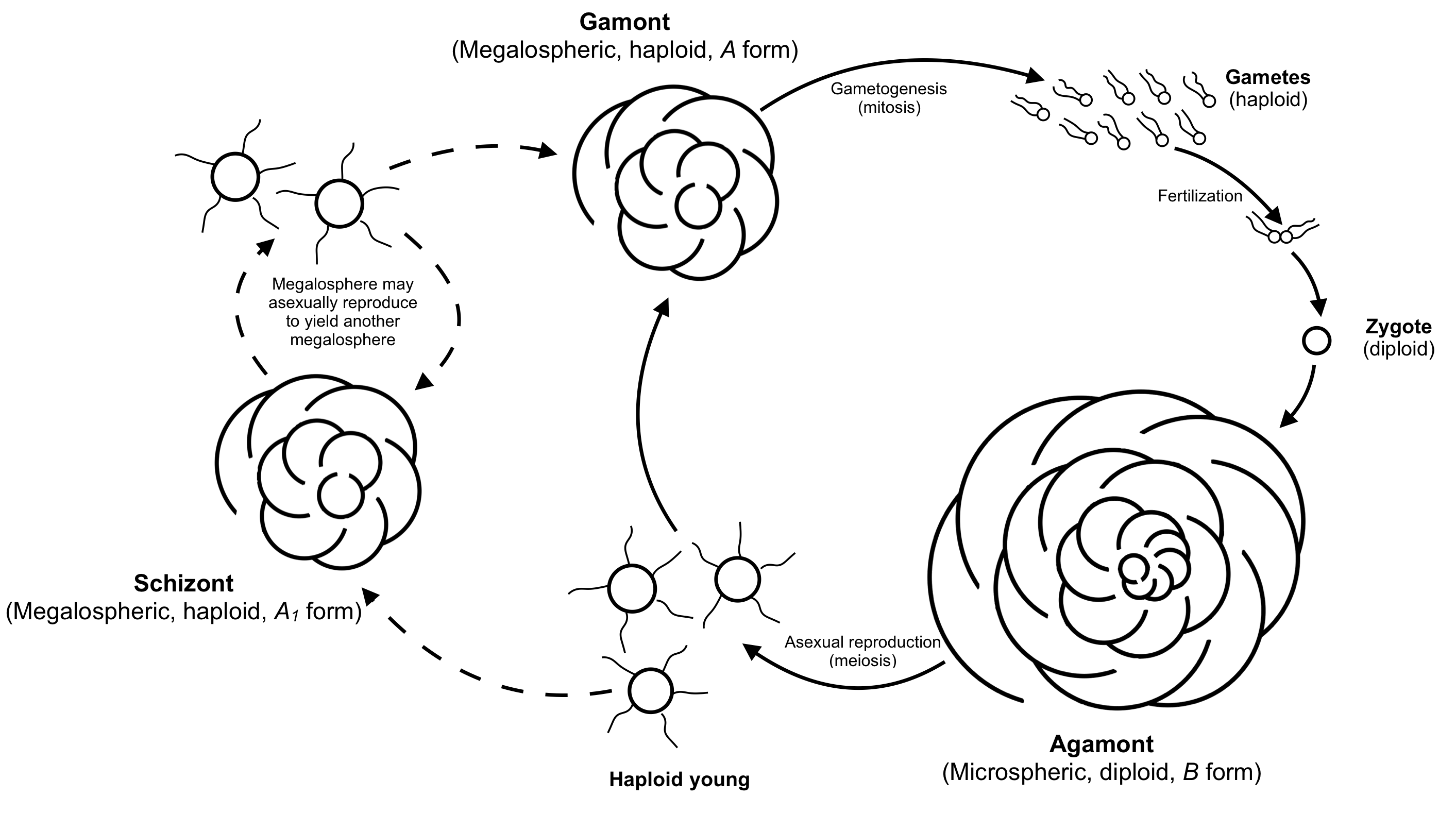
Diagram of a typical foraminiferan life cycle, showing characteristic alternation of generations.

Foraminifera exhibit morphological dimorphism associated with their reproductive cycle. The gamont, or sexually reproducing haploid form, is megalospheric—that is, its proloculus, or first chamber, is proportionally large. The gamont is also known as the A form. Gamonts, despite having typically larger proloculi, also generally have smaller overall test diameter than do agamonts.

After reaching maturity, the gamont divides via mitosis to produce thousands of gametes which are also haploid. These gametes all have a full set of organelles, and are expelled from the test into the environment leaving the test undamaged. Gametes are not differentiated into sperm and egg, and any two gametes from a species can generally fertilize each other.

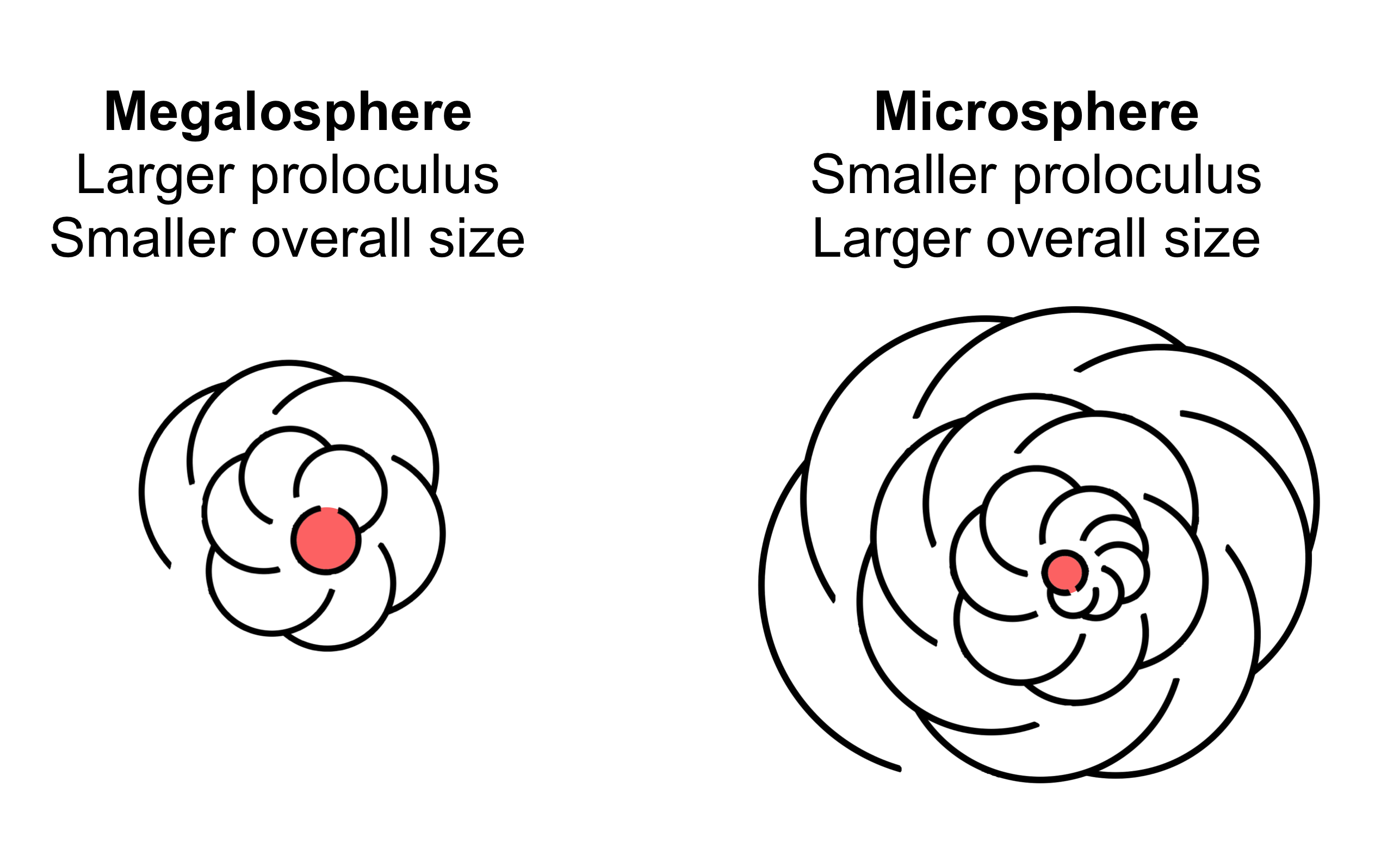
Morphs present in the foram life cycle—the megalosphere and the microsphere. The name derives from the size of the proloculus, or first chamber, and as such the microsphere has a larger overall size.

When two gametes combine, they create a diploid, multi-nucleated cell known as the agamont, or B form. In contrast to the gamont, the agamont is microspheric, with a proportionally small first chamber but typically larger overall diameter with more chambers. The agamont is the asexual reproduction phase of the foraminifera; upon reaching adulthood, the protoplasm entirely vacates the test and divides its cytoplasm meiotically via multiple fission to form a number of haploid offspring. These offspring then begin to form their megalospheric first chamber before dispersing.

In some cases the haploid young may mature into a megalospheric form which then reproduces asexually to produce another megalospheric, haploid offspring. In this case, the first megalospheric form is referred to as the schizont or A_{1} form, while the second is referred to as the gamont or A_{2} form.

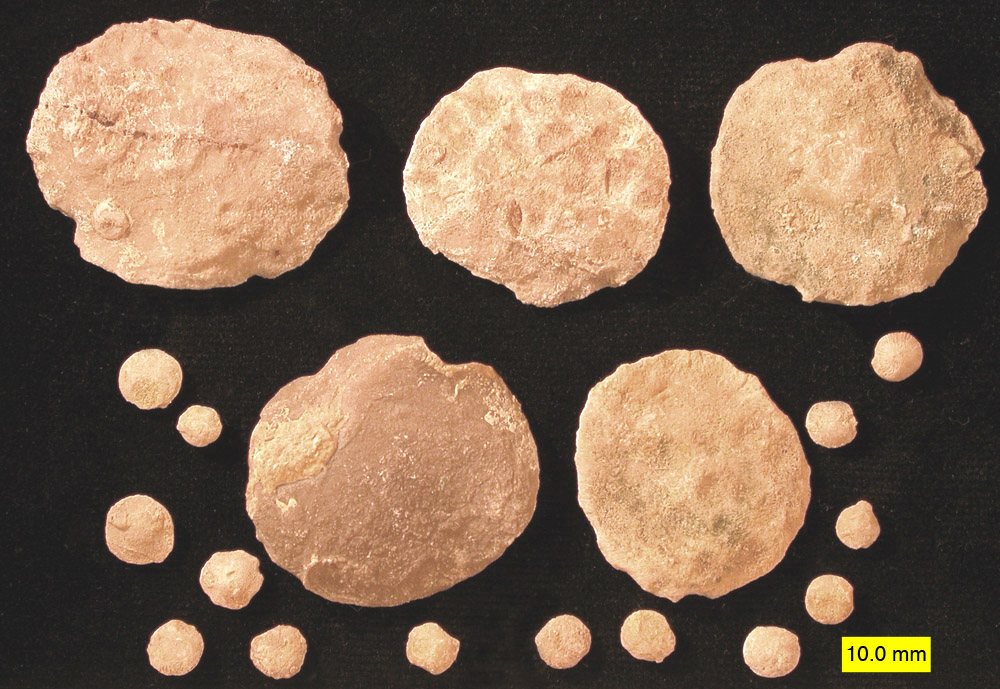
Fossil nummulitid foraminiferans showing microspheric (larger) and megalospheric individuals (smaller); Eocene of the United Arab Emirates; scale in mm

Maturation and reproduction occur more slowly in cooler and deeper water; these conditions also cause forams to grow larger. A forms always seem to be much more numerous than are B forms, likely due to the reduced likelihood of two gametes encountering one another and successfully combining.

=== Variations in reproductive mode ===
There is a high degree of diversity in reproductive strategies in different foraminiferal groups.

In unilocular species, the A form and B form are still present. As in the microspheric morph of multilocular forams, the asexually reproducing B form is larger than the sexually reproducing A form.

Forams in the family Spirillinidae have amoeboid gametes rather than flagellated. Other aspects of reproduction in this group are generally similar to that of other groups of forams.

The calcareous spirillinid Patellina corrugata has a slightly different reproductive strategy than most other foraminifera. The asexually reproducing B form produces a cyst that surrounds the entire cell; it then divides within this cyst and the juvenile cells cannibalise the calcite of the parent's test to form the first chamber of their own test. These A forms, upon maturity, gather into groups of up to nine individuals; they then form a protective cyst around the whole group. Gametogenesis occurs within this cyst, producing very low numbers of gametes. The B form larvae are produced inside of the cyst; any nuclei that are not bound into cells are consumed as food for the developing larvae. Patellina in A form is reportedly dioecious, with sexes referred to as the "plus" and "minus"; these sexes differ in number of nuclei, with the "plus" form having three nuclei and the "minus" form having four nuclei. The B form is again larger than the A form.

== Tests ==
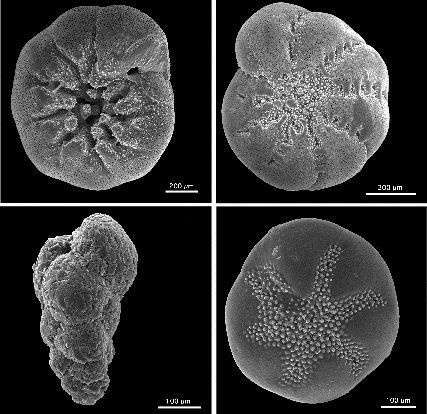
Foraminiferan tests (ventral view)

Foraminiferal tests serve to protect the organism within. Owing to their generally hard and durable construction (compared to other protists), the tests of foraminifera are a major source of scientific knowledge about the group.

Openings in the test that allow the cytoplasm to extend outside are called apertures. The primary aperture, leading to the exterior, take many different shapes in different species, including but not limited to rounded, crescent-shaped, slit-shaped, hooded, radiate (star-shaped), dendritic (branching). Some foraminifera have "toothed", flanged, or lipped primary apertures. There may be only one primary aperture or multiple; when multiple are present, they may be clustered or equatorial. In addition to the primary aperture, many foraminifera have supplemental apertures. These may form as relict apertures (past primary apertures from an earlier growth stage) or as unique structures.

Test shape is highly variable among different foraminifera; they may be single-chambered (unilocular) or multi-chambered (multilocular). In multilocular forms, new chambers are added as the organism grows. A wide variety of test morphologies is found in both unilocular and multilocular forms, including spiraled, serial, and milioline, among others.

Many foraminifera exhibit dimorphism in their tests, with megalospheric and microspheric individuals. These names should not be taken as referring to the size of the full organism; rather, they refer to the size of the first chamber, or proloculus. Tests as fossils are known from as far back as the Ediacaran period, and many marine sediments are composed primarily of them. For instance, the limestone that makes up the pyramids of Egypt is composed almost entirely of nummulitic benthic Foraminifera. It is estimated that reef Foraminifera generate about 43 million tons of calcium carbonate per year.

Genetic studies have identified the naked amoeba Reticulomyxa and the peculiar xenophyophores as foraminiferans without tests. A few other amoeboids produce reticulose pseudopods, and were formerly classified with the forams as the Granuloreticulosa, but this is no longer considered a natural group, and most are now placed among the Cercozoa.

== Evolutionary history ==
Molecular clocks indicate that the crown-group of foraminifera likely evolved during the Neoproterozoic, between 900 and 650 million years ago; this timing is consistent with Neoproterozoic fossils of the closely related filose amoebae. As fossils of foraminifera have not been found prior to the very end of the Ediacaran, it is likely that most of these Proterozoic forms did not have hard-shelled tests.

Due to their non-mineralised tests, "allogromiids" have no fossil record.

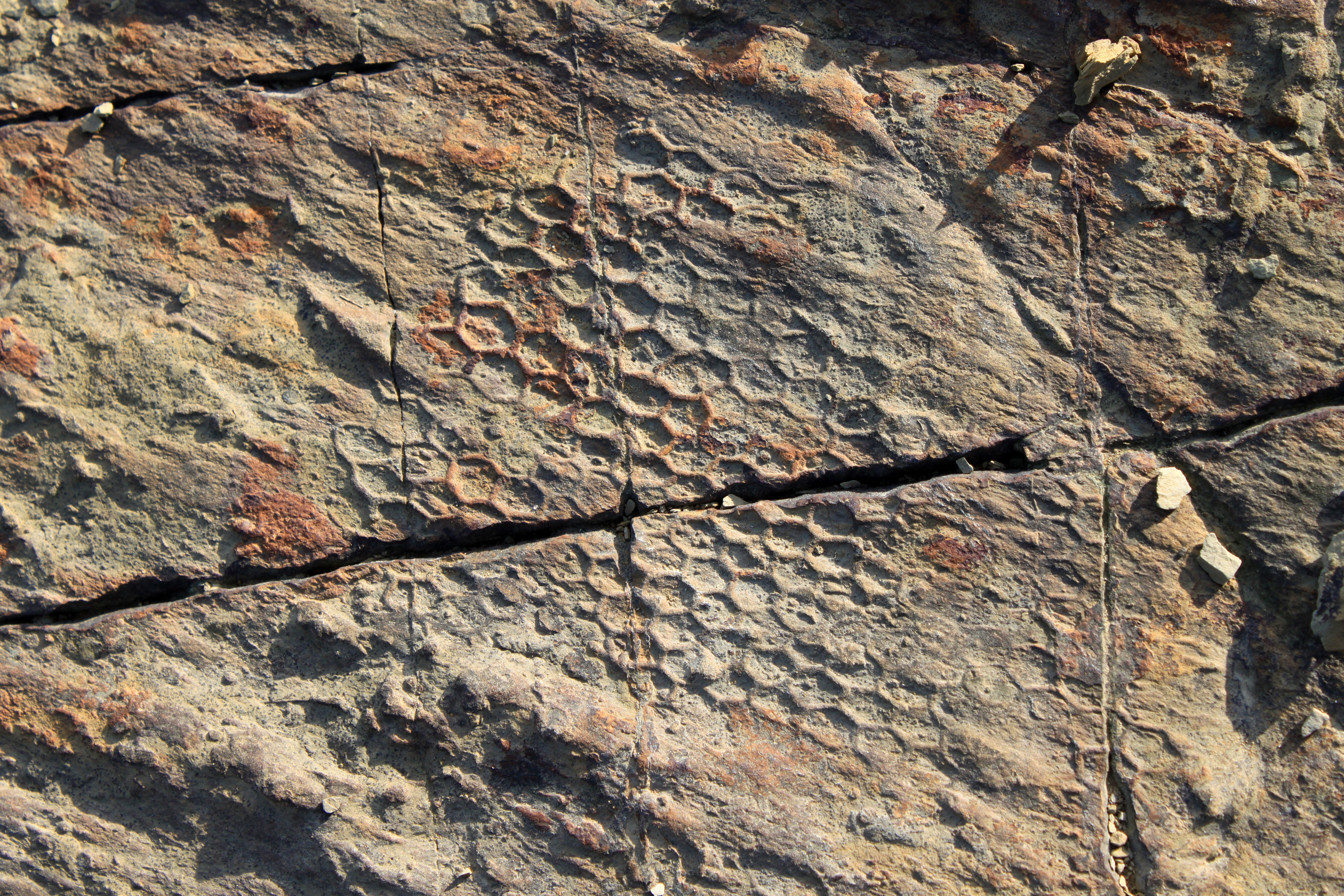
The mysterious Paleodictyon has been interpreted as a fossil xenophyophore but this remains controversial.

The mysterious Vendobionta of the Ediacaran period have been suggested to represent fossil xenophyophores. However, the discovery of diagenetically altered C_{27} sterols associated with the remains of Dickinsonia cast doubt on this identification and suggest it may instead be an animal. Other researchers have suggested that the elusive trace fossil Paleodictyon and its relatives may represent a fossil xenophyophore and noted the similarity of the extant xenophyophore Occultammina to the fossil; however, modern examples of Paleodictyon have not been able to clear up the issue and the trace may alternately represent a burrow or a glass sponge. Supporting this notion is the similar habitat of living xenophyophores to the inferred habitat of fossil graphoglyptids; however, the large size and regularity of many graphoglyptids as well as the apparent absence of xenophyae in their fossils casts doubt on the possibility. As of 2017 no definite xenophyophore fossils have been found.

Test-bearing foraminifera have an excellent fossil record throughout the Phanerozoic eon. The earliest known definite foraminifera appear in the fossil record towards the very end of the Ediacaran; these forms all have agglutinated tests and are unilocular. These include forms like Platysolenites and Spirosolenites. Single-chambered foraminifera continued to diversify throughout the Cambrian. Some commonly encountered forms include Ammodiscus, Glomospira, Psammosphera, and Turritellella; these species are all agglutinated. They make up part of the Ammodiscina, a lineage of spirillinids that still contains modern forms. Later spirillinids would evolve multilocularity and calcitic tests, with the first such forms appearing during the Triassic; the group saw little effects on diversity due to the K-Pg extinction.

The earliest multi-chambered foraminifera are agglutinated species, and appear in the fossil record during the middle Cambrian period. Due to their poor preservation they cannot be positively assigned to any major foram group.

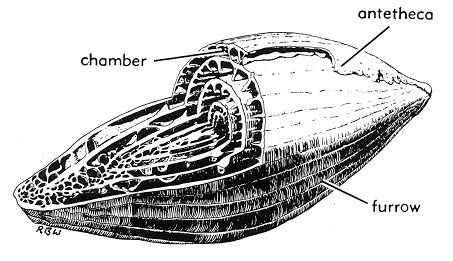
Cutaway view of a Fusulinid

The earliest known calcareous-walled foraminifera are the Fusulinids, which appear in the fossil record during the Llandoverian epoch of the early Silurian. The earliest of these were microscopic, planispirally coiled, and evolute; later forms evolved a diversity of shapes including lenticular, globular, and elongated rice-shaped forms.

Later species of fusulinids grew to much larger size, with some forms reaching 5 cm in length; reportedly, some specimens reach up to 14 cm in length, making them among the largest foraminifera extant or extinct. Fusulinids are the earliest lineage of foraminifera thought to have evolved symbiosis with photosynthetic organisms. Fossils of fusulinids have been found on all continents except Antarctica; they reached their greatest diversity during the Visean epoch of the Carboniferous. The group then gradually declined in diversity until finally going extinct during the Permo-Triassic extinction event.

During the Tournaisian epoch of the Carboniferous, Miliolid foraminifera first appeared in the fossil record, having diverged from the spirillinids within the Tubothalamea. Miliolids suffered about 50% casualties during both the Permo-Triassic and K-Pg extinctions but survived to the present day. Some fossil miliolids reached up to 2 cm in diameter.

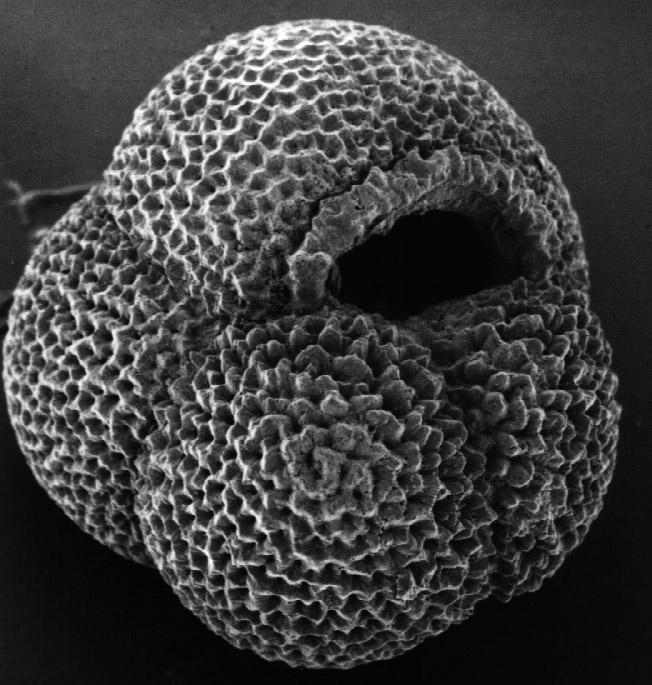
A fossil test from a planktonic globigerininan foraminifera.

The earliest known Lagenid fossils appear during the Moscovian epoch of the Carboniferous. Seeing little effect due to the Permo-Triassic or K-Pg extinctions, the group diversified through time. Secondarily unilocular taxa evolved during the Jurassic and Cretaceous.

The earliest Involutinid fossils appear during the Permian; the lineage diversified throughout the Mesozoic of Eurasia before apparently vanishing from the fossil record following the Cenomanian-Turonian Ocean Anoxic Event. The extant group planispirillinidae has been referred to the involutinida, but this remains the subject of debate.

The Robertinida first appear in the fossil record during the Anisian epoch of the Triassic. The group remained at low diversity throughout its fossil history; all living representatives belong to the Robertinidae, which first appeared during the Paleocene.

The first definite Rotaliid fossils do not appear in the fossil record until the Pliensbachian epoch of the Jurassic, following the Triassic-Jurassic event. Diversity of the group remained low until the aftermath of the Cenomanian-Turonian event, after which the group saw a rapid diversification. Of this group, the planktonic Globigerinina—the first known group of planktonic forams—first appears in the aftermath of the Toarcian Turnover; the group saw heavy losses during both the K-Pg extinction and the Eocene-Oligocene extinction, but remains extant and diverse to this day. An additional evolution of planktonic lifestyle occurred in the Miocene or Pliocene, when the rotaliid Neogallitellia independently evolved a planktonic lifestyle.

== Paleontological applications ==
Dying planktonic Foraminifera continuously rain down on the sea floor in vast numbers, their mineralized tests preserved as fossils in the accumulating sediment. Beginning in the 1960s, and largely under the auspices of the Deep Sea Drilling, Ocean Drilling, and International Ocean Drilling Programmes, as well as for the purposes of oil exploration, advanced deep-sea drilling techniques have been bringing up sediment cores bearing Foraminifera fossils. The effectively unlimited supply of these fossil tests and the relatively high-precision age-control models available for cores has produced an exceptionally high-quality planktonic Foraminifera fossil record dating back to the mid-Jurassic, and presents an unparalleled record for scientists testing and documenting the evolutionary process. The exceptional quality of the fossil record has allowed an impressively detailed picture of species inter-relationships to be developed on the basis of fossils, in many cases subsequently validated independently through molecular genetic studies on extant specimens

Because certain types of foraminifera are found only in certain environments, their fossils can be used to figure out the kind of environment under which ancient marine sediments were deposited; conditions such as salinity, depth, oxygenic conditions, and light conditions can be determined from the different habitat preferences of various species of forams. This allows workers to track changing climates and environmental conditions over time by aggregating information about the foraminifera present.

In other cases, the relative proportion of planktonic to benthic foraminifera fossils found in a rock can be used as a proxy for the depth of a given locality when the rocks were being deposited.

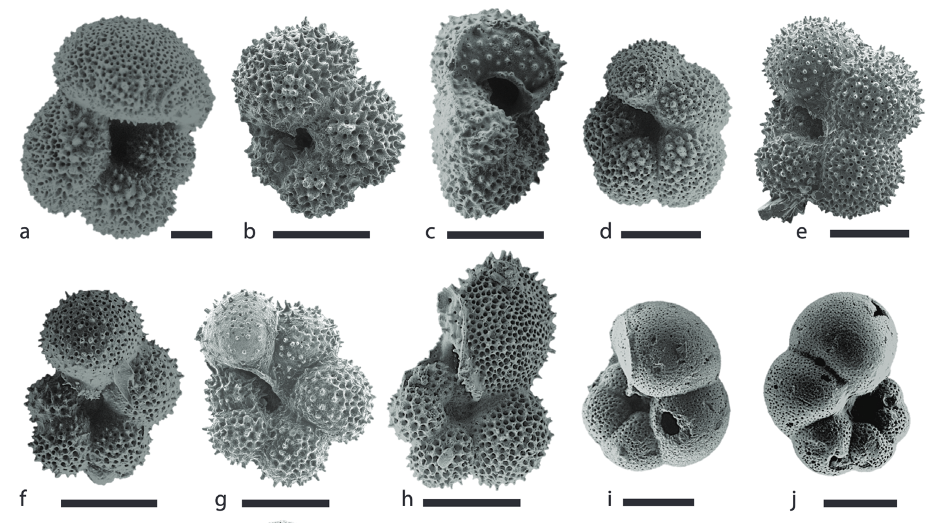
Ten species of planktic foraminifera microfossils from Paleocene-Eocene Thermal Maximum (PETM) sediments in southern Maryland. The scale bars measure 150 microns (0.015 cm). Each specimen is similar in size to a grain of sand.

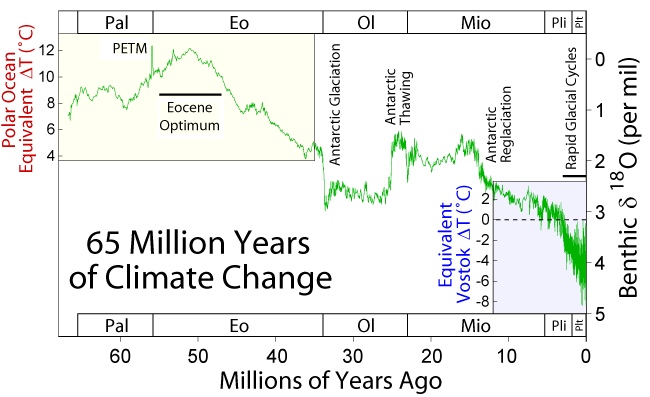
Climate change during the last 65 million years as expressed by the oxygen isotope composition of benthic foraminifera. The Paleocene-Eocene thermal maximum is characterized by a brief but prominent excursion, attributed to rapid warming.

Since at least 1997, the Paleocene–Eocene thermal maximum (PETM) has been investigated as an analogy for understanding the effects of global warming and of massive carbon inputs to the ocean and atmosphere, including ocean acidification. Humans today emit about 10 Gt of carbon (about 37 Gt CO2e) per year, and at that rate will release a comparable amount to the PETM in about one thousand years. A main difference is that during the PETM the planet was ice-free, as the Drake Passage had not yet opened and the Central American Seaway had not yet closed. Although the PETM is now commonly held to be a case study for global warming and massive carbon emission, the cause, details, and overall significance of the event remain uncertain.

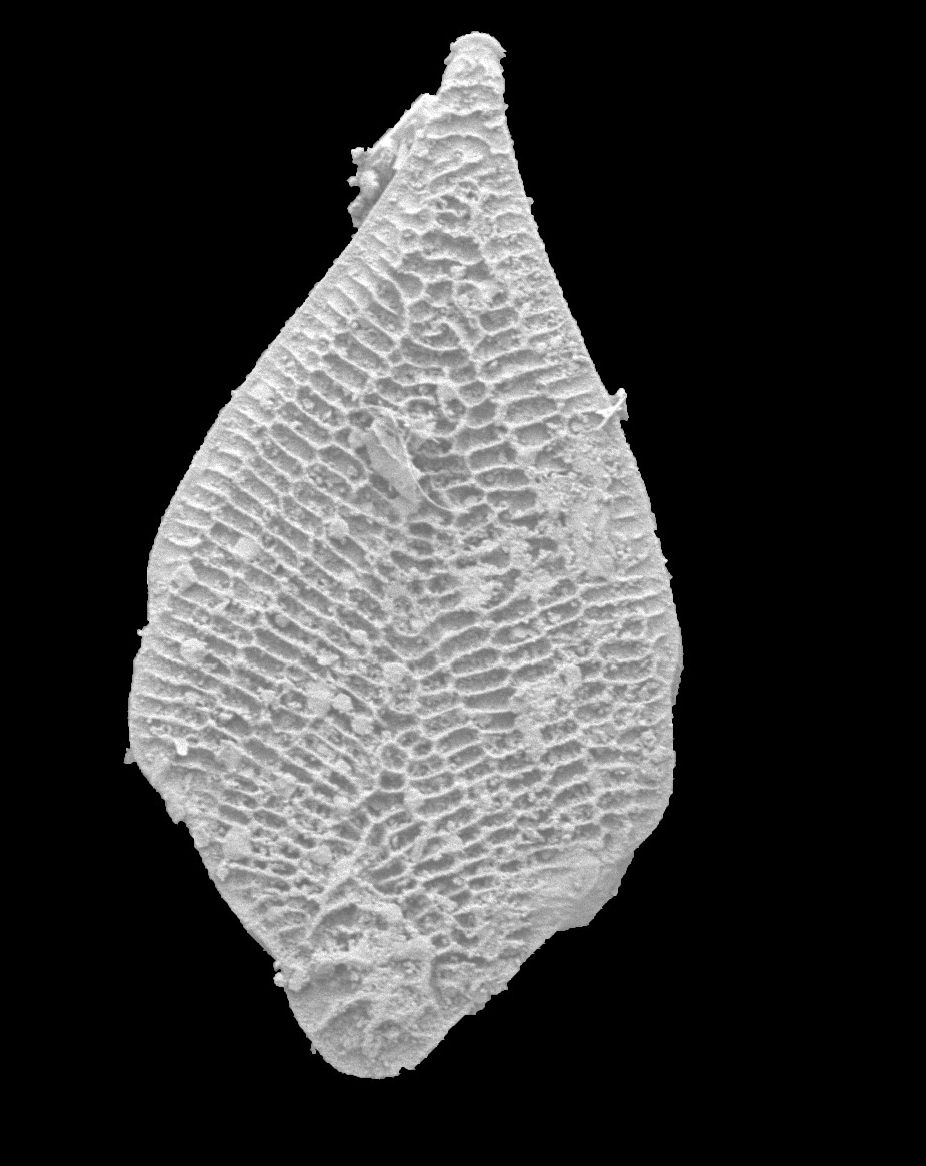
Neoflabellina reticulata from chalk of Rügen, Northeastern Germany. Length:1.2 mm, Age: Upper lower Maastrichtian

Foraminifera have significant application in the field of biostratigraphy. Due to their small size and hard shells, foraminifera may be preserved in great abundance and with high quality of preservation; due to their complex morphology, individual species are easily recognizable. Foraminifera species in the fossil record have limited ranges between the species' first evolution and their disappearance; stratigraphers have worked out the successive changes in foram assemblages throughout much of the Phanerozoic. As such, the assemblage of foraminifera within a given locality can be analyzed and compared to known dates of appearance and disappearance in order to narrow down the age of the rocks. This allows paleontologists to interpret the age of sedimentary rocks when radiometric dating is not applicable. This application of foraminifera was discovered by Alva C. Ellisor in 1920.

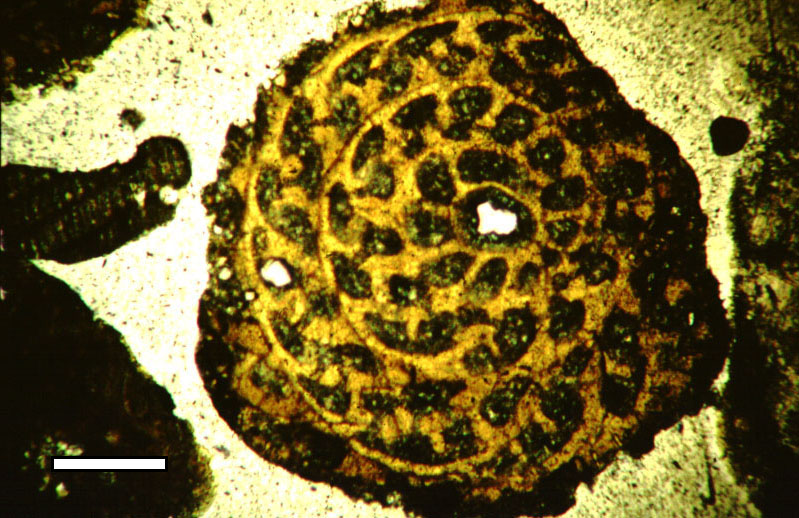
Thin section of a peneroplid foraminiferan from Holocene lagoonal sediment in Rice Bay, San Salvador Island, Bahamas. Scale bar 100 micrometres

Calcareous fossil foraminifera are formed from elements found in the ancient seas where they lived. Thus, they are very useful in paleoclimatology and paleoceanography. They can be used, as a climate proxy, to reconstruct past climate by examining the stable isotope ratios and trace element content of the shells (tests). Global temperature and ice volume can be revealed by the isotopes of oxygen, and the history of the carbon cycle and oceanic productivity by examining the stable isotope ratios of carbon; see δ18O and δ13C. The concentration of trace elements, like strontium (Sr), magnesium (Mg), lithium (Li) and boron (B), also hold a wealth of information about global temperature cycles, continental weathering, and the role of the ocean in the global carbon cycle. Geographic patterns seen in the fossil records of planktonic forams are also used to reconstruct ancient ocean currents.

== Modern uses ==
The oil industry relies heavily on microfossils such as forams to find potential hydrocarbon deposits.

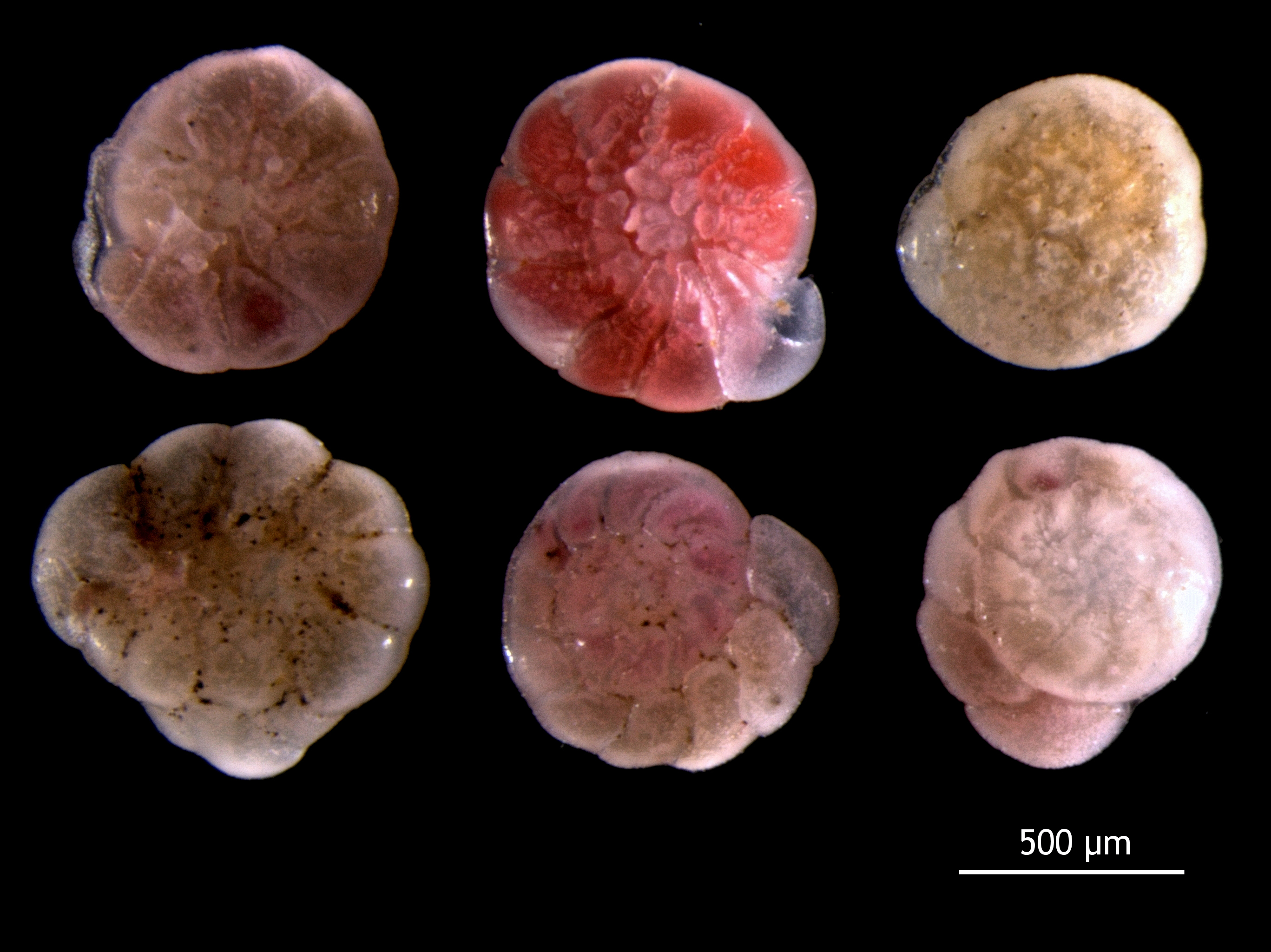
Ammonia beccarii, a benthic foram from the North Sea.

For the same reasons they make useful biostratigraphic markers, living foraminiferal assemblages have been used as bioindicators in coastal environments, including indicators of coral reef health. Because calcium carbonate is susceptible to dissolution in acidic conditions, foraminifera may be particularly affected by changing climate and ocean acidification.

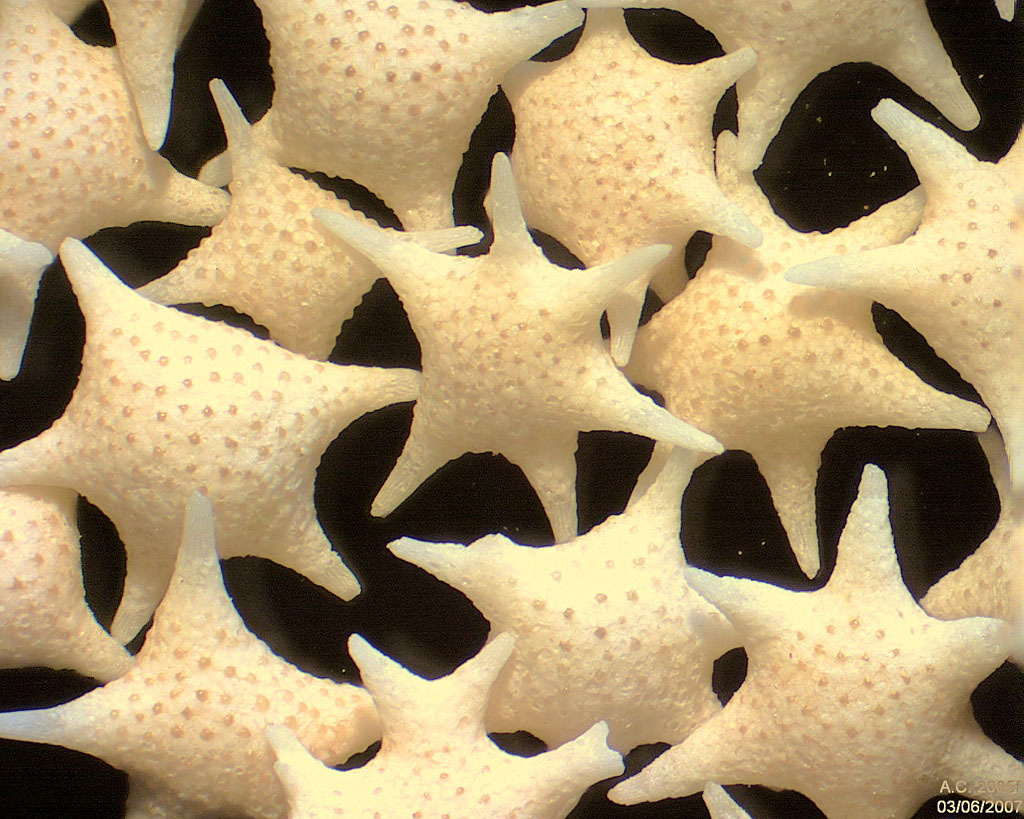
Foraminifera Baculogypsina sphaerulata of Hatoma Island, Japan. Field width 5.22 mm

Foraminifera have many uses in petroleum exploration and are used routinely to interpret the ages and paleoenvironments of sedimentary strata in oil wells. Agglutinated fossil foraminifera buried deeply in sedimentary basins can be used to estimate thermal maturity, which is a key factor for petroleum generation. The Foraminiferal Colouration Index (FCI) is used to quantify colour changes and estimate burial temperature. FCI data is particularly useful in the early stages of petroleum generation (about 100 °C).

Foraminifera can also be used in archaeology in the provenancing of some stone raw material types. Some stone types, such as limestone, are commonly found to contain fossilised foraminifera. The types and concentrations of these fossils within a sample of stone can be used to match that sample to a source known to contain the same "fossil signature".

== Gallery ==
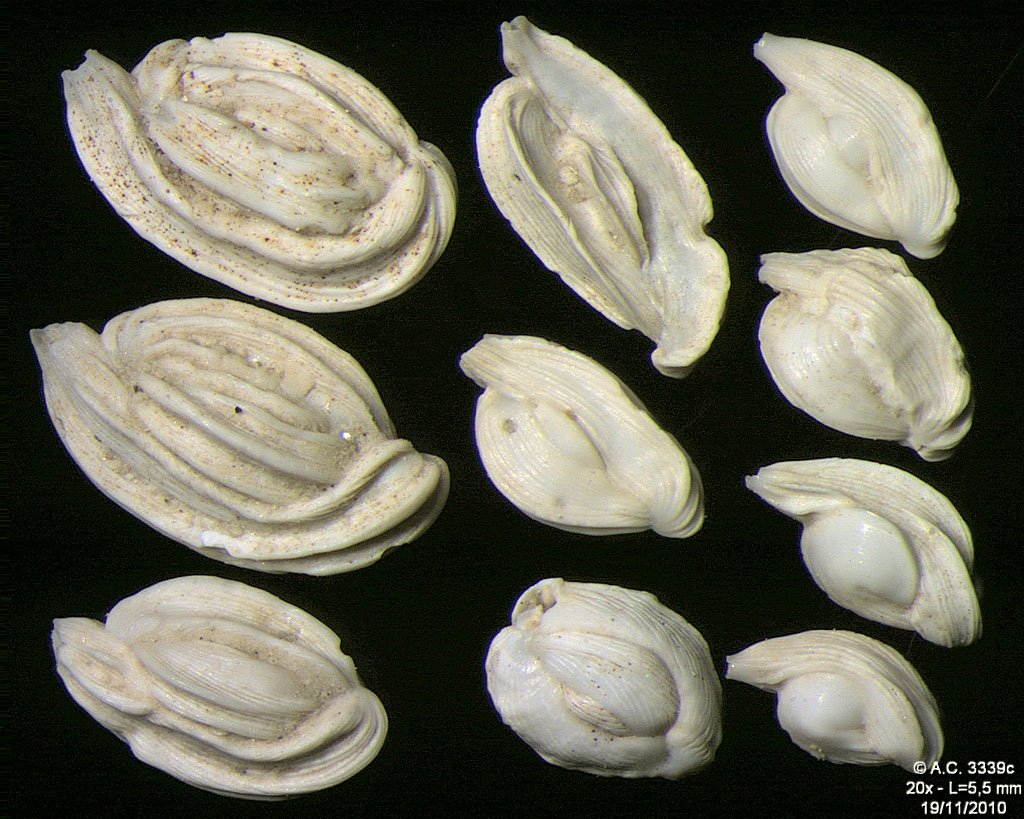
Foraminifera of Pag Island, Adriatic Sea -60 m, field width 5.5 mm

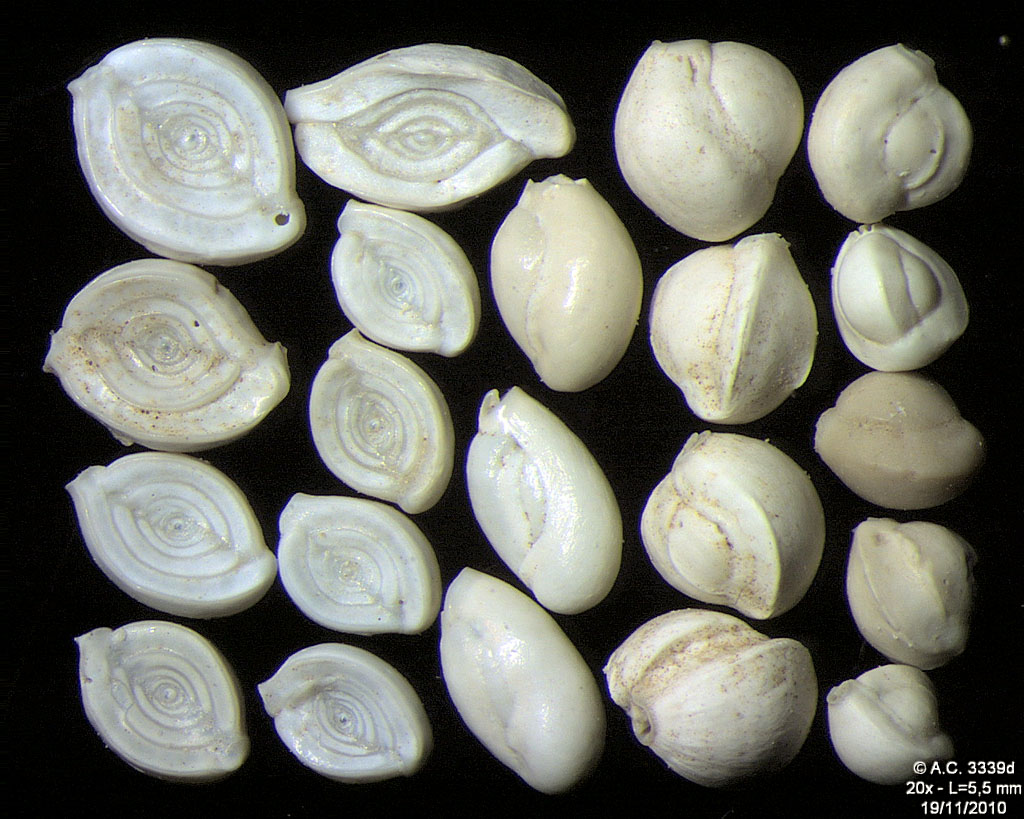
Foraminifera of Pag Island, Adriatic Sea -60 m, field width 5.5 mm

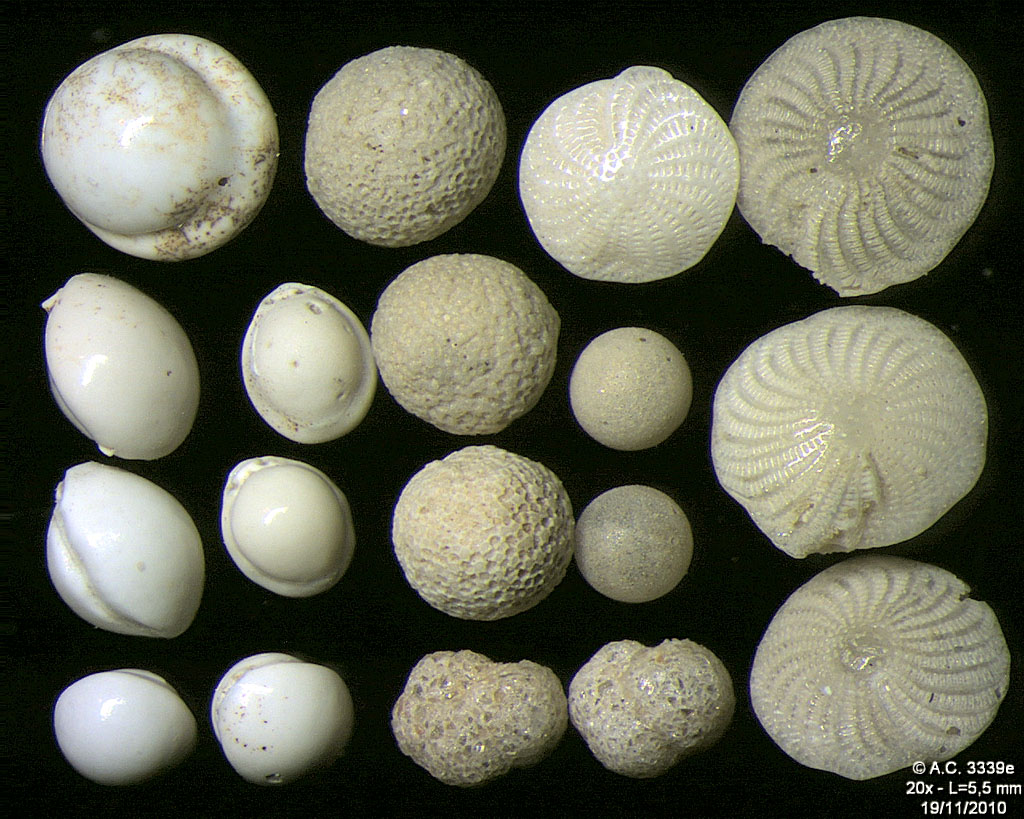
Foraminifera of Pag Island, Adriatic Sea -60 m, field width 5.5 mm

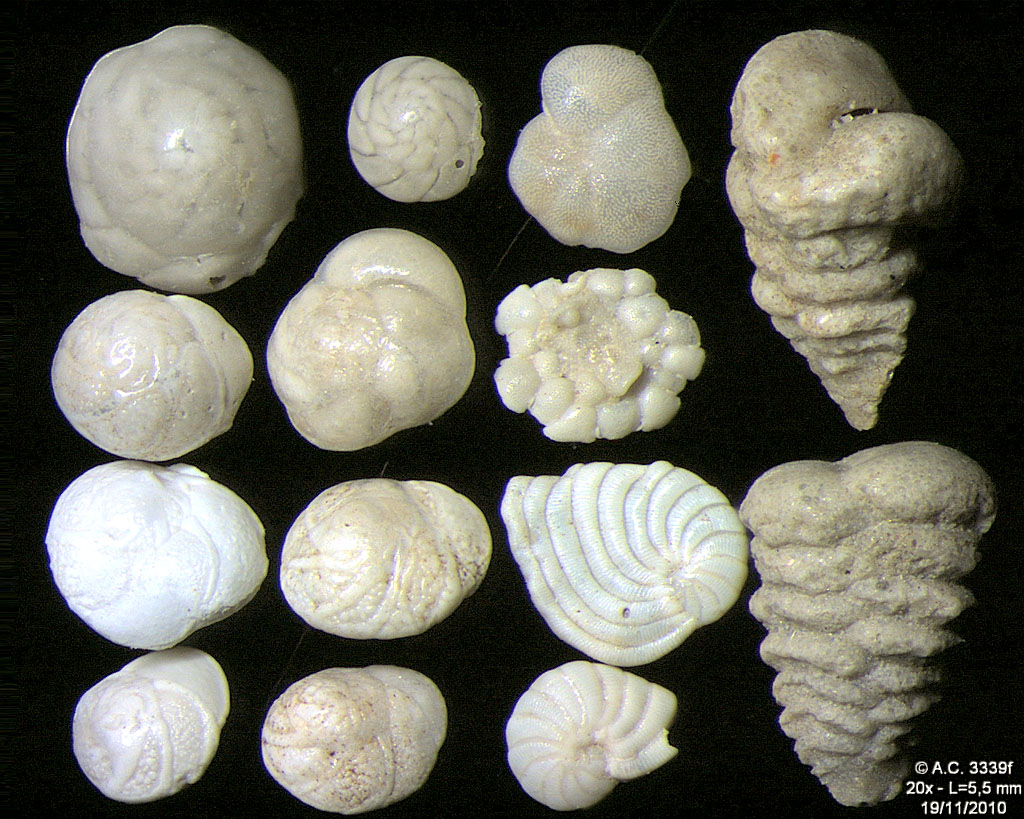
Foraminifera of Pag Island, Adriatic Sea -60 m, field width 5.5 mm

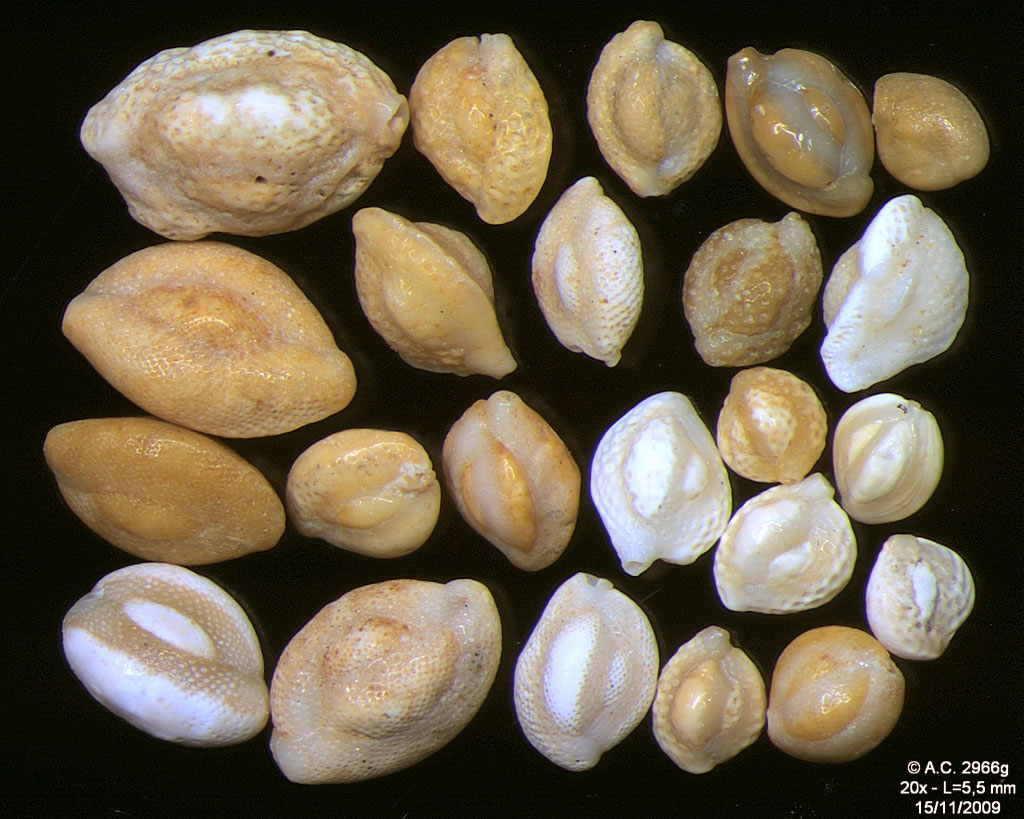
Foraminifera of Indian Ocean, south-eastern coast of Bali, field width 5.5 mm

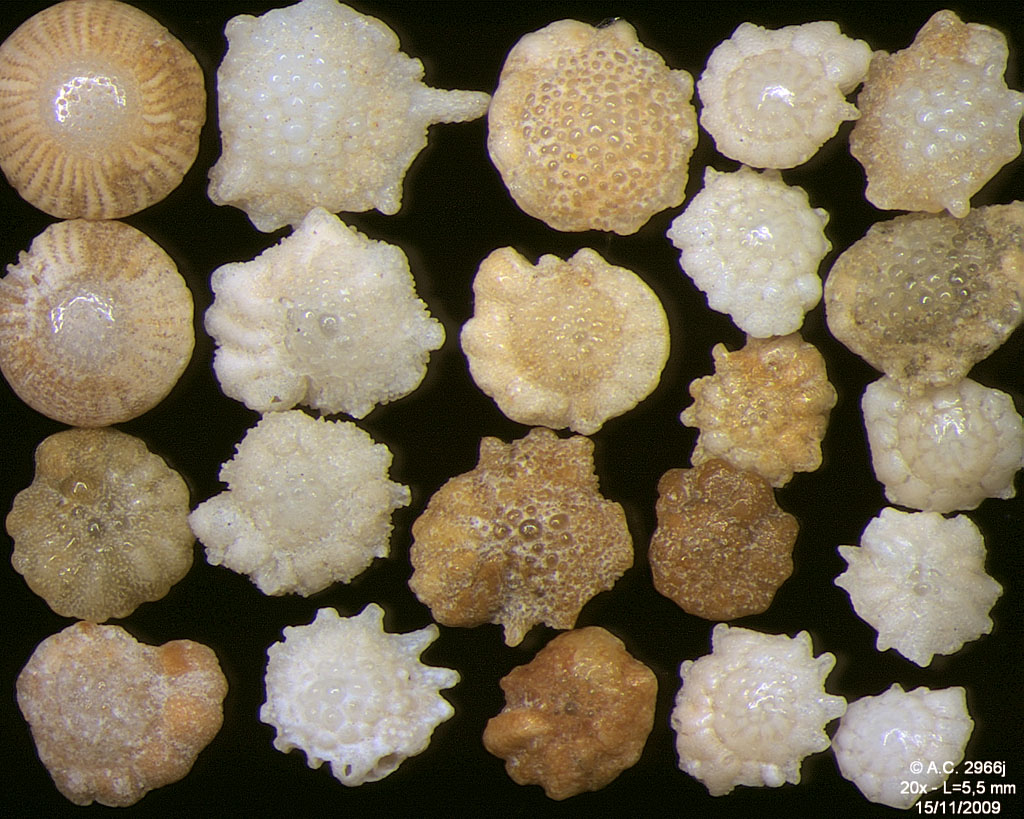
Foraminifera of Indian Ocean, south-eastern coast of Bali, field width 5.5 mm

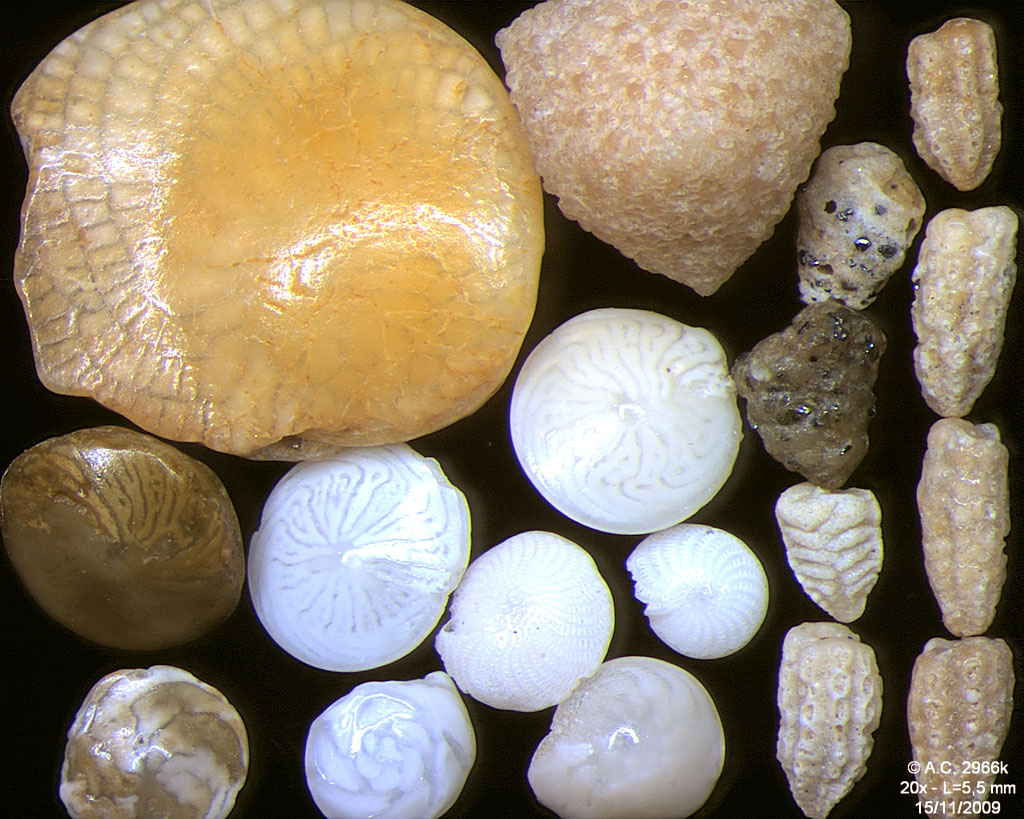
Foraminifera of Indian Ocean, south-eastern coast of Bali, field width 5.5 mm

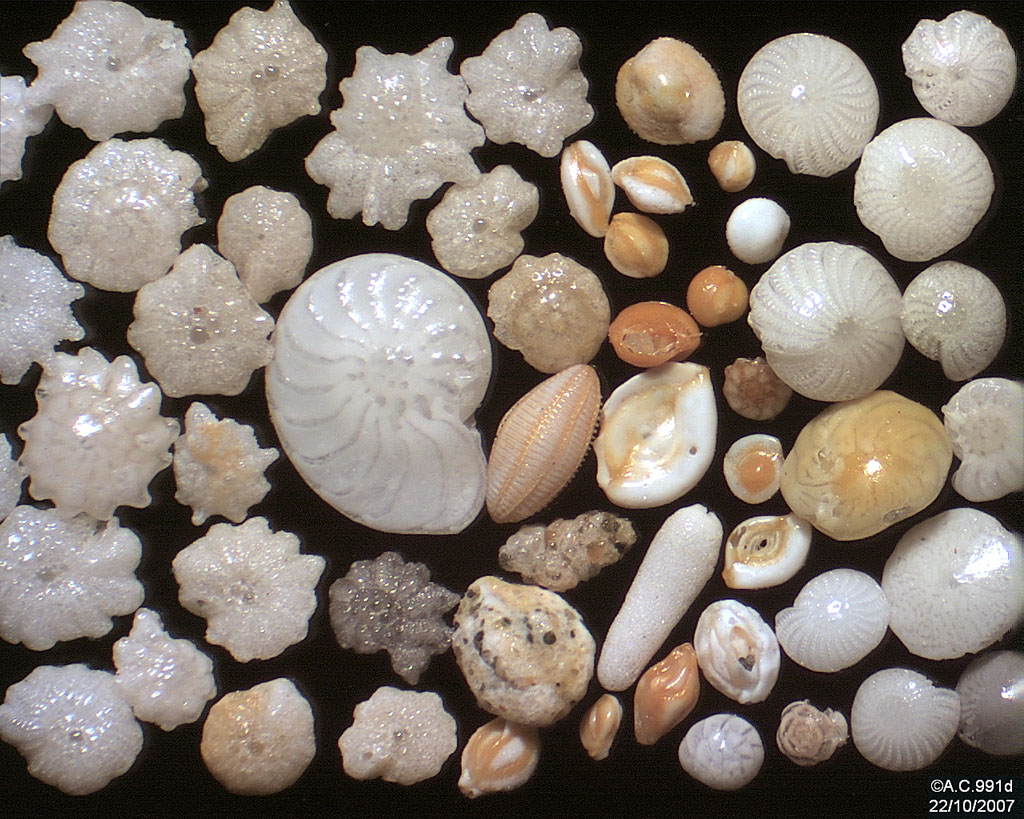
Foraminifera in Ngapali, Myanmar, field width 5.22 mm

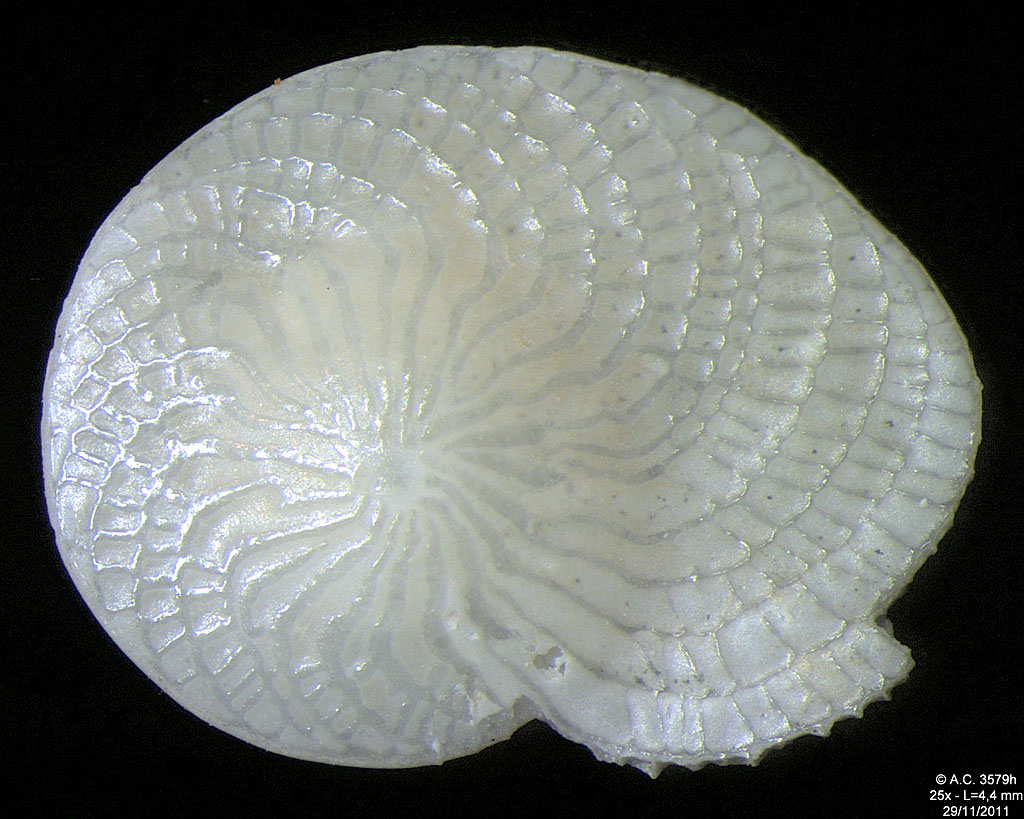
Foraminifera Heterostegina depressa, field width 4.4 mm

== See also ==
- Star sand
