= Spirillinida =

Scientific classification
- Domain: Eukaryota
- Clade: Diaphoretickes
- Clade: SAR
- Clade: Rhizaria
- Phylum: Retaria
- Subphylum: Foraminifera
- Class: Tubothalamea
- Order: Spirillinida; Hohenegger & Piller, 1975

Families
- See text

Order of single-celled organisms

The Spirillinida are an order of foraminifera in which the test, or shell, primitively consists of an enrolled open tube, coming after the proloculus, wound planospirally or conically, commonly composed of an optically single crystal of calcite. The aperture is a simple opening at the end of the tube. Advanced forms with more than one chamber may consist of a few crystals, or rarely, a mosaic of crystals of calcite.

The Spirillinida were separated from the Rotaliida where they had been included as the Spirillinacea. However, not only is the spirillinid test rather distinct from typical rotaliid tests commonly composed of radially laminated calcite, but so are the protists distinct. The gametes produced by spirillinids during sexual reproduction are amoeboid in contrast to the biflagellate gametes produced by most other Foraminifera included rotaliids.

Two living families are recognised. No superfamily has been established. The families are

- Spirillinidae: The test consists of the single, coiled, tubular chamber, after the proluculus, composed of an optically single crystal of calcite. Example Spirillina
- Patellinidae: The test is conical, multichambered, initial chamber after poroluclus tubular, two chambers in each later whorl. Example Patellina
