= Globocassidulina =

Scientific classification
- Domain: Eukaryota
- Clade: Sar
- Clade: Rhizaria
- Phylum: Retaria
- Subphylum: Foraminifera
- Class: Globothalamea
- Order: Rotaliida
- Family: Cassidulinidae
- Subfamily: Cassidulininae
- Genus: Globocassidulina; Voloshinova, 1960

Species
- See text

Synonyms
- Bradynella Saidova, 1975; Bradynella Burmistrova, 1974 (Opinion of Loeblich & Tappan, 1987); Cassidulinitella Saidova, 1975; Cassilongina Voloshinova, 1960 (Opinion of Loeblich & Tappan, 1987); Smyrnella Saidova, 1975; Sphaeroislandiella Saidova, 1975; Sphaeroislandyella Burmistrova, 1974 (Opinion of Loeblich & Tappan, 1987); Spiniferella Saidova, 1975

Genus of single-celled organisms

Globocassidulina is a genus of foraminifera.

Globocassidulina is included in the family Cassidulinidae. Related genera include Cassidulina, Cassidulinella, Favocassidulina and Buriela.

== Species ==
- Globocassidulina algida (Cushman, 1944)
- Globocassidulina arata (Finlay, 1939) †
- Globocassidulina biora (Crespin, 1960)
- Globocassidulina bisecta Nomura, 1983
- Globocassidulina brocha (Poag, 1966)
- Globocassidulina canalisuturata Eade, 1967
- Globocassidulina crassa (d'Orbigny, 1839)
- Globocassidulina cuneata (Finlay, 1940) †
- Globocassidulina decorata (Sidebottom, 1910)
- Globocassidulina depressa (Asano & Nakamura, 1937)
- Globocassidulina dissidens McCulloch, 1977
- Globocassidulina elegans (Sidebottom, 1910)
- Globocassidulina fava (Saidova, 1975)
- Globocassidulina gemma (Todd, 1954)
- Globocassidulina hooperi Clark, 1994
- Globocassidulina ikebei Nishimura et al., 1977
- Globocassidulina jamesoni (McCulloch, 1977)
- Globocassidulina kattoi (Takayanagi, 1953)
- Globocassidulina minima (Saidova, 1975)
- Globocassidulina minuta (Cushman, 1933)
- Globocassidulina mucronata Nomura, 1983
- Globocassidulina murrhyna (Schwager, 1866)
- Globocassidulina murrhyna (Saidova, 1975)
- Globocassidulina neobrocha Nomura, 1983
- Globocassidulina notalnella (Saidova, 1975)
- Globocassidulina oriangulata Belford, 1966
- Globocassidulina paratortuosa (Kuwano, 1954)
- Globocassidulina parva (Asano & Nakamura, 1937)
- Globocassidulina parviapertura Nomura, 1983
- Globocassidulina producta (Chapman & Parr, 1937)
- Globocassidulina pseudocrassa (Hornibrook, 1961) †
- Globocassidulina setanaensis (Asano & Nakamura, 1937)
- Globocassidulina spherica Eade, 1967
- Globocassidulina subglobella (Saidova, 1975)
- Globocassidulina subglobosa (Brady, 1881) (type, as Cassidulina subglobosa)
- Globocassidulina toddi (Saidova, 1975)
- Globocassidulina tumida Heron-Allen & Earland, 1922
- Globocassidulina venustas Nomura, 1983
- Globocassidulina virgata (Saidova, 1975)
