= Cassidulina =

Cassidulina may refer to:

- Cassidulina (foraminifera), a genus in the family Cassidulinidae
- Cassidulina (echinoderm), a superfamily of sea urchins in the order Cassiduloida
