= Globocassidulina elegans =

Scientific classification
- Domain: Eukaryota
- Clade: Sar
- Clade: Rhizaria
- Phylum: Retaria
- Subphylum: Foraminifera
- Class: Globothalamea
- Order: Rotaliida
- Family: Cassidulinidae
- Genus: Globocassidulina
- Species: G. elegans

Binomial name
- Globocassidulina elegans (Sidebottom, 1910)

Synonyms
- Cassidulina elegans Sidebottom, 1910; Islandiella elegans (Sidebottom, 1910)

Species of single-celled organism

Globocassidulina elegans is a species of foraminifera. It is a marine species found in the Japanese and New Zealand Exclusive Economic Zones.
