= Pullenia =

Pullenia may refer to:

- Pullenia (plant), a genus of flowering plants in the family Fabaceae
- Pullenia (foraminifera), a genus of foraminifers in the family Nonionidae
