= Cassidulus infidus =

Scientific classification
- Kingdom: Animalia
- Phylum: Echinodermata
- Class: Echinoidea
- Order: Cassiduloida
- Family: Cassidulidae
- Genus: Cassidulus
- Species: C. infidus

Binomial name
- Cassidulus infidus Mortensen, 1948

Species of sea urchin

Cassidulus infidus is a species of sea urchin of the family Cassidulidae. Their armour is covered with spines. Cassidulus infidus was first scientifically described in 1948 by Ole Theodor Jensen Mortensen.
