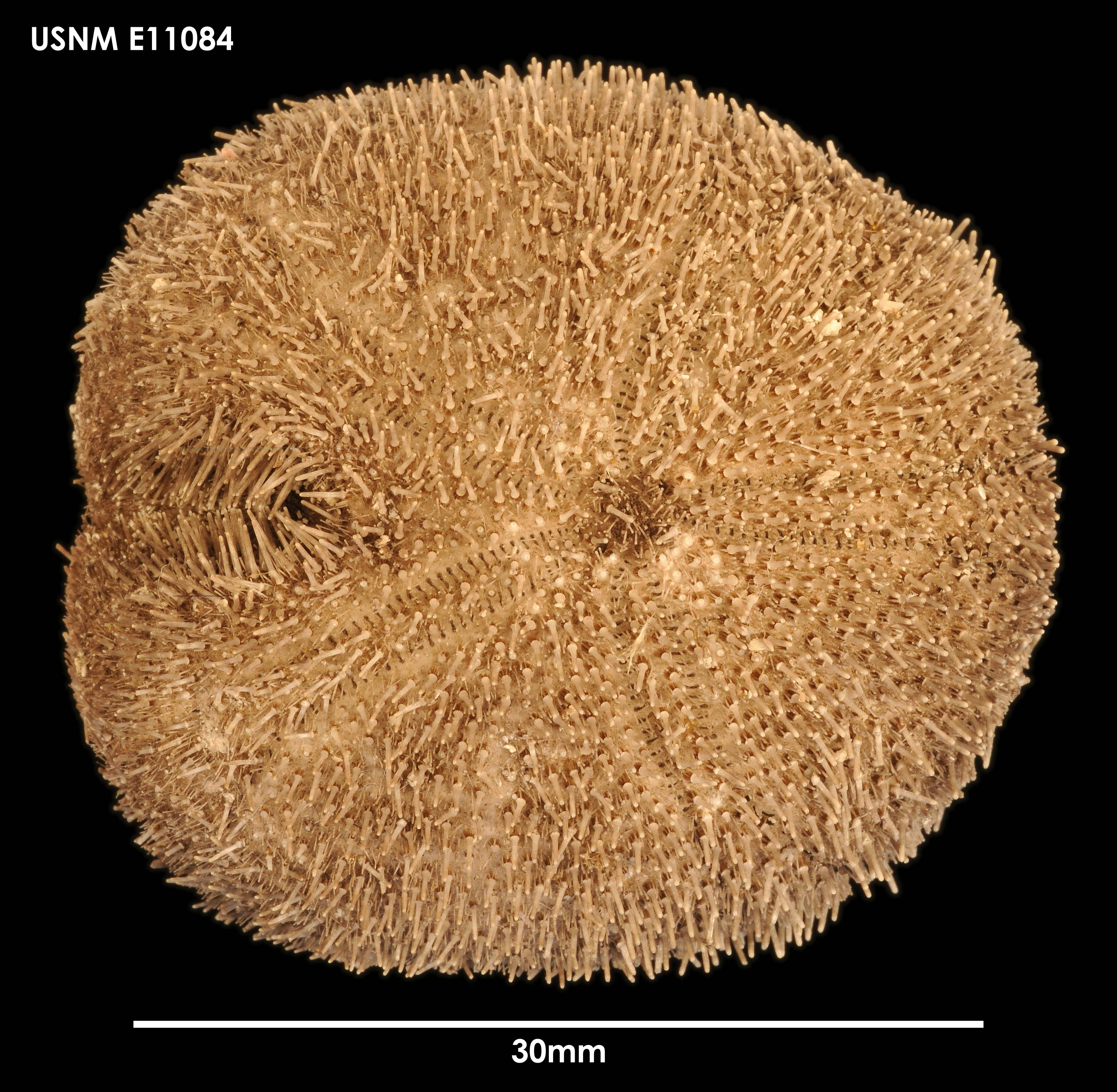

Scientific classification
- Domain: Eukaryota
- Kingdom: Animalia
- Phylum: Echinodermata
- Class: Echinoidea
- Order: Cassiduloida
- Family: Apatopygidae
- Genus: Apatopygus
- Species: A. recens

Binomial name
- Apatopygus recens (Milne-Edwards, 1836)

= Apatopygus recens =

Species of sea urchin

Apatopygus recens is a species of sea urchin of the family Apatopygidae. Their armour is covered with spines. It is placed in the genus Apatopygus and lives in the sea. Apatopygus recens was first scientifically described in 1836 by Milne-Edwards, French zoologist.
