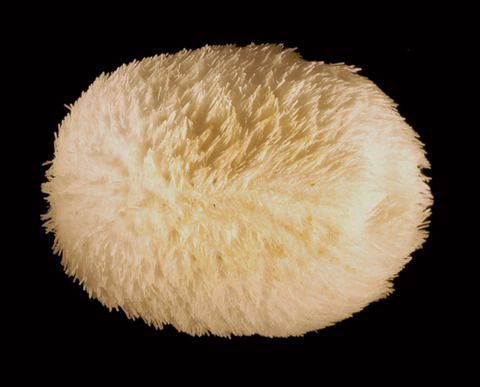
- Preserved specimen at the Peabody Museum of Natural History originally found at Loblolly Bay, Anegada, British Virgin Islands

Scientific classification
- Kingdom: Animalia
- Phylum: Echinodermata
- Class: Echinoidea
- Order: Cassiduloida
- Family: Cassidulidae
- Genus: Cassidulus
- Species: C. caribaearum

Binomial name
- Cassidulus caribaearum Lamarck, 1801

= Cassidulus caribaearum =

Species of sea urchin

Cassidulus caribaearum is a species of sea urchins of the family Cassidulidae. Their armour is covered with spines. Cassidulus caribaearum was first scientifically described in 1801 by Jean-Baptiste de Lamarck.
