= Aphanopora echinobrissoides =

Scientific classification
- Kingdom: Animalia
- Phylum: Echinodermata
- Class: Echinoidea
- Order: Cassiduloida
- Family: Neolampadidae
- Genus: Aphanopora
- Species: A. echinobrissoides

Binomial name
- Aphanopora echinobrissoides (de Meijere, 1903)

Species of sea urchin

Aphanopora echinobrissoides is a species of sea urchin of the family Neolampadidae. Their armour is covered with spines. It is placed in the genus Aphanopora and lives in the sea. Aphanopora echinobrissoides was first scientifically described in 1903 by de Meijere. It is considered a deep sea organism.
