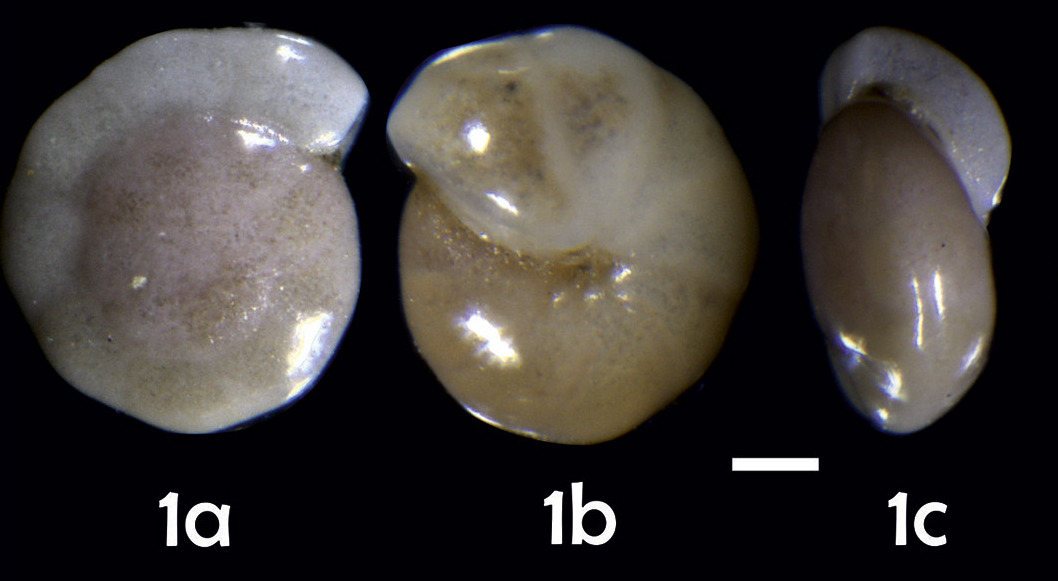
- Gyroidina orbicularis

Scientific classification
- Domain: Eukaryota
- Clade: Sar
- Clade: Rhizaria
- Phylum: Retaria
- Subphylum: Foraminifera
- Class: Globothalamea
- Order: Rotaliida
- Family: Gavelinellidae
- Subfamily: Gavelinellinae
- Genus: Gyroidina d'Orbigny, 1826

= Gyroidina =

Gyroidina Temporal range: Holocene

Genus of single-celled organisms

Gyroidina is a genus of foraminifera belonging to the family Gavelinellidae of the superfamily Chilostomelloidea and the order Rotaliida. Its temporal range is the Holocene.

== Species ==
Species in Gyroidina include:

- †Gyroidina aegyptiaca
- †Gyroidina akkeshiensis
- †Gyroidina alabamensis
- †Gyroidina alticamerata
- Gyroidina altiformis
- †Gyroidina angustiumbilicata
- †Gyroidina anomalinoides
- Gyroidina antarctica
- †Gyroidina arkadelphiana
- Gyroidina asymmetrica
- †Gyroidina babicensis
- †Gyroidina barbarica
- †Gyroidina basicrassata
- †Gyroidina beisseli
- †Gyroidina borislavensis
- †Gyroidina brockerti
- †Gyroidina bukalovae
- †Gyroidina byramensis
- Gyroidina carinata
- Gyroidina carmenensi
- †Gyroidina cetera
- Gyroidina chathamensis
- †Gyroidina childsi
- †Gyroidina chirana
- †Gyroidina cibaoensis
- †Gyroidina clodiusi
- Gyroidina colombiaensis
- †Gyroidina comma
- †Gyroidina complanata
- †Gyroidina condoni
- †Gyroidina conica
- Gyroidina contecta
- †Gyroidina cretosa
- †Gyroidina crystalriverensis
- Gyroidina cushmani
- †Gyroidina delicata
- †Gyroidina depressa
- †Gyroidina depressaeformis
- †Gyroidina dissimilis
- †Gyroidina eggeri
- †Gyroidina elongata
- †Gyroidina exserta
- Gyroidina flavescens
- Gyroidina gemma
- †Gyroidina gothica
- Gyroidina guadalupensis
- †Gyroidina guayabalensis
- †Gyroidina hamiltoni
- †Gyroidina hangukensis
- †Gyroidina infrafosa
- Gyroidina io
- †Gyroidina iojimaensis
- †Gyroidina jarvisi
- †Gyroidina jenkinsi
- †Gyroidina kasahstanica
- Gyroidina kawagatai
- †Gyroidina kazusaense
- †Gyroidina keenani
- †Gyroidina komatsui
- †Gyroidina laciniata
- Gyroidina laevigata
- Gyroidina lamarckiana
- Gyroidina lenticularis
- †Gyroidina limbata
- †Gyroidina loetterlei
- Gyroidina longispira
- †Gyroidina lottensis
- †Gyroidina madrugaensis
- †Gyroidina marina
- †Gyroidina marylandica
- †Gyroidina maudryae
- †Gyroidina mauretanica
- Gyroidina mauryae
- †Gyroidina medicea
- †Gyroidina mendezensis
- †Gyroidina minuta
- †Gyroidina moskvini
- †Gyroidina nana
- †Gyroidina nassauensis
- Gyroidina neorotunda
- Gyroidina neosoldanii
- †Gyroidina nitidaformis
- Gyroidina nitidula
- †Gyroidina noda
- †Gyroidina obesa
- †Gyroidina octocamerata
- Gyroidina orbicularis
- †Gyroidina parva
- †Gyroidina patagonica
- Gyroidina pilasensis
- †Gyroidina planulata
- Gyroidina polia
- Gyroidina politula
- †Gyroidina praeglobosa
- †Gyroidina praemegastoma
- †Gyroidina profunda
- †Gyroidina pudica
- †Gyroidina punctata
- Gyroidina quinqueloba
- †Gyroidina relizana
- †Gyroidina reussi
- Gyroidina rothwelli
- †Gyroidina rotunda
- †Gyroidina sakasegawaensis
- †Gyroidina scalata
- †Gyroidina scita
- †Gyroidina simiensis
- †Gyroidina sokolovae
- †Gyroidina sparksi
- †Gyroidina springfieldensis
- †Gyroidina stellifera
- Gyroidina subplanulata
- Gyroidina subsoldanii
- †Gyroidina suturalis
- †Gyroidina tainanensis
- †Gyroidina tayyabi
- †Gyroidina tendami
- †Gyroidina tokachiensis
- †Gyroidina torulus
- †Gyroidina tricherasensis
- Gyroidina tropica
- †Gyroidina tsablensis
- †Gyroidina turgida
- Gyroidina umbilicata
- Gyroidina umbonata
- †Gyroidina urahoroensis
- †Gyroidina vicksburgensis
- †Gyroidina vortex
- †Gyroidina wellmani
- †Gyroidina wengeri

Several species that were formerly in Gyroidina have been placed in the genus Gyroidinoides.
