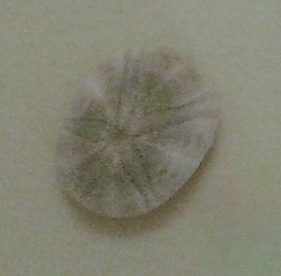

Scientific classification
- Kingdom: Animalia
- Phylum: Echinodermata
- Class: Echinoidea
- Order: Cassiduloida
- Family: Cassidulidae
- Genus: Cassidulus
- Species: C. mitis

Binomial name
- Cassidulus mitis Krau, 1954

= Cassidulus mitis =

Species of sea urchin

Cassidulus mitis is a species of sea urchin of the family Cassidulidae. Their armour is covered with spines. Cassidulus mitis was first scientifically described in 1954 by Krau.
