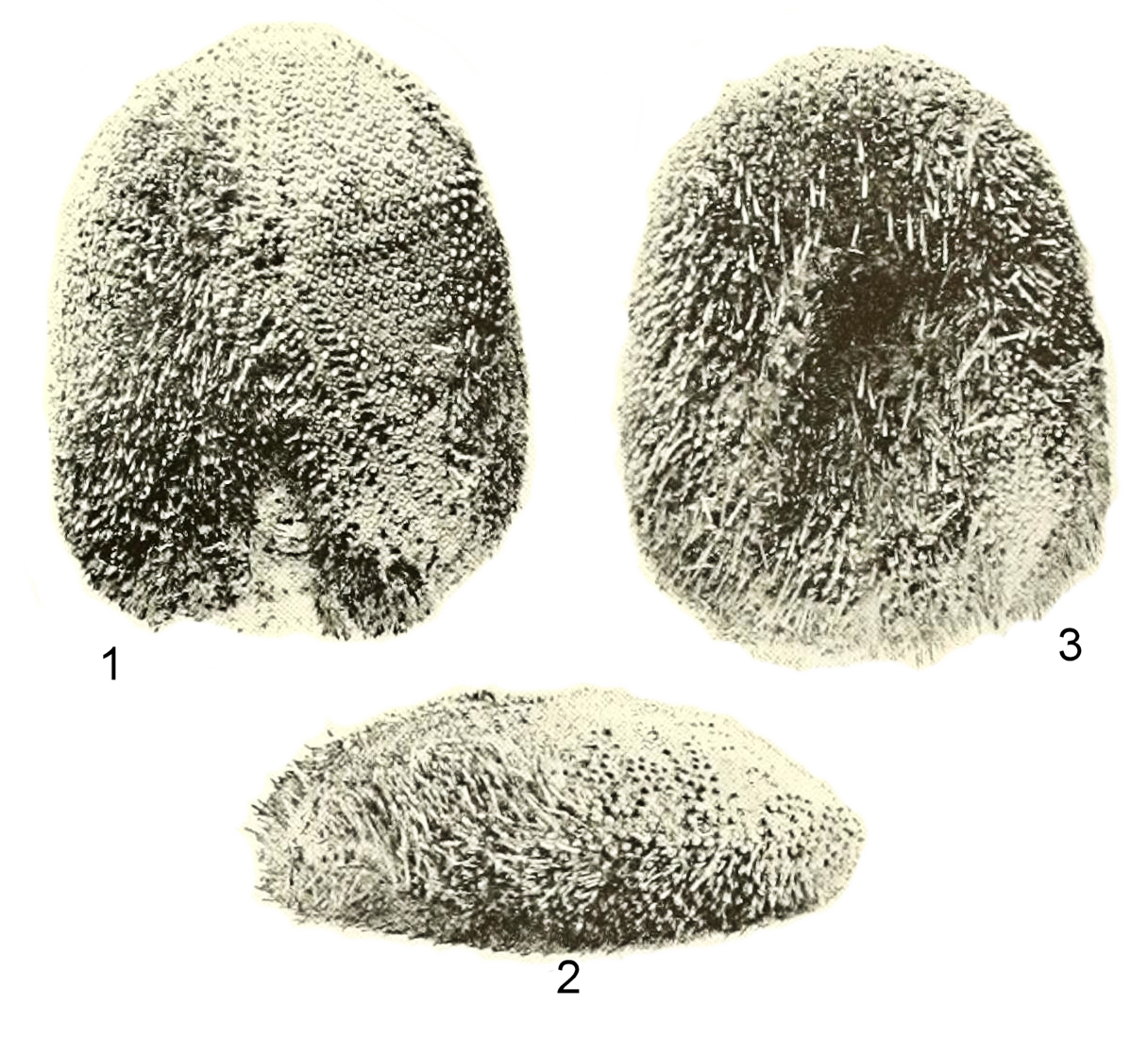

Scientific classification
- Domain: Eukaryota
- Kingdom: Animalia
- Phylum: Echinodermata
- Class: Echinoidea
- Order: Cassiduloida
- Family: Apatopygidae
- Genus: Apatopygus
- Species: A. occidentalis

Binomial name
- Apatopygus occidentalis (Clark, 1928)

= Apatopygus occidentalis =

Species of sea urchin

Apatopygus occidentalis is a species of sea urchin of the family Apatopygidae. Their armour is covered with spines. It is placed in the genus Apatopygus and lives in the sea. Apatopygus occidentalis was first scientifically described in 1928 by Hubert Lyman Clark, American zoologist.
