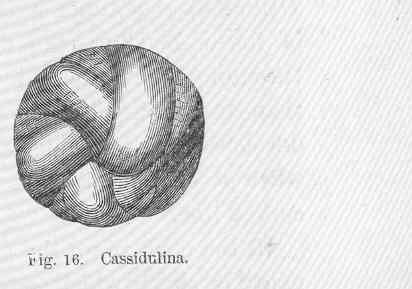

Scientific classification
- Domain: Eukaryota
- Clade: Sar
- Clade: Rhizaria
- Phylum: Retaria
- Subphylum: Foraminifera
- Class: Globothalamea
- Order: Rotaliida
- Family: Cassidulinidae
- Subfamily: Cassidulininae
- Genus: Cassidulina d'Orbigny, 1826

Species
- See text

= Cassidulina (foraminifera) =

Cassidulina Temporal range: U Eocene to Recent

Genus of foraminifers

Cassidulina is a genus of foraminifera described in the Treatise Part C. (Loeblich & Tappan, 1964), as having a free, lenticular test, with central boss of clear calcite on either side. Chambers are biserially arranged, enrolled planispirally with a subangular to keeled periphery. The wall is calcareous, hyaline (glassy), optically granular, perforate. The surface is smooth with a polished appearance. Sutures are radial to oblique, straight or curved. The aperture is a narrow arched slip at the base of the apertural face, partly closed by an apertural place. (Loeblich and Tappan 1988)

The taxonomy of Cassidulina is rather stable, and is included in the Cassidulinidae at least as far back as Cushman, 1950. Related genera include Cassidulinella, Favocassidulina, Globocassidulina, and Buriela. Cassidulina, itself, is cosmopolitan, with a stratigraphic range extending from the Upper Eocene to recent.

== Species ==
- Cassidulina albemariensis McCulloch, 1977
- Cassidulina alternans Yabe & Hanzawa, 1925
- Cassidulina asanoi Uchio, 1950
- Cassidulina bradshawi Uchio, 1960
- Cassidulina braziliensis Cushman, 1922
- Cassidulina caledoniana McCulloch, 1981
- Cassidulina carapitana Hedberg, 1937 †
- Cassidulina carinata Silvestri, 1896
- Cassidulina costatula Cushman, 1933
- Cassidulina cretacea Cushman, 1931
- Cassidulina crustosa Saidova, 1975
- Cassidulina curvata Phleger & Parker, 1951
- Cassidulina curvatiformis McCulloch, 1977
- Cassidulina cushmani R.E. & K.C. Stewart, 1930
- Cassidulina deafueraensis McCulloch, 1977
- Cassidulina delicatiformis (McCulloch, 1977)
- Cassidulina detierraensis McCulloch, 1977
- Cassidulina differens McCulloch, 1977
- Cassidulina elegantissima Cushman, 1925
- Cassidulina globosa Hantken, 1865
- Cassidulina hoodensis McCulloch, 1977
- Cassidulina inflatiformis McCulloch, 1977
- Cassidulina insueta Cushman, 1947
- Cassidulina izuensis Aoki, 1967
- Cassidulina kasiwazakiensis Husezima & Maruhasi, 1944
- Cassidulina laevigata d'Orbigny, 1826
- Cassidulina limbata Cushman & Hughes, 1925
- Cassidulina lineocorrugata McCulloch, 1977
- Cassidulina lobulata McCulloch, 1977
- Cassidulina lomitensis Galloway & Wissler, 1927
- Cassidulina margareta Karrer, 1877 †
- Cassidulina marshallana Todd, 1954
- Cassidulina moluccensis Germeraad, 1946
- Cassidulina monicaniformis McCulloch, 1977
- Cassidulina monstruosa Voloshinova, 1952 †
- Cassidulina neoteretis Seidenkrantz, 1995
- Cassidulina norvangi Thalmann, 1952
- Cassidulina obtusa Williamson, 1858
- Cassidulina oshimai Aoki, 1967
- Cassidulina palmerae Bermúdez & Acosta, 1940
- Cassidulina patula Cushman, 1933
- Cassidulina penangensis McCulloch, 1977
- Cassidulina perumbonata Keyzer, 1953
- Cassidulina pilasensis McCulloch, 1977
- Cassidulina planata Saidova, 1975
- Cassidulina planulata McCulloch, 1977
- Cassidulina pulchella d'Orbigny, 1839
- Cassidulina quadrata Cushman & Hughes, 1925
- Cassidulina radiata Chave, 1987
- Cassidulina rarilocula Cushman, 1933
- Cassidulina reniforme Nørvangi, 1945
- Cassidulina seca McCulloch, 1977
- Cassidulina simpsonsbayensis McCulloch, 1977
- Cassidulina spiniferiformis McCulloch, 1977
- Cassidulina spiralis Natland, 1938
- Cassidulina striatostoma Zheng, 1979
- Cassidulina subcalifornica Drooger, 1953
- Cassidulina subcarinata Uchio, 1960
- Cassidulina sublaevigata Hofker, 1956
- Cassidulina sublimbata Asano & Nakamura, 1937
- Cassidulina subtumida Cushman, 1933
- Cassidulina teretis Tappan, 1951
- Cassidulina tortuosa Cushman & Hughes, 1925
- Cassidulina translucens Cushman & Hughes, 1925
- Cassidulina tumida Natland, 1938
- Cassidulina velaensis McCulloch, 1981
- Cassidulina victoriensis Collins, 1974
- Cassidulina vulgata McCulloch, 1977
- Cassidulina wakasaensis Asano & Nakamura, 1937
- Cassidulina weinmanensis McCulloch, 1977
- Cassidulina wordeni McCulloch, 1977
- Cassidulina wrangellensis McCulloch, 1977
- Cassidulina yabei Asano & Nakamura, 1937
