= Amphistegina =

Amphistegina Temporal range: Eocene - Recent
- Amphistegina gibbosa

Scientific classification
- Domain: Eukaryota
- Clade: Sar
- Clade: Rhizaria
- Phylum: Foraminifera
- Class: Globothalamea
- Order: Rotaliida
- Family: Amphisteginidae
- Genus: Amphistegina d'Orbigny, 1826

Genus of single-celled organisms

Amphistegina is a genus of foraminiferal protists included in the Rotaliida with a stratigraphic range extending from the Eocene to recent and a cosmopolitan distribution. The test is an asymmetrically biconvex trochospiral that may be bi-involute or partially evolute on the spiral side. Chambers are numerous, broad. and low, strongly curved back at the periphery to form chamber prolongations. The umbilical side is stellate, like that of Asterigerina, and has a distinct umbilical plug. The wall is calcareous, optically radial; the surface finely perforate and smooth overall. The periphery angular to carinate (keeled); the aperture an interiomarginal slit on the umbilical side, bordered by a lip.

Loeblich and Tappan, 1964 included Amphistegina in the Amphisteginidae along with related Boreloides, Eoconuloides, and Tremastegina; the Amphisteginidae at that time included in the Orbitoidoidea, the Asterigerinidae in the Discorboidea.

Amphistegina prefers warm and shallow water (less than 30 m) and mainly inhabits the seafloor between the coastline and coral reefs. Also, the test is quite hard compared with many other more fragile foram tests which allows them to survive in wave agitated water.
