= Cassidulus delectus =

Scientific classification
- Kingdom: Animalia
- Phylum: Echinodermata
- Class: Echinoidea
- Order: Cassiduloida
- Family: Cassidulidae
- Genus: Cassidulus
- Species: C. delectus

Binomial name
- Cassidulus delectus Krau, 1960

Species of sea urchin

Cassidulus delectus is a species of sea urchin of the family Cassidulidae. Their armour is covered with spines. Cassidulus delectus was first scientifically described in 1960 by Krau.
