= Discorboidea =

Discorboidea Temporal range: Middle Triassic–Recent

Scientific classification
- Domain: Eukaryota
- Clade: Sar
- Clade: Rhizaria
- Phylum: Retaria
- Subphylum: Foraminifera
- Class: Globothalamea
- Order: Rotaliida
- Superfamily: Discorboidea; Ehrenberg, 1838

Families
- See text

Superfamily of single-celled organisms

Discorboidea, or Discorbacea in older taxonomies, is a superfamily of foraminifera, (testate protists), with a range extending from the Middle Triassic to the present, characterized by chambers arranged in a low trochospiral; an umbilical or interiomarginal aperture, with or without supplementary apertures; and a wall structure that is optically radial.

Eight families are currently recognized, further characterized here in.

- Discorbidae – Discorboidea in which each chamber is partly divided by an imperforate wall and the umbilical area is partly covered by chamber extensions. Discorbis, Neoeponides
- Bagginidae – Discorboidea with an overall finely perforate test, but imperforate in a part of ventral side Baggina, Cancris
- Eponididae – in which the aperture is interiomarginal and slit-like (or a narrow arch) or areal and cribrate. Eponides, Joanella, Paumotua, Poroeponides
- Heleninidae – in which the primary aperture is interiomarginal and secondary apertures are sutural Helenina
- Misissippinidae – have distinct, translucent or opaque bands near the periphery on one or both sides; Mississippina, Stomatorbina
- Pegidiidae – in which coiling is a modified trochospiral, with resorbed early chambers and apertures are open ends of tubes on the ventral side Pegidia
- Rotalinidae – have simple chamber interiors, an umbilicus partly covered by chamber extensions or closed, and an aperture that is a low interiomarginal arch. Gavellinopsis, Nevconorbina, Rosalina
- Sphaeroidinidae – Discorboidea with strongly overlapping chambers, arranged trochospirally or in different planes; and single slit-like or multiple apertures. Sphaeroidina

Two other families were included, the Asterigerinidae and Epistomariidae, which have been removed to the Asterigerinoidea. Some now included families such as the Bagginidae were once defined as a subfamily, the Bagginindae, based on the genus Baggina, in the Discorbidae. As a result the discorbid subfamily Discorbine became the present Discorbidae. The Pegidiidae, originally the rotaliitid subfamily Pegidiinae was removed from the Rotalioidea and added to the Discorboidea as a family. Helenina, a genus in the Discorbinae, became the type for its own family, the Heleninidae. Finally the Eponididae was once included in the Orbitoidoidea before being made part of the Discorboidea.
