= Elphidium williamsoni =

Scientific classification
- Domain: Eukaryota
- Clade: Sar
- Clade: Rhizaria
- Phylum: Foraminifera
- Class: Globothalamea
- Order: Rotaliida
- Family: Elphidiinae
- Genus: Elphidium
- Species: E. williamsoni

Binomial name
- Elphidium williamsoni Haynes, 1973

Synonyms
- Cribroelphidium williamsoni (Haynes, 1973); Elphidium excavatum subsp. williamsoni Haynes, 1973; Elphidium longipontis Stschedrina, 1962

Species of single-celled organism

Elphidium williamsoni is a species of foraminiferans belonging to the family Elphidiidae. Elphidium williamsoni is found in abundance around the coasts of the UK, predominantly in the lower end of the coast.

== See also ==
- List of prehistoric foraminiferans
