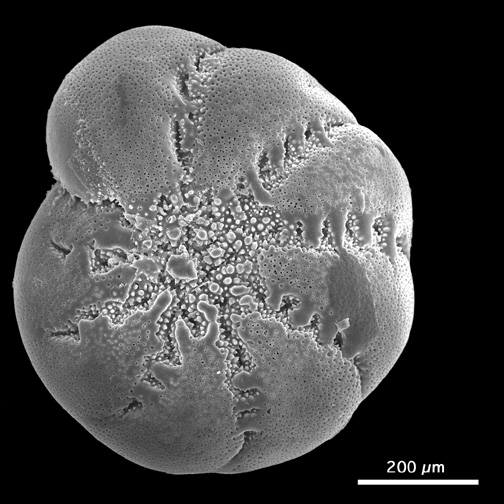
- Elphidium excavatum clavatum

Scientific classification
- Domain: Eukaryota
- Clade: Diaphoretickes
- Clade: Sar
- Clade: Rhizaria
- Phylum: Retaria
- Subphylum: Foraminifera
- Class: Globothalamea
- Order: Rotaliida
- Family: Elphidiinae
- Genus: Elphidium; Montfort, 1808

Species
- See text

Synonyms
- Andromedes Montfort, 1808 (Opinion of Loeblich & Tappan, 1987); Canalifera Krasheninnikov, 1953 (Name not available ICZN Art. 13(a)(i)); Carpenterella Krasheninnikov, 1953 (Opinion of Loeblich & Tappan, 1987); Cellanthus Montfort, 1808; Cellulia Agassiz, 1844 (Opinion of Loeblich & Tappan, 1987, err. emend.); Cribrononion Thalmann, 1947· accepted, alternate representation; Faujasinella Voloshinova, 1958 (Subjective junior synonym in opinion of Loeblich & Tappan, 1987); Geophonus Montfort, 1808 (Opinion of Loeblich & Tappan, 1987); Helicoza Mobius, 1880 (Opinion of Loeblich & Tappan, 1987); Helicoza Möbius, 1880 (Opinion of Loeblich & Tappan, 1987); Nonion (Cribrononion) Thalmann, 1947 (Opinion of Loeblich & Tappan, 1987); Ozawaia Cushman, 1931 (Junior subjective synonym in opinion of Hayward et al. (1997)); Perfectononion Voloshinova & Leonenko, 1970 (Opinion of Loeblich & Tappan, 1987); Planoelphidium Voloshinova, 1958 (Opinion of Loeblich & Tappan, 1987); Polystomatium Ehrenberg, 1839 (Opinion of Loeblich & Tappan, 1987); Polystomella Lamarck, 1822 (Subjective junior synonym Opinion of Loeblich and Tappan (1987)); Sporilus Montfort, 1808 (Opinion of Loeblich & Tappan, 1987); Themeon Montfort, 1808 (Opinion of Loeblich & Tappan, 1987); Vorticialis Lamarck, 1812 (Opinion of Loeblich & Tappan, 1987)

= Elphidium =

Elphidium Temporal range: Early Eocene to Holocene

Genus of foraminifers

Elphidium is an abundant genus of foraminifera. Species can be found from coastal regions out to the continental slope, and in all temperature ranges. Like other forams, fossils from different species are used to date rocks. The taxonomy of the species within this genus is disputed due to the high variability of some species.

== Description ==
Elphidium is generally around 1 mm in size. The test is spiral-shaped, and can be red, orange, or brown. This shell is made up of calcium carbonate. Species of this genus have seven to twenty chambers in the final whorl, and may have an umbilical plug on each side. In some species the rim is sharp, while in others it is more rounded. Another distinctive feature is the retral processes (small backward extensions of the chamber walls) that cross the sutures, giving some the appearance of tiny rolled up glass baskets. Elphidium crawls using a type of pseudopod called reticulopodia.

== Life cycle ==
Elphidium shows dimorphism with alternating generations. The complete cycle for Elphidium crispum takes two years in the shallower marine regions, although it may be delayed at deeper stations. Asexual reproduction reaches a peak in spring of the first year. Sexual reproduction begins early in the second spring as temperatures begin to rise. The gametes conjugate outside in open sea to produce zygotes and the B form then develops and matures during the second summer. Lister (1895) observed Elphidium in two different forms as megalospheric form (sexual form) and microspheric form (asexual form). The megalospheric form was developed from the microspheric form. The gametes which gives rise to microspheric form by syngamy. Elphidium exhibits an alternation of generation in its life cycle. The megalospheric forms alternates with microspheric forms. The microspheric forms are developed by the conjugation or syngamy. It means there is always an alternations of asexual (microspheric) and sexual (megalospheric) generation in Elphidium. The microspheric form reproduces asexually by fission to produce a number of amoebulae. The inner cytoplasm mass containing several nuclei creeps out of the shell and remains as a lump around it. A small amount of cytoplasm collects around each nucleus. As a result, a large number of amoeboid cells are formed. Each amoebula secretes the proloculus, forms rhizopodia, then it grows and forms other chambers of the shell to become a megalospheric forms. The megalospheric form reproduces sexually by syngamy or conjugation. During sexual reproduction in megalospheric forms, nucleus first breaks up into many small nuclei and the cytoplasm collects around each of these nuclei. The nuclei divide twice giving rise to a large haploid and known as isogametes. Isogametes of two different individuals fuse in pairs to form zygotes. These are then develops into microspheric form. The life cycle of Elphidium may be summarized as follows: the microspheric forms produce amoebulae by asexual fission which develops into megalospheric forms. The megalospheric forms produce flagellated isogametes which after syngamy produce zygotes that develop into microspheric forms. Thus, its life cycle clearly exhibits the phenomenon of alternations of asexual microspheric generations with sexual megalospheric generations.

== Subdivisions ==
- Subgenus Elphidium (Parrellina) Carter, 1958
  - †Elphidium (Parrellina) centrifugalis Carter, 1958
- Subgenus Elphidium (Polystomella) Heron-Allen & Earland, 1932
- Elphidium incertae sedis
  - Elphidium abyssicola Ishiwada, 1964
  - Elphidium aculeatum (d'Orbigny, 1846)
  - †Elphidium adelaidense Howchin & Parr, 1938
  - Elphidium advenum (Cushman, 1922)
  - †Elphidium africanum LeRoy, 1953
  - †Elphidium aguafrescaense Todd & Kniker, 1952
  - Elphidium alaskense Cushman & Todd, 1947
  - Elphidium albanii Hayward, 1997 in Hayward, Hollis & Grenfell, 1997
  - Elphidium alvarezianum (d'Orbigny, 1839)
  - †Elphidium ancestrum Le Calvez, 1950
  - Elphidium argenteum Parr, 1945
  - †Elphidium armenium Saakyan-Gezalyan, 1957
  - Elphidium articulatum (d'Orbigny, 1839)
  - †Elphidium asagaiense Asano, 1949
  - †Elphidium asanoi Kaiho, 1984
  - †Elphidium asanoi Matsunaga, 1963
  - Elphidium asiaticum Polski, 1959
  - Elphidium asklundi Brotzen, 1943
  - †Elphidium australis Cushman & Parker, 1931
  - †Elphidium azerbaidjanicum Mamedova, 1966
  - †Elphidium aznaburticum Pronina, 1964
  - Elphidium bartletti Cushman, 1933
  - Elphidium batavum Hofker, 1968
  - Elphidium batialis Saidova, 1961
  - †Elphidium bhattacharyai Jauhri, 1994
  - Elphidium biperforatus (Whittaker & Hodgkinson, 1979)
  - †Elphidium bogdanowiczi Pronina, 1964
  - Elphidium bosoense Fujita, 1956
  - Elphidium botaniense Albani, 1981
  - †Elphidium brooklynense Shupack, 1934
  - †Elphidium californicum Cook Ms., 1959
  - Elphidium capelavelaense McCulloch, 1981
  - †Elphidium carenerosensis Bermúdez & Fuenmayor, 1966
  - †Elphidium cariacoense Bermúdez & Seiglie, 1963
  - Elphidium carpentariaense Albani & Yassini, 1993
  - Elphidium carteri Hayward, 1997 in Hayward, Hollis & Grenfell, 1997
  - †Elphidium cercadense Bermúdez, 1949
  - †Elphidium chapmani Cushman, 1936
  - Elphidium charlottense (Vella, 1957)
  - †Elphidium cherifi Anan, 2010
  - †Elphidium chilenum Todd & Kniker, 1952
  - †Elphidium clarki Graham, 1950
  - †Elphidium clavatum Cushman Em. Loeblich & Tappan, 1953
  - Elphidium cochense McCulloch, 1981
  - Elphidium collinsi Hayward, 1997 in Hayward, Hollis & Grenfell, 1997
  - Elphidium colomboense McCulloch, 1977
  - †Elphidium colomi Ferrer, 1971
  - Elphidium complanatum (d'Orbigny, 1839)
  - †Elphidium compressulum Copeland, 1964
  - †Elphidium concinnum Khalilov, 1957
  - †Elphidium concinnum Nicol, 1944
  - †Elphidium consociatum Khalilov, 1957
  - †Elphidium costiferum (Terquem, 1882)
  - †Elphidium crassatum Cushman, 1936
  - Elphidium crassimargo Shchedrina, 1984
  - Elphidium craticulatum (Fichtel & Moll, 1798)
  - †Elphidium crespinae Cushman, 1936
  - Elphidium crispum (Linnaeus, 1758)
  - Elphidium cristobalense McCulloch, 1981
  - Elphidium cubaguaense McCulloch, 1981
  - †Elphidium culebrense Cushman, 1936
  - Elphidium cuvillieri Levy, 1966
  - †Elphidium cynicalis Jennings, 1936
  - Elphidium decipiens (O.G.Costa, 1856)
  - †Elphidium decorum Qiu & Lin, 1978
  - †Elphidium deferrariisi Malumián, 1990
  - Elphidium delicatulum Bermúdez, 1949
  - Elphidium discoidale (d'Orbigny, 1839)
  - †Elphidium dominicense Bermúdez, 1949
  - †Elphidium dopperti Daniels, 2001
  - †Elphidium duzdagicum Pronina, 1964
  - Elphidium earlandi Cushman, 1936
  - †Elphidium echinus Serova, 1955
  - †Elphidium elegans Serova, 1955
  - Elphidium elegantum (Hofker, 1976)
  - †Elphidium ellisi Weiss, 1954
  - †Elphidium eocenicum Cushman & Ellisor, 1931
  - Elphidium excubitor Nicol, 1944
  - Elphidium exoticum Haynes, 1973
  - †Elphidium ezoense Asano, 1937
  - †Elphidium fastigiatum Cushman, 1945
  - Elphidium fax Nicol, 1944
  - †Elphidium fedorowi Bogdanovich, 1960
  - †Elphidium felsense Papp, 1963
  - †Elphidium ferrentegranulum Krasheninnikov, 1960
  - Elphidium fichtelianum (d'Orbigny, 1846)
  - Elphidium fijiense Hayward, 1997 in Hayward, Hollis & Grenfell, 1997
  - Elphidium fimbriatulum (Cushman, 1918)
  - †Elphidium fissurisuturalum Wang, He & Lu, 1988
  - †Elphidium flexuosum (d'Orbigny, 1846)
  - †Elphidium florentinae Shupack, 1934
  - †Elphidium formosum Todd, 1957
  - †Elphidium friedbergi Serova, 1955
  - Elphidium frigidum Cushman, 1933
  - Elphidium frizzelli Miller, 1953
  - Elphidium galvestonense Kornfeld, 1931
  - †Elphidium georgianum Cushman, 1935
  - †Elphidium georgium Venglinsky, 1958
  - †Elphidium gibsoni Hayward, 1979
  - †Elphidium glabratum Cushman, 1939
  - †Elphidium granatum Gudina, 1964
  - †Elphidium granti Kleinpell, 1938
  - Elphidium granulosum (Sidebottom, 1909)
  - †Elphidium grimensis Quilty, 1980
  - Elphidium groenlandicum Cushman, 1933
  - †Elphidium guraboense Bermúdez, 1949
  - †Elphidium haagensis van Voorthuysen, 1950
  - †Elphidium hadleyana Smitter, 1955
  - Elphidium halickii Brodniewicz, 1972
  - Elphidium hallandense Brotzen, 1943
  - †Elphidium hampdenense Finlay, 1939
  - †Elphidium hauerinum (d'Orbigny, 1846)
  - Elphidium hawkesburyense (Albani, 1974)
  - †Elphidium helenae Quilty, 1980
  - †Elphidium hiltermanni Hagn, 1952
  - Elphidium hispidulum Cushman, 1936
  - Elphidium hokkaidoense Asano, 1950
  - †Elphidium hornibrooki Srinivasan, 1966
  - †Elphidium howchini Cushman, 1936
  - Elphidium hughesi Cushman & Grant, 1927
  - †Elphidium humboldtensis Haller, 1980
  - †Elphidium hungaricum Korecz-Laky, 1967
  - Elphidium hyalocostatum Todd, 1957
  - †Elphidium ibericum (Schrodt, 1890)
  - †Elphidium icenorum Macfadyen, 1939
  - Elphidium inchonense Mcculloch, 1977
  - †Elphidium inclarum Krasheninnikov, 1960
  - Elphidium indicum Cushman, 1936
  - †Elphidium infrajuliense Bertels, 1977
  - †Elphidium ingressans Dorreen, 1948
  - †Elphidium inopinatum Khalilov, 1957
  - †Elphidium iojimaense Asano & Murata, 1958
  - Elphidium iranicum (Yassini & Ghahreman, 1977)
  - †Elphidium ishikariense Kaiho, 1984
  - †Elphidium izumoense Nomura, 1990
  - †Elphidium javanum Yabe & Asano, 1937
  - Elphidium jiani Lei & Li, 2016
  - †Elphidium johnstonae Mclean, 1956
  - †Elphidium joukovi Serova, 1955
  - †Elphidium kadilnicovi Semenov & Semenova, 1980
  - †Elphidium kaicherae Mclean, 1956
  - Elphidium kaneharai Ishiwada, 1958
  - †Elphidium kanoum Hayward, 1979
  - †Elphidium karenae Asbjornsdottir, 1994
  - †Elphidium karpaticum Myatlyuk, 1950
  - †Elphidium kazmakrisense Mamedova, 1966
  - Elphidium kerguelenense Parr, 1950
  - Elphidium kobense McCulloch, 1977
  - †Elphidium koberi Tollmann, 1955
  - Elphidium koeboeense LeRoy, 1939
  - Elphidium kozlowskii Brodniewicz, 1965
  - †Elphidium kudakoense Bogdanovich, 1947
  - Elphidium kusiroense Asano, 1938
  - †Elphidium laeve (d'Orbigny in Parker, Jones & Brady, 1865)
  - Elphidium lagunense (Albani & Balbero, 1982)
  - †Elphidium laloviensis Venglinsky, 1948
  - Elphidium lanieri (d'Orbigny, 1839)
  - †Elphidium latidorsatum (Reuss, 1864)
  - †Elphidium latispatium Poag, 1966
  - †Elphidium latusovum Krasheninnikov, 1960
  - †Elphidium lauritaense Todd & Kniker, 1952
  - †Elphidium lautenschlaegeri Voloshinova, 1952
  - Elphidium lene Cushman & McCulloch, 1940
  - †Elphidium lens Galloway & Heminway, 1941
  - †Elphidium leonensis Applin & Jordan, 1945
  - Elphidium lessonii (d'Orbigny, 1839)
  - †Elphidium ligatum Krasheninnikov, 1960
  - †Elphidium limatulum Copeland, 1964
  - Elphidium limpidum Ho, Hu & Wang, 1965
  - †Elphidium lobatum Galloway & Heminway, 1941
  - †Elphidium ludbrookae Bhalla & Dev, 1988
  - †Elphidium mabutii Asano, 1962
  - Elphidium macellum (Fichtel & Moll, 1798)
  - Elphidium maioricense Colom, 1942
  - †Elphidium manibulum Khalilov, 1957
  - Elphidium maorium Hayward, 1997
  - Elphidium margaritaceum Cushman, 1930
  - †Elphidium marshallana Todd & Post, 1954
  - Elphidium matagordanum (Kornfeld, 1931)
  - †Elphidium matanginuiense Hayward, 1997
  - †Elphidium matauraense Hayward, 1997
  - †Elphidium matsuense Nomura, 1990
  - Elphidium matsukawauraense Takayanagi, 1955
  - Elphidium mawsoni Parr, 1950
  - Elphidium mexicanum Kornfeld, 1931
  - †Elphidium microelegans Serova, 1955
  - †Elphidium microgranulosum Galloway & Wissler, 1951
  - †Elphidium miikense Murata, 1961
  - Elphidium millettiforme McCulloch, 1977
  - †Elphidium minutum (Reuss, 1865)
  - †Elphidium mirandum Krasheninnikov, 1960
  - †Elphidium mironovi Voloshinova, 1952
  - Elphidium morenoi Bermúdez, 1935
  - Elphidium mortonbayense Albani & Yassini, 1993
  - †Elphidium multacamerum Krasheninnikov, 1960
  - †Elphidium mundulum Todd & Low, 1960
  - †Elphidium musselroeensis Quilty, 1980
  - †Elphidium nagaoi Asano, 1938
  - Elphidium nakanokawaense Shirai, 1960
  - †Elphidium nataliae Popescu, 1995
  - †Elphidium nautiloideum Galloway & Heminway, 1941
  - †Elphidium neocrespinae Gibson, 1983
  - Elphidium neosimplex McCulloch, 1977
  - †Elphidium nigarense Cushman, 1936
  - †Elphidium nipeense Keijzer, 1945
  - †Elphidium noniformis Gerke in Voloshinova & Dain, 1952
  - †Elphidium nonioniformis Smigielska, 1957
  - Elphidium norvangi Buzas, Smith & Beem, 1977
  - †Elphidium notabilis Pishvanova, 1958
  - Elphidium novozealandicum Cushman, 1936
  - †Elphidium obtusum (d'Orbigny, 1846)
  - Elphidium oceanense (d'Orbigny in Fornasini, 1904)
  - Elphidium oceanicum Cushman, 1933
  - †Elphidium oligocenicum Khalilov, 1951
  - †Elphidium ombetsuense Asano, 1962
  - †Elphidium omotoensis Dorreen, 1948
  - Elphidium omuraense Shuto, 1953
  - †Elphidium onerosum Bogdanovich, 1960
  - †Elphidium orientale Voloshinova, 1952
  - Elphidium owenianum (d'Orbigny, 1839)
  - Elphidium ozawai Uchio, 1951
  - †Elphidium panamense Cushman, 1936
  - †Elphidium papillosum Cushman, 1936
  - †Elphidium paraense Petri, 1954
  - †Elphidium paraskevaidisi Christodoulou, 1960
  - Elphidium parviforme McCulloch, 1981
  - †Elphidium parvulum Aoki, 1968
  - Elphidium parvum Zheng, 1980
  - †Elphidium parvus Eremeeva, 1961
  - †Elphidium patagonicum Todd & Kniker, 1952
  - †Elphidium perforatum Nomura, 1990
  - †Elphidium perscitum Serova, 1955
  - †Elphidium philippense Hayward, 1997
  - Elphidium phillipense Hayward, 1997 in Hayward, Hollis & Grenfell, 1997
  - Elphidium pilasense McCulloch, 1977
  - Elphidium planiforme McCulloch, 1981
  - Elphidium planulatum (Lamarck, 1822)
  - Elphidium planum Husezima & Maruhasi, 1944
  - †Elphidium podolicum Serova, 1955
  - Elphidium ponticum (Dolgopolskaya & Pauli, 1931)
  - †Elphidium primum Ten Dam, 1944
  - Elphidium pseudoinflatum Cushman, 1936
  - †Elphidium pseudolessonii Ten Dam & Reinhold, 1941
  - †Elphidium pseudonodosum Cushman, 1936
  - †Elphidium puertoricense Galloway & Heminway, 1941
  - Elphidium pulvereum Todd, 1958
  - Elphidium punctatum (Terquem, 1878)
  - †Elphidium puscharovski Serova, 1955
  - †Elphidium pusillogranosum Venglinsky, 1958
  - †Elphidium pustulisuturale Wang & Cheng, 1981
  - Elphidium pustulosum Cushman & McCulloch, 1940
  - †Elphidium rarum Husezima & Maruhasi, 1944
  - †Elphidium rasshamali Haque, 1970
  - †Elphidium reginum (d'Orbigny, 1846)
  - Elphidium reticulosum Cushman, 1933
  - †Elphidium rioturbiense Malumián, 1994
  - †Elphidium rischtanicum Bykova, 1939
  - †Elphidium rolshauseni Cushman & Ellisor, 1939
  - †Elphidium rota Ellis, 1939
  - Elphidium rotatum Howchin & Parr, 1938
  - †Elphidium rugosum (d'Orbigny, 1846)
  - Elphidium rugulosum Cushman & Wickenden, 1929
  - Elphidium rutteni Hermes, 1945
  - †Elphidium saginatum Finlay, 1939
  - Elphidium sagrum (d'Orbigny, 1839)
  - †Elphidium saitoi Asano & Murata, 1958
  - †Elphidium salebrosum Serova, 1955
  - †Elphidium samueli Zlinská, 1993
  - Elphidium sandiegoense (Lankford, 1973)
  - †Elphidium sandongensis He & Hu, 1978
  - †Elphidium schencki Cushman & Dusenbury, 1934
  - †Elphidium schreiteri Eichenberg, 1935
  - †Elphidium semiinvolutum Myatlyuk, 1956
  - Elphidium semistriatum (d'Orbigny, 1852)
  - †Elphidium sendaiense Takayanagi, 1950
  - †Elphidium seranense Valk, 1945
  - Elphidium seymourense McCulloch, 1977
  - Elphidium shochinae Mayer, 1968
  - Elphidium silvestrii Hayward, 1997 in Hayward, Hollis & Grenfell, 1997
  - Elphidium simaense Makiyama & Nakagawa, 1941
  - Elphidium simulatum McCulloch, 1977
  - Elphidium singaporense McCulloch, 1977
  - †Elphidium skyringense Todd & Kniker, 1952
  - †Elphidium smithi Cushman & Dusenbury, 1934
  - Elphidium somaense Takayanagi, 1955
  - Elphidium spinatum Cushman & Valentine, 1930
  - †Elphidium stebnicaensis Pishvanova, 1964
  - †Elphidium stellans Krasheninnikov, 1960
  - †Elphidium stelliferum Khalilov, 1957
  - Elphidium stimulum Cushman & McCulloch, 1940
  - Elphidium strattoni (Applin, 1925)
  - Elphidium striatopunctatum (Fichtel & Moll, 1798)
  - †Elphidium subcarinatum (Egger, 1857)
  - Elphidium subcrispum Nakamura, 1937
  - †Elphidium subfichtelianum Mamedova, 1966
  - Elphidium subincertum Asano, 1950
  - †Elphidium subinflatum Cushman, 1936
  - Elphidium subnodosum (Münster, 1838)
  - †Elphidium subrotatum Hornibrook, 1961
  - †Elphidium subsphaericum Cushman & Hedberg, 1930
  - †Elphidium sumitomoi Asano & Murata, 1958
  - †Elphidium suzukii Husezima & Maruhasi, 1944
  - †Elphidium taiwanum Nakamura, 1937
  - †Elphidium tengiense Mamedova, 1966
  - †Elphidium terquemianum Le Calvez, 1950
  - †Elphidium tikutoensis Nakamura, 1937
  - †Elphidium toddae Petri, 1955
  - Elphidium tongaense (Cushman, 1931)
  - †Elphidium transcarpaticum Venglinsky, 1948
  - Elphidium translucens Natland, 1938
  - †Elphidium tropicale Petri, 1954
  - Elphidium tsudai Chiji & Nakaseko, 1950
  - Elphidium tumidum Natland, 1938
  - †Elphidium twiggsanum Cushman, 1945
  - †Elphidium ukrainicum Krasheninnikov, 1960
  - †Elphidium ustilatum Todd, 1957
  - Elphidium vavauense Hayward, 1997 in Hayward, Hollis & Grenfell, 1997
  - Elphidium vellai Hayward, 1997
  - Elphidium venetum (Albani, Favero & Serandrei Barbero, 1991)
  - Elphidium vitreum Collins, 1974
  - Elphidium voorthuyseni Haake, 1962
  - †Elphidium vulgare Voloshinova, 1952
  - Elphidium waddense van Voorthuysen, 1975
  - †Elphidium wadeae (Hornibrook, 1961)
  - †Elphidium wakkanabense Kaiho, 1992
  - Elphidium williamsoni Haynes, 1973
  - Elphidium wordeni McCulloch, 1977
  - †Elphidium yumotoense Asano, 1949
  - †Elphidium zeivensis Khalilov, 1957
