= Midyat Limestone =

Geologic formation in Turkey

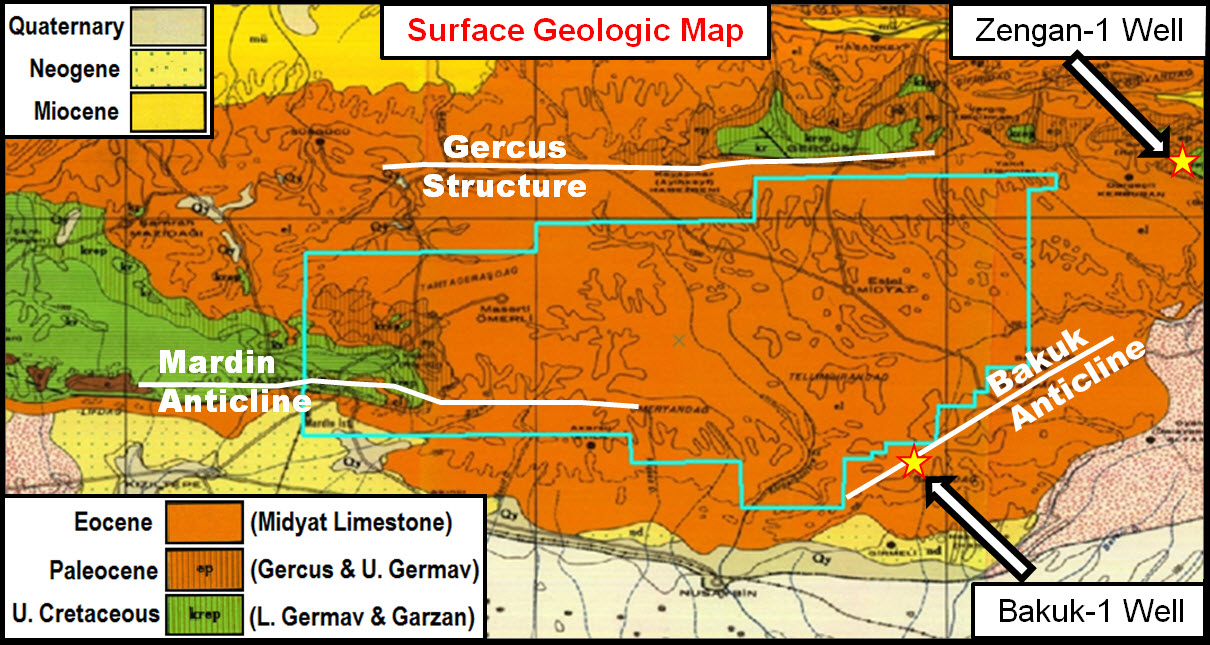
Mardin Anticline surface geologic map

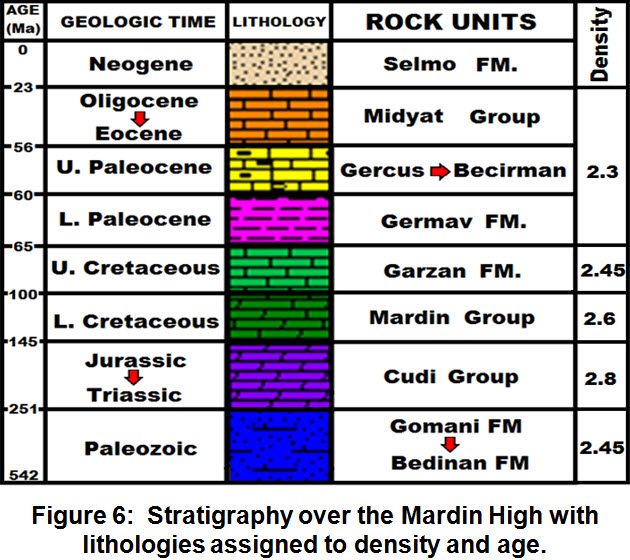
Stratigraphy over the Mardin High

The Midyat Limestone, also known as Mardin Stone and locally as Katori, is a prominent limestone unit of Eocene age that forms part of the Midyat Group.It dominates the surface geology of the anticlinal structures of the Mardin High of south-eastern Turkey, particularly in Mardin Province. The formation is widely recognised for both its geological significance and its long-standing use as a building stone in the region.

== Geological setting ==
The Midyat Limestone forms part of a Cretaceous–Eocene carbonate succession developed on the northern margin of the Arabian Platform. It is exposed mainly in the cores of anticlines within the Mardin High, where uplift and deformation associated with Miocene tectonic activity have brought Eocene strata to the surface.

This Eocene aged light yellowish marly chalk was formed in a marine depositional environment near the continental shelf. Fossils such as echinoids and nummulites can be seen in the different sections of this limestone formation which can have a thickness between 300 and 400 meters.

In the few areas that have exposed Cretaceous rocks, there is a transitional layer known as the Gercus, which separates the younger Eocene limestone. This transitional layer consists of red sandy gypsum bearing beds interbedded with marl and limestone. Exposed areas of the older Cretaceous Germav Formation can be seen in small areas of the Mardin High. The exposed Germav consists of shale, but has and a slow transition into more marls and limestones toward the bottom of the formation toward the Lower Cretaceous Mardin Limestone.
