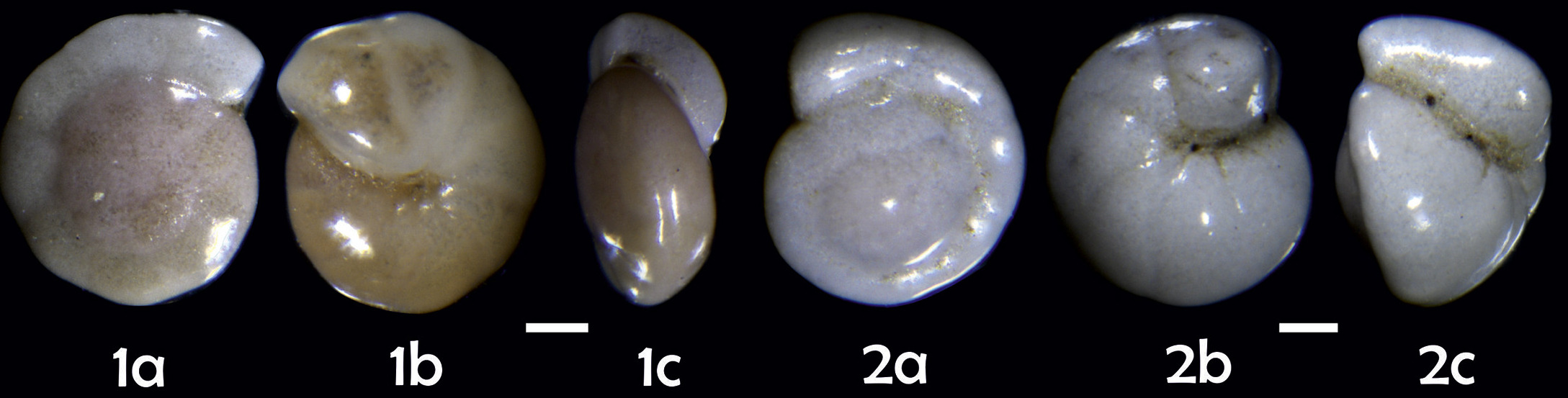
- Gyroidina orbicularis (1) and Hansenisca soldanii (2)

Scientific classification
- Domain: Eukaryota
- Clade: Sar
- Clade: Rhizaria
- Phylum: Retaria
- Subphylum: Foraminifera
- Class: Globothalamea
- Order: Rotaliida
- Superfamily: Chilostomelloidea
- Family: Gavelinellidae; Hofker, 1956

= Gavelinellidae =

Gavelinellidae Temporal range: Barremian - Recent

Family of single-celled organisms

Gavelinellidae is a family of foraminifera belonging to the superfamily Chilostomelloidea and the order Rotaliida. It is found in marine sediments of the Barremian (early Cretaceous) and exists into the present-day (Holocene).

== Genera ==
The family Gavelinellidae consists of the following genera:

- Subfamilia Gavelinellinae
  - † Angulogavelinella
  - Anomalinulla
  - † Asianella
  - † Berthelina
  - † Bilingulogavelinella
  - † Boldia
  - Cocoarota
  - † Conorbinoides
  - Echigoina
  - † Gavelinella
  - † Globogyroidina
  - Gyroidella
  - Gyroidina
  - Gyroidinopsis
  - Hansenisca
  - † Hollandina
  - † Holmanella
  - † Lingulogavelinella
  - † Lingulogavelinelloides
  - † Notoplanulina
  - † Paralabamina
  - † Pilleussella
  - † Primanomalina
  - † Pseudogavelinella
  - † Sliterella
- Subfamily Gyroidinoidinae
  - † Escornebovina
  - † Nummodiscorbis
  - † Rotaliatina
  - Rotaliatinopsis
  - † Saitoella
  - † Scarificatina
  - † Sliteria
