= Anochanus sinensis =

Scientific classification
- Kingdom: Animalia
- Phylum: Echinodermata
- Class: Echinoidea
- Order: Spatangoida
- Family: Cassiduloida
- Genus: Anochanus
- Species: A. sinensis

Binomial name
- Anochanus sinensis (Grube, 1868)

Species of sea urchin

Anochanus sinensis is a species of sea urchin of the family Cassiduloida. They have sexual reproduction. Their armour is covered with spines. It is placed in the genus Anochanus and lives in the sea. Anochanus sinensis was first scientifically described in 1868 by Adolph Grube.
