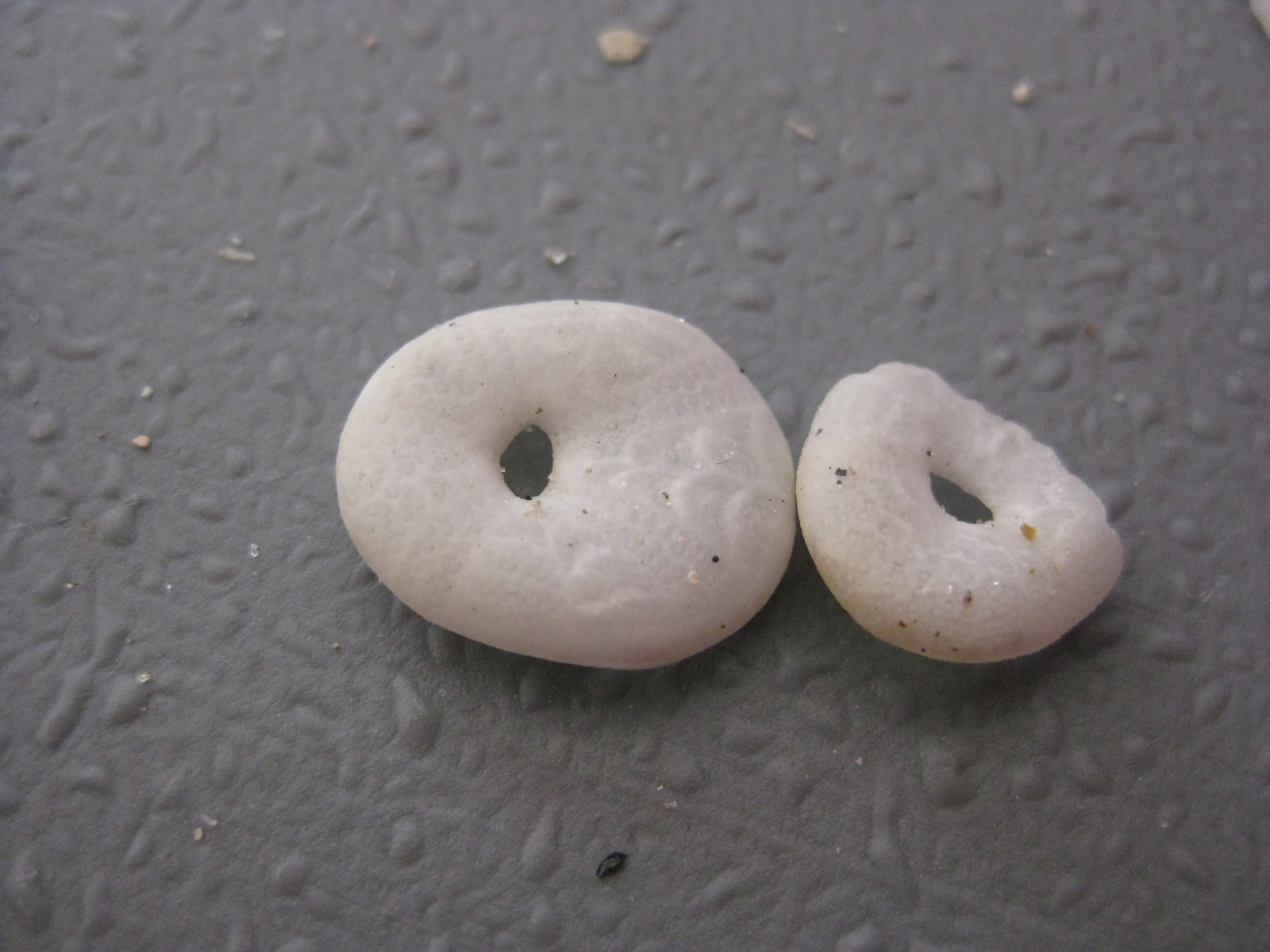
- Apatopygus recens

Scientific classification
- Kingdom: Animalia
- Phylum: Echinodermata
- Class: Echinoidea
- Order: Cassiduloida
- Family: Apatopygidae
- Genus: Apatopygus; Hawkins, 1920

= Apatopygus =

Genus of sea urchins

Apatopygus is a genus of echinoderms belonging to the family Apatopygidae.

The species of this genus are found in Australia and New Zealand.

Species:

- Apatopygus garciasanzi Forner, 2016
- Apatopygus gaudensis Gatt, 2005
- Apatopygus mannumensis Holmes, 1999
- Apatopygus occidentalis H.L. Clark, 1938
- Apatopygus recens (Milne Edwards, 1836)
- Apatopygus vincentinus (Tate, 1891)
