= Aphanopora =

Scientific classification
- Kingdom: Animalia
- Phylum: Echinodermata
- Class: Echinoidea
- Order: Cassiduloida
- Family: Neolampadidae
- Genus: Aphanopora de Meijere, 1903

Genus of sea urchins

Aphanopora is a genus of echinoderms belonging to the family Neolampadidae.

Species:

- Aphanopora bassoris Holmes, 1995
- Aphanopora echinobrissoides de Meijere, 1903
