= Helicites =

Helicites may refer to:

- Helicites, a genus of gastropods in the family Helicidae, synonym of Helix
- Helicites, a genus of foraminifers in the family Nummulitidae, synonym of Nummulites
