= Nonionoidea =

Nonionoidea Temporal range: U Cret (Conia) - Recent

Scientific classification
- Domain: Eukaryota
- Clade: Sar
- Clade: Rhizaria
- Phylum: Retaria
- Subphylum: Foraminifera
- Class: Globothalamea
- Order: Rotaliida
- Superfamily: Nonionoidea; Schultze, 1854

Families
- Almaenidae Myatlyuk, 1959; Astrononionidae Cushman & Edwards, 1937; Melonidae Holzmann & Pawlowski, 2017; Miscellaneidae Sigal in Piveteau, 1952 emend. Hottinger, 2009 †; Nonionidae Schultze, 1854; Pulleniidae Schwager, 1877; Spirotectinidae Saidova, 1981

Superfamily of single-celled organisms

Nonionoidea or Nonionacea is a superfamily of protists within the foraminiferal order Rotaliida that unites the families Nonionidae, Spirotectintidae, and Almaenidae; characterized by tests commonly of perforate hyaline oblique calcite, usually appearing optically granular.
