= Favocassidulina =

Scientific classification
- Domain: Eukaryota
- Clade: Sar
- Clade: Rhizaria
- Phylum: Retaria
- Subphylum: Foraminifera
- Class: Globothalamea
- Order: Rotaliida
- Family: Cassidulinidae
- Genus: Favocassidulina; Loeblich and Tappan. 1957

Genus of single-celled organisms

Favocassidulina is a foraminiferal genus; rotaliid family Cassidulinidae, known from the middle Miocene to recent in the Indian and Pacific oceans. Its habitat is benthic, near shore.

The test wall is calcareous, finely perforate; primary wall indistinctly optically radial, as the calcite crystals are dendritic in form and occur in bundles; inner and outer surface of the wall covered by a microgranular veneer. Variation in wall structure results in thick walls appearing optically granular. The surface is covered with a secondarily formed honeycomb network of narrow elevated ridges forming polygonal open areas.
