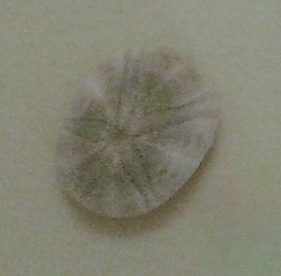
- Cassidulus mitis

Scientific classification
- Kingdom: Animalia
- Phylum: Echinodermata
- Class: Echinoidea
- Order: Cassiduloida
- Family: Cassidulidae
- Genus: Cassidulus; Lamarck, 1801

= Cassidulus =

Genus of sea urchins

Cassidulus is a genus of echinoderms belonging to the family Cassidulidae.

The species of this genus are found in Europe, America and Africa.

Species:

- Cassidulus abruptus Conrad, 1860
- Cassidulus amygdala Desor, 1858
- Cassidulus briareus Souto & Martins, 2018
- Cassidulus caribaearum Lamarck, 1801
- Cassidulus conradi (Conrad, 1850)
- Cassidulus cubensis Weisbord, 1934
- Cassidulus delectus Krau, 1960
- Cassidulus emmonsi Stephenson, 1928
- Cassidulus ericsoni Fischer, 1951
- Cassidulus evergladensis Mansfield, 1932
- Cassidulus faberi Ravn, 1927
- Cassidulus globosus Fischer, 1951
- Cassidulus infidus Mortensen, 1948
- Cassidulus kellumi Stephenson, 1928
- Cassidulus kieri Adegoke, 1977
- Cassidulus mercedensis Anderson, 1958
- Cassidulus mestieri Kier, 1966
- Cassidulus mitis Krau, 1954
- Cassidulus platypetalus Arnold & H.L. Clark, 1934
- Cassidulus rojasi Sánchez Roig, 1953
- Cassidulus santolayae Sillero, 1994
- Cassidulus senni Kier, 1966
- Cassidulus sphaeroides Arnold & H.L. Clark, 1934
- Cassidulus taylori Warren, 1926
- Cassidulus zanolettii Sánchez Roig, 1952
