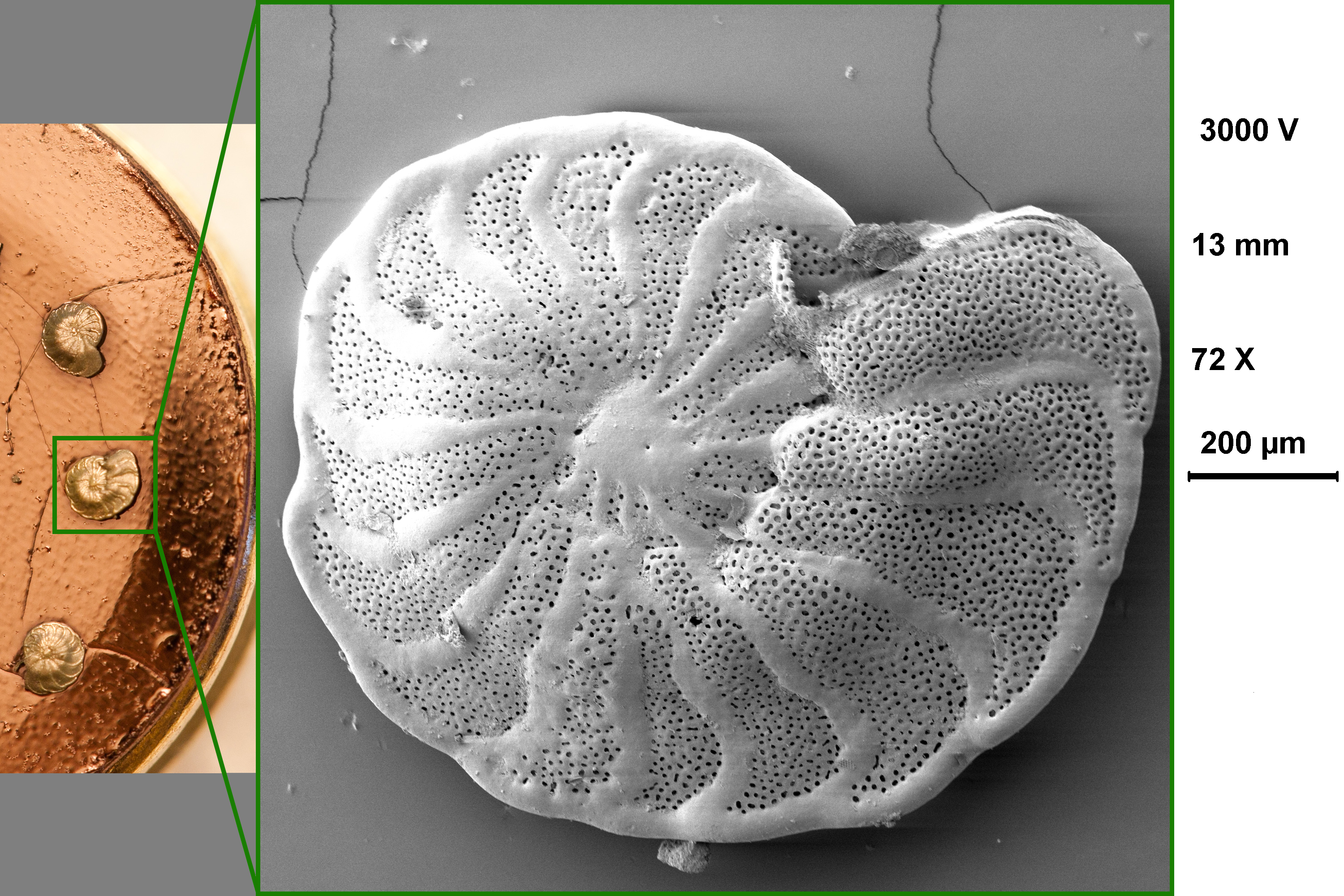
- Planulina limbata

Scientific classification
- Domain: Eukaryota
- Clade: Sar
- Clade: Rhizaria
- Phylum: Retaria
- Subphylum: Foraminifera
- Class: Globothalamea
- Order: Rotaliida
- Superfamily: Planorbulinoidea; Schwager, 1877

Families
- Bisacciidae; Cibicididae; Cymbaloporidae; Louisianinidae; Planorbulinidae; Planulinidae; Victoriellidae

Synonyms
- Planorbulinacea Schwager, 1877

= Planorbulinoidea =

Planorbulinoidea Temporal range: Early Cretaceous - recent

Superfamily of single-celled organisms

Planorbulinoidea is a superfamily of rotalliid foraminifera that has been extant since the Early Cretaceous (Berriasian), characterized by trochospiral tests, at least in early stage but which later may become uncoiled. The test wall is of perforate hyaline calcite, commonly optically radial in structure, with crystallographic c-axes perpendicular to the surface. The apertural face may be imperforate; the aperture interiomarginal and extraumbilical-umbilical to nearly equatorial in coiled forms, subterminal in uncoiled forms.

The Planorbulinoidea unite six families which are distinguished primarily by their morphological differences.
