= Cassidulinoidea =

Cassidulinoidea Temporal range: Paleocene - Recent

Scientific classification
- Domain: Eukaryota
- Clade: Sar
- Clade: Rhizaria
- Phylum: Retaria
- Subphylum: Foraminifera
- Class: Globothalamea
- Order: Rotaliida
- Superfamily: Cassidulinoidea d'Orbigny, 1839

Superfamily of single-celled organisms

Cassidulinoidea or Cassidulinacea is a superfamily of benthic amoeboid foraminifera in the order Rotaliida that has been extant from the Paleocene down to the present. Tests are composed of secreted, optically radial or granular, perforate calcite with chambers biserially coiled at least in the early part, Apertures are usually an interiomarginal slit, but may become terminal and may have secondary features.

Cassidulinoidea is included in the suborder Rotaliina by Loeblich and Tappan, e.g. 1964 and 1988, since redefined as the Rotaliida and since reassigned to the Buliminida in Sen Gupta 2002. Two families are included. They are the Cassidulinidae, and Cassidulinitidae

The Cassidulinidae, which has a range from the Paleocene to the present, includes most of the genera. The Cassidulinitidae which includes only Cassidulinita is restricted to the Pliocene.
