= Nonionidae =

Nonionidae Temporal range: U Cret (Conia) - Recent

Scientific classification
- Domain: Eukaryota
- Clade: Sar
- Clade: Rhizaria
- Phylum: Retaria
- Subphylum: Foraminifera
- Class: Globothalamea
- Order: Rotaliida
- Superfamily: Nonionoidea
- Genus: Nonionidae; Schultze, 1854

Family of single-celled organisms

The Nonionidae is a foraminifera family within the order Rotaliida and part of the Nonionoidea, shells, or tests, of which are planispiral or trochospiral, calcareous and finely perforate. Includes the Nonioninae, Pulleniinae, Spirotectinae, and Astrononioninae.
