= Baggina =

Scientific classification
- Domain: Eukaryota
- Clade: Sar
- Clade: Rhizaria
- Phylum: Retaria
- Subphylum: Foraminifera
- Class: Globothalamea
- Order: Rotaliida
- Family: Bagginidae
- Subfamily: Baggininae
- Genus: Baggina; Cushman, 1926

Genus of single-celled organisms

Baggina is a genus of foraminiferans in the order Rotaliida.
