= Asterigerinoidea =

Asterigerinoidea Temporal range: Cretaceous–Recent
- Amphistegina gibbosa

Scientific classification
- Domain: Eukaryota
- Clade: Sar
- Clade: Rhizaria
- Phylum: Retaria
- Subphylum: Foraminifera
- Class: Globothalamea
- Order: Rotaliida
- Superfamily: Asterigerinoidea d'Orbigny, 1839

Families
- Amphisteginidae Cushman, 1927; Asterigerinatidae Reiss, 1963; Asterigerinidae d'Orbigny, 1839; Boreloididae Reiss, 1963 †; Epistomariidae Hofker, 1954; Helicosteginidae Mitchell, E. Robinson & Özcan in Mitchell et al., 2022 †; Lepidocyclinidae Scheffen, 1932 †; Nuttallidae Saidova, 1981; Pseudolepidinidae Mitchell, E. Robinson & Özcan in Mitchell et al., 2022 †

Synonyms
- Asterigerinacea d'Orbigny, 1839; Asteriginoidea

Superfamily of single-celled organisms

Asterigerinoidea is a superfamily of Foraminifera included in the order Rotaliida, proposed by Loeblich and Tappan in 1988.

The Asterigerinoidea unites three families, the Episomariidae and Asterigerinidae which had been included in the Discorboidea and the Amphisteginidae which was included in the Orbitoidoidea in the Treatise on Invertebrate Paleontology, Part C.

Asterigerinoidea are characterized by a trochospiral or nearly planispiral arrangement of the chambers, which are fully or partially subdivided by internal partitions. The primary aperture is commonly on the interior margin and secondary apertures are commonly along the sutures. Apertures may also form on the chamber surfaces as well. Test walls are composed of optically radial calcite.

The Asterigerinoidea range from the Cretaceous to Recent, the oldest family being the Asterigerinidae.
