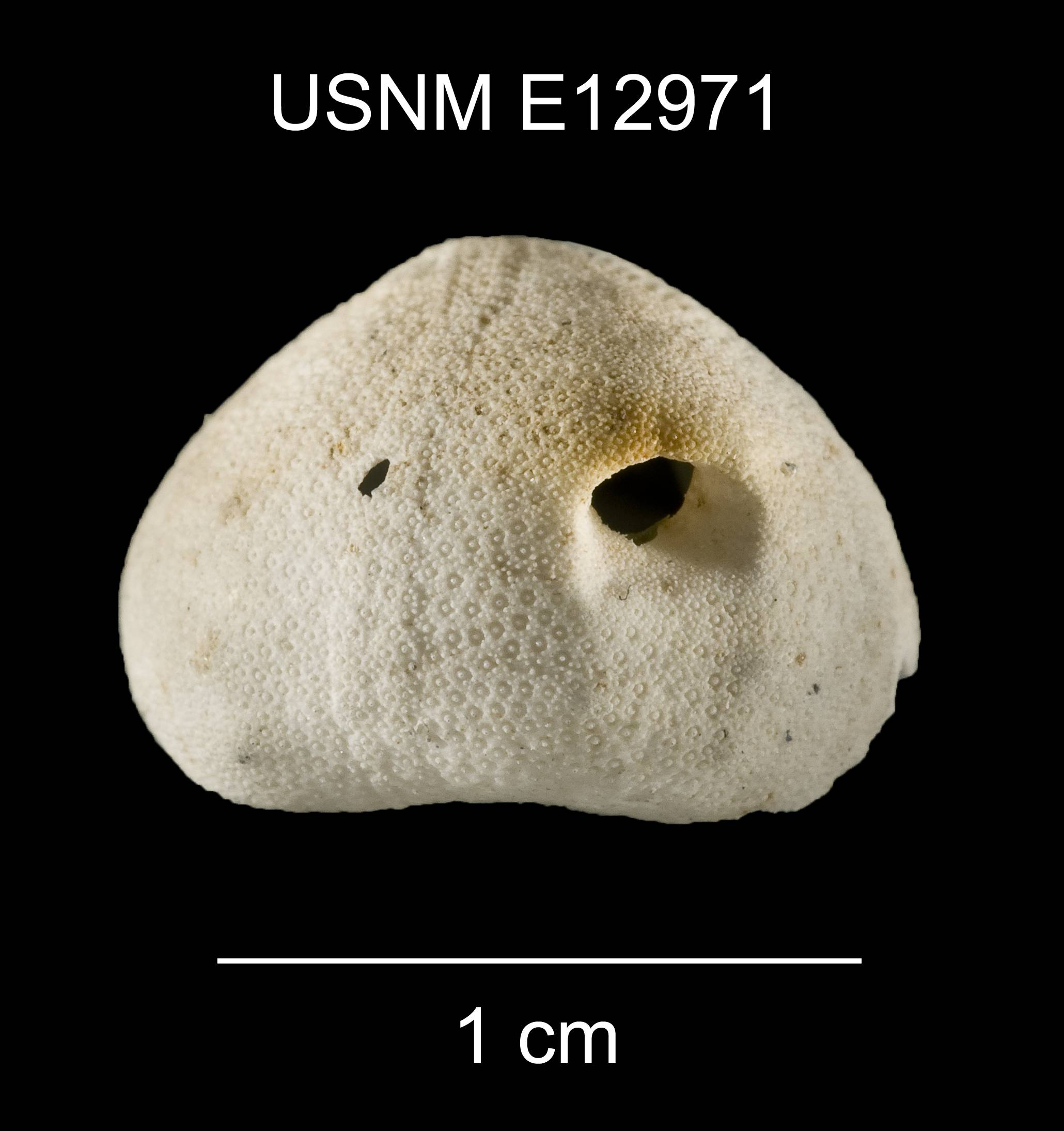
- Eurhodia relicta

Scientific classification
- Kingdom: Animalia
- Phylum: Echinodermata
- Class: Echinoidea
- Order: Cassiduloida
- Family: Cassidulidae
- Genus: Eurhodia; Haime, 1853

= Eurhodia =

Genus of sea urchins

Eurhodia is a genus of echinoderms belonging to the family Cassidulidae.

The species of this genus are found in Europe and Northern America.

Species:

- Eurhodia baumi Kier, 1980
- Eurhodia corralesi Sánchez Roig, 1951
- Eurhodia elbana Cooke, 1942
- Eurhodia falconensis Jeannet, 1928
- Eurhodia freneixae Roman & Gorodiski, 1959
- Eurhodia holmesi (Twitchell, 1915)
- Eurhodia morrisi Haime, 1853
- Eurhodia relicta Mooi, 1990
- Eurhodia rugosa
- Eurhodia trojana (Cooke, 1942)
