= Nummulitidae =

Scientific classification
- Domain: Eukaryota
- Clade: Sar
- Clade: Rhizaria
- Phylum: Retaria
- Subphylum: Foraminifera
- Class: Globothalamea
- Order: Rotaliida
- Superfamily: Nummulitacea
- Family: Nummulitidae; Blainville, 1827

Genera
- Assilina d'Orbigny, 1839; Cycloclypeus W.B. Carpenter, 1856; Heterocyclina Hottinger, 1977; Heterostegina d'Orbigny, 1826; Nummulites Lamarck, 1801; Operculina d'Orbigny, 1826; Operculinella Yabe, 1918; Planoperculina Hottinger, 1977; Planostegina Banner & Hodgkinson, 1991

Family of foraminifera in the order Rotaliida

Nummulitidae is a family of foraminifera in the order Rotaliida. It was described in 1827 by Henri Marie Ducrotay de Blainville.

== Genera ==
- Assilina d'Orbigny, 1839
- Cycloclypeus W.B. Carpenter, 1856
- Heterocyclina Hottinger, 1977
- Heterostegina d'Orbigny, 1826
- Nummulites Lamarck, 1801
- Operculina d'Orbigny, 1826
- Operculinella Yabe, 1918
- Planoperculina Hottinger, 1977
- Planostegina Banner & Hodgkinson, 1991
