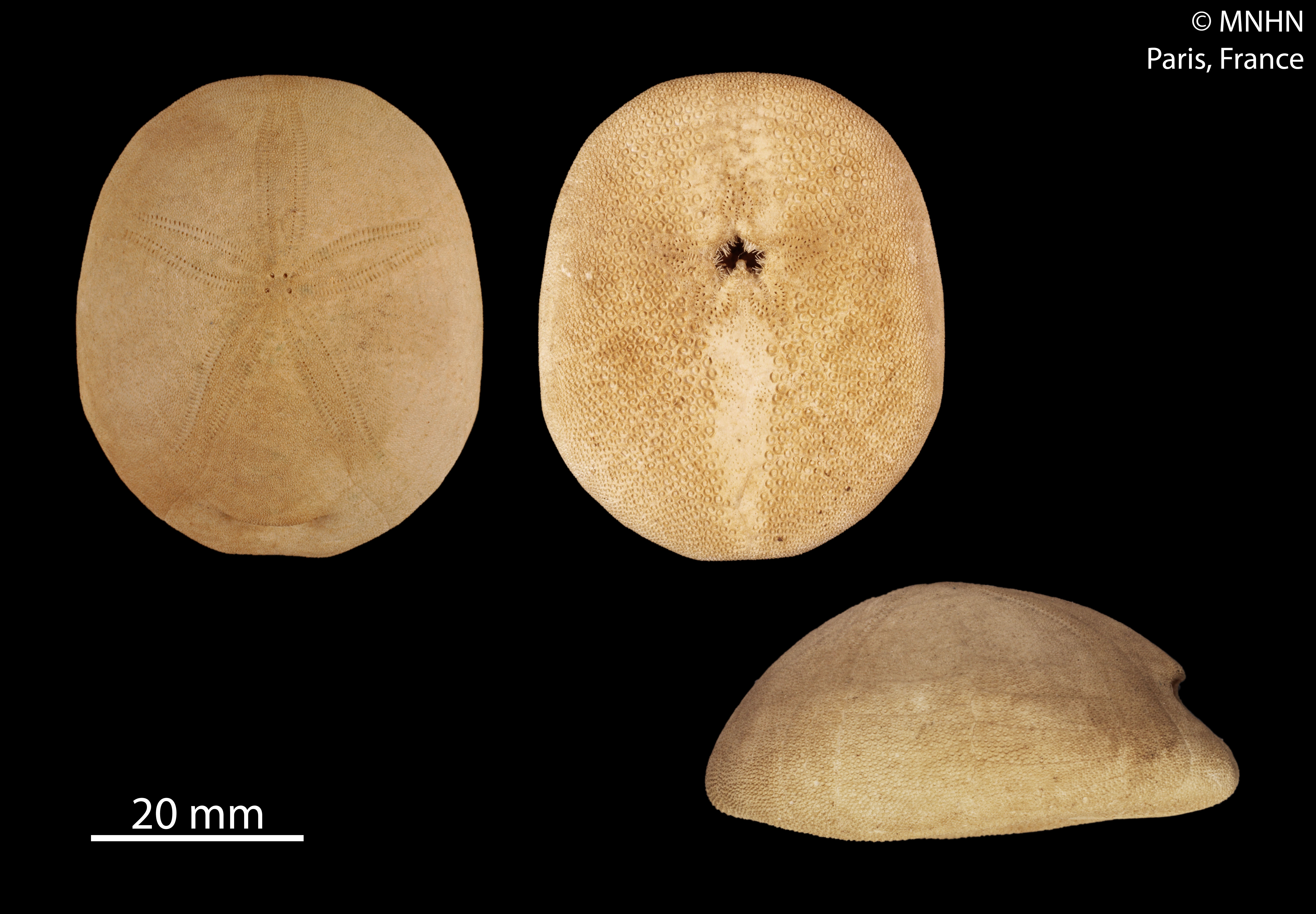
- Rhyncholampas pacificus

Scientific classification
- Kingdom: Animalia
- Phylum: Echinodermata
- Class: Echinoidea
- Order: Cassiduloida
- Family: Cassidulidae
- Genus: Rhyncholampas

= Rhyncholampas =

Genus of sea urchins

Rhyncholampas is a genus of echinoderms belonging to the family Cassidulidae.

The species of this genus are found in Europe and Northern America.

Species:

- Rhyncholampas pacificus (A. Agassiz, 1863)
- Rhyncholampas caribaearum (Lamarck, 1816)
