= Acervulinoidea =

Acervulinoidea Temporal range: Paleocene–Recent

Scientific classification
- Domain: Eukaryota
- Clade: Sar
- Clade: Rhizaria
- Phylum: Retaria
- Subphylum: Foraminifera
- Class: Globothalamea
- Order: Rotaliida
- Superfamily: Acervulinoidea; Schultze, 1854

Synonyms
- Acervulinacea Schultze, 1854

Superfamily of single-celled organisms

Acervulinoidea or Acervulinacea is a superfamily in the Foraminifera order Rotaliida. The Acervulinoidea may be free, or able to move about, or their tests may be attached to some substrate. The early growth stage is spiral, followed by irregular chambers that form an irregular mass, disc, or branching structure. The test wall is of hyaline (glassy) optically radial calcite and is coarsely perforate. Apertures are present only as mural pores.

The Acervulinoidea contains two families with living genera, the Acervulinidae of Schultze, 1854 and the Homotrematidae of Loeblich and Tappan, 1964. The Acervulinidae are characterized by a free or attached test with an early spiral stage followed by spreading chambers in one or more layers. The range is from Paleocene to recent. Example genera are Acervulina and Gypsina. The Homotrematidae are characterized by an attached test with early chambers in an irregular trochospiral, later chambers numerous in a massive or branching structure growing up from the attachment. Apertures are large, by a perforated plate. Range: Eocene to Recent. Genera include Homotrema and Miniarcina.
