= Neolampadidae =

Scientific classification
- Domain: Eukaryota
- Kingdom: Animalia
- Phylum: Echinodermata
- Class: Echinoidea
- Order: Cassiduloida
- Family: Neolampadidae

Family of sea urchins

Neolampadidae is a family of echinoderms belonging to the order Cassiduloida.

Genera:

- Aphanopora de Meijere, 1903
- †Daradaster
- †Gitolampas
