= Rotalioidea =

Rotalioidea Temporal range: M Cretaceous - Recent

Scientific classification
- Domain: Eukaryota
- Clade: Sar
- Clade: Rhizaria
- Phylum: Retaria
- Subphylum: Foraminifera
- Class: Globothalamea
- Order: Rotaliida
- Superfamily: Rotalioidea; Ehrenberg, 1839

Synonyms
- Rotaliacea Ehrenberg, 1839

Superfamily of single-celled organisms

The Rotalioidea or Rotaliacea (sensu Sen Gupta, 1999) is a superfamily of mostly benthic foraminifera in the order Rotaliida.
