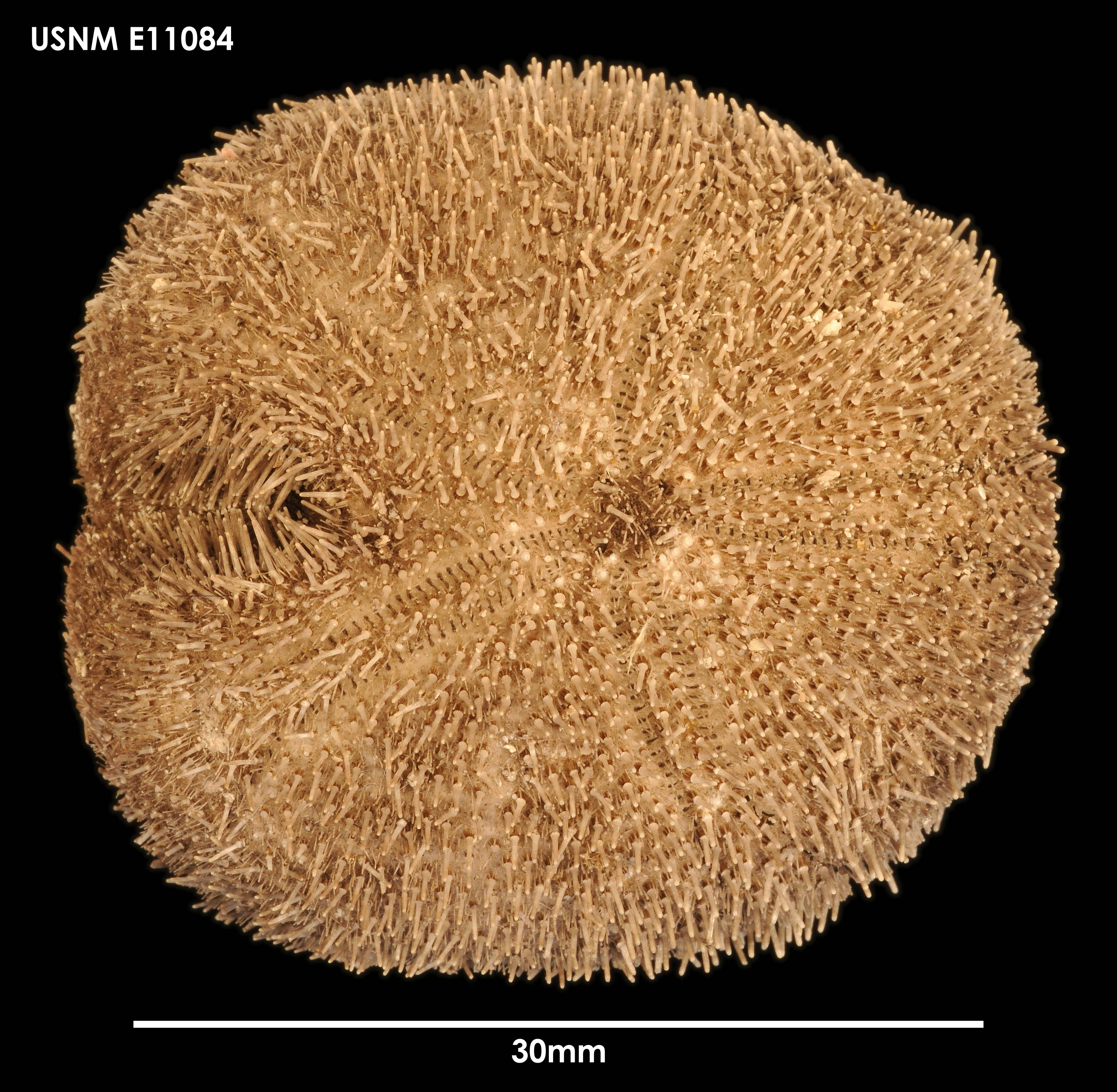
- Apatopygus recens

Scientific classification
- Kingdom: Animalia
- Phylum: Echinodermata
- Class: Echinoidea
- Order: Cassiduloida
- Family: Apatopygidae

= Apatopygidae =

Family of sea urchins

Apatopygidae is a family of echinoderms belonging to the order Cassiduloida.

Genera:

- Apatopygus Hawkins, 1920
- Jolyclypus Lambert, 1918
- Nucleopygus L. Agassiz, 1840
- Porterpygus Baker, 1983
