= Chilostomelloidea =

Chilostomelloidea Temporal range: Early Cretaceous - Present (Barremian - present)

Scientific classification
- Domain: Eukaryota
- Clade: Diaphoretickes
- Clade: SAR
- Clade: Rhizaria
- Phylum: Retaria
- Subphylum: Foraminifera
- Class: Globothalamea
- Order: Rotaliida
- Superfamily: Chilostomelloidea; Brady, 1881

Families
- See text

Synonyms
- Chilostomellacea

Superfamily of foraminifera in the order Rotaliida

Chilostomelloidea is a superfamily of foraminifera in the order Rotaliida. They are found in sediments of Early Cretaceous (Barremian) to the present.

The test, or shell, may be trochospiral to planispiral throughout, or just in the early part with the later part uncoiled. Chambers may be somewhat enveloping, and attached forms may uncoil in the adult. In coiled forms, the aperture is interiomarginal, or terminal in uncoiled forms. The test wall is made of optically granular perforate hyaline (glassy) oblique calcite.

== Subtaxa ==
The superfamily Chilostomelloidea consists of the following families:

- Alabaminidae Hofker, 1951
- Anomalinidae Cushman, 1927
- Chilostomellidae Brady, 1881
- †Coleitidae Loeblich & Tappan, 1984
- Gavelinellidae Hofker, 1956
- †Globorotalitidae Loeblich & Tappan, 1984
- Karreriidae Saidova, 1981
- †Lublinidae Gawor-Biedowa, 1989
- Quadrimorphinidae Saidova, 1981
- Svratkinidae Bugrova, 1989
- Trichohyalidae Saidova, 1981
