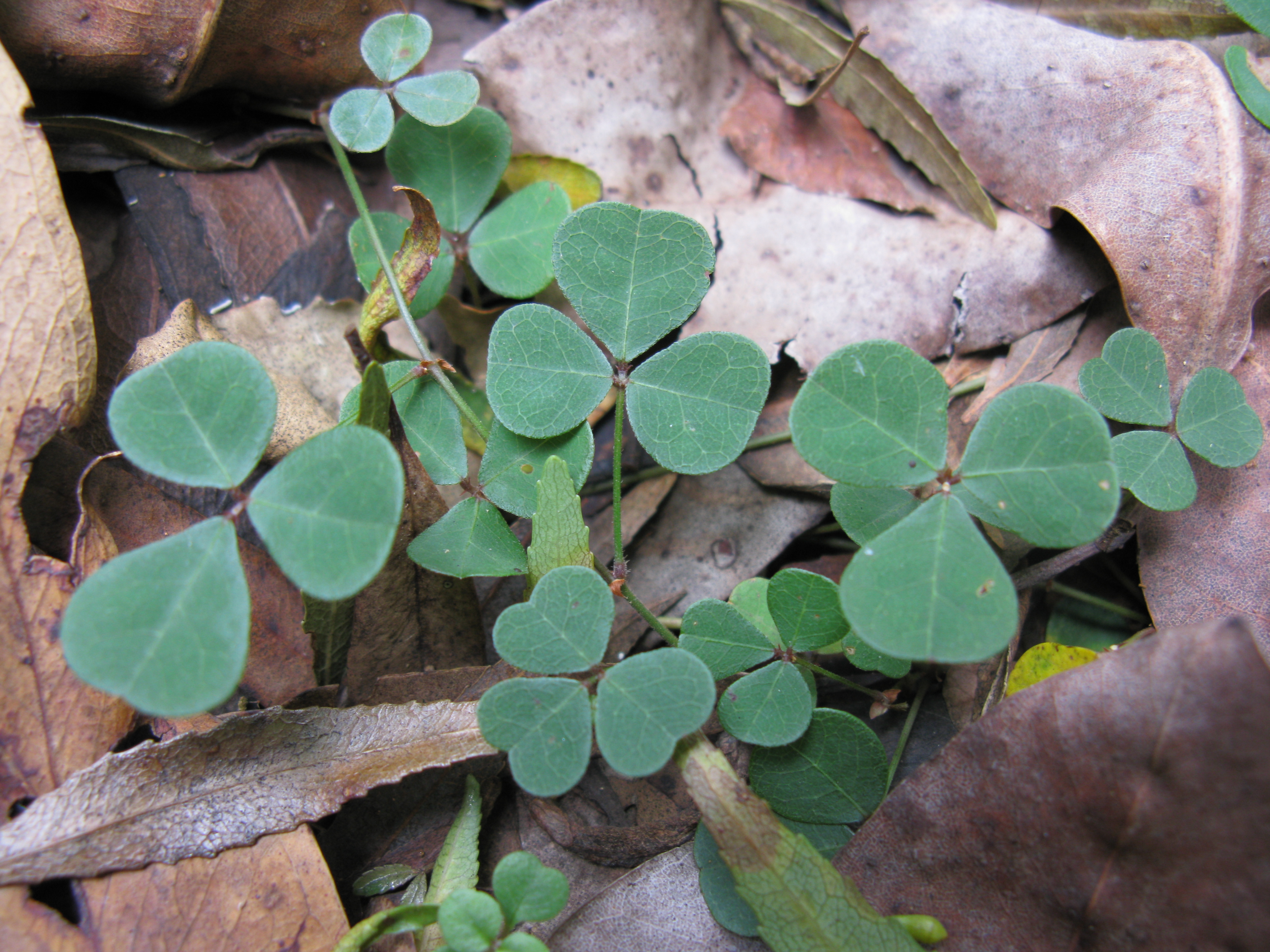

Scientific classification
- Kingdom: Plantae
- Clade: Tracheophytes
- Clade: Angiosperms
- Clade: Eudicots
- Clade: Rosids
- Order: Fabales
- Family: Fabaceae
- Genus: Pullenia; H.Ohashi & K.Ohashi (2018)
- Species: P. gunnii

Binomial name
- Pullenia gunnii (Benth. ex Hook.f.) H.Ohashi & K.Ohashi (2018)

Synonyms
- Desmodium gunnii Benth. ex Hook.f. (1856); Desmodium varians var. gunnii (Benth. ex Hook.f.) Benth. (1864); Desmodium gunnianum Benth. ex A.Gray (1854)

= Pullenia gunnii =

Genus of flowering plants

Pullenia gunnii is a species of flowering plant in the legume family, Fabaceae. It is the sole species in genus Pullenia.

It is an annual, perennial, or subshrub native to New Caledonia, New Guinea, New South Wales, Queensland, Tasmania and Victoria (Australia).

The genus was circumscribed by Hiroyoshi Ohashi and Kazuaki K. Ohashi in J. Jap. Bot. vol.93 (Issue 5) on pages 299-301 in 2018. The genus name of Pullenia is in honour of Royal 'Roy' Pullen (1925 - 2009), who was an Australian plant collector. Including between 1957-1972 collecting in Papua New Guinea.

== Description ==
This plant is a sprawling to ascending perennial; with stems to 40 cm (16 in) long, glabrous or with appressed hairs.

It has 3-foliolate leaves; leaflets rhombic and truncate at apex, subglabrous, a few hairs on veins on lower surface, terminal leaflets 0.5–2 cm long, 7–11 mm wide, lateral leaflets smaller; petiole 10–30 mm long; stipules 2–4 mm long.

Racemes to 16 cm (6 in) long, pedicels 1.5–7 mm long. The flowers are 1–1.2 mm long and in shades of pink or lavender.

Pods are up to 30 mm long; with a dense indumentum of spreading hooked hairs and has up to 6 articles (a fruit with constrictions between the seeds) which are 4–5 mm long.
