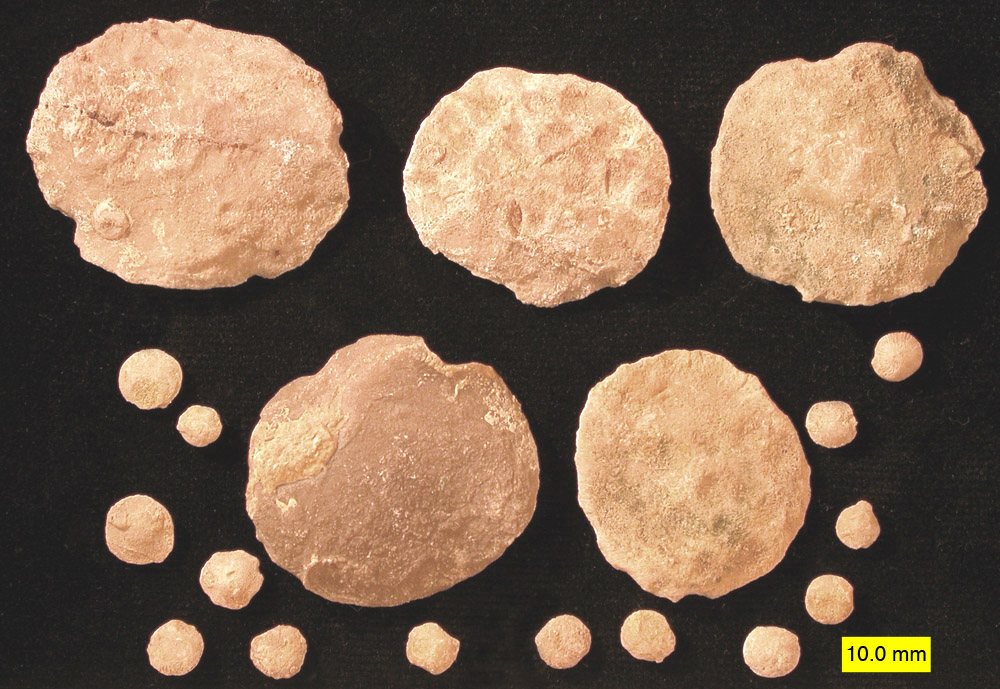
- Fossil nummulitid foraminiferans showing microspheric and megalospheric individuals; Eocene of the United Arab Emirates; scale in mm.

Scientific classification
- Domain: Eukaryota
- Clade: Sar
- Clade: Rhizaria
- Phylum: Foraminifera
- Class: Globothalamea
- Order: Rotaliida
- Family: Nummulitidae
- Genus: Nummulites; Lamarck, 1801

Species
- Numerous

= Nummulite =

Nummulite Temporal range: Late Cretaceous - Recent, 85.8–0 Ma

Genus of Protozoan

A nummulite is a large lenticular fossil, characterised by its numerous coils, subdivided by septa into chambers. They are the shells of the fossil and present-day marine protozoan Nummulites, a type of foraminiferan. Nummulites commonly vary in diameter from 13 to 50 mm (0.51 to 1.97 in) and are common in Eocene to Miocene marine rocks, particularly around southwest Asia and the Mediterranean in the area that once constituted the Tethys Ocean, such as Eocene limestones from Egypt or from Pakistan. Fossils up to six inches wide are found in the Middle Eocene rocks of Turkey. They are valuable as index fossils.

The ancient Egyptians used nummulite shells as coins and the pyramids were constructed using limestone that contained nummulites. The name Nummulites is a diminutive form of the Latin nummulus 'little coin', a reference to their shape.

In 1913, naturalist Randolph Kirkpatrick published a book, The Nummulosphere: an account of the Organic Origin of so-called Igneous Rocks and Abyssal Red Clays, proposing the unconventional theory that all rocks had been produced through the accumulation of forams such as Nummulites.

== Gallery ==
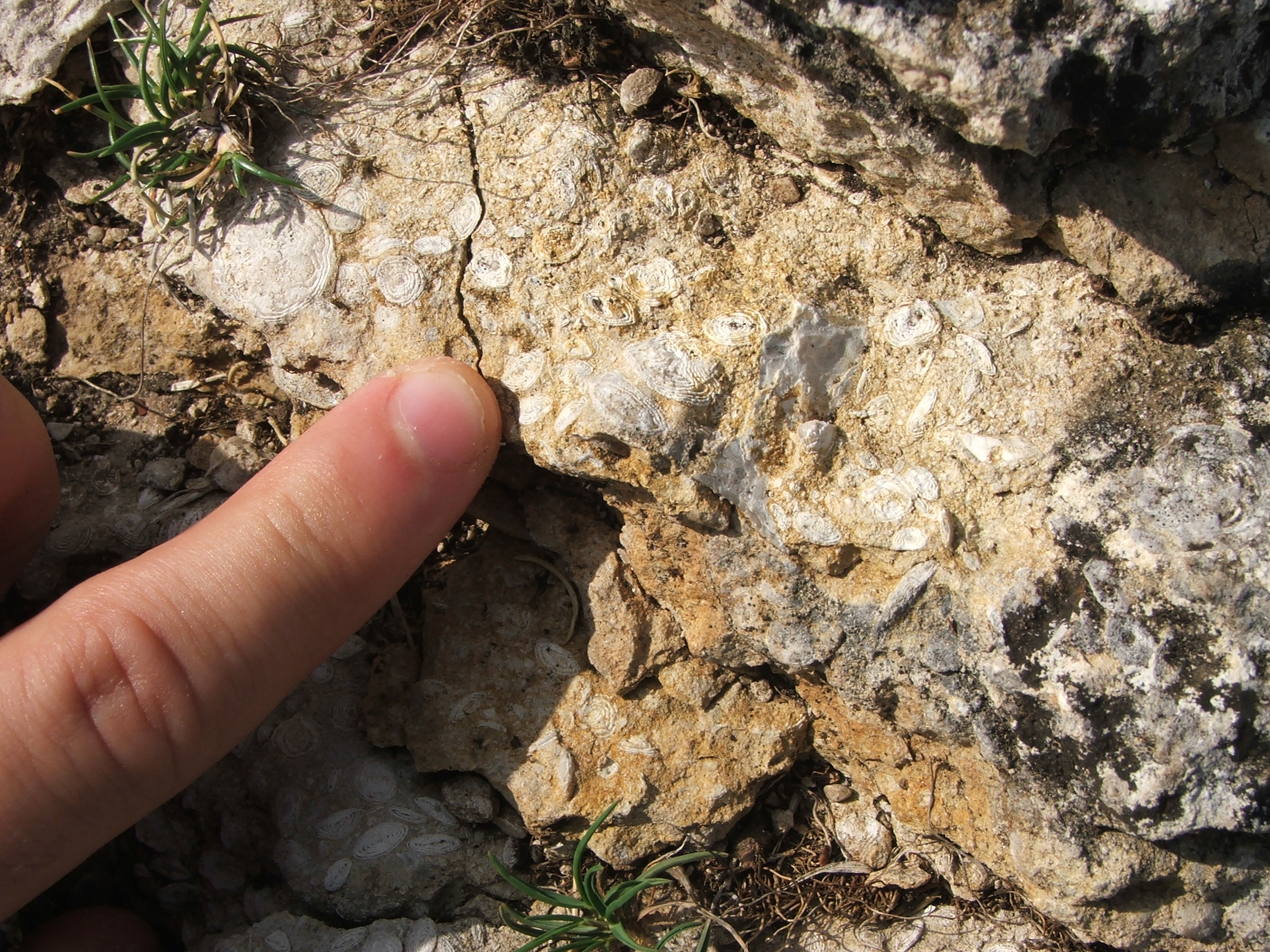
Fossil nummulites in Urbasa, Navarre

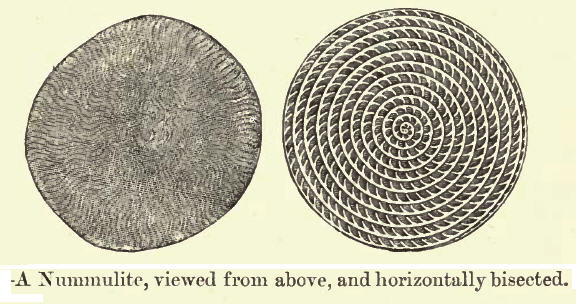
'A Nummilite, viewed from above, and horizontally bisected'

== Use ==
Because nummulites are very abundant, easy to recognize, and lived in certain biozones, they are used as guide fossils. It is worth highlighting that thanks to the appearance of Nummulites tavertetensis in the Shallow Bentic Zone 15 (SBZ 15), it was possible to date the oldest fossil remains of Sirenio in Western Europe found in a new paleontological site, in Santa Brígida, Amer (La Selva, Catalunya, Spain) near an old quarry of stone limestone with nummulites.
