= Cassidulinidae =

Cassidulinidae Temporal range: Paleocene - Recent

Scientific classification
- Domain: Eukaryota
- Clade: Sar
- Clade: Rhizaria
- Phylum: Retaria
- Subphylum: Foraminifera
- Class: Globothalamea
- Order: Rotaliida
- Superfamily: Cassidulinoidea
- Family: Cassidulinidae d'Orbigny, 1839

Subfamiies
- See text

Family of single-celled organisms

The Cassidulinidae is a family of Paleocene to recent benthic foraminifera (amoeboid protists) that make up part of the rotaliid superfamily Cassidulinoidea, characterized by calcareous test with biserially arranged chambers in a planispiral coil, at least in the early stage, but which later may uncoil.

The Cassidulinidae includes three subfamilies, the Cassidulininae, Ehrenbergininae, and Orthoplectinae, which contain as many as fourteen (14) genera.

== Bibliography ==
- A.R. Loeblich and H. Tappan, 1964. Sarcodina Chiefly "Thecamoebians" and Foraminiferida; Treatise on Invertebrate Paleontology, Part C Protista 2. Geological Society of America and University of Kansas Press.
- A. R. Loeblich & H.Tappan,1988 Forminiferal Genera and their Classification GSI E-book
