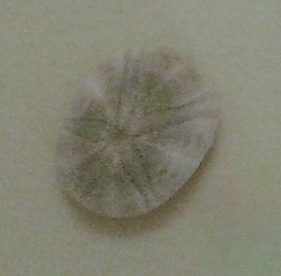
- Cassidulus mitis

Scientific classification
- Domain: Eukaryota
- Kingdom: Animalia
- Phylum: Echinodermata
- Class: Echinoidea
- Order: Cassiduloida
- Family: Cassidulidae

= Cassidulidae =

Family of sea urchins

Cassidulidae is a family of echinoderms belonging to the order Cassiduloida.

Genera:

- Anisopetalus
- Cassidulus Lamarck, 1801
- Echinobrinus Ébray, 1862
- Eurhodia Haime, 1853
- Galerolampas (Cotteau, 1889)
- Glossaster Lambert, 1918
- Paralampas Duncan & Sladen, 1882
- Rhyncholampas Agassiz, 1869
