= Cassiduloida =

Cassiduloida Temporal range: Lower Jurassic–Holocene

Scientific classification
- Kingdom: Animalia
- Phylum: Echinodermata
- Class: Echinoidea
- Order: Cassiduloida; L. Agassiz & Desor, 1847

Families
- Echinolampadidae; Neolampadidae

Order of sea urchins

Cassiduloida is an order of sea urchins. The group was extremely diverse with many families and species during the Mesozoic, but today, only seven extant species remain.

A 2019 phylogenetic systematics study by Souto et al. presented a revised classification of the cassiduloids, and hypothesised that the order probably originated in the Early Cretaceous.

== Description and characteristics ==
Cassiduloids have a rounded or slightly oval appearance, and look somewhat similar to heart urchins, although they are actually more closely related to the sand dollars. They are distinguished from other sea urchins by the presence of smaller intervening areas between the main ambulacral areas on the oral surface. They have no lantern as adults, and the petaloids are poorly developed or absent.

== List of families and genera ==
- family Cassidulidae L. Agassiz and Desor, 1847
  - genus Cassidulus Lamarck, 1801
  - genus Paralampas Duncan & Sladen, 1882
  - genus Rhyncholampas Agassiz, 1869
- family Eurhodiidae Souto et al., 2019
  - genus Australanthus Bittner, 1892
  - genus Eurhodia d'Archiac & Haime, 1853
  - genus Glossaster Lambert, 1918
  - genus Kassandrina Souto & Martins, 2018
- family Faujasiidae Lambert, 1905
- family Neolampadidae Lambert, 1918
- family Pliolampadidae Kier, 1962 †
- family Galeropygidae Lambert, 1911 †
  - genus Galeropygus Kier (1962) †
  - genus Eogaleropygus Kier (1962) †
