= Lipica Formation =

Mesozoic geologic formation in Italy

- Stratigraphic range: Santonian-Campanian; ~84–70.6 Ma
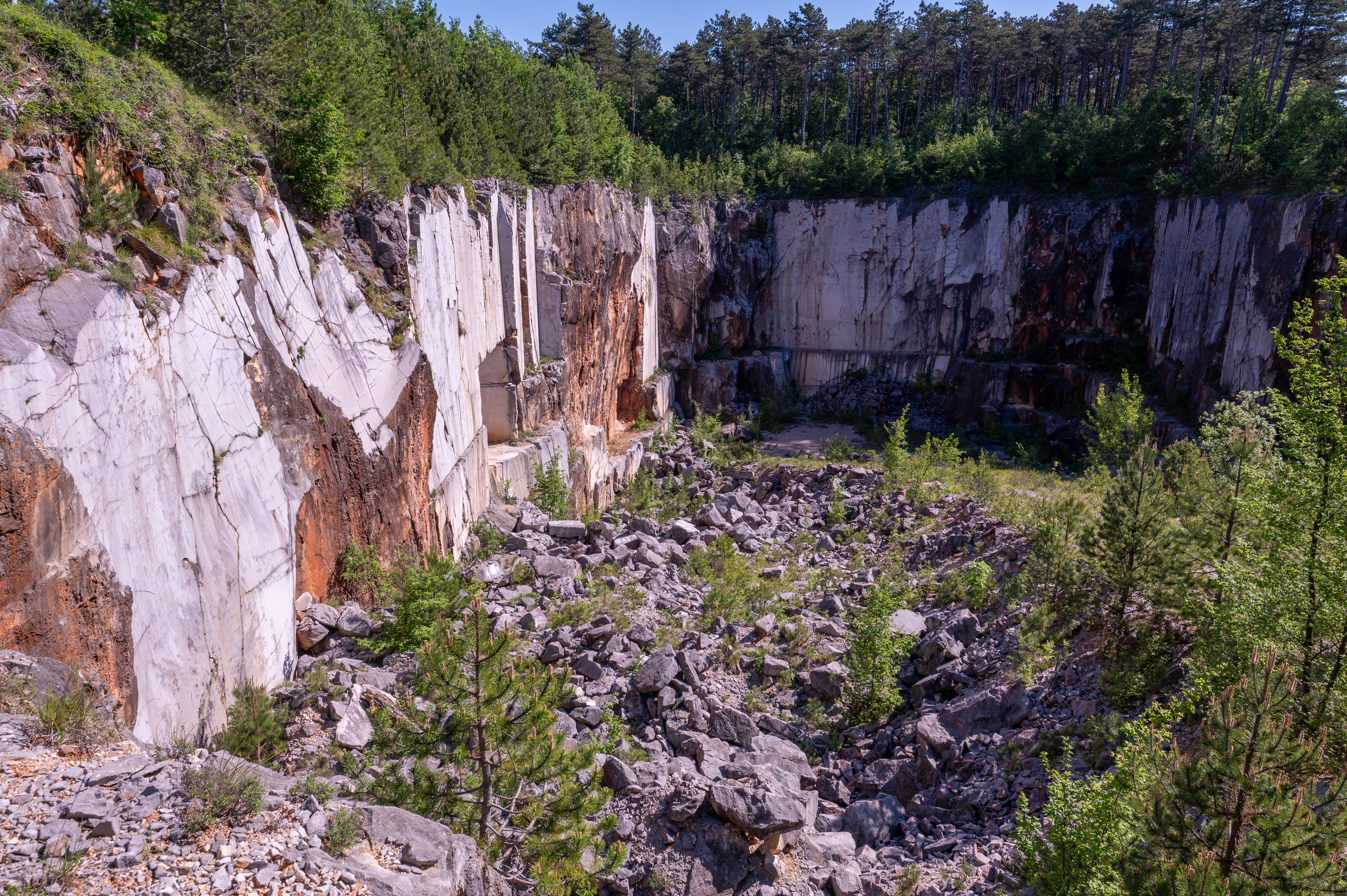
- Former Aurisina-type limestone quarry near Lipica
- Type: Geological formation
- Sub-units: Tomaj limestone; Zolla member
- Overlies: Sežana Formation
- Area: Friuli-Venezia Giulia

Lithology
- Primary: Limestone

Location
- Coordinates: 45.8°N 13.6°E
- Approximate paleocoordinates: 23.5°N 16.2°E
- Region: Trieste, Sežana
- Country: Italy, Slovenia

Type section
- Named for: Lipica, Sežana
- Lipica Formation (Italy)

The Lipica Formation (Also known as Upper Aurisina Formation, "Formazione di Monrupino", Trieste Karst Limestone formation, "Tomaj Limestone", "Repen formation" and "Lipiza formation", as well includes part of the informal "Liburnia formation") is a Mesozoic geologic formation in Italy and Slovenia. This limestones are found in the Trieste area and are of Late Cretaceous (Santonian-Campanian) age, being a local record of Carbonate platform limestones, historically quarried by cutting large blocks using steel wire, what has allowed more access to them, as numerous quarries allow excellent exposure. Due to being cut into large blocks and slabs, that usually end stored near the quarries, detailed, three-dimensional study of the rock's composition and fossils can be easily done.

== Characteristics ==
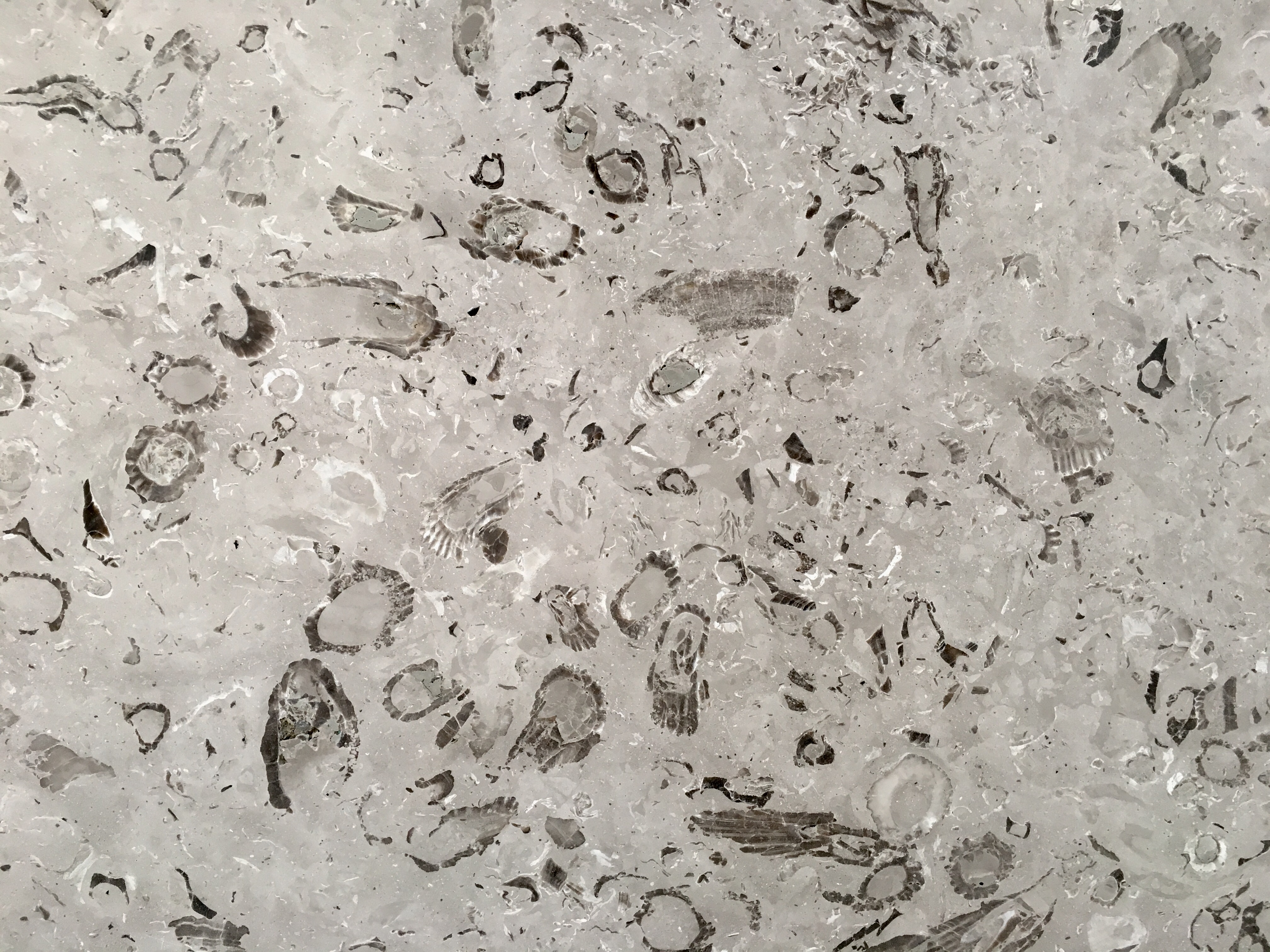
Detail of the Aurisina-type Limestone found in the Lipica formation

The Lipica formation usually has a light grey background, sometimes appearing hazelnut in color. It is known for its high purity, compactness, and uniformity. The quarries where it is extracted consist of thick, solid layers of stone. Different varieties of Aurisina marble are distinguished by shades of grey and the distribution, size, and orientation of the organic remains within the stone. Well-known varieties include Aurisina Fiorita, Aurisina Lumachella, Aurisina Chiara, and Roman Stone, among others.

Aurisina marble's chemical composition and physical properties make it ideal for use in architecture, both for structural and decorative purposes, as well as in statues and monuments. The stone is valued for its durability and aesthetic appeal in various applications.

== Historical Importance ==
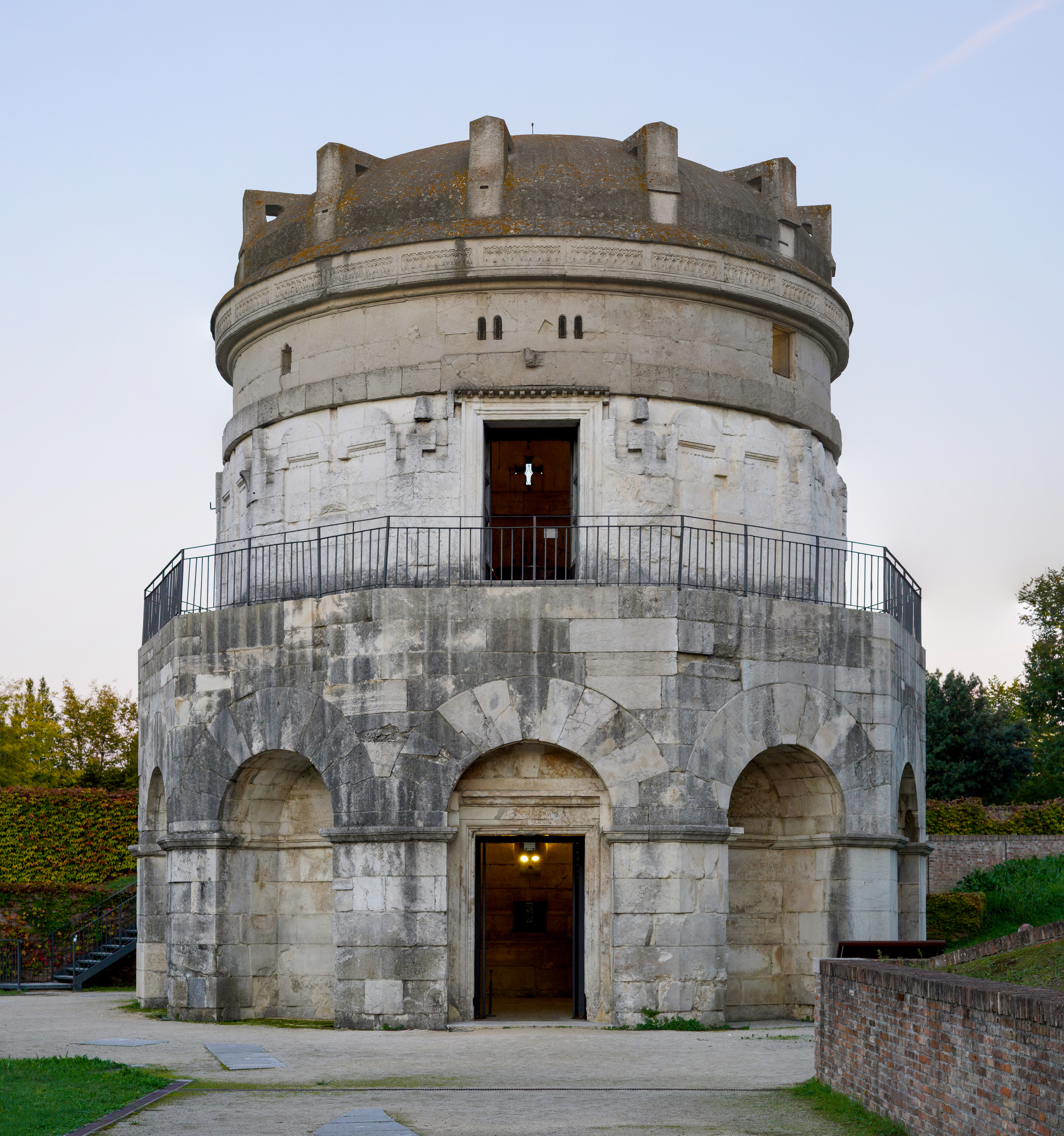
Mausoleum of Theodoric, that was built using Aurisina Limestone

The Lipica formation has been used since the Roman Republic. Evidence from ancient monuments in Aquileia, a Roman colony founded in 181 BC, suggests that quarrying began in the 1st century BC and continued until the 5th century AD. The stone was widely used in Aquileia for architectural elements, statues, and funerary monuments. The nearby city of Tergeste (modern Trieste) also made extensive use of Aurisina Limestone for public buildings and sculptures. Its use spread across northern Italy, with artifacts found as far as Pavia.

In the post-Roman period, Aurisina marble was notably used in the Mausoleum of Theodoric in Ravenna, built around 520 AD. However, its use declined during the medieval and Baroque periods. In Venice, it was replaced by Istrian stone, but in Trieste, it saw a revival in the 18th century as the city grew following the establishment of the free port by Emperor Charles VI. Notable examples of its use in Trieste include Palazzo Pitteri (1780), the Stock Exchange (1802), and the renovation of the Greek Orthodox Church of San Nicolò dei Greci (1819).

Aurisina Limestone's "golden age" came under the Austro-Hungarian Empire, particularly after the completion of the Southern Railway, connecting Trieste to Vienna. The stone was used in major projects throughout the empire, including the Parliament and Hofburg in Vienna, the State Opera in Budapest, and many buildings in cities like Graz, Munich, and Ljubljana. By 1890, the industry employed over 3,000 workers.

After Trieste's annexation to Italy in 1918, Aurisina Limestone was used in large-scale projects like the Military Shrine of Redipuglia and Milan's Central Station, where 38,000 tons were utilized. During this period, the marble also reached international markets, being used in Egypt and the United States.

In the post-war era, Aurisina Limestone continued to be popular in foreign markets, with notable projects including the Atlanta subway in the U.S., Berlin airport, and La Défense in Paris. In 1989, it was used for Milan Metro's Line 3. More recently, it has featured in prestigious architectural projects, such as Milan's CityLife Shopping District designed by Zaha Hadid and Turin's Lavazza headquarters. Internationally, it is used in projects across Europe, Asia, Australia, and the U.S.

== Paleoenvironment ==
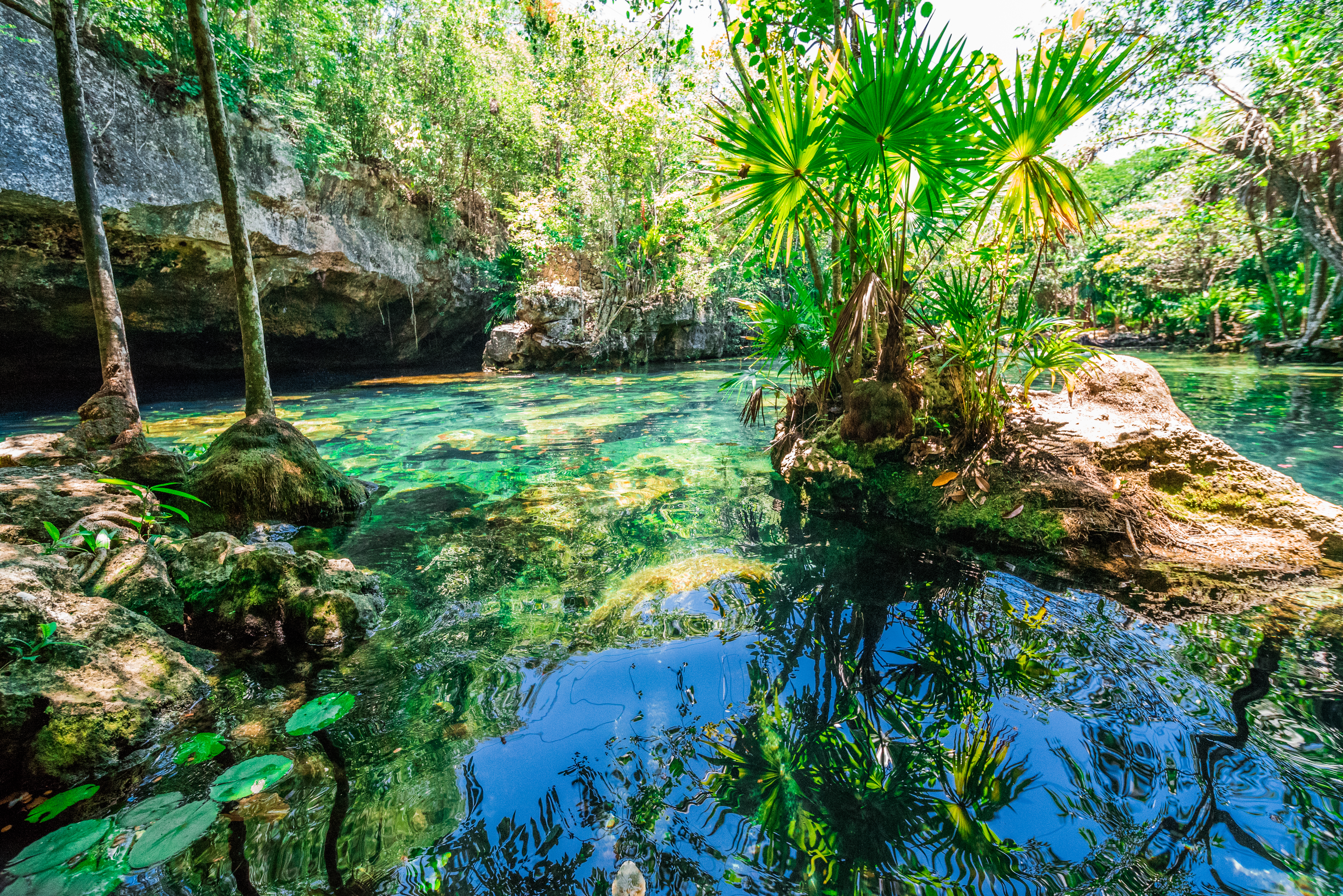
The Villaggio del Pescatore locality likely represented a carbonatic cenote were biota ended trapped.

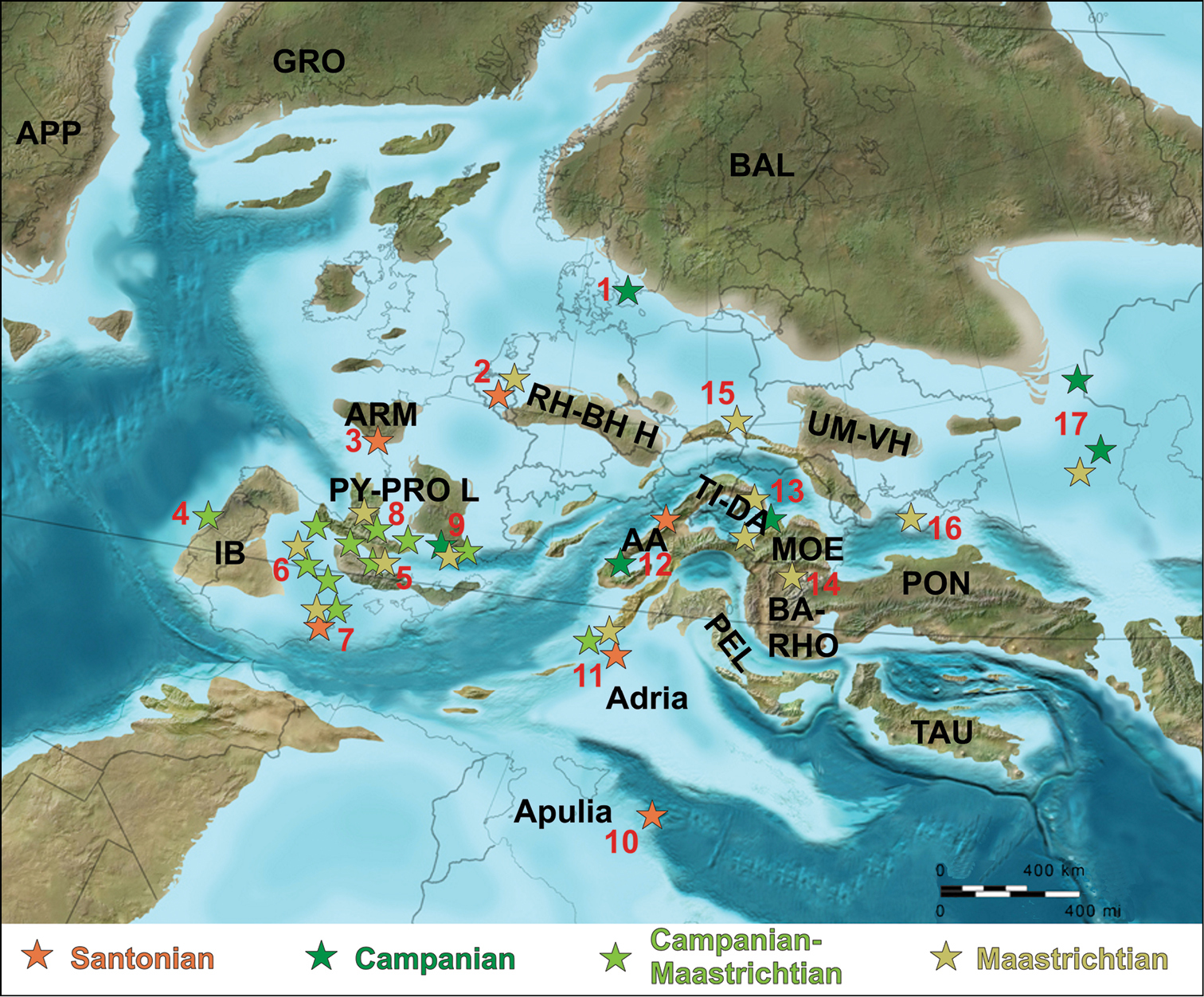
Santonian-Maastrichtian European fossil deposits, the 11 marks Calcare di Aurisina Area

The formation is characterized by lagoonal facies with episodes of higher energy and rare bivalve patch reefs, such as Chondrodonta and Rudists, which are found throughout the entire unit. The lower section, referred to as the "Zolla member" consists of bivalve-rich limestone, including rudists and Chondrodonta, as well as foraminiferal limestone, often interbedded with dolomitized dark wackestones. In the upper part of this member, pelagic limestone with Pythonella fossils is present. The main body of the Aurisina Limestone is characterized by peritidal carbonates, with some dark laminated facies, dominated by rudists, benthic foraminifera, cyanobacteria (Decastronema), and algae (Thaumatoporella). The Paleoenvironment of this unit is accepted to be a succession of emerged and shallow marine carbonate platform settings, including inner lagoons, high-energy shoals, tidal channels, and rudist accumulations The complex dolomitization and silicification in the region may be linked to a Monsoon climate with alternating wet and dry periods. Comparable dolomitization occurs across the Adriatic Platform, particularly in the Middle-Lower Cenomanian.

The Villaggio del Pescatore fossil site records a progressive environmental shift from a stable shallow-marine carbonate platform to a restricted, tectonically controlled basin. Initially, the area was a protected inner platform with shallow, calm seas, where early sediments accumulated in poorly oxygenated lagoons before giving way to better-ventilated marine conditions with normal salinity. Rudist-bearing facies developed during this stage, though their small size suggests ecologically stressed conditions. Later, higher-energy shallow-marine settings produced bioclastic sands and rudstones under well-oxygenated conditions. During the Lower Senonian, synsedimentary tectonic activity disrupted the platform, creating a small fault-bounded depression. Differential block movements led to erosion of emergent areas and collapse of basin margins, generating polygenic breccias composed of reworked platform material, including clasts showing oxidation, pedogenic alteration, and evidence of subaerial exposure. As tectonic activity decreased or relative sea level rose, clastic input diminished and the basin evolved into a quiet, restricted water body. The depression was progressively filled by finely laminated limestones deposited under low-energy conditions with limited circulation and oxygen-poor bottom waters. Seasonal lamination indicates cyclic sedimentation, consistent with fluctuating freshwater input and variable salinity in a brackish lagoon or shallow coastal lake. Microfossils, freshwater algae, plant traces, and slump structures reflect continental influence and ongoing instability along the basin margins. These anoxic conditions enabled exceptional preservation of vertebrate remains, including hadrosaurs, crocodyliforms, fish, and crustaceans. The surrounding bauxite and coal deposits indicate a humid climate and a karst landscape where surface water was scarce, making the basin a persistent water source. The depression likely functioned as a cenote-like feature that attracted animals, some of which drowned and were preserved at its stagnant base. A subsequent Upper Santonian transgression restored open-marine carbonate platform conditions, sealing the restricted basin deposits and preserving the unique fossil record. More updated works in the Villaggio del Pescatore outcrops revelated beautifully preserved tidal rhythmites that pointed to steady tidal deposition in a protected paralic flat, likely semidiurnal, accumulating over roughly 40 years across 14 meters of sediment. Geochemistry confirmed tidal origins, with dark packages reflecting wetter, runoff-heavy periods rich in organic matter and silt, while lighter ones indicate drier, better-oxygenated conditions with more aeolian influence. Salinity fluctuated between marine and freshwater inputs in this dynamic coastal setting. The fossils were rapidly buried by tidal drapes and stabilized by microbial mats, preserving soft tissues and preventing decay or scavenging. Larger debris-flow beds with reworked clasts record high-energy flood pulses that carried in carcasses and plants from inland. Finally, palaeoclimate models support a monsoon-dominated regime at the site's subtropical latitude, with strong seasonal rainfall and tropical cyclones driving the repeated flood events.

== Biota ==
Color key: Taxon / Reclassified taxon / Taxon falsely reported as present / Dubious taxon or junior synonym / Ichnotaxon / Ootaxon / Morphotaxon	Notes; Uncertain or tentative taxa are in small text; ~~crossed out~~ taxa are discredited.

=== Foranimifera ===
Unnamed Miliolidae and Rotaliidae tests are known from Villaggio del Pescatore.

Genus	Species	Location	Material	Description	Images
Accordiella	A conica	Slivia quarries; Villaggio del Pescatore	Tests	Benthic zone Chrysalidinidae	
Calveziconus	C. cf. lecalvezae	Villaggio del Pescatore	Tests	Benthic zone Dictyoconinae	
Cuneolina	C. spp.	Slivia quarries	Tests	Benthic zone Cuneolinidae	
Dicyclina	D. schlumbergeri; D. spp.	Slivia quarries; Villaggio del Pescatore	Tests	Benthic zone Dicyclinidae	
Fleuryana	F. adriatica	Villaggio del Pescatore	Tests	Benthic zone Charentiidae	
Goupillaudina	G. cf. daguini	Villaggio del Pescatore	Tests	Benthic zone Osangulariidae	
Keramosphaerina	K. tergestina	Slivia quarries; Villaggio del Pescatore	Tests	Benthic zone Keramosphaeridae	
Metacuvillierinella	M. sp.	Villaggio del Pescatore	Tests	Benthic zone Rhapydioninidae	
Moncharmontia	M. apenninica; M. spp.	Slivia quarries; Villaggio del Pescatore	Tests	Benthic zone Charentiidae	
Murciella	M. cuvillieri; M. spp.	Slivia quarries; Villaggio del Pescatore	Tests	Benthic zone Rhapydionininae	
Murgella	M. lata	Villaggio del Pescatore	Tests	Benthic zone Praerhapydionininae	
Neorotalia	N.? cretacea; N.? cf.cretacea	Villaggio del Pescatore	Tests	Benthic zone Pararotaliinae	
Pilatorotalia	P. pignattii; P. spp.	Villaggio del Pescatore	Tests	Benthic zone Calcarinidae	
Pseudocyclammina	P. sphaeroidea; P. spp.	Slivia quarries; Villaggio del Pescatore	Tests	Benthic zone Amijellinae	
Reticulinella	R. fleuryi; R. maxima; R. cf.maxima; R. scarsellai	Slivia quarries; Villaggio del Pescatore	Tests	Benthic zone Loftusiidae	
Scandonea	S. mediterranea; S. samnitica	Slivia quarries; Villaggio del Pescatore	Tests	Benthic zone Praerhapydionininae	

=== Bivalves ===
Genus	Species	Location	Material	Description	Images
Biradiolites	B. zucchii; B. fissicostatus; B. angulosus; B. rotundatus; B. cf.chaperi; B. sp.	Cava Romana; Lipica; Nanos Mountain; Sistiana; Villaggio del Pescatore	Isolated Shells	Rudist of the family Radiolitidae	
Bournonia	B. excavata; B. wiontzeki; B. cf. retrolata; B. spp.	Cava Romana; Lipica; Nanos Mountain	Isolated Shells	Rudist of the family Radiolitidae	
Chondrodonta	C. joannae; C. munsoni	Malchina; Visogliano; Hrusica; Nanos Mts	Isolated Shells	Scallop of the family Chondrodontidae	
Durania	D. acuticostata	Malchina; Visogliano	Isolated Shells	Rudist of the family Radiolitidae	
Eoradiolites	E. fleuriausus; E. liratus	Malchina	Isolated Shells	Rudist of the family Radiolitidae	
Gorjanovicia	G. lipparinii; G. cf. costata; G. sp.	Cava Romana; Lipica; Nanos Mountain; Villaggio del Pescatore	Isolated Shells	Rudist of the family Radiolitidae	
Hippuritella	H. castroi; H. sarthacensis; H. sulcatissima; H. cf.variabilis	Lipica	Isolated Shells	Rudist of the family Hippuritidae	
Hippurites	H. nabresinensis; H. spp.	Cava Romana; Villaggio del Pescatore	Isolated Shells	Rudist of the family Hippuritidae	Hippurites specimen
Katzeria	K. hercegovinaensis; K. sp.	Cava Romana; Lipica; Villaggio del Pescatore	Isolated Shells	Rudist of the family Radiolitidae	
Medeella	M. zignana	Lipica; Nanos Mountain	Isolated Shells	Rudist of the family Radiolitidae	
Neithea	N. fleuriausiana; N. spp.	Visogliano; Hrusica; Nanos Mts	Isolated Shells	Scallop of the family Neitheoidae	Neithea specimen
Paronaites	P. zuffardii	Malchina	Isolated Shells	Rudist of the family Radiolitidae	
Praelapeirouseia	P. vviontzeki; P. sp.	Lipica	Isolated Shells	Rudist of the family Radiolitidae	
Praeradiolites	P. acutilamellosus; P. (cf. Praeradiolites) fleuriausus; P. sp.	Visogliano; Sistiana	Isolated Shells	Rudist of the family Radiolitidae	
Rajka	R. sp.	Cava Romana	Isolated Shells	Rudist of the family Radiolitidae	
Radiolites	R. carsicus; R. galloprovincialis; R. praegalloprovincialis; R. spinulatus; R. peroni; R. cf. squamosus; R. cf. dari; R. spp.	Cava Romana; Lipica; Sistiana; Villaggio del Pescatore; Visogliano	Isolated Shells	Rudist of the family Radiolitidae	Radiolites specimen
Radiolitella	R. forojuliensis	Nanos Mountain	Isolated Shells	Rudist of the family Radiolitidae	
Requienia	R. ssp.	Sistiana	Isolated Shells	Rudist of the family Requieniidae	Requienia specimen
Sauvagesia	S. sharpei; S. tenuicostata; S. sp.	Malchina; Lipica; Visogliano; Villaggio del Pescatore	Isolated Shells	Rudist of the family Radiolitidae	
Vaccinites	V. braciensis; V. oppeli; V. archiaci; V. vredenburgi; V. sulcatus; V. cf. vredenburgi	Cava Romana; Lipica; Nanos Mountain	Isolated Shells	Rudist of the family Hippuritidae	

=== Cephalopoda ===
Genus	Species	Location	Material	Description	Images
Placenticeratidae indet.	Indeterminate	Sežana; Dobravlje	Isolated Jaws, aptychi, Shells, associated soft parts and gut contents	Ammonite	

=== Arthropods ===
Rare to common Ostracod fragile smooth shells are seen at Villaggio del Pescatore.

Genus	Species	Location	Material	Description	Images
Caridea indet.	Indeterminate	Villaggio del Pescatore; Polazzo	Multiple specimens	Shrimps resembling extant Neocaridina.	Modern Neocaridina
Cirolanidae indet.	Indeterminate	Villaggio del Pescatore	MCSNT 57229	Isopods similar to Cirolana.	Modern Cirolana
Heteroptera indet.	Indeterminate	Villaggio del Pescatore	MCSNT 72/88	Insects similar to modern Closterotomus.	Modern Closterotomus
Palaemon?	P. sp. P. cf.antonellae	Villaggio del Pescatore	Multiple specimens	Palaemonidae Shrimps similar to extant Palaemon.	Modern Palaemon

=== Cnidaria ===
Stony coral polyps or fragments are seen in Villaggio del Pescatore.

Genus	Species	Location	Material	Description	Images
Jellyfish indet.	Indeterminate	Dobravlje	BJ 1660, body impression	It has a diameter of 2.5 cm	
Hydnophora	H. multilamellosa	Lipica	Impressions	Merulinidae stony coral	Modern Hydnophora

=== Porifera ===
Genus	Species	Location	Material	Description	Images
Sarmentofascis	S. zamparelliae	Slivia quarries	Imprints	Cladocoropsidae Axinellidan	

=== Echinodermata ===
Abundant sea urchins spines/radioles and rare cases, as well Crinoid stem fragments/entrochi are known from Villaggio del Pescatore.

Genus	Species	Location	Material	Description	Images
Saccocomidae indet.	Indeterminate	Križ, southwest of Tomaj	Ossicles	Free living Crinoids	

=== Chondrichthyes ===
Genus	Species	Location	Material	Description	Images
Rhinobatos	R. sp. "F"	Dobravlje	BJ 1380, single complete specimen	A Guitarfish	Modern Rhinobatos

=== Bony Fish ===
At least 120 small fishes (2–5 cm, apparently monospecific) and others of larger size (less than 20 cm) are known from Villaggio del Pescatore.

Genus	Species	Location	Material	Description	Images
Anguilliformes indet.	Indeterminate	Polazzo	Single complete specimen	This would be the oldest anguilliform found in Italy	
Cypriniformes? indet.	Indeterminate	Polazzo	Several small complete and incomplete specimens	This determination still needs to be confirmed	
Enchodus	E. spp.	Polazzo; Dobravlje; Križ, southwest of Tomaj	Several small complete and incomplete specimens	A member of Enchodontidae	Reconstruction of Enchodus
Heckelichthys	H. microdon	Križ, southwest of Tomaj	BJ1521, complete specimen	A member of Ichthyodectidae, previously referred to Chirocentrites.	Reconstruction of Chirocentrites
Holocentridae indet.	Indeterminate	Polazzo	Several small complete and incomplete specimens	Represented mostly by small-sized specimens	
Hoplopteryx	H. stachei	Križ, southwest of Tomaj	BJ1566, subcomplete specimen	A member of Beryciformes.	Reconstruction of Hoplopteryx
Ichthyodectidae indet.	Indeterminate	Križ, southwest of Tomaj	BJ2198, subcomplete specimen; Referred BJ396, BJ1659, BJ1730, BJ2198		
Palaeobalistum?	P.? spp.	Polazzo	Several small complete and incomplete specimens	A member of Pycnodontidae	Palaeobalistum specimen
Parachanos	P. ssp.	Polazzo	Several isolated and articulated remains	A member of Chanidae. The attribution to this genus is dubious	
Polazzodus	P. coronatus; P. gridelli	Polazzo	Multiple complete specimens and isolated teeth	A member of Pycnodontidae	
Pycnodontiformes indet.	Indeterminate	Polazzo; Križ, southwest of Tomaj	Multiple complete specimens and isolated teeth	Some specimens have been referred to the genus Coelodus	
Rhynchodercetis	R. acutissimus; R. spp.	Polazzo; Križ, southwest of Tomaj	Multiple specimens, complete and incomplete	A member of Dercetidae. The most abundant genus at Polazzo	Rhynchodercetis specimen
Sloveniantriacanthus	S. saksi	Šepulje, east of Tomaj	PMS, VS-001, single specimen	A member of Cretatriacanthidae	

=== Turtles ===
Genus	Species	Location	Material	Description	Images
Chelonioidea indet.	Indeterminate	Polazzo	MPCM11398, part of a forelimb (humerus) and carapace (plate); MPCM11396, scattered remains among which a vertebra, parts of limbs and elements of the cintiscapularis can be recognized.	Overall about fifteen finds referable to sea turtles	Extant Chelonioidea
Testudinata indet.	Indeterminate	Villaggio del Pescatore; Križ, southwest of Tomaj	Incomplete specimens	Villaggio del Pescatore specimens suggest a large-sized taxon.	

=== Crocodiles ===
Genus	Species	Location	Material	Description	Images
Acynodon	A.adriaticus; A sp.	Villaggio del Pescatore; Kozina, Kras	MCNST 57248, A partial skeleton in anatomical connection. Multiple referred specimens: MCNST 57032, MCSNT 57031, MCSNT 57245, MCSNT 21.S239, MCSNT 21.S239	A small Durophagous crocodrylomorph	Acynodon skull
Crocodylia indet.	Indeterminate	Villaggio del Pescatore; Kozina, Kras	MCSNT 57033, possibly a rib; MCSNT 57035, mandibular symphysis; MCSNT 57036, anteroposteriorly long vertebra; MCSNT 57037, fragmented ventral osteodermal surface. Referred Multiple teeth		
Doratodon	D. cf. carcharidens; D. sp.	Villaggio del Pescatore; Kozina, Kras; Polazzo	MCSNT 57035, two partial dentaries; MPCMS97/118, isolated tooth crown; ACKK-D-8/088 & ACKK-D-8/081, teeth	Either a Notosuchian or a convergently evolved Paralligatoridae	D. cf. carcharidens MCSNT 57035
Notosuchia indet.	Indeterminate	Polazzo	MPCM 11720, shed tooth crown	The 1st record of the group on Italy, similar to Araripesuchus	

=== Pterosaurs ===
Genus	Species	Location	Material	Description	Images
Pterodactyloidea indet.	Indeterminate	Villaggio del Pescatore	MCSNT 13450, an alar metacarpal.	Shows a mix of features found in Pteranodon and some more basal pterodactyloids	Pteranodon

=== Dinosaurs ===
Genus	Species	Location	Material	Description	Image
Coelurosauria? indet.	Indeterminate	Križ, southwest of Tomaj	N° BJ 1742 – feather	Referral not confirmed	
Hadrosauroidea indet.	Indeterminate	Kozina, Kras	ACKK-D-8/20, 121, teeth	Dominant teeth at the locality	
Iguanodontidae? indet.	Indeterminate	Kozina, Kras	ACKK-D-8/25, 8/04, teeth	Resemble Iguanodontid Teeth, but can belong to a convergently evolved Rhabdodontid	
Ornithopoda indet.	Indeterminate	Kozina, Kras	ACKK-D-8/21-Z1, teeth	Different from Rhabdodon	
Tethyshadros	T. insularis	Villaggio del Pescatore	SC 57021, type specimen ("Antonio"), virtually complete specimen; SC 57022 ("Primus"), partial, articulated forelimbs. The tail and potentially other skeletal elements are still in situ; SC 57023, isolated left pubis; SC 57024, partial scapula; SC 57025, cervical vertebra; SC 57026 ("Secundus"), complete but heavily crushed skull, also a large unprepared block containing the proximal vertebral column; SC 57027, sacral vertebrae; SC 57028, a series of ten, fully prepared, articulated distal caudal vertebrae; SC 57247 ("Bruno"), articulated skeleton; SC 57256, isolated rib; SC 57257, proximal end of a femur; A series of thirteen, articulated, distal caudal vertebrae; Large articulated elements still in situ ("Tertius"); Large articulated elements ("Zdravko")	A small hadrosauromorph dinosaur	"Antonio" specimen of Tethyshadros
Theropoda indet.	Indeterminate	Villaggio del Pescatore	SC 57030, "arctometatarsalian metatarsal"; Another specimen may represent an epiphysis of a long bone, perhaps of a femur.	Likely a small Abelisaur	

=== "Algae" ===
Freshwater Characeae gyrogonites, oogonia, and whorls/verticilli are found in Villaggio del Pescatore.

Genus	Species	Location	Material	Description	Images
Decastronema	D. kotori	Villaggio del Pescatore	Imprints	Mat-forming blue-green algae	
Thaumatoporella	T. ssp.	Slivia quarries; Villaggio del Pescatore	Imprints	Potentially an encrusting Green algae	

=== Flora ===
Palynology of the Villaggio del Pescatore section has been studied, dominated by a few gymnosperms and several angiospermous pollen types. The distribution of plants in this outcrop includes pollen from tropical lowland plants (palms, shrubs); pollen from taller trees (conifers) from more temperate uplands; possible rhizoliths (root/stem traces of land plants along basin margins).

Genus	Species	Location	Material	Description	Images
Araucarites	A.? sp.	Dobravlje; Kazlje; Križ	Isolated Cones	Conifer cones related with Araucariaceae	
Brachyphyllum	B. "sp. nov."; B. spp.	Dobravlje; Kazije; Križ; Polazzo	Isolated Branched Shoots	Conifer shots related with Araucariaceae or Hirmeriellaceae.	
Cunninghamites	C. cf. elegans	Polazzo	Isolated Branched Shoots	Conifer shots related with Cupressaceae	
Dicotyledoneae indet.	Indeterminate	Polazzo	Isolated Leaves		
Equisetites	E. sp.	Križ	Stems	Stems of Equisetales	
Eucalyptus	E. sp.	Kazlje; Križ	Isolated Leaves	Angiosperms leaves of Eucalypteae	Eucalyptus
Filicales indet.	Indeterminate	Kazije	Pinnae		
Frenelopsis	F. ssp.	Villaggio del Pescatore; Polazzo	Isolated Branched Shoots	A Conifer, member of Hirmeriellaceae. The most abundant foliar remain locally	
Ginkgoales? indet.	Indeterminate	Polazzo	Isolated Leaves		
Magnoliaephyllum	M. sp.	Kazlje	Isolated Leaves	A Flowering Plant, suggested to belong to Magnoliaceae	
Pagiophyllum	P. "sp. nov."; P. ssp.	Dobravlje; Kazlje; Križ; Polazzo	Isolated Branched Shoots	Conifer shots related with Araucariaceae or Hirmeriellaceae.	
Pinophyta indet.	Indeterminate	Dobravlje; Kazlje; Križ; Villaggio del Pescatore	Isolated Branched Shoots	Includes at least a new genus and 2 species	
Papillopollis	P. aradeaensis	Villaggio del Pescatore	Pollen	Resembles extant members of the wind-pollinated Juglandales-Myricales	
Sassafras	S. sp.	Kazlje	Isolated Leaves	Angiosperms leaves of Lauraceae	Sassafras
Sphenolepis	cf.S. spp.	Polazzo	Isolated Cones	Conifer cones related with Cupressaceae	

== Image Gallery ==
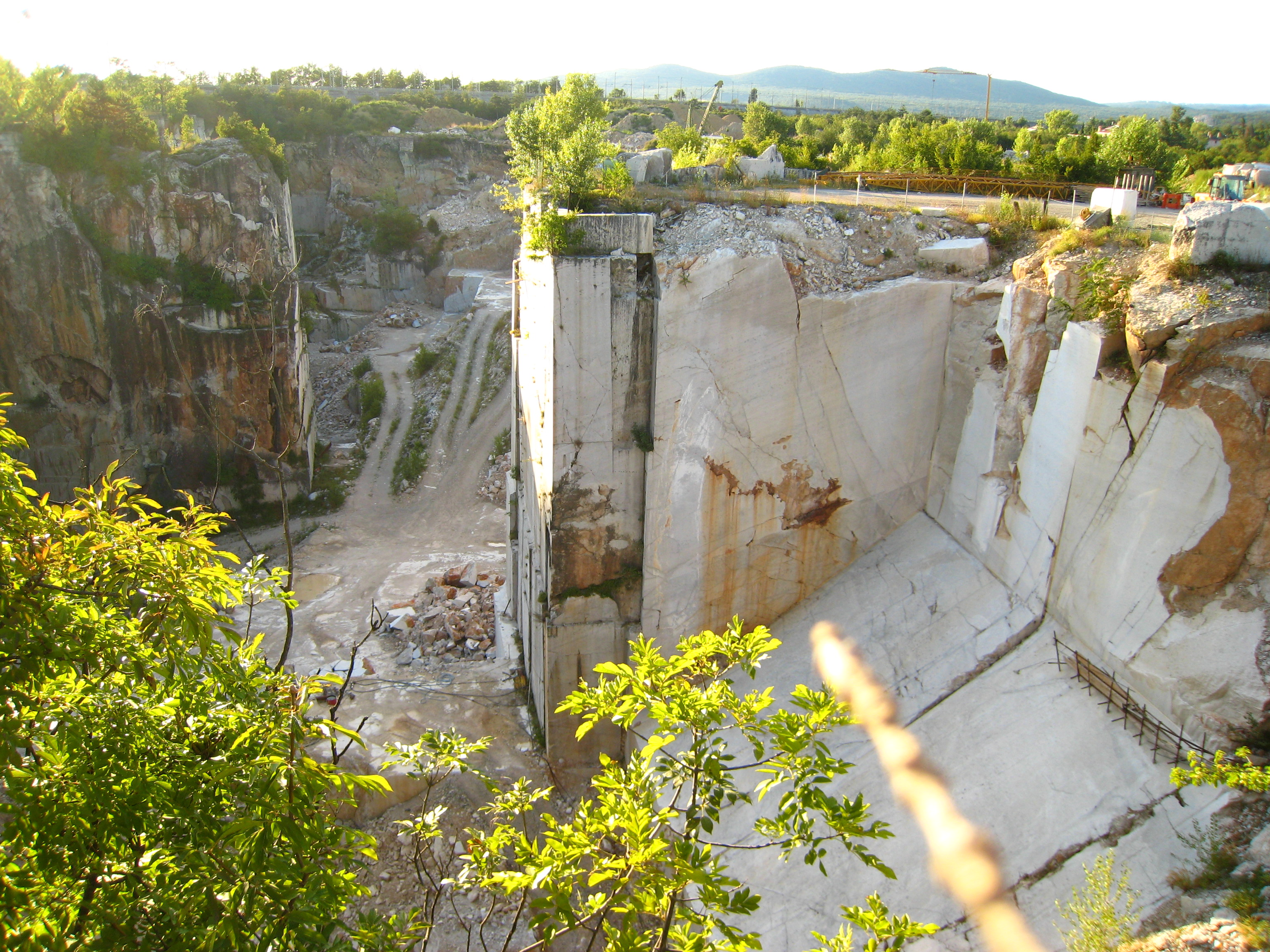
Aurisina Roman Mine

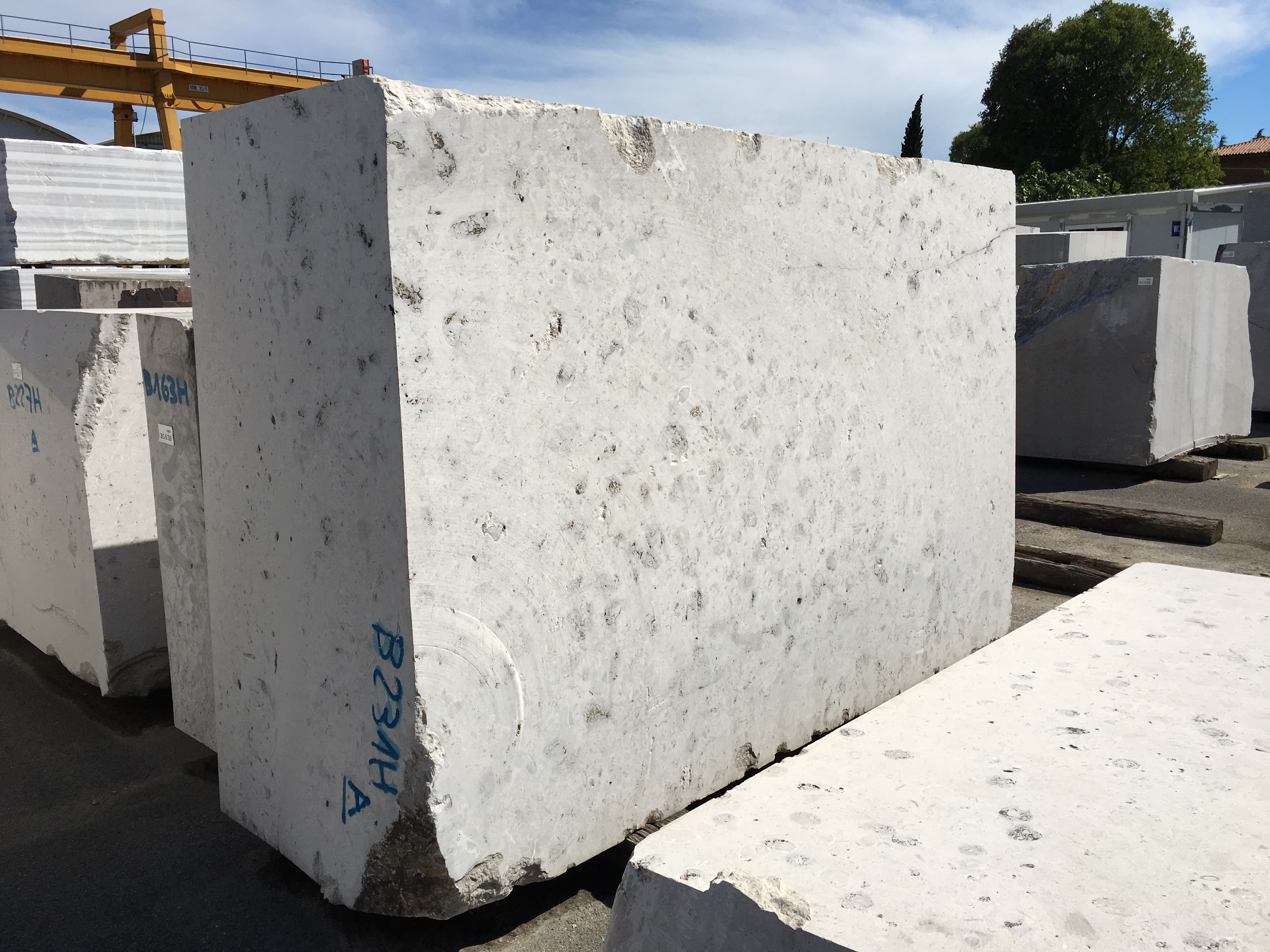
Aurisina Fiorita

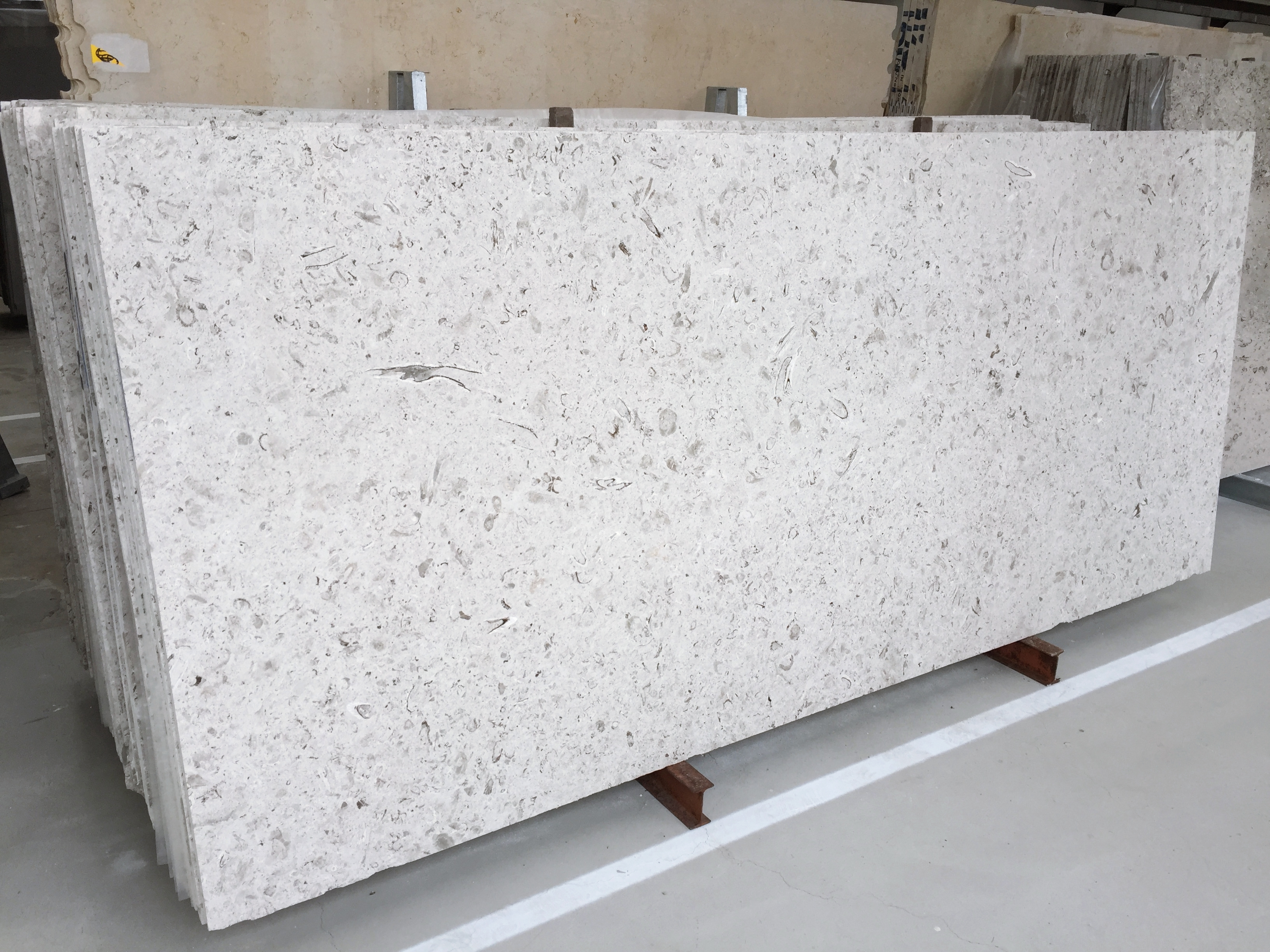
Polished Aurisina Fiorita

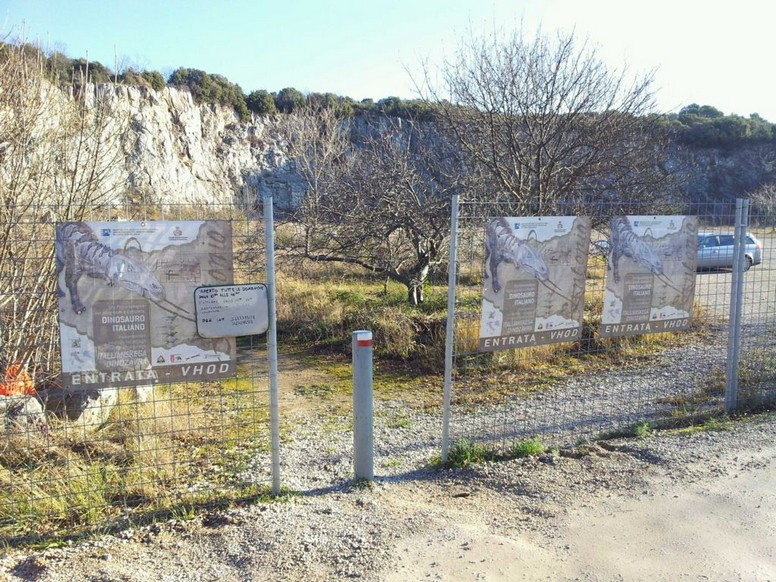
Finding site of Tethyshadros

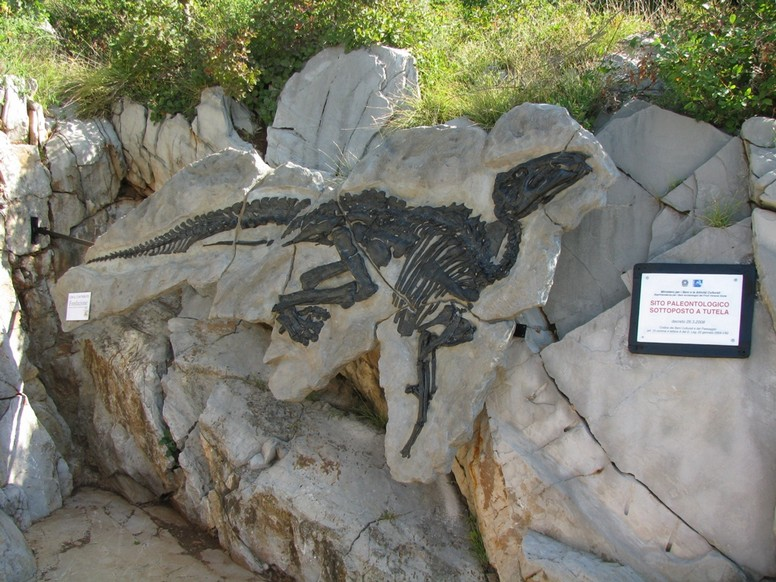
Reconstruction of a Tethyshadros skeleton near his finding site.

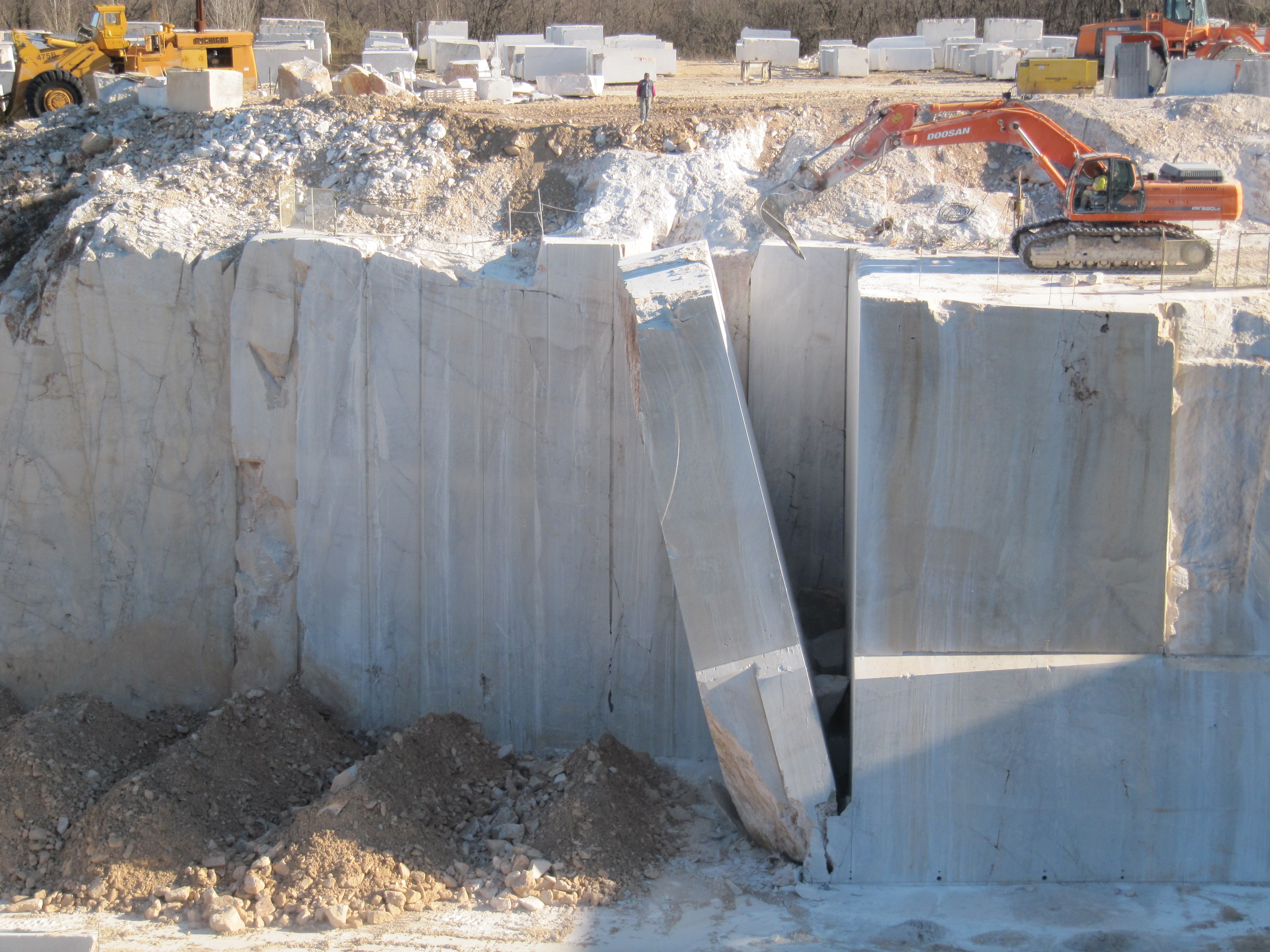
Aurisina limestone being exploited

== See also ==
- List of dinosaur-bearing rock formations
  - List of stratigraphic units with few dinosaur genera
  - Lagerstätte
