= Pseudospirocyclina =

Pseudospirocyclina Temporal range: Kimmeridgian

Scientific classification
- Domain: Eukaryota
- Clade: Sar
- Clade: Rhizaria
- Phylum: Retaria
- Subphylum: Foraminifera
- Class: Globothalamea
- Order: Loftusiida
- Family: †Spirocyclinidae
- Genus: †Pseudospirocyclina; Hottinger, 1967

Genus of single-celled organisms

Pseudospirocyclina is a genus of large planispirally coiled agglutinated benthic forams with a complex interior known from the upper Jurassic (Kimmeridgian) of Portugal and Morocco.

As Foraminifera, Pseudospirocyclina are biologically, granuloreticulose Sarcodina, retariate rhizarian, there for a protozoan. As a member of the Spirocyclinidae the genus is related to genera like Spirocyclina, Sornayina, and Spiraloconulus
