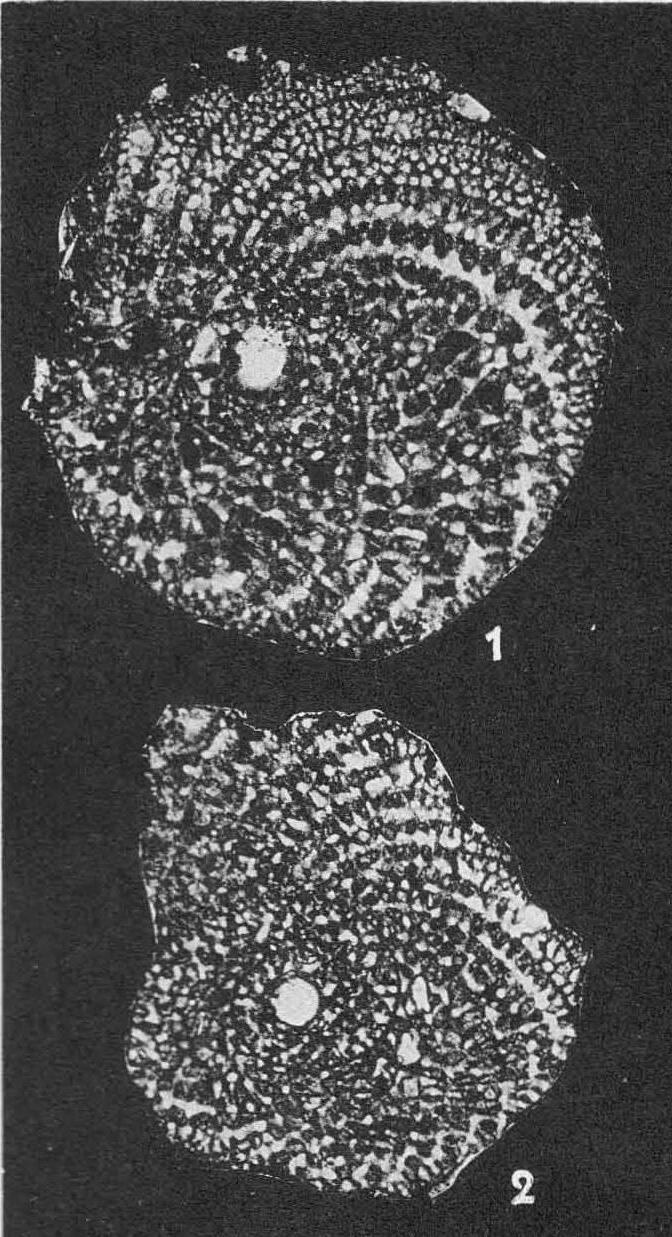
- Anchispirocyclina henbesti

Scientific classification
- Domain: Eukaryota
- Clade: Sar
- Clade: Rhizaria
- Phylum: Foraminifera
- Class: Globothalamea
- Order: Loftusiida
- Family: †Spirocyclinidae
- Genus: †Anchispirocyclina; Jordan and Applin, 1952

= Anchispirocyclina =

Anchispirocyclina Temporal range: Late Jurassic–Early Cretaceous

Extinct genus of single-celled organisms

Anchispirocyclina is a genus of agglutinated discoidal forams known from the upper Jurassic (lower Kimmeridgian) to the lower Cretaceous (lower Valanginan) of Europe, north Africa, USA (North Carolina) and Cuba.

The test of Anchispirocyclina is discoidal, thin and often slightly undulating. The early stage is close coiled, later flaring some becoming circular in outline. Walls are microgranular to finely agglutinated. Chambers have complex interiors produced by a network of rafters and beams. Those near the median plane have an irregular labyrinthic structure produced by radial pillars or buttresses extending from septum to septum between adjacent apertural openings.

Spirocyclina, Haurania and Martiguesia are related genera.
