= Reissella =

Reissella Temporal range: Cenomanian

Scientific classification
- Domain: Eukaryota
- Clade: Sar
- Clade: Rhizaria
- Phylum: Retaria
- Subphylum: Foraminifera
- Class: Globothalamea
- Order: Loftusiida
- Family: †Spirocyclinidae
- Genus: †Reissella; Hamaoui, 1963
- Species: †R. ramonensis

Binomial name
- †Reissella ramonensis Hamaoui, 1963

Genus of forams

Reissella is a monotypic genus of benthic forams with a test of microgranular calcite from the upper Cretaceous (Cenomanian) of Israel. The test starts off planispirally enrolled and involute but later may tend to uncoil and flare with as many as ten chambers in the final whorl. The interior as with other spirocyclinids is complex. Other Late Cretaceous spirocyclinids include Qataria and Sornayina.
