= Saudia (foraminifera) =

Saudia Temporal range: Paleocene to MiddleEocene

Scientific classification
- Domain: Eukaryota
- Clade: Sar
- Clade: Rhizaria
- Phylum: Retaria
- Subphylum: Foraminifera
- Class: Globothalamea
- Order: Loftusiida
- Family: †Spirocyclinidae
- Genus: †Saudia; Henson, 1948

Genus of single-celled organisms

Saudia is a genus of large discoidal to reniform (kidney shaped) forams, with a relatively thick test and complex interior, composed of agglutinated matter, or microgranular calcite. Saudia is known from the Paleocene to middle Eocene of Saudi Arabia, Iraq and the Balkans. Related genera include Vania and Sornayina.
