= Martiguesia =

Martiguesia Temporal range: Santonian

Scientific classification
- Domain: Eukaryota
- Clade: Sar
- Clade: Rhizaria
- Phylum: Retaria
- Subphylum: Foraminifera
- Class: Globothalamea
- Order: Loftusiida
- Family: †Spirocyclinidae
- Genus: †Martiguesia; Maync, 1959

Genus of single-celled organisms

Martiguesia is a genus of agglutinated benthic forams from the Upper Cretaceous (Santonian) of France. The test is free, the early stage planispirally coiled, becoming nearly straight during later growth. The agglutinated wall is externally imperforate, the interior with a coarse alveolar network. Chambers are subdivided and almost completely filled by irregular radial pillars. The aperture, cribrate.

As a member of the Spirocyclinidae Martiguesia is related to Haurania, Anchispirocyclina, Streptocyclammina, and of course Spirocyclina.
