= Timidonella =

Timidonella Temporal range: Toarcian ~183–182 Ma

Scientific classification
- Domain: Eukaryota
- Clade: Sar
- Clade: Rhizaria
- Phylum: Retaria
- Subphylum: Foraminifera
- Class: Globothalamea
- Order: Loftusiida
- Family: †Spirocyclinidae
- Genus: †Timidonella; Bassoullet et al 1974

Genus of single-celled organisms

Timidonella is a genus of large middle Jurassic forams, with microspheric tests up to 8 millimetres (0.31 in) in diameter. Smaller megalospheric tests may be fan-shaped or kidney-shaped to discoidal with breadths to slightly over 2 mm and a constant thickness equal to that of the proloculus. Chambers are numerous. The wall, microgranular calcareous, agglutinated.

Timidonella has been found in the middle Jurassic of France, Italy, Sardinia, Iran, and Madagascar. Spiraloconulus, Streptocyclammina, and Spirocyclina are among related genera.
