= Streptocyclammina =

Streptocyclammina Temporal range: Jurassic

Scientific classification
- Domain: Eukaryota
- Clade: Sar
- Clade: Rhizaria
- Phylum: Retaria
- Subphylum: Foraminifera
- Class: Globothalamea
- Order: Loftusiida
- Family: †Spirocyclinidae
- Genus: †Streptocyclammina; Hottinger, 1967

Genus of single-celled organisms

Streptocyclammina is a genus of benthic forams with a flattened test from the Jurassic. The test (or shell) usually starts off streptospiral (coiled irregularly) hence the name, and becomes planispiral in the mature stage. Chambers are numerous per whorl, whorls become rapidly larger in peneropline fashion (as common in Pereroplis). Sutures between whorls are slightly indented, the periphery rounded. The wall is finely agglutinated, externally imperorate, internally with massive septa perforated by numerous apertures.

Streptocyclammina has been found in Jurassic sediments in Morocco, Italy, and the Balkans. Spiraloconulus and Timidonella are other spirocyclinids from the same general region, but are limited to the middle Jurassic.
