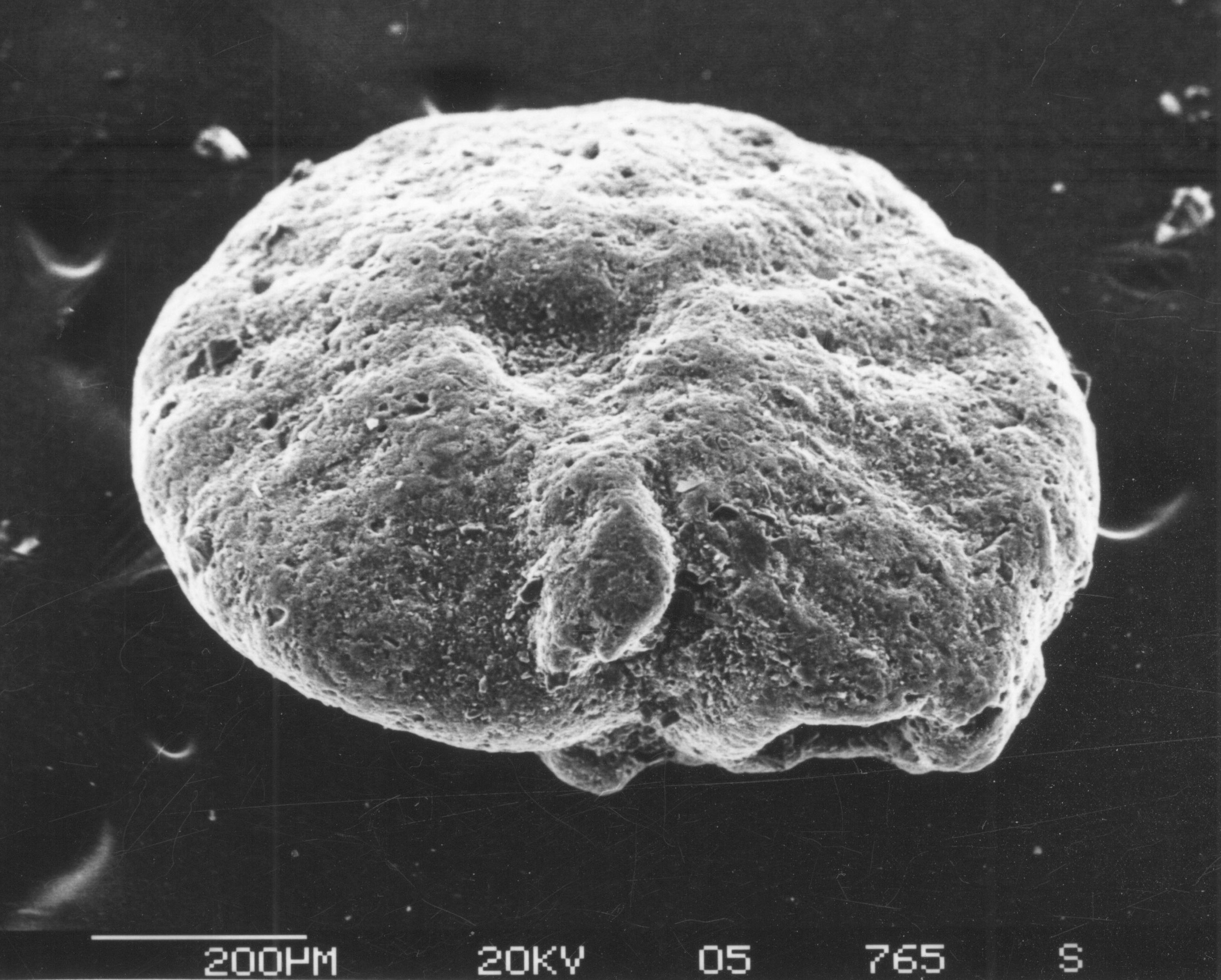
- Cyclammina pusilla

Scientific classification
- Domain: Eukaryota
- Clade: Sar
- Clade: Rhizaria
- Phylum: Retaria
- Subphylum: Foraminifera
- Class: Globothalamea
- Order: Loftusiida
- Family: Cyclamminidae
- Subfamily: Cyclammininae
- Genus: Cyclammina; Brady, 1876

Species
- Several, including: Cyclammina bradyi Cushman, 1910; Cyclammina cancellata Brady, 1879 (type); Cyclammina compressa Cushman, 1917; †Cyclammina elegans Cushman & Jarvis 1932; Cyclammina orbicularis Brady, 1884; †Cyclammina pacifica Beck, 1943; †Cyclammina pauciloculata Brady, 1879; Cyclammina pusilla Brady, 1884; Cyclammina senegalensis Colom, 1956

= Cyclammina =

Cyclammina Temporal range: 140.2–0 Ma

Genus of single-celled organisms

Cyclammina is a genus of foraminifers in the family Cyclamminidae. Most species are extinct, but there are a few that are extant.

C. elegans was a species from the Cretaceous of Trinidad and from New Zealand.

== See also ==
- List of prehistoric foraminifera genera
