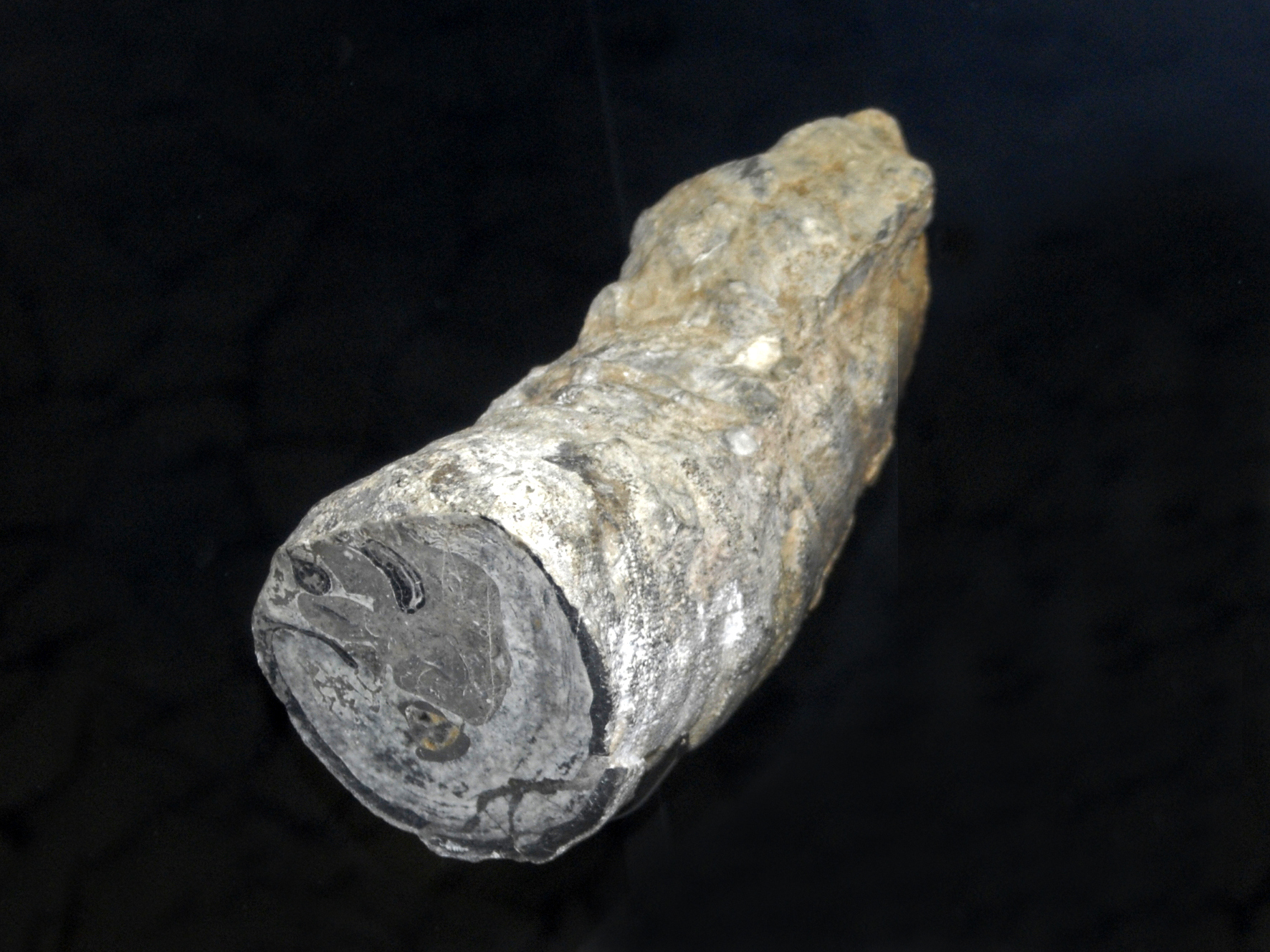
- Specimen of Hippurites cornuvaccinum from Greece

Scientific classification
- Domain: Eukaryota
- Kingdom: Animalia
- Phylum: Mollusca
- Class: Bivalvia
- Order: †Hippuritida
- Family: †Hippuritidae
- Genus: †Hippurites
- Species: †H. cornuvaccinum

Binomial name
- †Hippurites cornuvaccinum Bronn, 1831

= Hippurites cornuvaccinum =

Hippurites cornuvaccinum Temporal range: Late Cretaceous

Extinct species of bivalve

Hippurites cornuvaccinum is a fossil saltwater clam, an extinct marine bivalve mollusk in the family Hippuritidae. These fossils occur in the Late Cretaceous deposits of southern Europe.
