= Qataria =

Qataria Temporal range: Late Cretaceous

Scientific classification
- Domain: Eukaryota
- Clade: Sar
- Clade: Rhizaria
- Phylum: Retaria
- Subphylum: Foraminifera
- Class: Globothalamea
- Order: Loftusiida
- Family: †Spirocyclinidae
- Genus: †Qataria; Henson, 1948

Genus of single-celled organisms

Qataria is a genus of large benthic forams with a discoidal test over 6mm in diameter fully developed. The interior is complex with chambers divided into chamberlets. The wall is of microgranular calcite.

Qataria is known from the Upper Cretaceous (upper Cenomanian or Turonian) of the Qatar peninsula, Arabia, where first found.
