= Spiraloconulus =

Spiraloconulus Temporal range: Middle Jurassic

Scientific classification
- Domain: Eukaryota
- Clade: Sar
- Clade: Rhizaria
- Phylum: Retaria
- Subphylum: Foraminifera
- Class: Globothalamea
- Order: Loftusiida
- Family: †Spirocyclinidae
- Genus: †Spiraloconulus; Allemann and Schroeder, 1980

Genus of single-celled organisms

Spiraloconulus is a genus of middle Jurassic forams with a coarsely agglutinated, microgranular, calcareous wall. The test is large, conical to cylindrical, coiled somewhat straight; the early coiled stage results in a flattened apex. Distinctly coiled microspheric tests are as much as 2 mm wide and 1.6 mm high. Megalospheric tests are smaller, up to 1.5 mm high and 1.1 mm wide.

Spiraloconulus is known from the middle Jurassic of France, Italy, Sardinia, and Arabia. Timidonella is another spirocyclind from the same time, but with a wider distribution.
