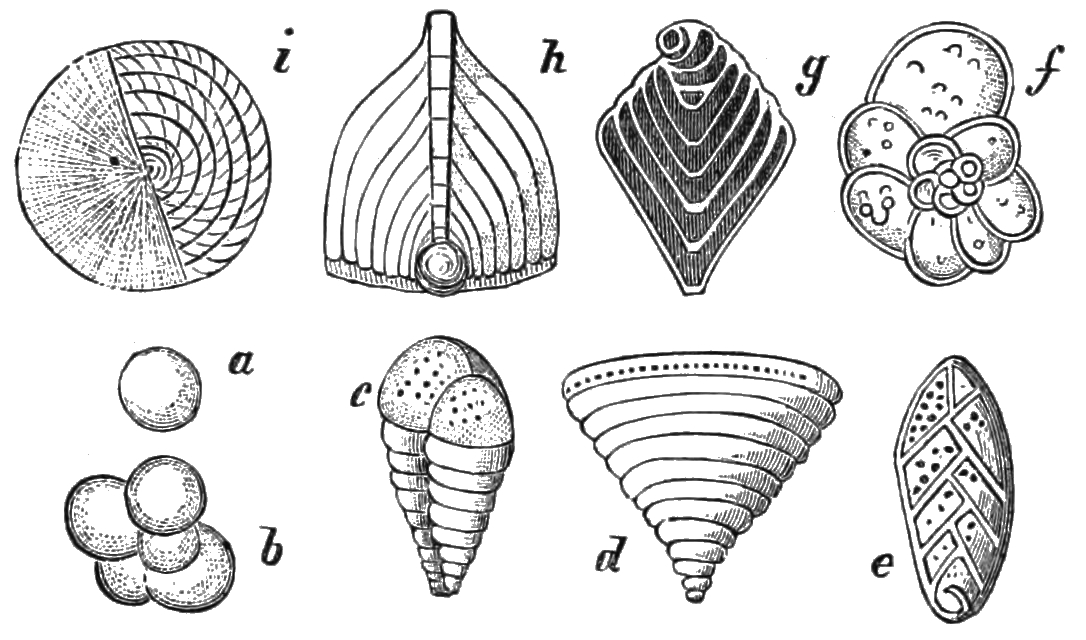
- Illustration of Popular Science Monthly, Volume 10, 1876 - Rhizopods, fig. d: Cuneolina pavonia

Scientific classification
- Domain: Eukaryota
- Clade: Sar
- Clade: Rhizaria
- Phylum: Retaria
- Subphylum: Foraminifera
- Class: Globothalamea
- Order: Loftusiida
- Family: †Cuneolinidae
- Genus: †Cuneolina d'Orbigny, 1839

Species
- †Cuneolina bermudezi Palmer, 1938; †Cuneolina camposaurii Sartoni & Crescenti, 1962; †Cuneolina cojimarensis Palmer, 1938; †Cuneolina conica d'Orbigny, 1850; †Cuneolina cylindrica Henson, 1948; †Cuneolina dominicana Bermúdez, 1949; †Cuneolina elegans Rzehak, 1891; †Cuneolina fleuriausa d'Orbigny, 1850; †Cuneolina hensoni Dalbiez, 1958; †Cuneolina immatura He, 1982; †Cuneolina laurenti Sartoni & Crescenti, 1962; †Cuneolina parva Henson, 1948; †Cuneolina pavonia d'Orbigny, 1846; †Cuneolina trinitensis Stead, 1951; †Cuneolina walteri Cushman & Applin, 1947

= Cuneolina =

Cuneolina Temporal range: 163.5–66.0 Ma

Extinct genus of single-celled organisms

Cuneolina is an extinct genus of prehistoric foraminifera in the family Cuneolinidae with species from the Jurassic and Cretaceous.

Name brought to synonymy

- Cuneolina angusta Cushman, 1919, a synonym for Textulariella angusta (Cushman, 1919)

== See also ==
- List of prehistoric foraminifera genera
