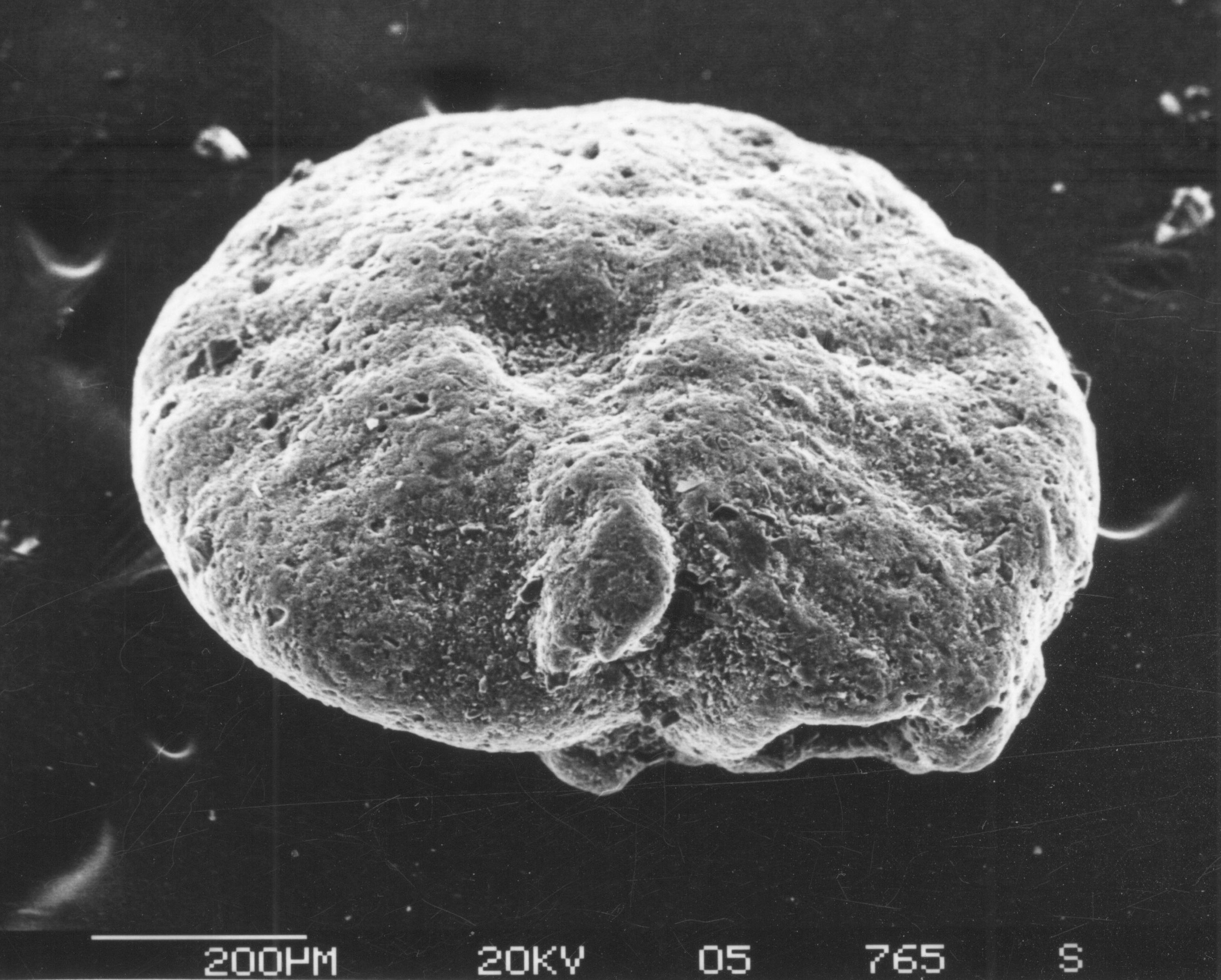
- Cyclammina pusilla

Scientific classification
- Domain: Eukaryota
- Clade: Sar
- Clade: Rhizaria
- Phylum: Retaria
- Subphylum: Foraminifera
- Class: Globothalamea
- Order: Loftusiida
- Suborder: Loftusiina
- Superfamily: Loftusioidea
- Family: Cyclamminidae; Loeblich and Tappan, 1982

Subfamilies
- Alveolophragmiinae; Buccicrenatinae; Choffatellinae; Cyclammininae; Hemicyclammininae; Pseudochoffatellinae

= Cyclamminidae =

Cyclamminidae Temporal range: Early Jurassic - Recent

Family of single-celled organisms

Cyclamminidae is a family of Foraminifera in the order Loftusiida, ex textulariid subfamily Cyclammininae in the Treatise on Invertebrate Paleontology Part C, Protista 2.

Cyclamminids are characterized by enrolled, involute, agglutinated tests in which the walls have an outer imperforate layer and an inner alveolar layer. Apatures are interiomarginal or near the septal base.

Includes the subfamilies Cyclammininae, Alveolophragmiinae, Buccicrenatinae, Choffatellinae, Hemicyclammininae, and Pseudochoffatellinae, as listed.
