= Vania (foraminifera) =

Vania Temporal range: Late Paleocene

Scientific classification
- Domain: Eukaryota
- Clade: Sar
- Clade: Rhizaria
- Phylum: Retaria
- Subphylum: Foraminifera
- Class: Globothalamea
- Order: Loftusiida
- Family: †Spirocyclinidae
- Genus: †Vania; Sirel and Gûndûz, 1985

Genus of single-celled organisms

Vania is a genus of benthic forams from the upper Paleocene of Turkey with a large discoidal test up to 6.5mm in diameter. The microspheric test begins with a short planispiral stage, later chambers spreading successively from flabelliform (fan-shaped) to reniform (kidney-shaped) and finally annular. The interior is subdivided by radial primary beams intercalated with secondary beams. The wall finely agglutinated, imperforate; aperture, two alternating rows of pores on the periphery.
