= Haurania =

Haurania Temporal range: Middle Lias to Bathonian

Scientific classification
- Domain: Eukaryota
- Clade: Sar
- Clade: Rhizaria
- Phylum: Retaria
- Subphylum: Foraminifera
- Class: Globothalamea
- Order: Loftusiida
- Family: †Spirocyclinidae
- Genus: †Haurania; Hensen, 1948

Extinct genus of single-celled organisms

Haurania is a genus of elongated, finely agglutinated benthic foraminifera included in the Spirocyclinidae. The test is free, starting with a brief planispiral coil followed by a straight uncoiled stage. The exterior is imperforate, the interior divided by radial septula or beams, perpendicular to the septa and outer wall. The aperture is cribrate, a series of openings on the terminal face.

This genus is known from the lower and middle Jurassic of China, Iraq and Morocco.
