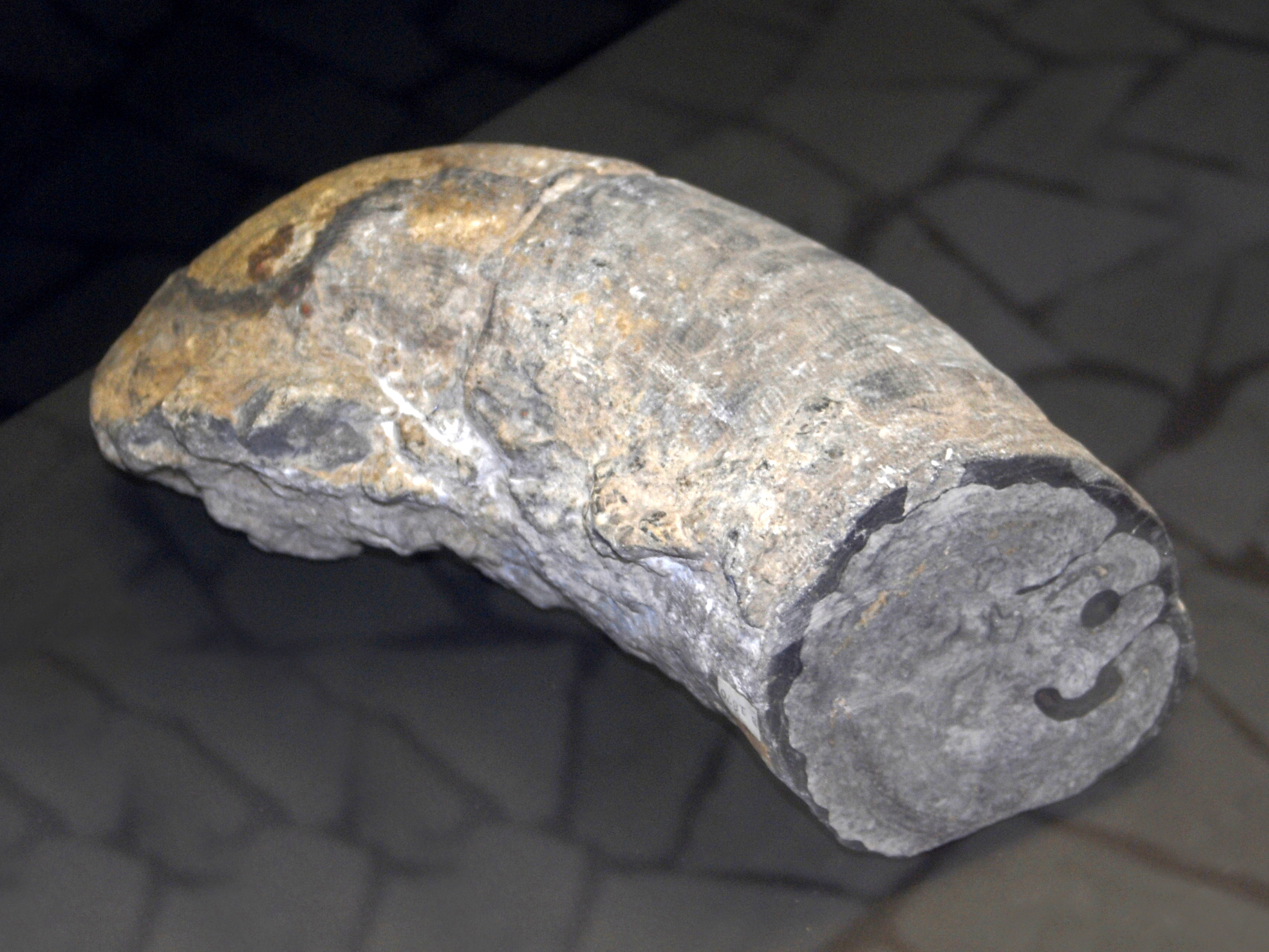
- Specimen of Hippurites atheniensis from Greece

Scientific classification
- Domain: Eukaryota
- Kingdom: Animalia
- Phylum: Mollusca
- Class: Bivalvia
- Order: †Hippuritida
- Family: †Hippuritidae
- Genus: †Hippurites
- Species: †H. atheniensis

Binomial name
- †Hippurites atheniensis Ktenas, 1907

= Hippurites atheniensis =

Hippurites atheniensis Temporal range: Late Cretaceous

Extinct species of bivalve

Hippurites atheniensis is an extinct species of fossil saltwater clam, a marine bivalve mollusk in the family Hippuritidae. These fossils occur in the Late Cretaceous deposits of Greece, Serbia, Dalmatia, Istria, Bosnia and Herzegovina, Slovenia, Bulgaria and Italy.
