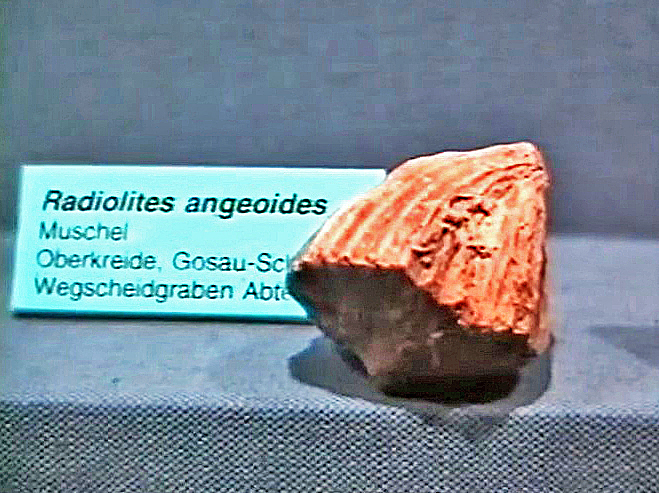
- Fossil of Radiolites angeoides. Salzburg, Haus der natur

Scientific classification
- Kingdom: Animalia
- Phylum: Mollusca
- Class: Bivalvia
- Order: †Hippuritida
- Family: †Radiolitidae
- Genus: †Radiolites; Lamarck, 1801

= Radiolites =

Radiolites Temporal range: Cretaceous

Genus of bivalves

Radiolites is an extinct genus of rudist bivalves in the family Radiolitidae. The genus was established by Lamarck in 1801. Its type species is Ostracites angeiodes, described by Picot de Lapeirouse in 1781.

== Description ==
Radiolites had strongly unequal valves. The right valve was generally conical to cylindrical-conical, while the left valve was low and conical with an undulating margin. The right valve had an outer shell layer with cellular structures and commonly prominent ribs. Radial bands were also present on the shell.

A prominent ligamental ridge is one of the characteristics used to distinguish the genus.

== Fossil record ==
Radiolites is known from the Cretaceous. Published studies report the genus from strata ranging from the Early Aptian to the middle Maastrichtian.

Fossils attributed to Radiolites have been reported from numerous regions, including Europe, Africa, Asia and the Americas.

One species, Radiolites acutocostata, is known from early to middle Campanian deposits. Its right valve is cylindrical to cylindro-conical and possesses a prominent ligamental ridge. The shell exterior has angular ribs, while its ventral and posterior radial bands differ in shape and size.

== Species ==
Species historically assigned to the genus include:

- † Radiolites acutocostata (Adkins, 1930)
- † Radiolites angeoides (Delapeirouse)
- † Radiolites carsicus Caffau et al., 1995
- † Radiolites dario Catullo, 1834
- † Radiolites macroplicatus Whitfield, 1897
- † Radiolites praegalloprovincialis Toucas, 1908
- † Radiolites spongicola Astre, 1954

The classification of some species historically placed in Radiolites has subsequently been revised. For example, R. macroplicatus has also been assigned to Sauvagesia by some authors.
