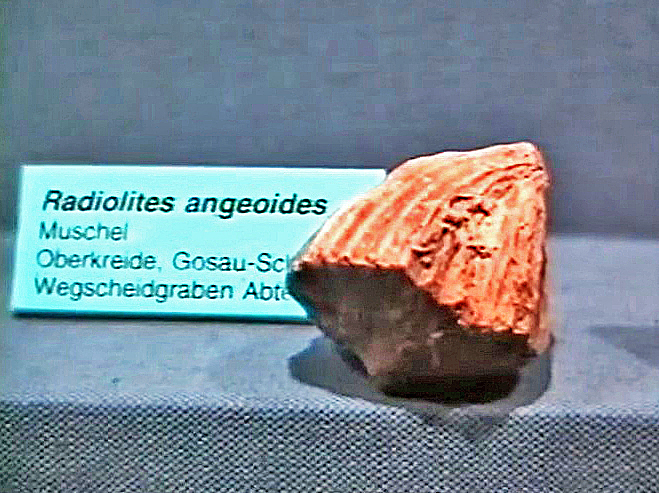
- Fossil of Radiolites species

Scientific classification
- Domain: Eukaryota
- Kingdom: Animalia
- Phylum: Mollusca
- Class: Bivalvia
- Order: †Hippuritida
- Suborder: †Hippuritidina
- Superfamily: †Radiolitoidea
- Family: †Radiolitidae; Gray, 1848

Synonyms
- Chiapasellidae Alencaster 1971; Duraniidae Yanin 1989; Osculigeridae Yanin 1989

= Radiolitidae =

Radiolitidae Temporal range: Jurassic - Cretaceous

Family of bivalves

Radiolitidae is a family of rudists in the order Hippuritida.

== Fossil record ==
These rudists lived between the Jurassic and the Cretaceous (age range: 130.0 to 66.043 million years ago).

== Genera ==
Genera within this family include:

- † Agriopleura Kühn 1832
- † Apulites Tavani 1958
- † Archaeoradiolites Fenerci-Masse et al. 2006
- † Biradiolites d'Orbigny 1850
- † Bournonia Fischer 1887
- † Bystrickya Lupu 1976
- † Chiapasella Müllerried 1931
- † Colveraia Klinghardt 1921
- † Contraspira Mitchell 2009
- † Darendeella Karacabey-Oztemür 1976
- † Distefanella Parona 1901
- † Dubertretia Cox 1965
- † Durania Douvillé 1908
- † Eoradiolites Douvillé 1909
- † Favus Laviano and Skelton 1992
- † Fossulites Astre 1957
- † Fundinia Sladić-Trifunović and Pejović 1977
- † Glabrobournonia Morris and Skelton 1995
- † Gorjanovicia Polšak 1967
- † Hacobjanella Atabekjan 1976
- † Horehronia Andrusov 1976
- † Jerinella Pejović 1988
- † Joufia Boehm 1897
- † Katzeria Slišković 1966
- † Kuehnia
- † Kurtinia Karacabey-Oztemuer 1980
- † Lapeirousella Milovanović 1938
- † Lapeirousia Bayle 1878
- † Laskarevia Milovanović 1984
- † Macgillavryia Rojas et al. 1995
- † Maghrebites Pons 2012
- † Medeela
- † Medeella Parona 1924
- † Milovanovicia Polšak 1967
- † Monopilarites Philip and Platel 1998
- † Neoradiolites Milovanović 1935
- † Orestia Lupu 1972
- † Osculigera Kühn 1933
- † Parabournonia Douvillé 1927
- † Paronaites Pons 2011
- † Paronella Wiontzek 1934
- † Petkovicia Kühn and Pejović 1959
- † Polsakia Slišković 1982
- † Potosites Pons et al. 2010
- † Praelapeirousia Wiontzek 1934
- † Praeradiolites Douvillé 1902
- † Pseudopolyconites Milovanović 1935
- † Pseudosabinia Morris and Skelton 1995
- † Radiolitella Douvillé 1904
- † Radiolites Lamarck 1801
- † Rajka
- † Robertella Cossmann 1903
- † Rosellia Pons 1977
- † Sauvagesia Bayle 1886
- † Sphaerulites Lamarck 1819
- † Tampsia Stephenson 1922
- † Tekirdagia Ozdikmen 2010
- † Thyrastylon Chubb 1956
- † Vautrinia Milovanović 1938

== Gallery ==
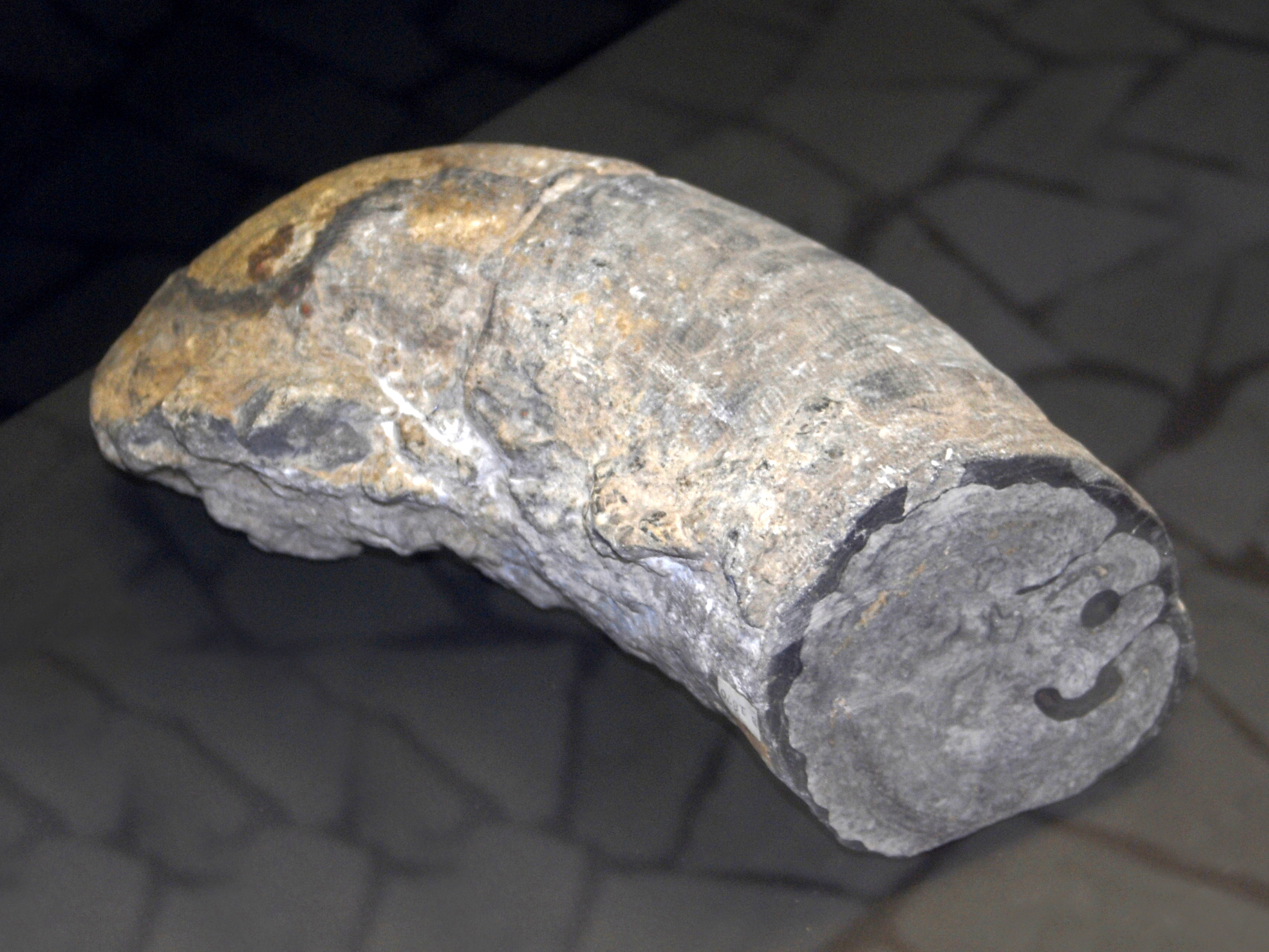
Hippurites atheniensis

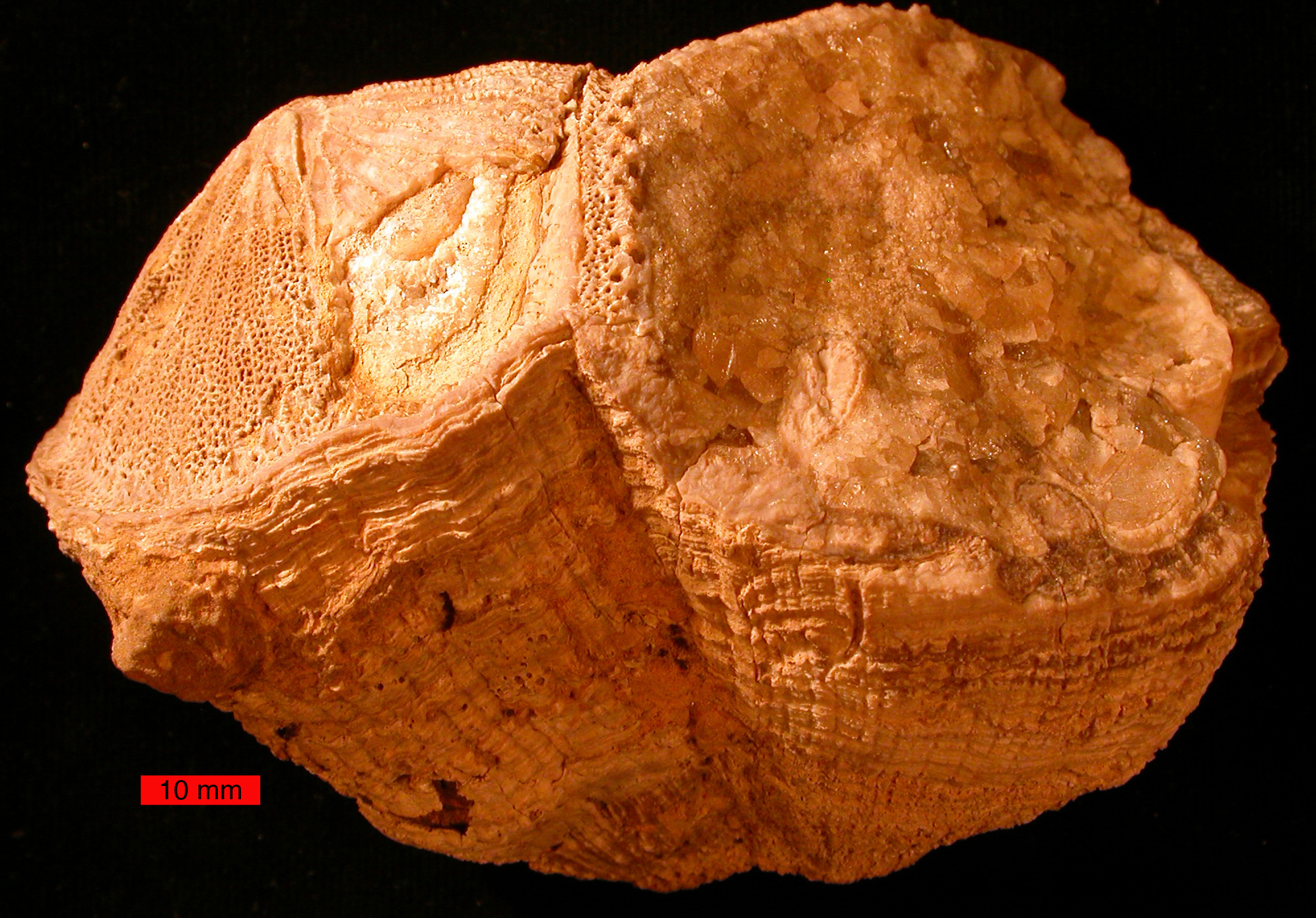
Vaccinites species

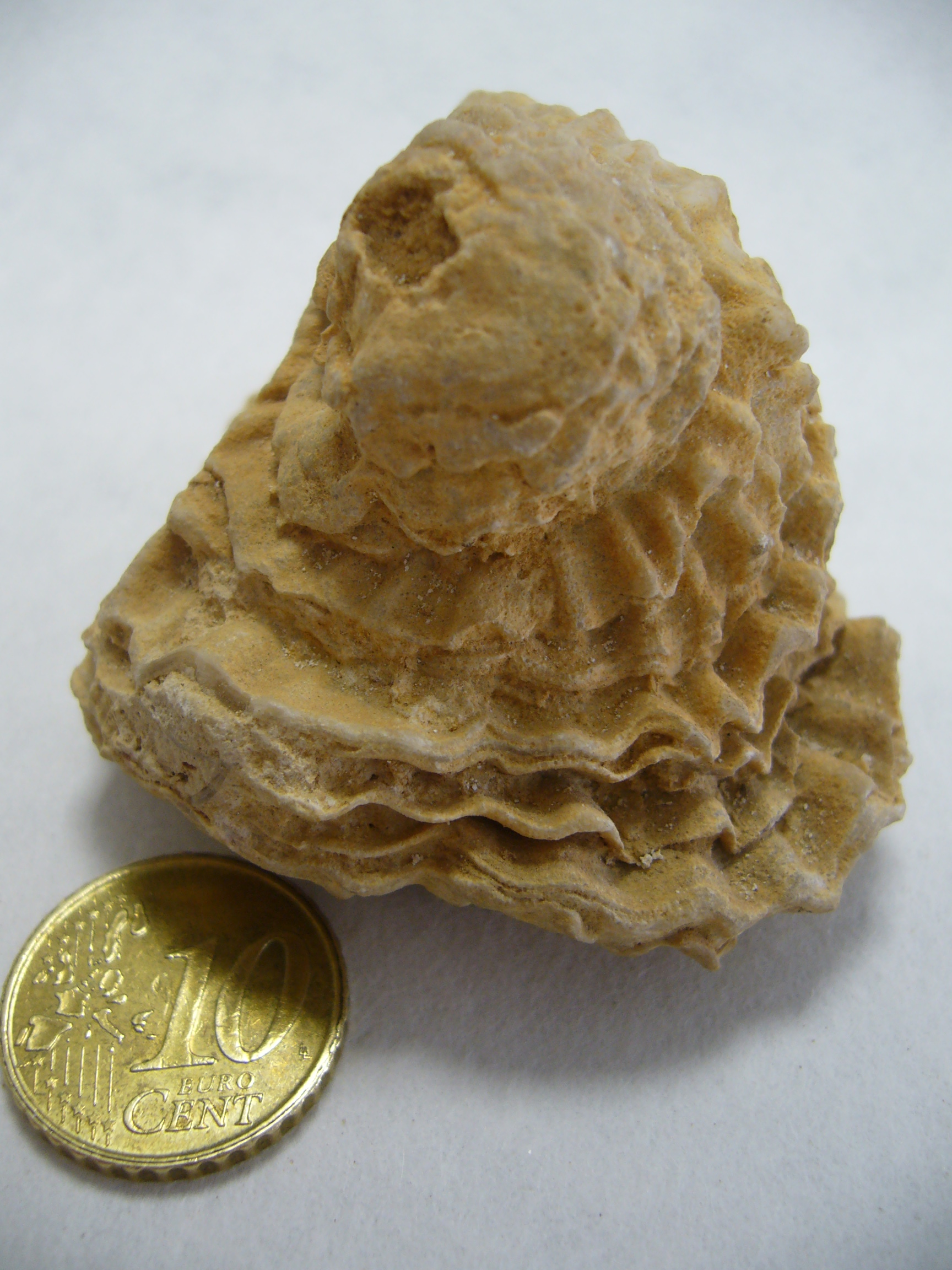
Radiolites species
