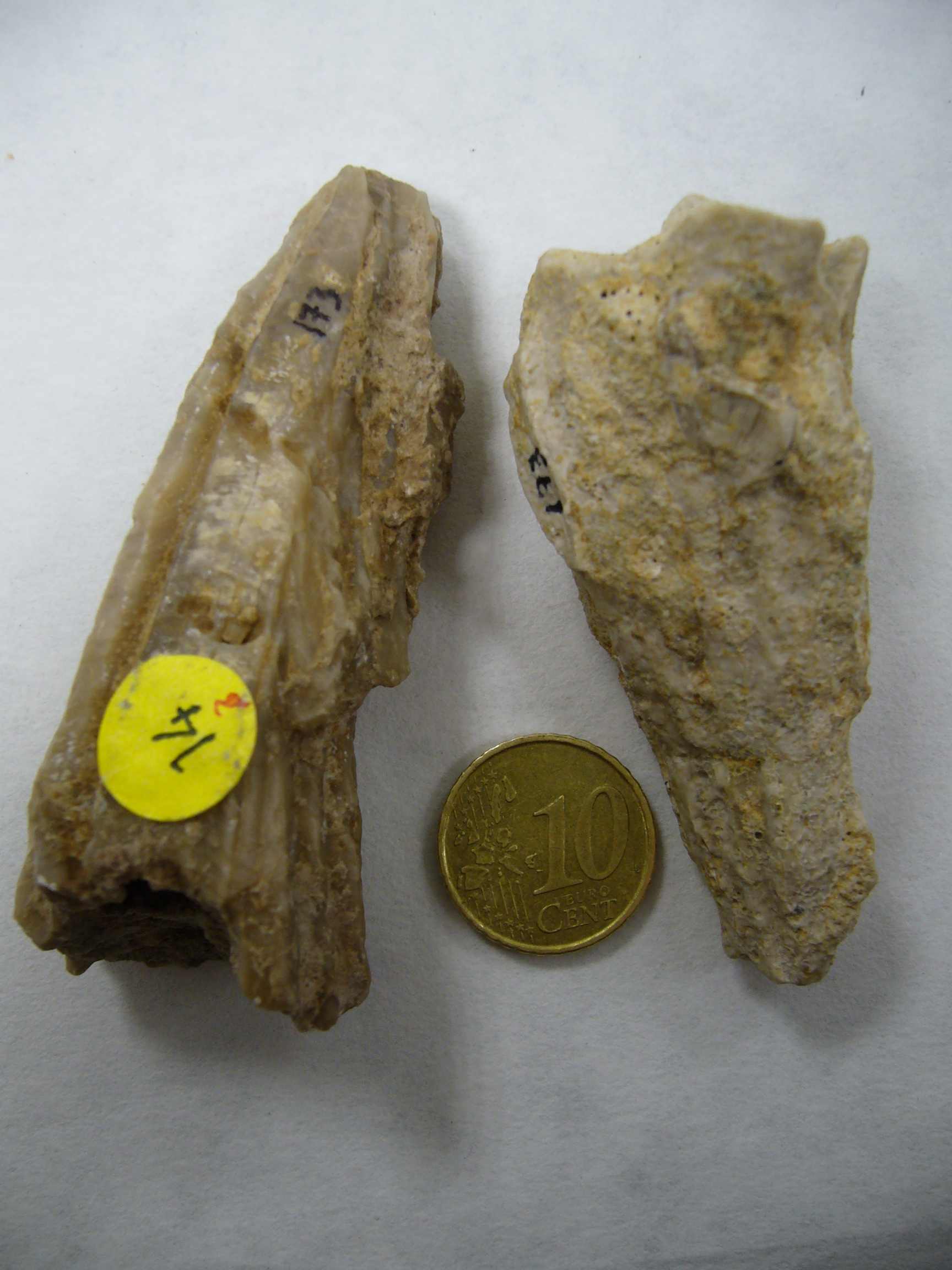
- Hippurites sp.

Scientific classification
- Kingdom: Animalia
- Phylum: Mollusca
- Class: Bivalvia
- Order: †Hippuritida
- Family: †Hippuritidae
- Genus: †Hippurites; Lamarck 1801

= Hippurites =

Hippurites Temporal range: Late Cretaceous

Extinct genus of bivalves

Hippurites is an extinct genus of rudist bivalve mollusc from the Late Cretaceous of Africa, Asia, Europe, North America, and South America.

== Species ==
- Hippurites atheniensis Ktenas 1907
- Hippurites colliciatus Woodward 1855
- Hippurites cornucopiae Defrance 1821
- Hippurites cornuvaccinum Brown
