= Spirocyclina =

Spirocyclina Temporal range: Late Cretaceous (Santonian)

Scientific classification
- Domain: Eukaryota
- Clade: Sar
- Clade: Rhizaria
- Phylum: Retaria
- Subphylum: Foraminifera
- Class: Globothalamea
- Order: Loftusiida
- Family: †Spirocyclinidae
- Genus: †Spirocyclina; Munier-Chalmas, 1887

Genus of single-celled organisms

Spirocyclina is a genus of large forams, with a flat test as much as 10mm in diameter. Coiling is planispiral to slightly asymmetric and mostly involute, some becoming uncoiled with a straight final stage. The final whorl, or stage, has about 25 strongly arcuate chambers. Composition is of agglutinated matter, the outer layer of the wall imperforate. Chambers are subdivided into secondary chamberlets by internal structures. The aperture consists of a double row of pores on the apertural face. Anchispirocyclina and Martiguesia are among related genera.
