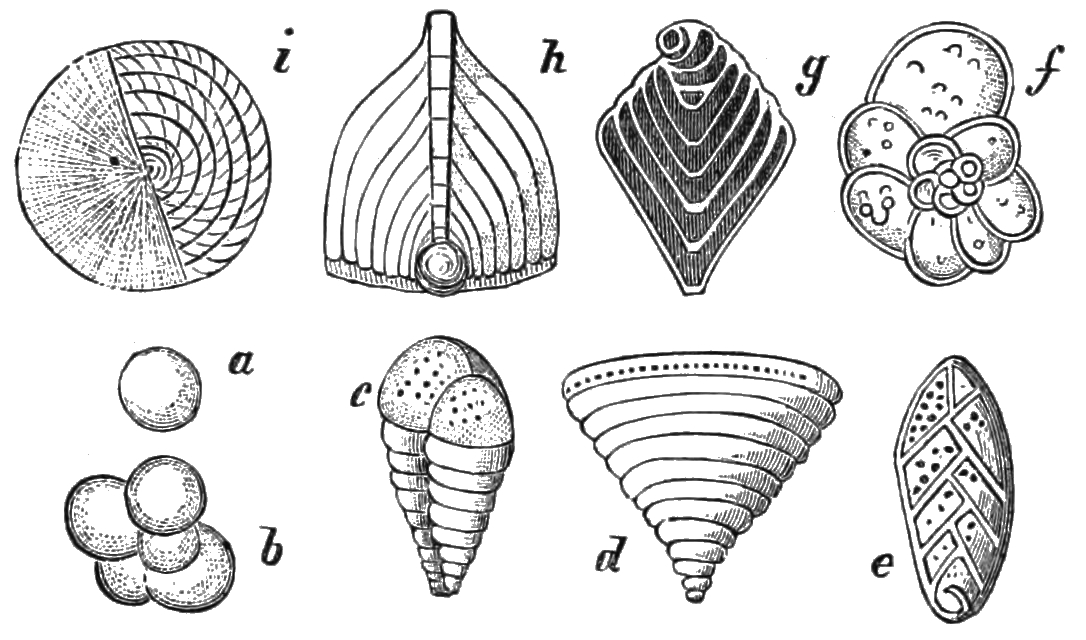
- Illustration of Popular Science Monthly, Volume 10, 1876 - Rhizopods, fig. d: Cuneolina pavonia

Scientific classification
- Domain: Eukaryota
- Clade: Sar
- Clade: Rhizaria
- Phylum: Retaria
- Subphylum: Foraminifera
- Class: Globothalamea
- Order: Loftusiida
- Family: †Cuneolinidae; Saidova, 1981

Subfamilies
- †Cuneolininae; †Sabaudiinae; †Scythiolininae

= Cuneolinidae =

Cuneolinidae Temporal range: 163.5–66.0 Ma

Family of single-celled organisms

Cuneolinidae is an extinct family of prehistoric foraminifera in the order Loftusiida, in the suborder Ataxophragmiina and superfamily Ataxophragmioidea.

== Overview of genera ==
- †Cuneolininae
  - †Cuneolina
  - †Palaeolituonella
  - †Pseudotextulariella
- Sabaudiinae
  - †Sabaudia
- Scythiolininae
  - †Vercorsella
  - †Histerolina
  - †Scythiolina
