= Sornayina =

Sornayina Temporal range: Coniacian

Scientific classification
- Domain: Eukaryota
- Clade: Sar
- Clade: Rhizaria
- Phylum: Retaria
- Subphylum: Foraminifera
- Class: Globothalamea
- Order: Loftusiida
- Family: †Spirocyclinidae
- Genus: †Sornayina; Marie, 1960

Genus of single-celled organisms

Sornayina is a genus of benthic forams from the Upper Cretaceous (Coniacian) of France included in the Spirocyclinidae. The test is planispirally to slightly asymmetrically coiled, rarely becoming straighter. Microspheric tests reach as much as 3mm in diameter, megalospheric ones are somewhat smaller. Chambers are numerous and are divided into chamberlets by secondary septa.
