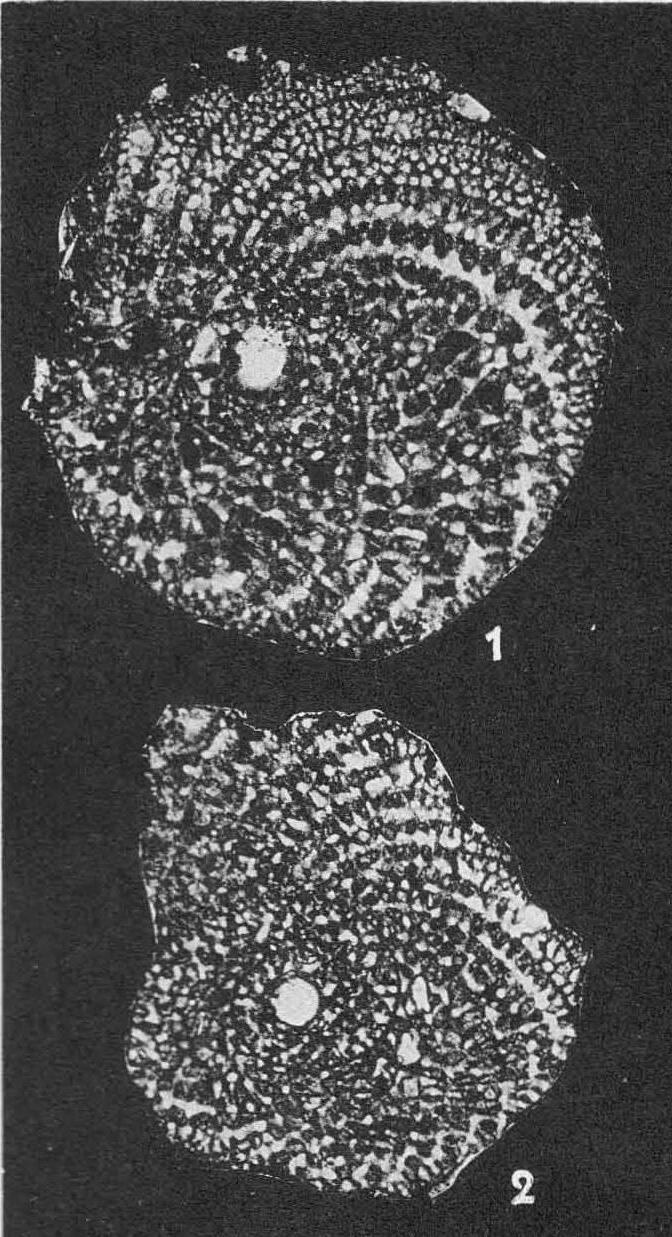
- Anchispirocyclina henbesti

Scientific classification
- Domain: Eukaryota
- Clade: Sar
- Clade: Rhizaria
- Phylum: Retaria
- Subphylum: Foraminifera
- Class: Globothalamea
- Order: Loftusiida
- Suborder: Loftusiina
- Superfamily: Loftusioidea
- Family: †Spirocyclinidae; Munier-Chalmas, 1887

Genera
- †Martiguesia Maync, 1959; †Persiella Schlagintweit & Rashidi, 2017; †Postbroeckinella Sirel, 2012; †Pseudospirocyclina Hottinger, 1967; †Qataria Henson, 1948; †Ramirezella Cherchi & Schroeder, 1999; †Reissella Hamaoui, 1963; †Saudia Henson, 1948; †Sornayina Marie, 1960; Spirocyclina Munier-Chalmas, 1887; †Streptocyclammina Hottinger, 1967; †Vania Sirel & Gündüz, 1985

= Spirocyclinidae =

Spirocyclinidae Temporal range: Early Jurassic–Eocene

Family of single-celled organisms

Spirocyclinidae is a family of foraminifera included in the order Loftusiida.

Tests are variably discoidal, aggulitinated with calcareous or microgranular cement. Interiors are complex with chambers partially subdivided. Walls and septa are pierced with ramifying and anastomosing channels. The family presently includes the following genera; Spirocyclina, Martiguesia, Pseudospirocyclina, Qataria, Reissella, Saudia, Sornayina, Streptocyclammina, and Vania.

Previous the subfamily Spyrocylininae according to Loeblich and Tappan, 1964 in the Treatise on Invertebrate Paleontology which then included Spriocyclina, Anchispirocyclina, Orbitammiina, and Sornayina. Orbitammina has been moved to the textulariid Orbitopsellidae where it rests along with Orbitopsella, Cyclorbitopsella, and Labyrinthina.

Foraminifera, to which the Spirocyclinidae belong are characterized by reticulate pseudopoda, and often produce intricate shells, or tests. They are referred to as Sarcodina in older texts, and more recently as Retaria.
