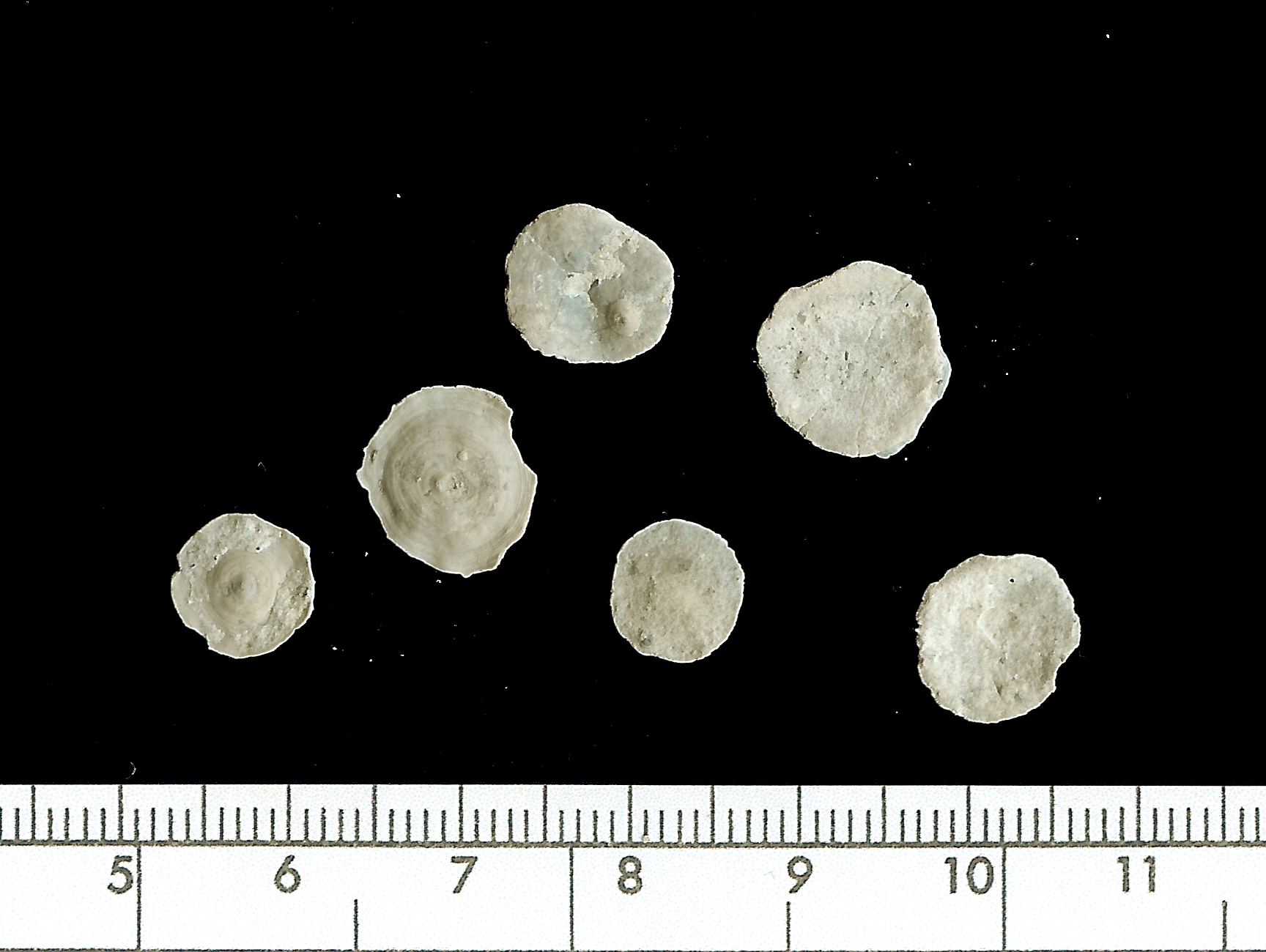
- Orbitolina texana (Roemer). Fossil shell of a foramanifera from the Glen Rose Formation (Lower Cretaceous) of Comal County, Texas.

Scientific classification
- Domain: Eukaryota
- Clade: Sar
- Clade: Rhizaria
- Phylum: Retaria
- Subphylum: Foraminifera
- Class: Globothalamea
- Subclass: Textulariia
- Order: Loftusiida; Kaminski & Mikhalevich, 2000

Suborders, superfamilies and families
- See text

= Loftusiida =

Order of single-celled organisms

Loftusiida is an order of foraminifers in the class Globothalamea.

== Subtaxa ==
Suborder Ataxophragmiina

- Superfamily Ataxophragmioidea
  - Family Ataxophragmiidae
  - Family †Cuneolinidae
  - Family Dictyopsellidae
  - Family Dicyclinidae
  - Family Globotextulariidae
  - Family Montsaleviidae
  - Family Textulariellidae

Suborder Biokovinina

- Superfamily Biokovinoidea (Biokovinacea)
  - Family Biokovinidae
  - Family Charentiidae
  - Family Lituoliporidae
- Superfamily Coscinophragmatoidea
  - Family Coscinophragmatidae
  - Family Haddoniidae

Suborder Cyclolinina

- Superfamily Cyclolinoidea
  - Family Cyclolinidae

Suborder Loftusiina

- Superfamily Haplophragmioidea
  - Family Cribratinidae
  - Family Haplophragmiidae
  - Family Labyrinthidomatidae
- Superfamily Loftusioidea (Loftusiacea)
  - Family Cyclamminidae
  - Family Ecougellidae
  - Family Everticyclamminidae
  - Family Hottingeritidae
  - Family Loftusiidae
  - Family Mesoendothyridae
  - Family Spirocyclinidae
  - Family Syrianidae

Suborder Orbitolinina

- Superfamily Coskinolinoidea
  - Family Coskinolinidae
- Superfamily Orbitolinoidea
  - Family Orbitolinidae
- Superfamily Pfenderinoidea
  - Family Hauraniidae
  - Family Parurgoninidae
  - Family Pfenderinidae
