= Foraminifera test =

Shell of a particular type of protist

External videos
- foraminiferans
- Foraminiferal networks and growth

Foraminiferal tests are the tests (or shells) of Foraminifera.

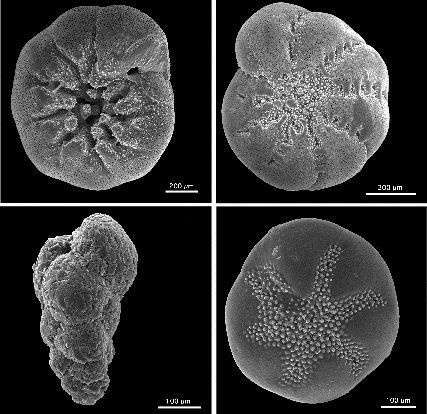
Foraminiferan tests (ventral view)

Foraminifera (forams for short) are single-celled predatory protists, mostly marine, and usually protected with shells. These shells, often called tests, can be single-chambered or have multiple interconnected chambers; the cellular machinery is contained within the shell. So important is the test to the biology of foraminifera that it provides the scientific name of the group—foraminifera, Latin for "hole bearers", referring to the pores connecting chambers of the shell in the multi-chambered species.

Foraminiferal tests are usually made of calcite, a form of calcium carbonate (CaCO_{3}), but are sometimes made of aragonite, agglutinated sediment particles, chitin, or (rarely) of silica. Other foraminifera lack tests altogether.

Over 50,000 species are recognized, both living (6,700 - 10,000) and fossil (40,000). They are usually less than 1 mm in size, but some are much larger, the largest species reaching up to 20 cm. Most forams are benthic, but about 40 extant species are planktonic. The hard nature of most foraminiferal tests leads to an excellent fossil record, and they are widely researched to infer information about past climate and environments.

== Background ==
Foraminiferal tests serve to protect the organism within. Owing to their generally hard and durable construction (compared to other protists), the tests of foraminifera are a major source of scientific knowledge about the group.

Openings in the test that allow the cytoplasm to extend outside are called apertures. The primary aperture, leading to the exterior, take many different shapes in different species, including but not limited to rounded, crescent-shaped, slit-shaped, hooded, radiate (star-shaped), dendritic (branching). Some foraminifera have "toothed", flanged, or lipped primary apertures. There may be only one primary aperture or multiple; when multiple are present, they may be clustered or equatorial. In addition to the primary aperture, many foraminifera have supplemental apertures. These may form as relict apertures (past primary apertures from an earlier growth stage) or as unique structures.

Test shape is highly variable among different foraminifera; they may be single-chambered (unilocular) or multi-chambered (multilocular). In multilocular forms, new chambers are added as the organism grows. A wide variety of test morphologies is found in both unilocular and multilocular forms, including spiraled, serial, and milioline, among others.

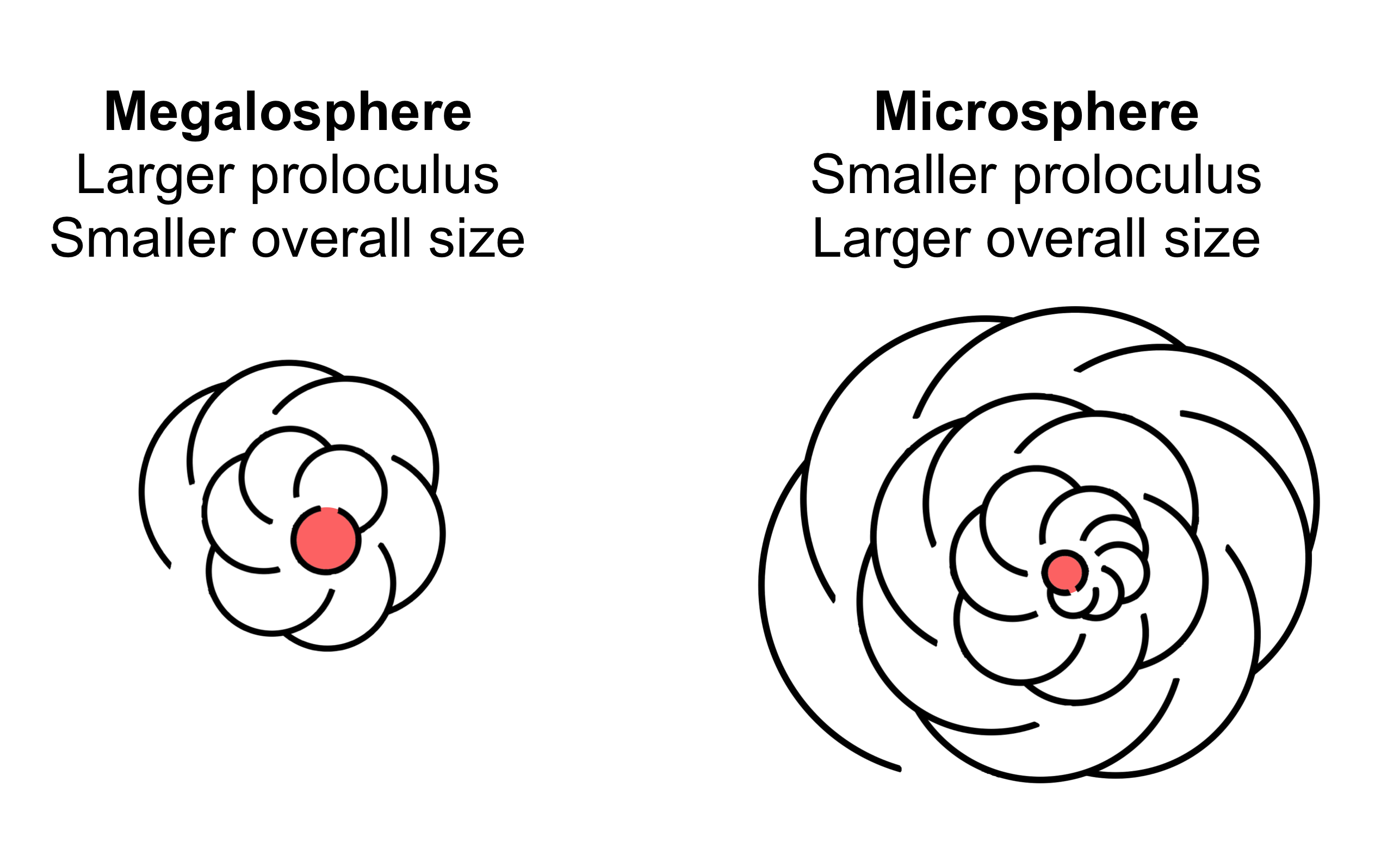
Many multi-chambered foraminifera follow a life cycle alternating between microspheric and megalospheric forms (see Foraminifera § Reproduction). The name of each morph refers to the size of the initial chamber, rather than to the size of the entire organism.

Many foraminifera exhibit dimorphism in their tests, with microspheric and megalospheric individuals. These names should not be taken as referring to the size of the full organism; rather, they refer to the size of the first chamber, or proloculus. Tests as fossils are known from as far back as the Ediacaran period, and many marine sediments are composed primarily of them. For instance, the limestone that makes up the pyramids of Egypt is composed almost entirely of nummulitic benthic foraminifera. It is estimated that reef foraminifera generate about 43 million tons of calcium carbonate per year.

Genetic studies have identified the naked amoeba Reticulomyxa and the peculiar xenophyophores as foraminiferans without tests. A few other amoeboids produce reticulose pseudopodia, and were formerly classified with the forams as the Granuloreticulosa, but this is no longer considered a natural group, and most are now placed among the Cercozoa.

== Composition ==
The form and composition of their tests are the primary means by which forams are identified and classified. Most secrete calcareous tests, composed of calcium carbonate. Calcareous tests may be composed of either aragonite or calcite depending on species; among those with calcite tests, the test may contain either a high or low fraction of magnesium substitution. The test contains an organic matrix, which can sometimes be recovered from fossil samples.

Some studies suggest a high amount of homoplasy in foraminifera, and that neither agglutinated nor calcareous foraminifera form monophyletic groupings.

=== Soft ===
In some forams, the tests may be composed of organic material, typically the protein tectin. Tectin walls may have sediment particles loosely adhered onto the surface. The foram Reticulomyxa entirely lacks a test, having only a membranous cell wall. Organic-walled forams have traditionally been grouped as the "allogromiids"; however, genetic studies have found that this does not make up a natural group.

=== Agglutinated ===
Other forams have tests made from small pieces of sediment cemented together (agglutinated) by either proteins (possibly collagen-related), calcium carbonate, or Iron (III) oxide. In the past these forms were grouped together as the single-chambered "astrorhizids" and the multi-chambered textulariids. However, recent genetic studies suggest that "astrorhizids" do not make up a natural grouping, instead forming a broad base of the foram tree.

Textulariid foraminifera, unlike other living members of the globothalamea, have agglutinated tests; however, grains in these tests are cemented with a calcite cement. This calcite cement is made up of small (<100 nm) globular nanograins, similar to in other globothalameans. These tests may also have many pores, another feature uniting them with the globothalamea.

Agglutinating foraminifera may be selective regarding what particles they incorporate into their shells. Some species prefer certain sizes and types of rock particles; other species are preferential towards certain biological materials. Certain species of foraminifera are known to have preferentially agglutinated coccoliths to form their tests; others preferentially utilise echinoderm plates, diatoms, or even other foraminiferans' tests.

The foraminifera Spiculosiphon preferentially agglutinates silica sponge spicules using an organic cement; it shows strong selectivity also towards shape, utilising elongated spicules on its "stalk" and shortened ones on its "bulb". It is thought to use the spicules as both a means of elevating itself off the seabed as well as to lengthen the reach of its pseudopodia to capture prey.

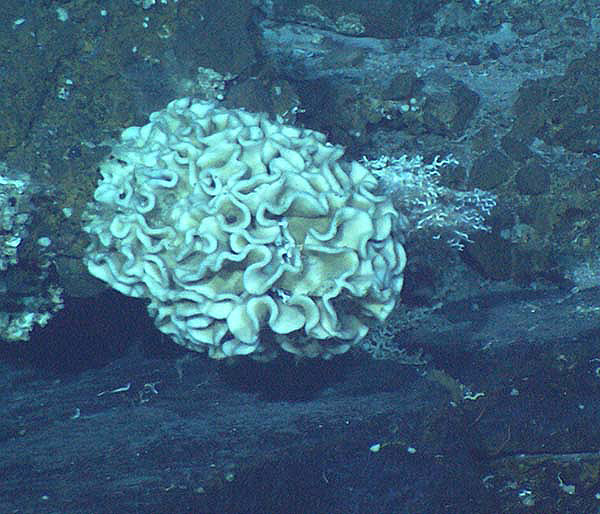
Xenophyophores create the largest agglutinated tests of any foraminifera

The agglutinated tests of xenophyophores are the largest of any foraminifera, reaching up to 20 cm in diameter. The name "xenophyophore", meaning "bearer of foreign bodies", refers to this agglutinating habit. Xenophyophores selectively uptake sediment grains between 63 and 500 μm, avoiding larger pebbles and finer silts; type of sediment seems to be a strong factor in which particles are agglutinated, as particle type preferentially includes sulfides, oxides, volcanic glass, and especially tests of smaller foraminifera. Xenophyophores 1.5 cm in diameter have been recorded completely naked, with no test whatsoever.

=== Calcareous ===
Of those foraminifera with calcareous tests, several different structures of calcite crystals are found.

==== Porcelaneous ====
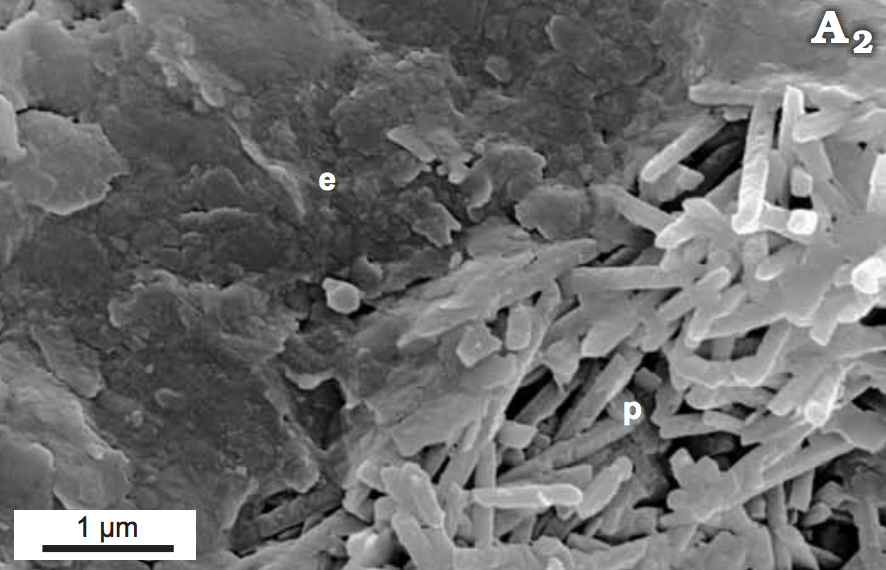
SEM photomicrograph of a miliolid test wall, showing the nanogranular extrados (e) and needlelike porcelain (p) layers.

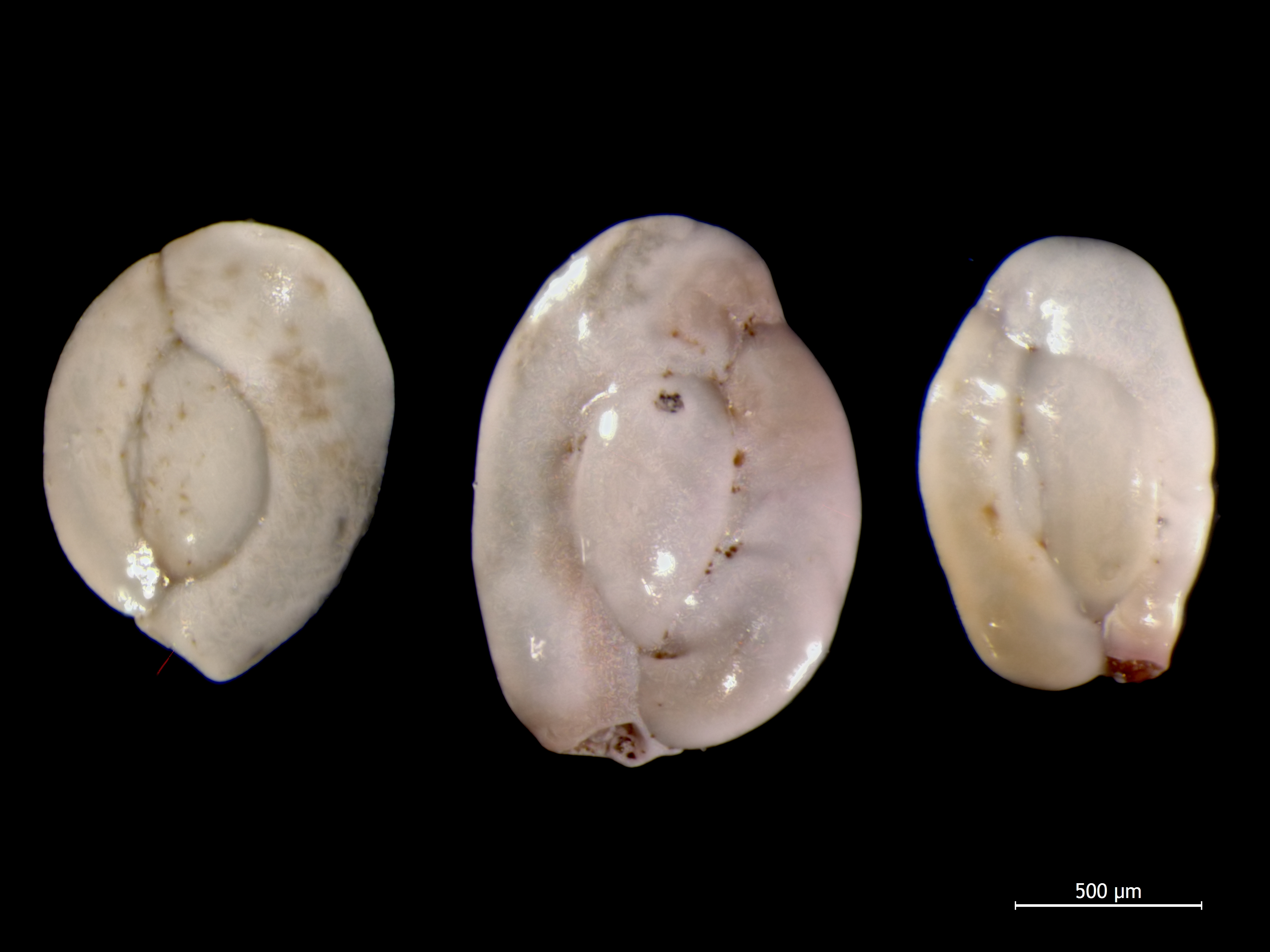
The porcelanous test of the miliolid foraminiferan Quinqueloculina from the North Sea

Porcelaneous walls are found in the Miliolida. These consist of high-magnesium calcite organized with an ordered outer and inner calcite lining (the "extrados" and "intrados", respectively) and randomly oriented needle-shaped calcite crystals forming a thick center layer (the "porcelain"). An organic inner lining is also present. The external surface may have a pitted structure, but it is not perforated by holes. "Cornuspirid" miliolids apparently lack any extrados.

==== Monocrystalline ====
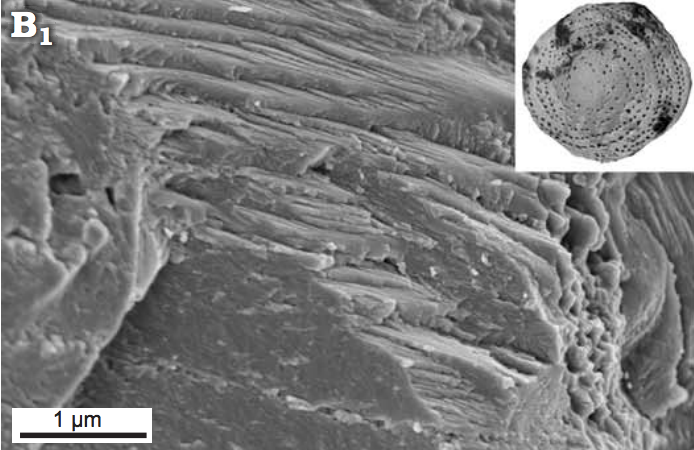
SEM photomicrograph of Patellina sp., showing cleavage of monocrystalline test

A "monocrystalline" test structure has traditionally been described for the Spirillinida. However, these tests remain poorly understood and poorly described. Some supposed "monocrystalline" spirillinids have been found to actually have tests consisting of a mosaic of very small crystals when observed with scanning electron microscope. SEM observation of Patellina sp. suggests that a truly monocrystalline test may indeed be present, with apparent cleavage faces.

==== Fibre bundles ====
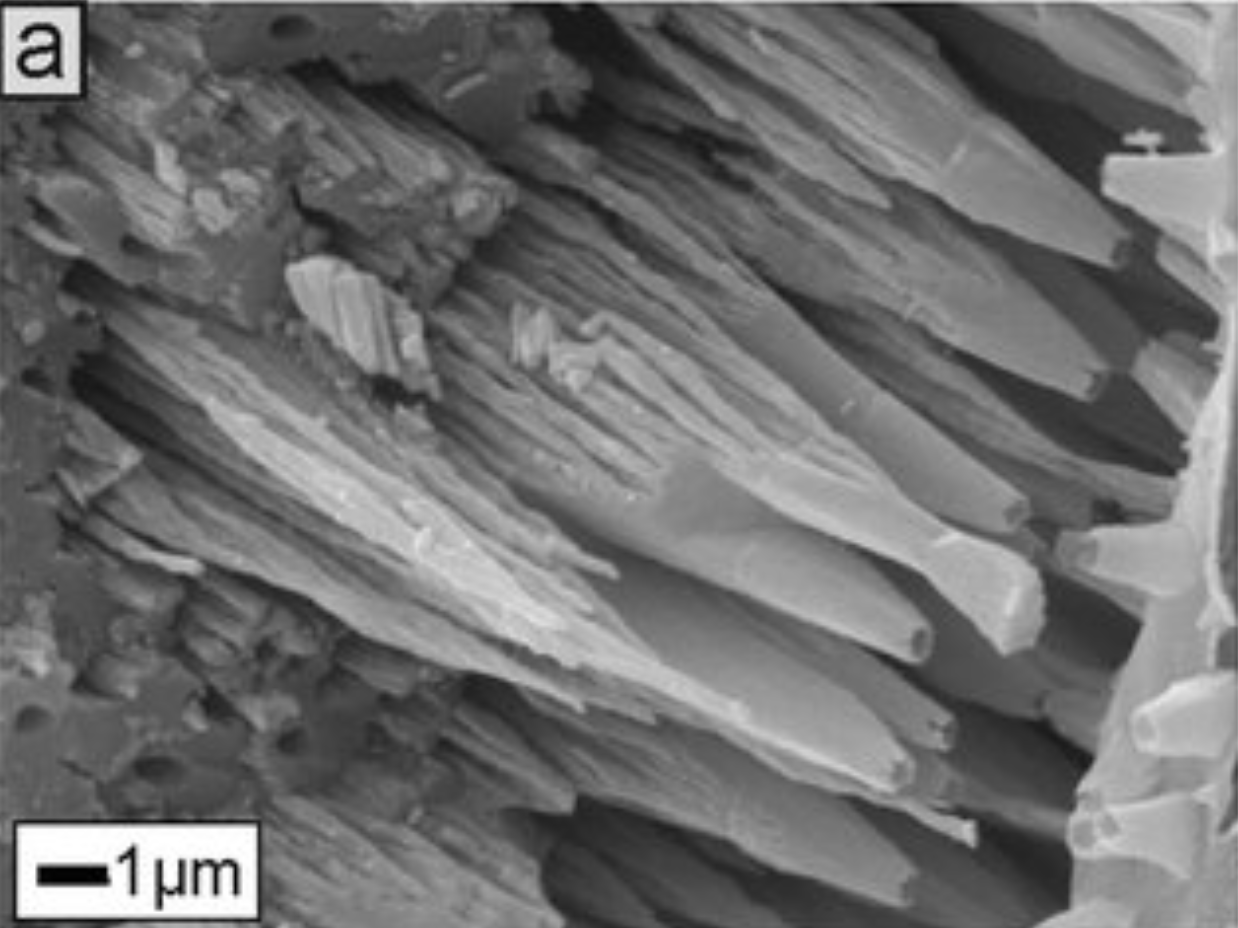
SEM photomicrograph of a lagenid test wall, showing fibre bundle structures. Internal organic layer can be seen to the far right of the image.

Lagenid tests consist of "fibre bundles" that can reach tens of micrometres long; each "bundle" is formed from a single calcite crystal, is triangular in cross-section, and has a pore in the centre (thought to be an artefact of test deposition). There is also an internal organic layer, attached to the "cone" structure of the fibre bundles. As the crystalline structure varies significantly from that of other calcareous foraminifera, it is thought to represent a separate evolution of the calcareous test. The exact mineralisation process of lagenids remains unclear.

==== Hyaline ====
Rotaliid tests are described as "hyaline". They are formed from low-to-high-magnesium calcite "nanograins" positioned with their C-axes perpendicular to the external surface of the test. Further, these nanograins can have higher-level structure, such as rows, columns, or bundles. The test wall is characteristically bilamellar (two-layered) and perforated throughout with small pores. The outer calcite layer of the test wall is referred to as the "outer lamina" while the inner calcite layer is referred to as the "inner lining"; this should not be confused with the organic inner lining beneath the test. Sandwiched between the outer lamina and the inner lining is the "median layer", a protein layer that separates the two. The median layer is quite variable; depending on the species it may be well-defined while in others it is not sharply delineated. Some genera may contain sediment particles within the median layer.

The now-extinct Fusulinids have traditionally been considered unique in having tests of homogenous microgranular crystals with no preferred orientation and almost no cement. However, a 2017 study found that the supposed microgranular structure was actually the result of diagenetic alteration of the fossils, and that unaltered fusulinid tests instead had a hyaline structure. This suggests that the group is affiliated with the Globothalamea.

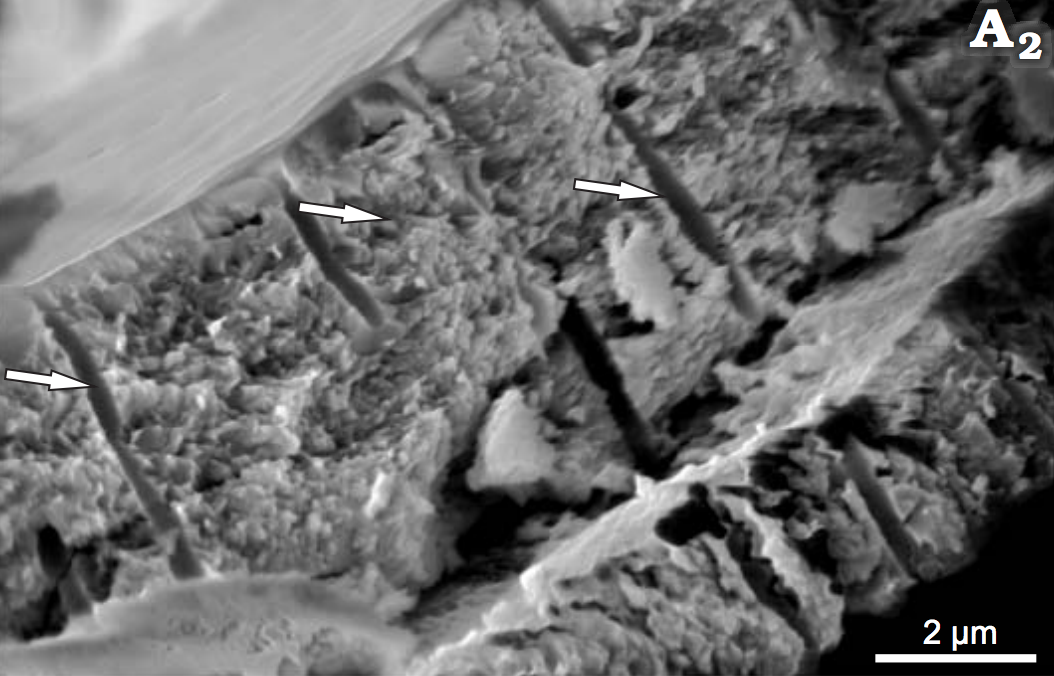
SEM photomicrograph showing cross section of a rotaliid wall. Note "globular nanograins" and two-layered test wall. Arrows point to pores.

Robertinids have aragonitic tests with perforations; these are similar to the tests of rotaliids in that they are formed from nanograins, however, they differ in composition and in having well-organised columnar domains. As the earliest planktonic forams had aragonitic tests, it has been suggested that this may represent a separate evolution of a planktonic lifestyle within the Robertinida, rather than being close relatives of Globigerinans.

Hyaline aragonitic tests are also present in the Involutinida.

==== Spicules ====
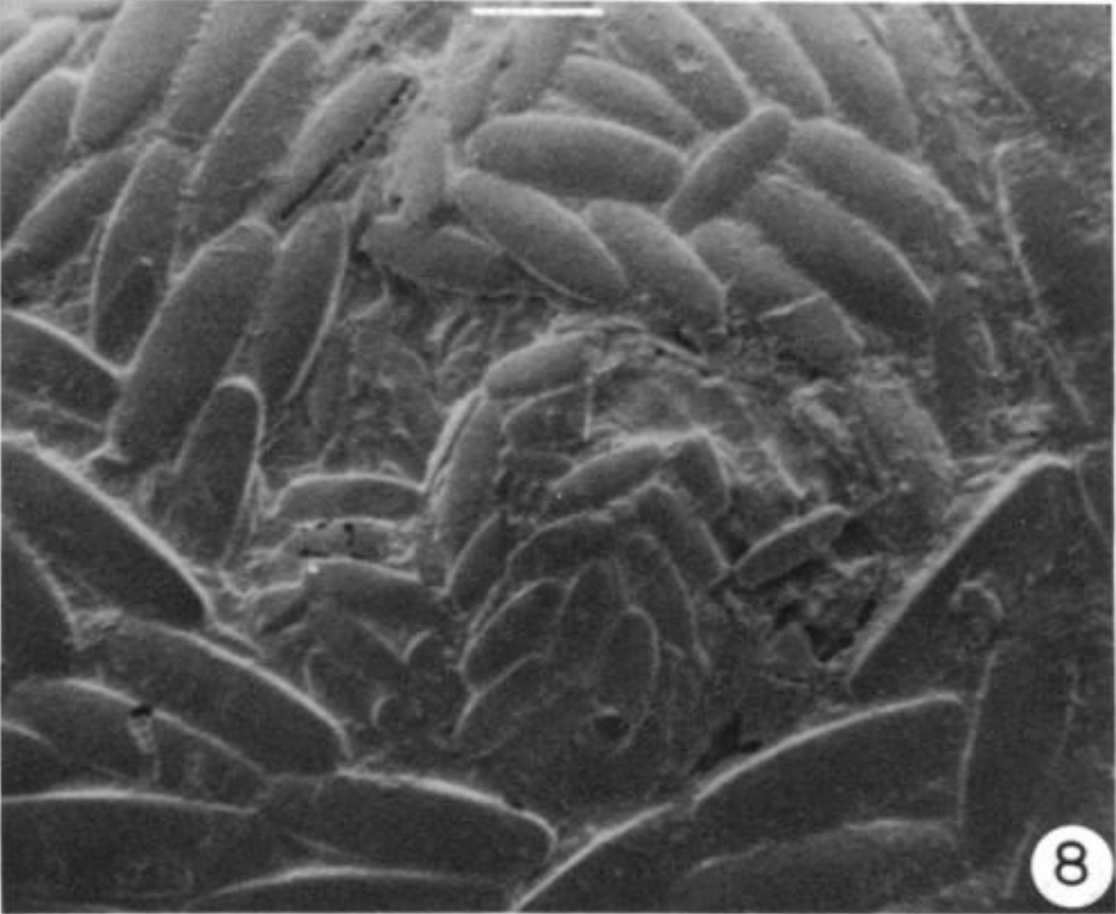
SEM photomicrograph of a carterinid test wall, showing secreted calcite spicules in organic matrix

The Carterinids, including the genera Carterina and Zaninettia, have a unique crystalline structure of the test which long complicated their classification. The test in this genus consists of spicules of low-magnesium calcite, bound together with an organic matrix and containing "blebs" of organic matter; this led some researchers to conclude that the test must be agglutinated. However, life studies have failed to find agglutination, and in fact the genus has been discovered on artificial substrate where sediment particles do not accumulate. A 2014 genetic study found carterinids to be an independent lineage within the Globothalamea, and supported the idea of the spicules being secreted as spicule shape differed consistently between specimens of Carterina and Zaninettia collected from the same locality (ovoid in Carterina, rounded-rectangular in Zaninettia).

=== Silicate ===
One genus, Miliammellus, has a non-perforated test made of opaline silica. It is similar in shape and structure to the porcelanous tests of typical miliolids; the test consists of an internal and external organic layer, as well as a middle silica layer made of elongate rods. This silica layer is further divided into outer, middle, and inner subunits; the outer and inner subunits each are approximately 0.2μm thick and consist of subparallel sheets of silica rods with their long axes parallel to the test surface. The middle subunit is approximately 18μm in thickness and consists of a three-dimensional lattice of silica rods with no organic component in the open space. The ultrastructure differs from that of miliolids in that the rods are over twice as long and twice as thick on average, in that the rods of Miliammellus are hollow rather than solid, and of course in having a silica test rather than calcite.

== Test wall construction ==
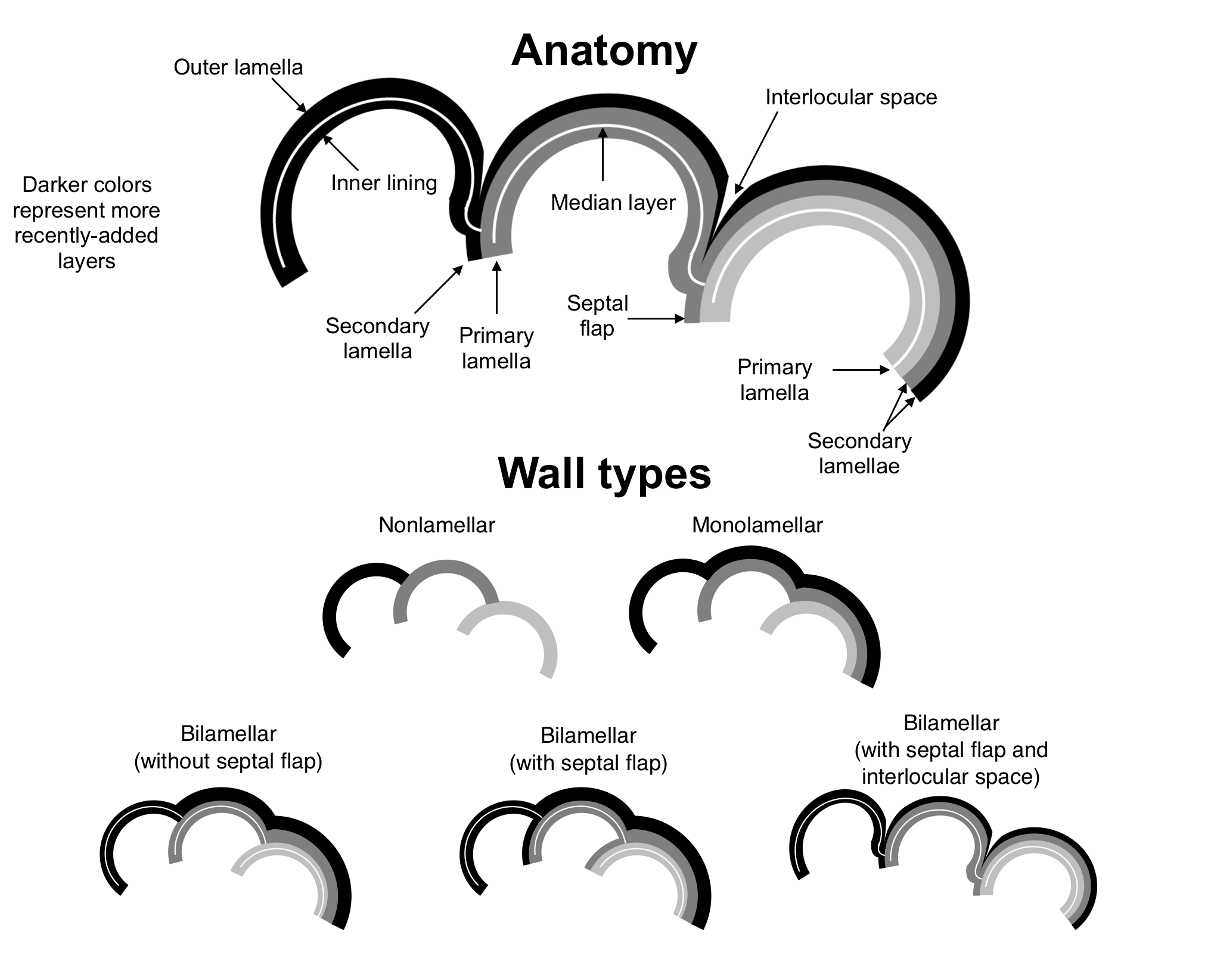
Anatomy and types of secreted foraminiferal walls

When a secreted test is present, walls of foraminiferal tests may be either nonlamellar or lamellar.

Nonlamellar walls are found in some foraminifera, such as Carterinida, Spirillinida, and Miliolida. In these forms, the secretion of a new chamber is not associated with any further deposition over previous chambers. As such there is no associated layering of calcite layers on the test.

In foraminifera with lamellar walls, the deposition of a new chamber is accompanied by the deposition of a layer over previously formed chambers. This layer may cover all previous chambers, or it may cover only some of them. These layers are known as secondary lamellae.

Foraminifera with lamellar walls can be further broken down into those with monolamellar walls and those with bilamellar walls. Monolamellar foraminifera secrete test walls which consist of a single layer, while those of bilamellar foraminifera are double-layered with an organic "median layer", sometimes containing sediment particles. In the case of bilamellar foraminifera, the outer layer is referred to as the "outer lamella" whilst the inner layer is referred to as the "inner lining". Monolamellar forams include the Lagenida, while bilamellar forms include the Rotaliida (including the major planktonic subgroup, the Globigerinina).

Bilamellar test walls can be further divided into those with septal flaps (a layer of test wall covering the previously secreted septum) and those lacking septal flaps. Septal flaps are not known to be present in any foraminifera other than those with bilamellar walls.

The presence of a septal flap is often, though not always, associated with the presence of an interlocular space. As the name suggests, this is a small space located between chambers; it may be open and form part of the outer surface of the test, or it may be enclosed to form a void. The layer enclosing the void is formed from different parts of the lamellae in different genera, suggesting an independent evolution of enclosed interlocular spaces in order to strengthen the test.

Foraminiferans

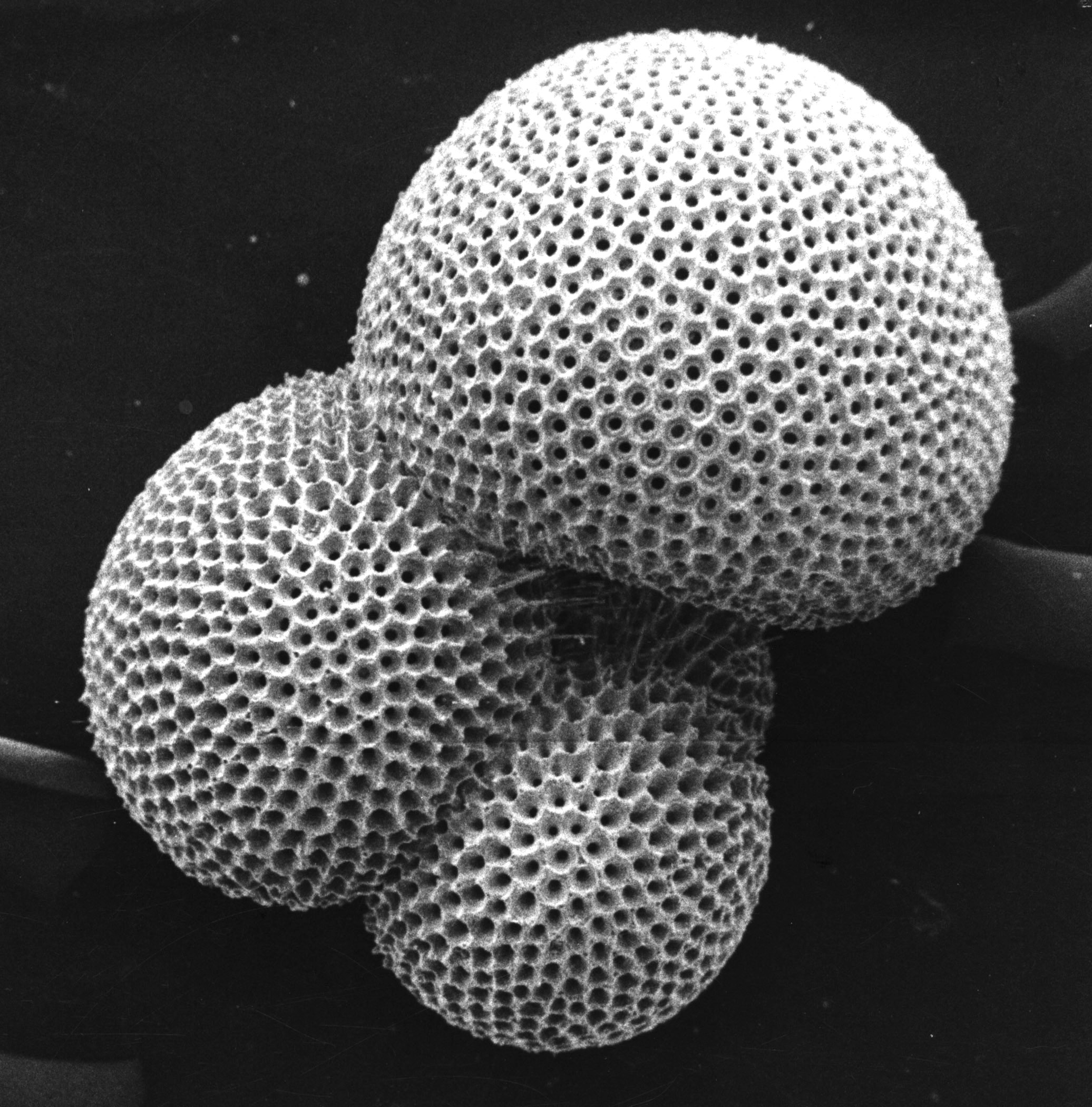
Empty globigerinid test, showing multiple test chambers with pores

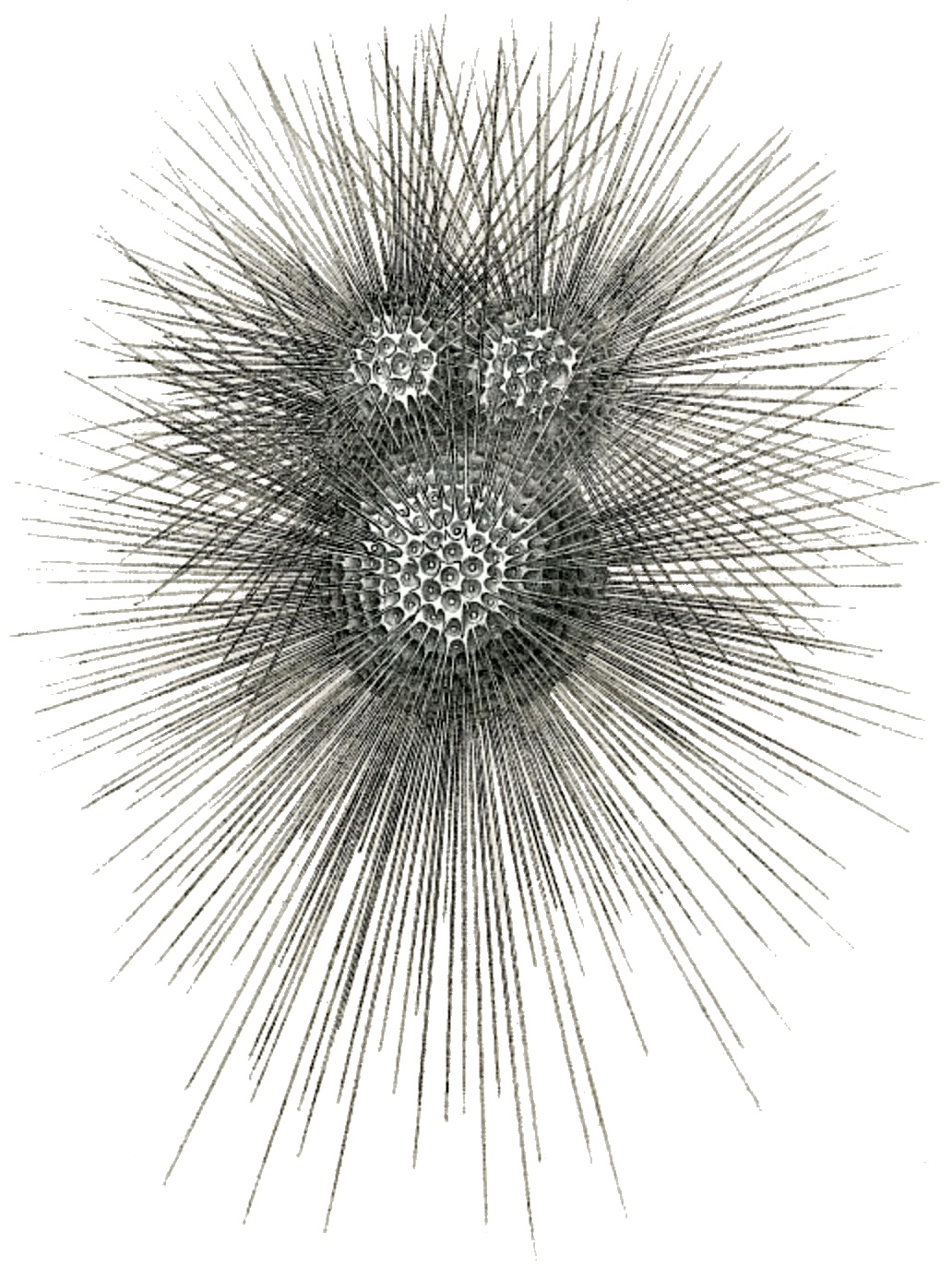
...and pseudopodia emanating from pores in life

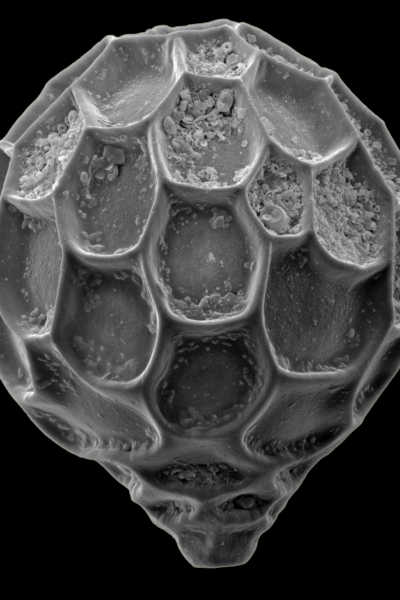
Benthic foraminifera Favulina hexagona, together with nanofossils enclosed inside the shell hexagons

Foraminiferan shapes
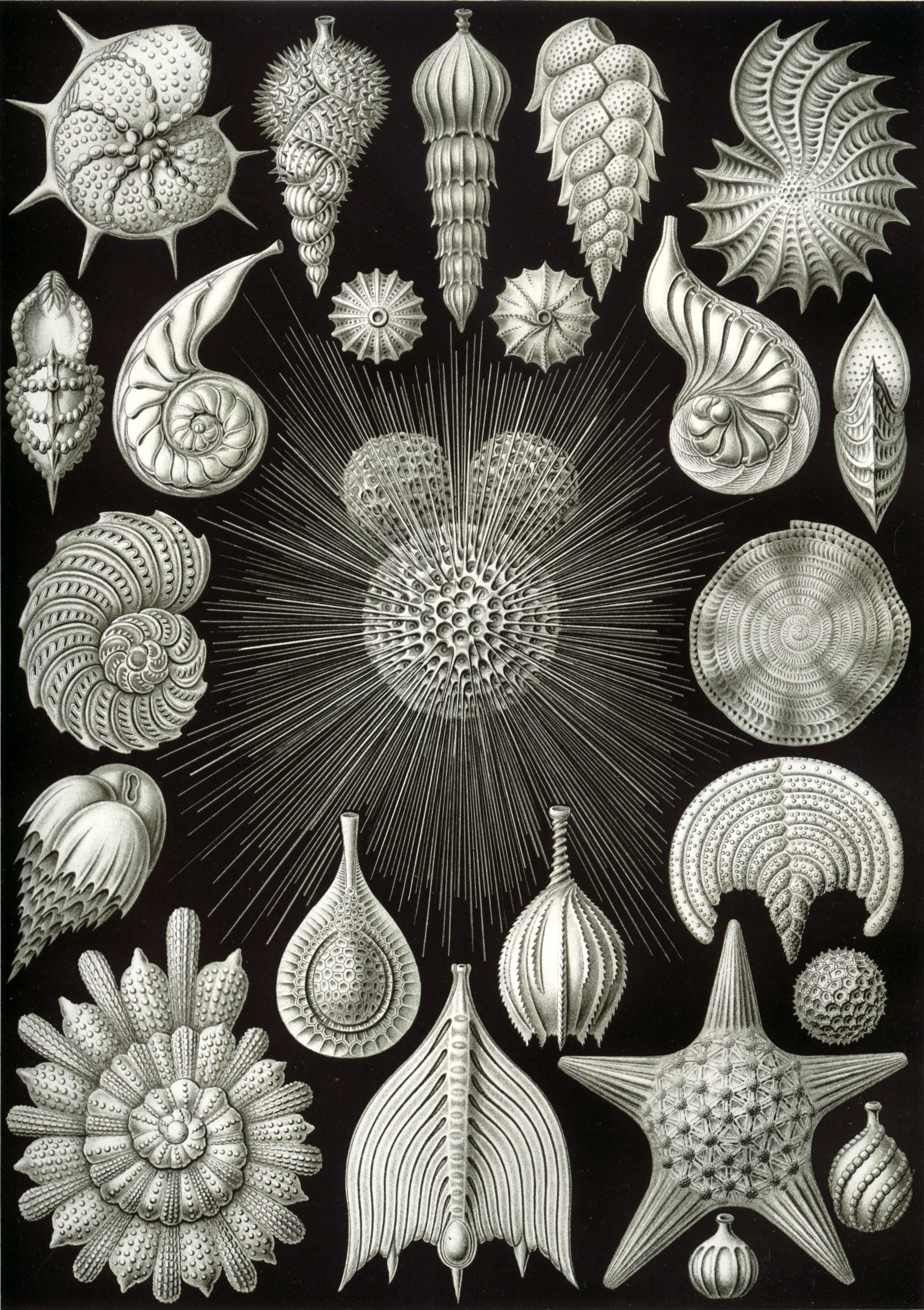
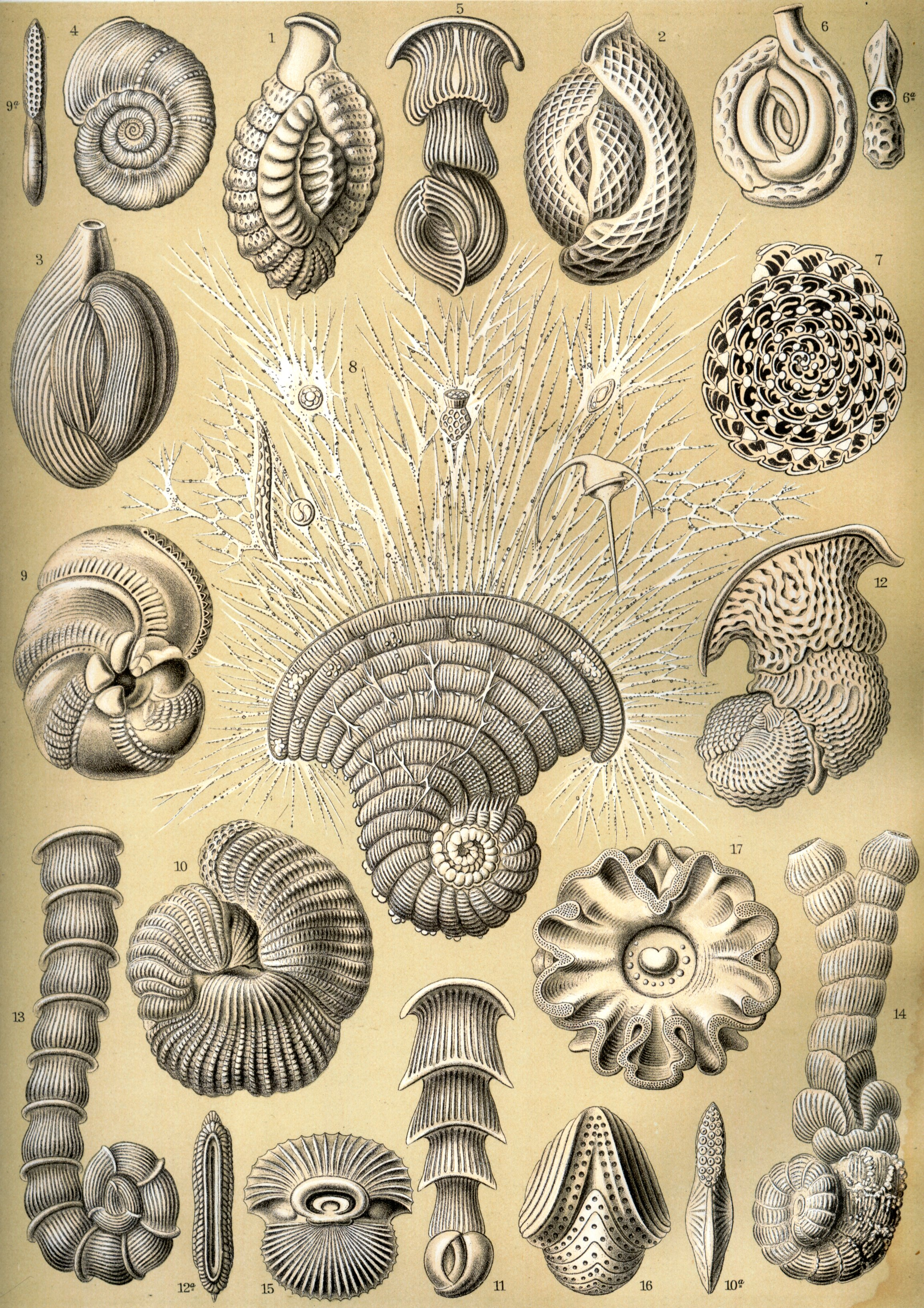
Drawings by Haeckel 1904 (click for details)
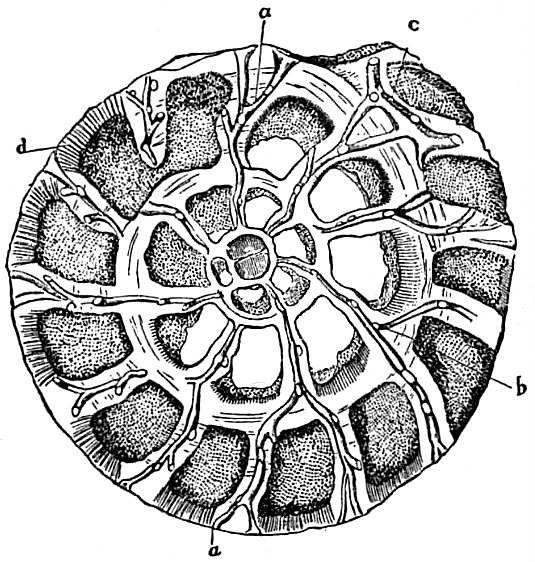
section showing chambers of a spiral foram

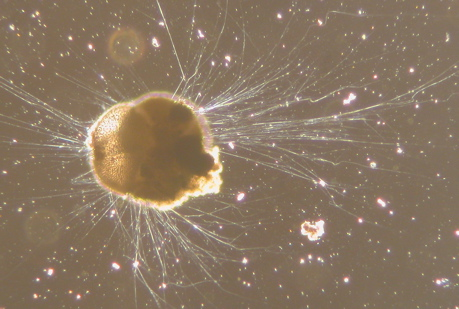
Live Ammonia tepida streaming granular ectoplasm for catching food

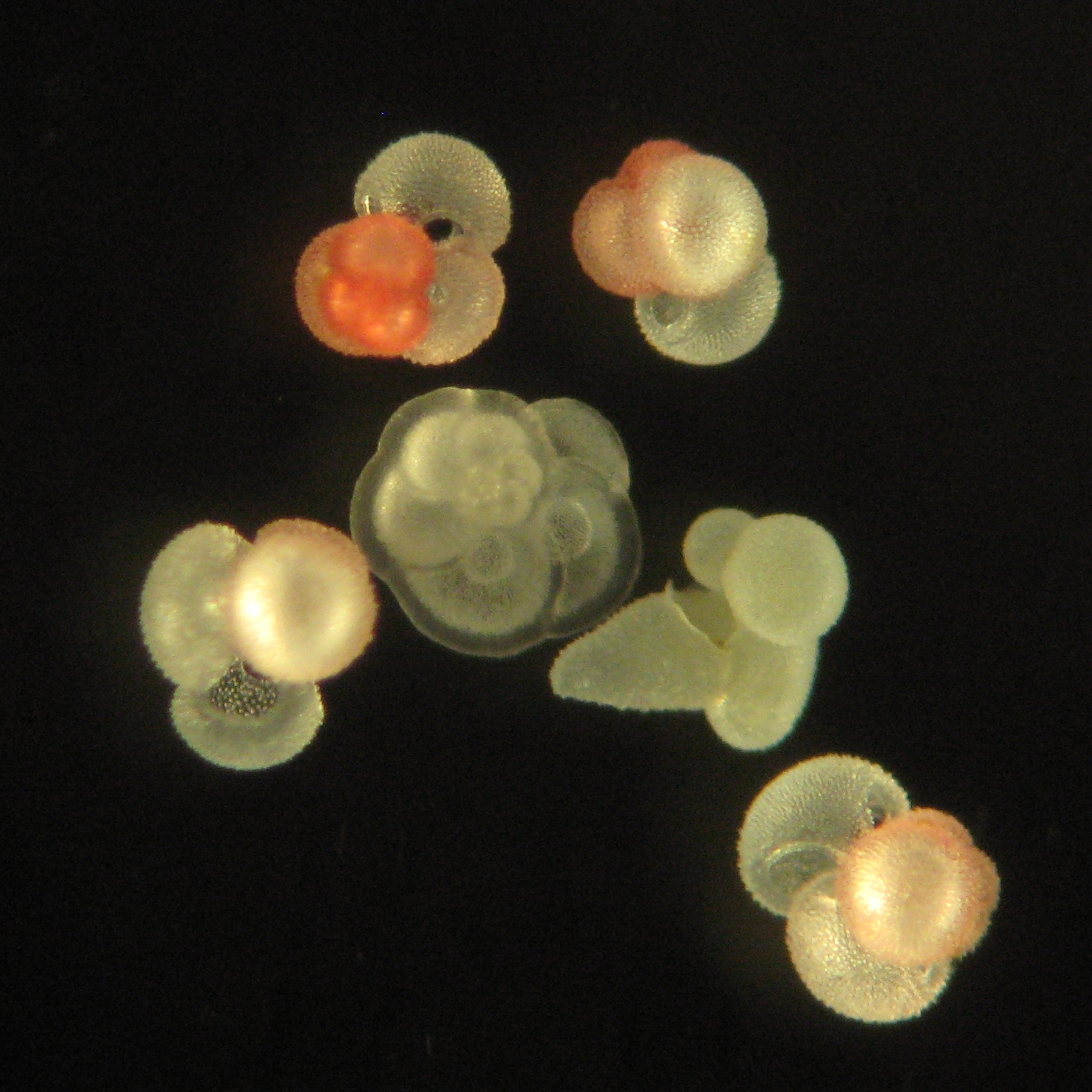
Group of planktonic forams

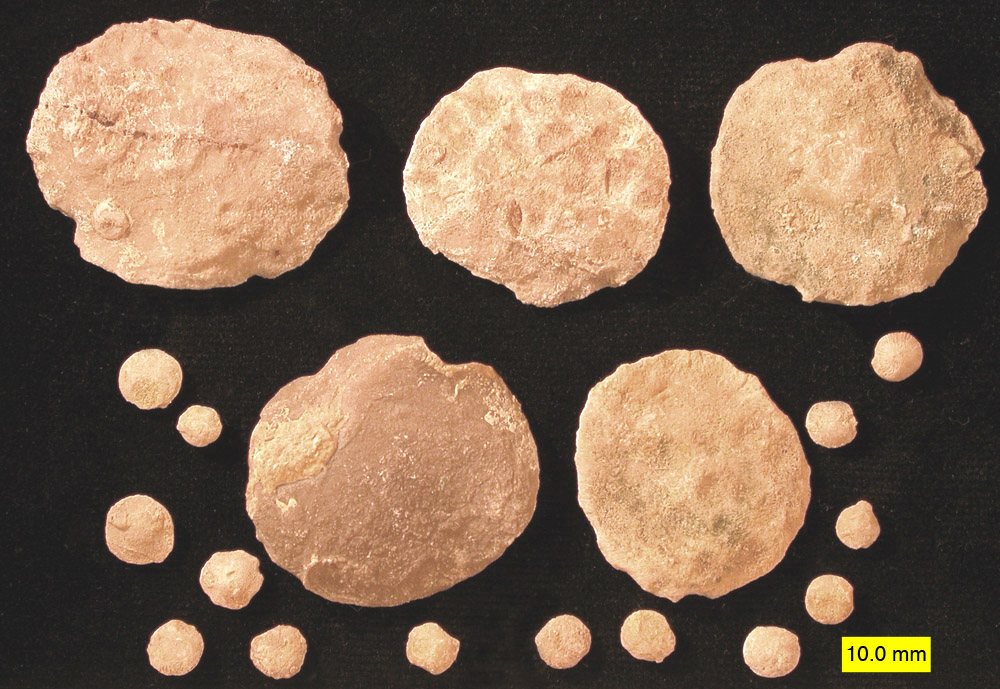
Fossil nummulitid forams of various sizes from the Eocene

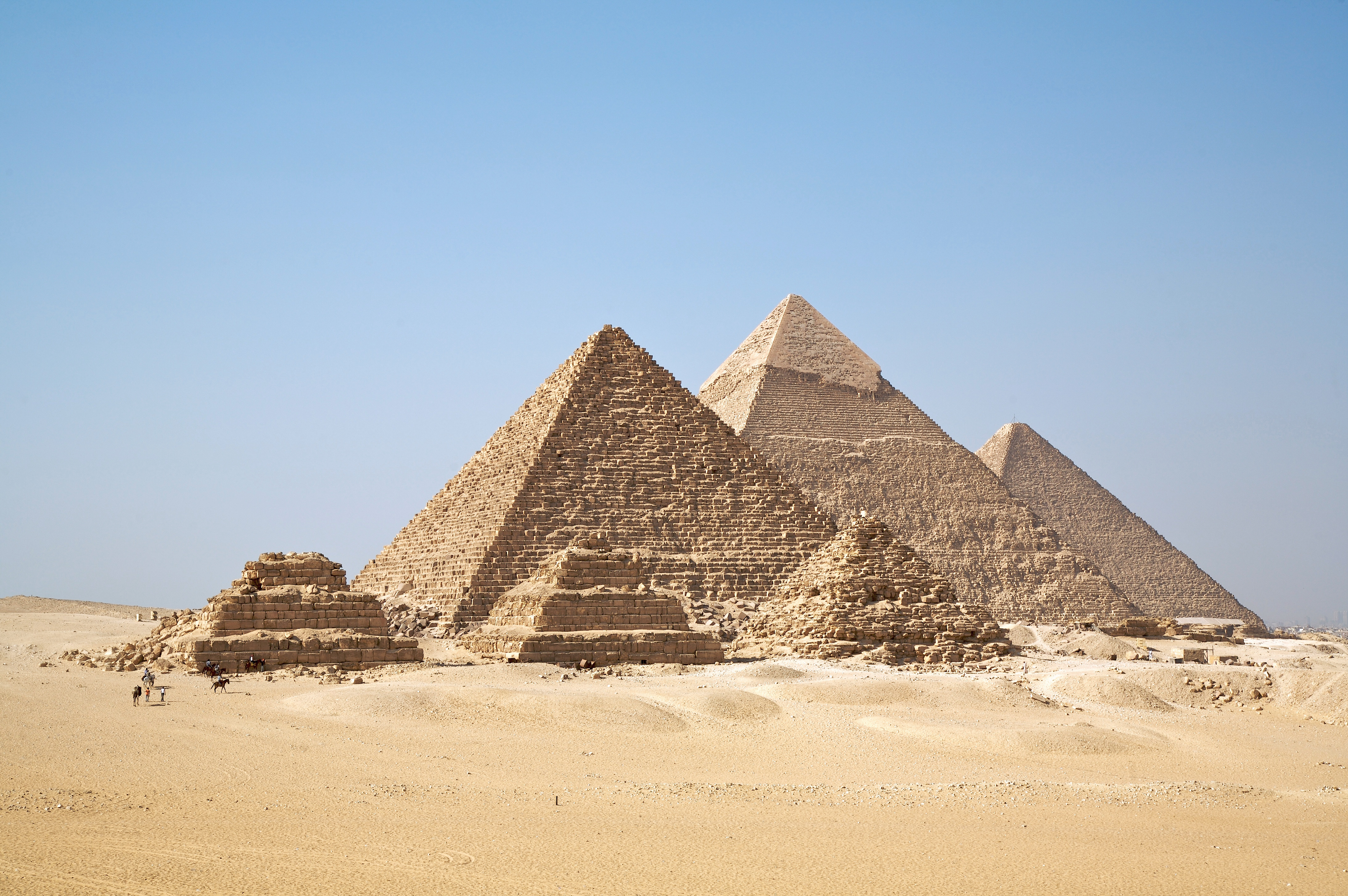
The Egyptian pyramids were constructed from limestone that contained nummulites.
