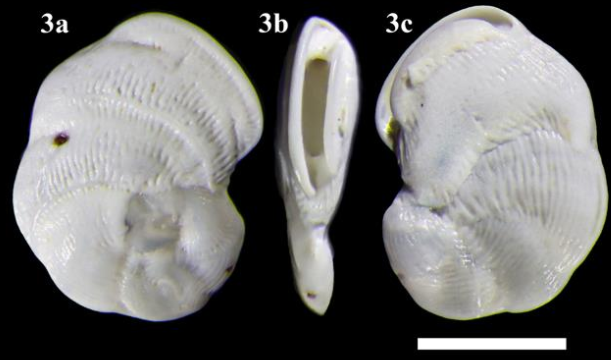
- Vertebralina striata

Scientific classification
- Domain: Eukaryota
- Clade: Diaphoretickes
- Clade: Sar
- Clade: Rhizaria
- Phylum: Retaria
- Subphylum: Foraminifera
- Class: Tubothalamea
- Order: Miliolida
- Suborder: Nubeculariina
- Superfamily: Nubecularioidea
- Family: Fischerinidae; Millett, 1898

= Fischerinidae =

Fischerinidae Temporal range: Carboniferous - Recent

Family of single-celled organisms

Fischerinidae is a foraminiferal family in the miliolid superfamily Nubecularioidea that comprises genera that can be free or attached, in which the proloculus is followed by an undivided tubular or spreading second chamber. Commonly, especially in free, i.e. unattached, forms the second chamber is looped around in coils. As diagnostic for the Miliolida the test wall is of imperphorate porcelaneous calcite. The aperture, which is the avenue of egress and ingress for the protoplasm, is terminal; can be rounded or slitlike.

The Fischerinidae was removed from the Milioloidea in which three subfamilies were included beginning with the Calcivertellinae and Cyclogyrinae in the Carboniferous, followed by the Fischerininae in the Jurassic. The Cyclogyrinae and Fischerininae persist in the present. The Calcivertellinae lasted only into the Jurassic.
