= Triloculina =

Triloculina Temporal range: Jurassic–Recent

Scientific classification
- Domain: Eukaryota
- Clade: Sar
- Clade: Rhizaria
- Phylum: Retaria
- Subphylum: Foraminifera
- Class: Tubothalamea
- Order: Miliolida
- Family: Miliolidae
- Subfamily: Quinqueloculininae
- Genus: Triloculina d'Orbigny, 1826

Genus of single-celled organisms

Triloculina is a genus of foraminifera in the order Miliolida, included in the Quinqueloculininae. The test has three chambers, each a half coil in length. Early chambers, at least in the microspheric generation, in quinqueloculinan arrangement, later becoming triloculine with successive chambers added in planes 120 degrees apart. Only the final three chambers are visible externally. The aperture is terminal, at the end of the final chamber, with a bifid tooth in adult forms. As with the entire order, the test is composed of imperforate, porcelaneous calcite.

The Pliocene to Recent Cruciloculina is very similar, except for having a different aperture, and is a likely derivative.
