= Sigmoilopsis =

Sigmoilopsis Temporal range: Miocene - Recent

Scientific classification
- Domain: Eukaryota
- Clade: Sar
- Clade: Rhizaria
- Phylum: Retaria
- Subphylum: Foraminifera
- Class: Tubothalamea
- Order: Miliolida
- Family: Miliolidae
- Subfamily: Quinqueloculininae
- Genus: Sigmoilopsis; Finlay, 1947

Genus of single-celled organisms

Sigmoilinopsis is a genus of miliolid Foraminifera, with an ovate test, chambers one-half coil in length, arranged in rapidly changing planes in the early stage resulting in two spiralling series that appear sigmoid in section, gradually becoming planispiral in the adult. Walls are thick, porcelaneous but enclosing a large quantity of agglutinated quartz particles, sponge spicules, and shell fragments; the aperture terminal, rounded, with a small tooth.

Sigmoilinopsis is grossly similar to Sigmoilina but with less enveloping chambers allowing earlier ones to be externally visible, and in incorporating agglutinated material.

Sigmoilinopsis is included in the Hauerinidae (Loeblich & Tappan 1988). Previously it was assigned to the Miliolidae (Loeblich & Tappan 1964) and included in the subfamily Quinqueloculininae.
