= Cruciloculina =

Cruciloculina Temporal range: Pliocene - Recent

Scientific classification
- Domain: Eukaryota
- Clade: Sar
- Clade: Rhizaria
- Phylum: Retaria
- Subphylum: Foraminifera
- Class: Tubothalamea
- Order: Miliolida
- Family: Miliolidae
- Subfamily: Quinqueloculininae
- Genus: Cruciloculina d'Orbigny in De La Sagra, 1839

Genus of single-celled organisms

Cruciloculina is a genus of foraminifers included in the Miliolidae from the Neogene, closely resembling Triloculina

The test is free, chambers one-half coil in length, added in planes 120 deg. apart, as in Triloculina. Tests are rounded to triangular in section; sutures depressed. As with other miliolid, the wall of the test is composed in imperforate, porcelaneous calcite. The aperture is terminal, at the end of the final chamber, but instead of having a distinct tooth, as in Triloculina, Cruciloculina develops as tri-radiate aperture in the young that becomes cruciform (X-shaped) to dendritic in the adult. Derivation from Triloculina is apparent.

Cruciloculina is known from the North Atlantic and South Atlantic Oceans and from Japan. Recent species have been found, for example, near the Falkland and South Georgia Islands.
