= Hemigordiopsidae =

Hemigordiopsidae Temporal range: Early Carboniferous - Holocene

Scientific classification
- Domain: Eukaryota
- Supergroup: Rhizaria
- Phylum: Foraminifera
- Class: Tubothalamea
- Order: Miliolida
- Suborder: Miliolina
- Superfamily: Cornuspiroidea
- Family: Hemigordiopsidae; A. Nikitina, 1969

Family of single-celled organisms

Hemigordiopsidae is a miliolid family included in the Cornuspiroidea that has a range extending from the Early Carboniferous (Visean) to the present.

Hemigordiopsids are characterized by tests in which the proloculus, or first chamber, is followed by an undivided tubular second chamber that is streptospirally coiled, (like a ball of string), at least in early stage, later may be planispiral, involute, or evolute.

Two subfamilies are included, the Hemigordiopsinae and Shanitinae. The Hemigrodiposinae, which as the same range as that of the family, includes some seven genera, five of which were removed from the Cyclogyrenae in the Treatise (Loeblich & Tappan 1964), and one from the Nubeculariinae, same. Diagnosis is essentially that from the Hemigordiopsidae. The Shanitinae, known from the Upper Permian, has a test like that of the Hemigordiosinae except that the chamber interior has vertical pillars.
