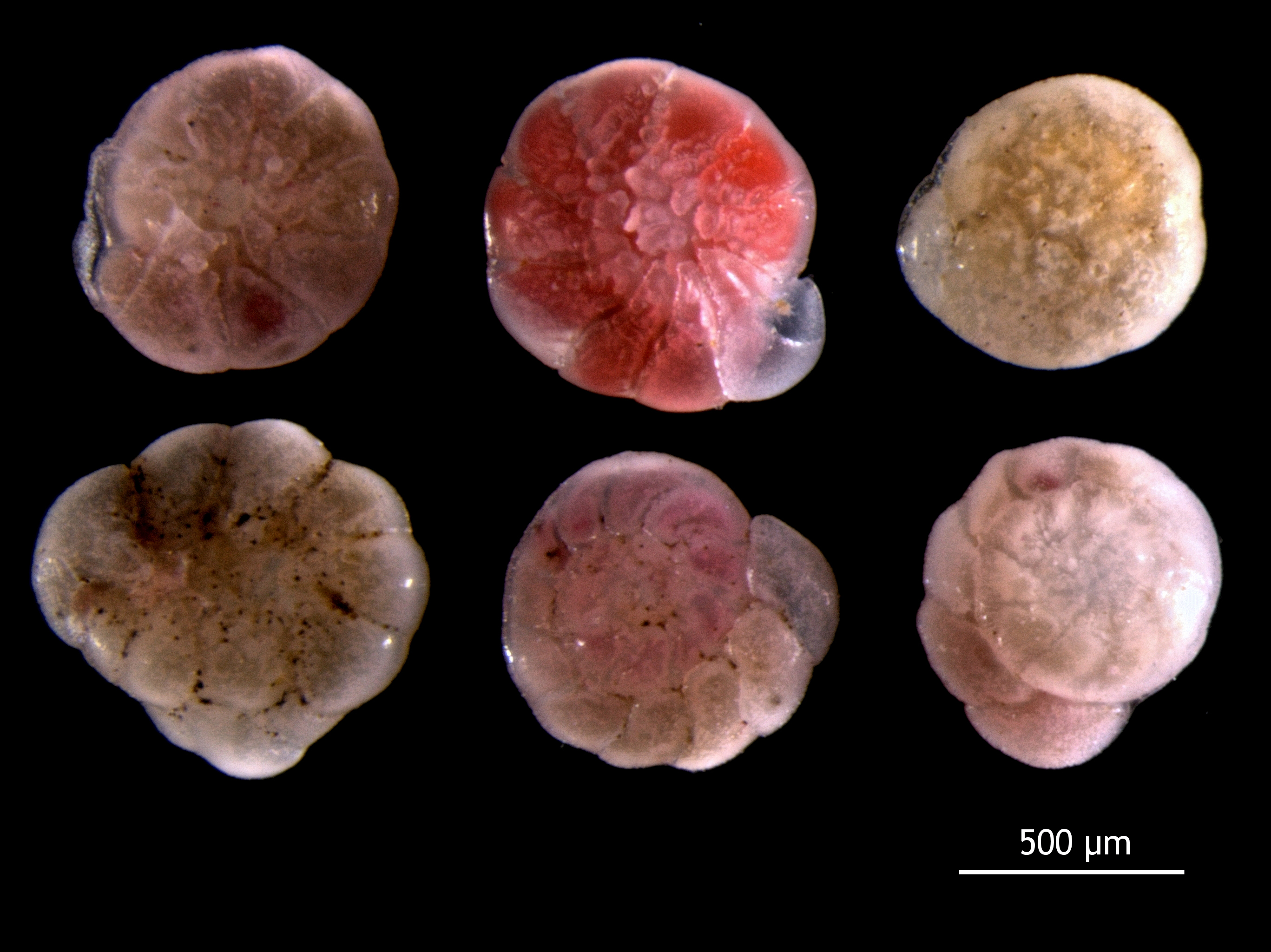
- Ammonia beccarii (Rotaliidae)

Scientific classification
- Domain: Eukaryota
- Clade: Sar
- Clade: Rhizaria
- Phylum: Retaria
- Subphylum: Foraminifera
- Class: Rotalidia

Orders
- see text

= Rotalidia =

Group of protists

Rotalidia comprises a class of Foraminifera where Foraminifera is regarded as a phylum, (Kingdom Protista or Rhizaria, not Chromista) that unites Foraminifera that have tests composed of secreted lamellar calcium carbonate, optically radial or granular calcite, or aragonite; separating them from those with porcelaneous, agglutinated, or microgranular, tests, or tests composed of organic compounds. Seven orders are included, the:

Rotaliida Delage & Hérouard, 1896
Carterinida Loeblich & Tappan, 1981
Globigerinida Delage & Hérouard, 1896
Involutinida Hohenegger & Piller, 1977
Lagenida Delage & Hérouard, 1896
Silicoloculinida Resig et al. 1980
Spirillinida Hohenegger & Piller, 1975.
