= Tritaxis =

Tritaxis may refer to:

- Tritaxis (foraminifera), a foraminiferan genus in the family Trochamminidae
- Tritaxis (plant), a plant genus in the family Euphorbiaceae

== See also ==
- Tritaxys, a genus of insect in the family Tachinidae
