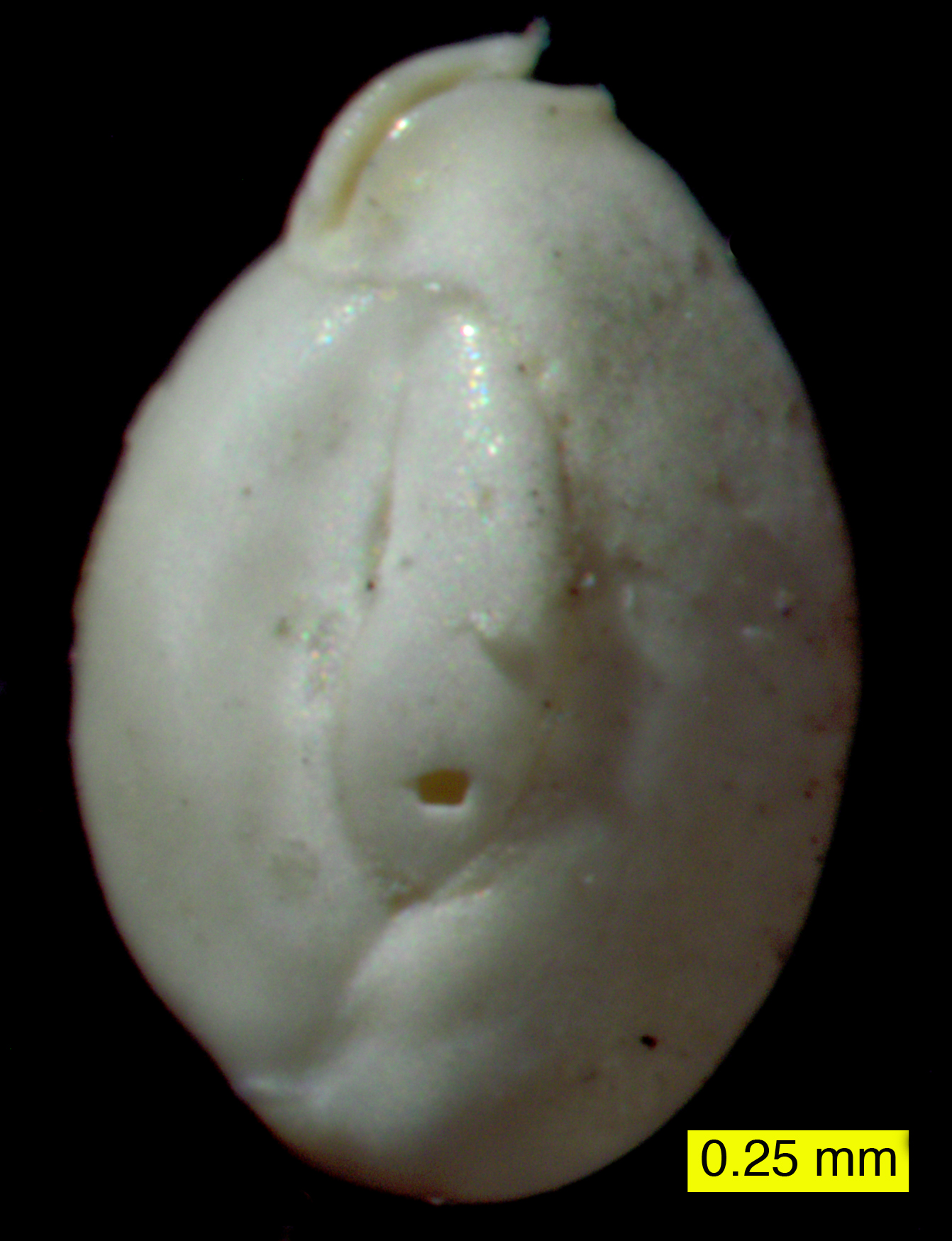
- Quinqueloculina sp. from Donegal Bay, Ireland.

Scientific classification
- Domain: Eukaryota
- Clade: Sar
- Clade: Rhizaria
- Phylum: Retaria
- Subphylum: Foraminifera
- Class: Tubothalamea
- Order: Miliolida
- Family: Miliolidae
- Subfamily: Quinqueloculininae

Genera
- Cruciloculina; Dentostomina; Flintina; Pateoris; Pyrgo; Pyrgoella; Quinqueloculina; Sigmoilina; Sigmoilopsis; Siphonaperta; Siphonaptera; Spirosigmoilina; Triloculina

= Quinqueloculininae =

Subfamily of single-celled organisms

Quinqueloculininae is a subfamily in the family Miliolidae of miliolid foraminifera.
