= Sigmoilina =

Sigmoilina Temporal range: Early Miocene - Recent.

Scientific classification
- Domain: Eukaryota
- Clade: Sar
- Clade: Rhizaria
- Phylum: Foraminifera
- Class: Tubothalamea
- Order: Miliolida
- Family: Miliolidae
- Subfamily: Quinqueloculininae
- Genus: Sigmoilina; Schlumberger 1887

Genus of single-celled organisms

Sigmoilina is a miliolid genus, referring to the foraminiferal order Miliolida, characterized by an asymmetrical biconvex test formed by strongly overlapping chambers, one-half coil in length, that form a sigmoid (S-shaped) curve in cross section. The strongly overlapping chambers obliterate earlier ones from view resulting in the compressed biloculine appearance, differing from the squat, depressed biloculine form of Pyrgo and Biloculina. The test, as for all Miliolida, is porcelaneous and imperforate, the terminal aperture, with tooth, the only point of egress and ingress for the animal.

Sigmoilina is a protist, or proctoctist according to B.K. Sen Gupta, 1999, included in the miliolid family Hauerinidae (Loeblich & Tappan, 1988). It was previously assigned to the Miliolidae (Loeblich & Tappan, 1964) when foraminifera were regarded as comprising a suborder (Foraminiferida).
