= Cornuspiroidea =

Scientific classification
- Domain: Eukaryota
- Clade: Sar
- Clade: Rhizaria
- Phylum: Retaria
- Subphylum: Foraminifera
- Class: Tubothalamea
- Order: Miliolida
- Suborder: Miliolina
- Superfamily: Cornuspiroidea; Schultze, 1854 nom. transl. Bogdanovich in Subbotina et al., 1981

Families
- Cornuspiridae; Hemigordiopsidae †Neodiscidae

Cornuspiroidea are globular, marine invertebrates belonging to the superfamily foraminiferan. The shell may be free or attached, planispiral or trochospiral, evolute or involute, spreading or discoidal. The proloculus, or initial chamber, is followed by undivided spiral passage or enrolled tubular chamber, later may be irregularly coiled, unicoiled, or show zigzag growth pattern and may be distinctly chambered. The shell wall is composed of imperforate porcelaneous calcite, a character of the Miliolida

Families and genera in the Cornuspiroidea were removed from the Milioloidea where they appear in the Treatise Part C (Loeblich & Tappan 1964).
