= Calcivertellidae =

Scientific classification
- Domain: Eukaryota
- Clade: Sar
- Clade: Rhizaria
- Phylum: Retaria
- Subphylum: Foraminifera
- Class: Tubothalamea
- Order: Miliolida
- Superfamily: †Calcivertelloidea
- Family: †Calcivertellidae; Loeblich & Tappan, 1964 nom. transl. Reitlinger in Vdovenko

Genera
- Apterrinella; Carixia; Plummerinella; Ramovsia

Subfamily of protists

Calcivertellidae is a family of foraminifera belonging to the order Miliolida. Calcivertellids have been found in Pennsylvanian to Triassic beds and had a cosmopolitan distribution.

The calcivertellids are characterized by a porcelain-like test consisting of a single tube, initially forming a spiral but opening out into a zigzag shape. They live attached to a surface or to other organisms.
