= Miliammellus =

Miliammellus Temporal range: Late Miocene - Recent

Scientific classification
- Domain: Eukaryota
- Clade: Sar
- Clade: Rhizaria
- Phylum: Foraminifera
- Class: Tubothalamea
- Order: Miliolida
- Suborder: Silicoloculinina; Resig, et al., 1980
- Family: Silicoloculinidae; Resig et al., 1980
- Genus: Miliammellus; Saidova & Burmistrova, 1978
- Species: M. legis

Binomial name
- Miliammellus legis Saidova & Burmistrova, 1978

Synonyms
- Silicoloculina profunda (Resig, et al, 1980)

Genus of single-celled organisms

Miliammellus is a genus of Cenozoic benthic foraminifera with tests made of imperforate opaline silica. It is the only genus in the suborder Silicoloculinina and the family Silicoloculinidae. It is sometimes referred to by the junior synonym Silicoloculina.

The family Silicoloculinidae, named by Resig, et al., 1980, is characterized by tests that resemble those of the imperforate calcareous Miliolidae, or the finely agglutinated Rzehakinidae in which chambers are about half a coil in length and arranged in various planes. Resig et al. named the genus Silicoloculina for specimens recovered from below the carbonate compensation depth in the Scotia Sea and the Peru-Chile Trench. Loeblich and Tappan synonymised this genus with Miliammellus in 1987.

Miliammellus, named by Saidova and Burmistrova, 1978, has a small ovoid test, up to 0.5 mm long with chambers arranged as in the miliolid Quinqueloculina. Chambers are slightly more than half a coil in length, resulting in successive whorls being offset, and are widest at their base, narrowing toward the aperture, a low arch at the end of the final chamber. Miliammellus has a range from the Upper Miocene to recent and has been found in the Bering Sea, Antarctic, north and central Pacific, and Indian Oceans at abyssal depths below 4,000 m. The type species is Miliammellus legis Saidova and Burmistrova, 1978.

Its test ultrastructure consists of small (5μm by 0.3μm), hollow rods of silica arranged in subparallel sheets, with an outer and inner organic membrane. The outer and inner organic layers are each approximately 0.1μm in thickness. The middle silica layer is about 19μm thick in total; it is further broken down into an outer, inner, and middle silica subunit. The outer and inner silica subunits are each approximately 0.2μm thick and consist of hollow silica rods arranged in subparallel sheets, with the elongation parallel to the surface. The middle silica subunit is approximately 18μm thick and consists of a randomly oriented lattice of hollow silica rods. No organic material is found within the open spaces between rods.

In overall shape as well as in ultrastructure, Miliammellus resembles miliolilid foraminifera. However, the ultrastructure differs in that the rods of miliolid test walls are solid rather than hollow, smaller, and of course are made of calcite.
