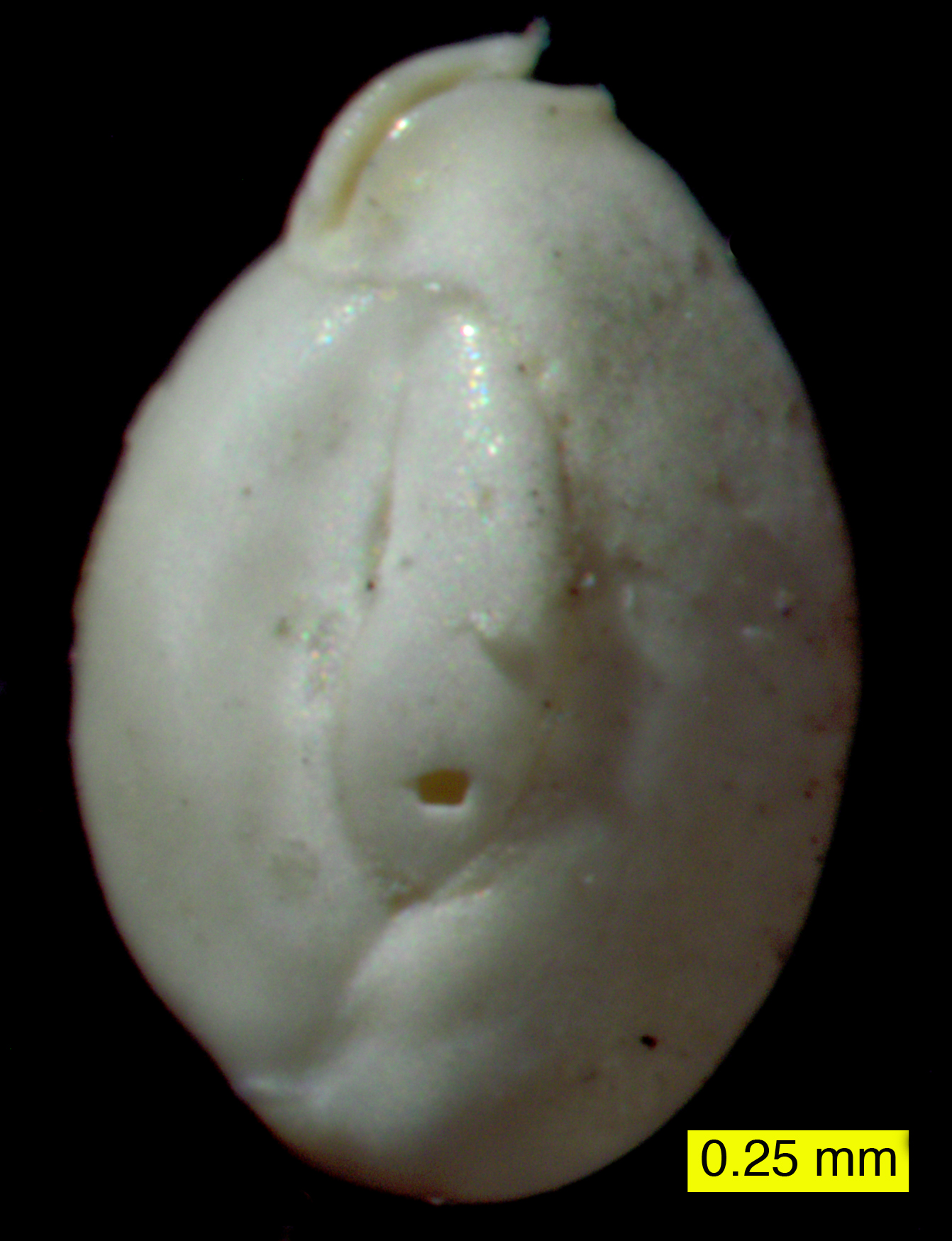
- Quinqueloculina sp. from Donegal Bay, Ireland

Scientific classification
- Domain: Eukaryota
- Supergroup: Rhizaria
- Phylum: Foraminifera
- Class: Tubothalamea
- Order: Miliolida
- Family: Miliolidae
- Subfamily: Quinqueloculininae
- Genus: Quinqueloculina d'Orbigny, 1826

= Quinqueloculina =

Genus of single-celled organisms

Quinqueloculina is a genus of foraminifera in the family Miliolidae.

As with all miliolids the test of Quinqueloculina is composed of imperforate, porcelaneous calcite, often giving them a yellowish tint. As with the Miliolidae, the chambers are arranged in various planes, with two chambers per whorl. In Quinqueloculins the chambers are in planes set 72 degrees apart, but successive chambers are in planes separated by 144 degrees. The name Quinqueloculina comes from quinque, the Latin for five. In Quinqueloculina five chambers are exposed to view on the outside, although the earlier three are sandwiched between the later two, one on one side, two on the other. Chambers are generally long and tubular, normally without integral floors, that function made by the underlying chamber.

Some 30 or more species of Quinqueloculina have been named.

Quinqueloculina is found in abundance around the coasts of the UK. High concentrations of one species of Quinqueloculina within the Celtic Sea are interpreted as a seasonal indicator of strong vertical mixing in that water body.

In an experiment, trends in diversity, abundance and taxonomic composition of live foraminiferal assemblages were analyzed to replicate corer samples collected at the Porcupine Abyssal Plain over a thirteen-year period. Conclusions found that the miliolid Quinqueloculina sp. was virtually absent in multicore samples from 1989 to 1994, peaked in September 1996 (22%) when degraded phytodetritus was present on core surfaces, was less common in March 1997, and thereafter was relatively uncommon. However, horizontally sliced box-core samples revealed that large specimens were more abundant in March 1997, and also were concentrated in deeper sediment layers, than in September 1996. It is suggested that Quinqueloculina sp. migrated to the sediment surface in response to a 1996 flux event, grew, and reproduced, before migrating back into deeper layers as the phytodetrital food became exhausted. Overall, the abyssal time-series revealed decadal-scale changes among shallow-infaunal foraminifera, more or less coincident with changes in the megafauna, as well as indications of shorter-term events related to seasonally-pulsed phytodetrital inputs.

There is biostratigraphic distribution. Which expands these experiments. there is the range bar and triangles indicate. the range bar shows the pink interval and the green interval both occurs in. While triangles shows the placements.

== See also ==
- List of prehistoric foraminiferans
