= Trochamminidae =

Scientific classification
- Domain: Eukaryota
- Clade: Diaphoretickes
- Clade: SAR
- Clade: Rhizaria
- Phylum: Retaria
- Subphylum: Foraminifera
- Class: Globothalamea
- Order: Lituolida
- Superfamily: Trochamminoidea
- Family: Trochamminidae; Schwager, 1877

Genus of single-celled organisms

Trochamminidae is a family of Foraminifera.

== Taxonomy ==
Some included genera are:

- Carterina
- Tritaxis
