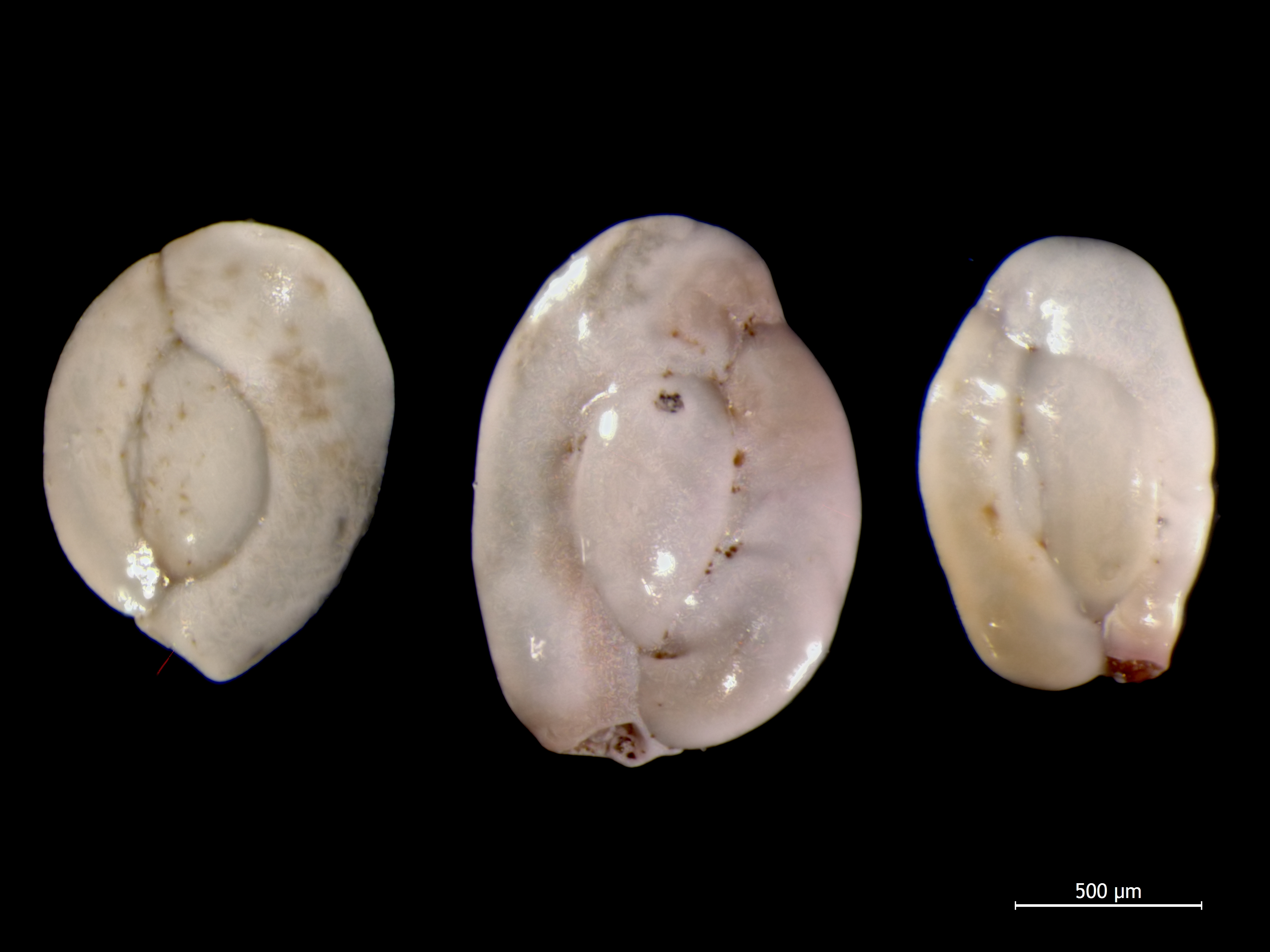
- Quinqueloculina seminula

Scientific classification
- Domain: Eukaryota
- Clade: Diaphoretickes
- Clade: Sar
- Clade: Rhizaria
- Phylum: Retaria
- Subphylum: Foraminifera
- Class: Tubothalamea
- Order: Miliolida
- Suborder: Miliolina
- Superfamily: Milioloidea; Ehrenberg, 1839

Families
- Austrotrillinidae; Hauerinidae; Miliolechinidae; Miliolidae; Riveronidae; Spiroloculinidae

Synonyms
- Miliolacea

= Milioloidea =

Milioloidea Temporal range: Late Triassic - Holocene

Superfamily of single-celled organisms

Milioloidea is one of five superfamilies belonging to the Miliolida, (suborder Miliolina in Loeblich & Tappan 1988).

Milioloideans produce a coiled test, commonly with two, less frequently three or more, chambers per whorl arranged in varying planes about the longitudinal axis, which later may become involute or uncoil. Advanced forms may have secondary partitions within the chambers.

Species within the Milioloidea are found in Upper Triassic (Norian) to recent marine sediments.
