= Carterinida =

Carterinida Temporal range: Campanian–recent

Scientific classification
- Domain: Eukaryota
- Clade: Diaphoretickes
- Clade: SAR
- Clade: Rhizaria
- Phylum: Retaria
- Subphylum: Foraminifera
- Class: Globothalamea
- Order: Carterinida; Loeblich & Tappan, 1981
- Family: Carterinidae; Loeblich & Tappan, 1955

Genera
- Carterina; Zaninettia

Order of single-celled organisms

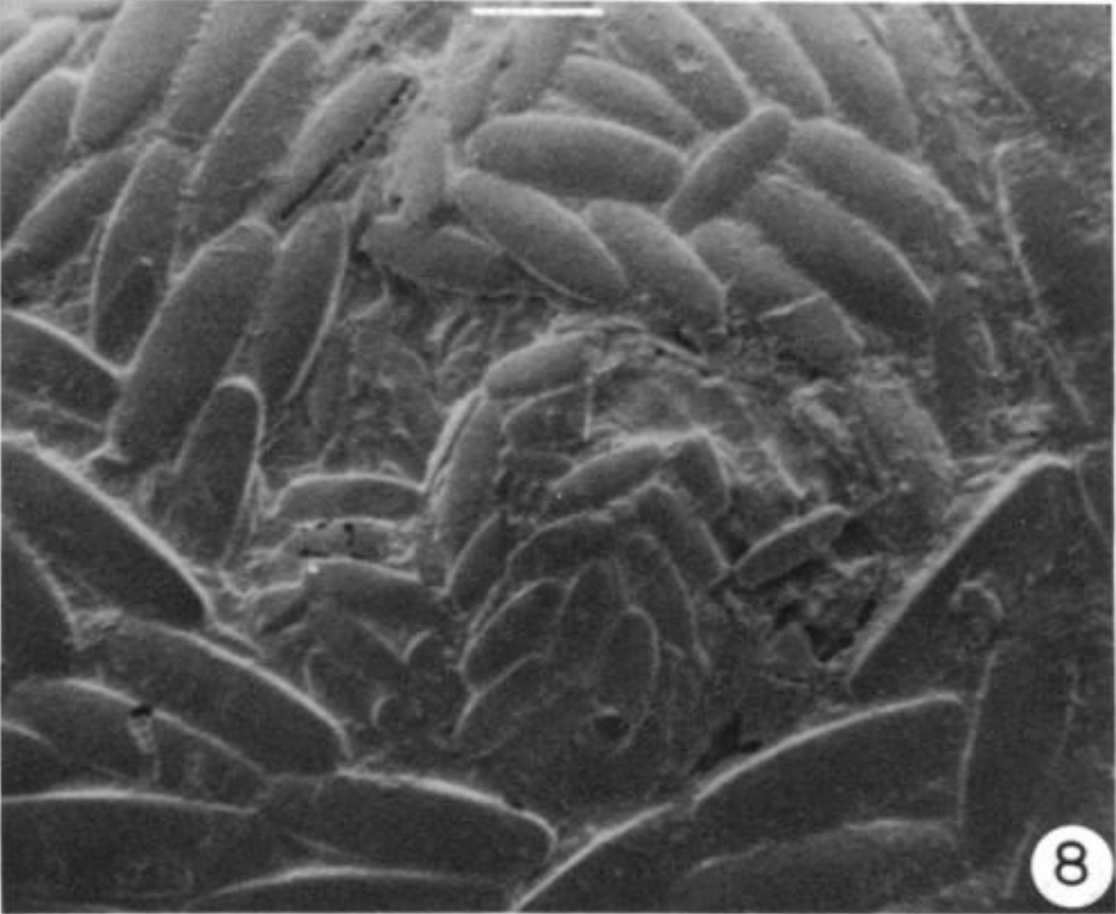
SEM photomicrograph of the test wall of Carterina spiculotesta, showing spicules in the organic matrix of the test.

Carterinida is an order of multi-chambered foraminifera within the Globothalamea. Members of this order form hard tests out of thin calcite rods known as spicules, which are held together by a proteinaceous matrix. As of August 2023, the order contains a single family, Carterinidae.

The spicules of carterinids have been a source of debate; as they are held together by a protein matrix, it has been suggested that the test is created by agglutinating spicules from the amoebozoan Trichosphaerium. However, life observations of carterinids have failed to find evidence of agglutination, and members of the group have been found to grow on artificial substrates where such spicules were not available from the environment. This suggests the spicules are instead created by the carterinids themselves.

The spicules of carterinids are formed of low-magnesium calcite and have "blebs" of organic matter within. Two sizes of spicules are present; smaller spicules are packed tightly between the larger spicules. Spicules appear to have been produced within the cell and moved to their position, as they are rounded and adjacent spicules are not connected.

Carterinids were long considered to be represented by a single genus, Carterina. However, the genus Zaninettia was described in 1983 as a second carterinid genus characterised by the presence of secondary septa. This was not unanimously accepted by all researchers; however, a 2014 genetic study found two species of Zaninettia to form distinct genetic groups closely related to Carterina. This study also found Carterinida to be a distinct group within the Globothalamea, and identified several unnamed "Trochamminids" as likely members of the clade.

Carterina and Zaninettia can be further distinguished by the shape of their spicules: those of Carterina are ovoid in cross-section, while those of Zaninettia are "rounded-rectangular".

Fossils of Carterinids (specifically Carterina) from the Ceara and Potiguar basins off the coast of Brazil date back to the Campanian, and possibly to the Cenomanian.
