= Tritaxis (foraminifera) =

Scientific classification
- Domain: Eukaryota
- Clade: Diaphoretickes
- Clade: SAR
- Clade: Rhizaria
- Phylum: Retaria
- Subphylum: Foraminifera
- Class: Globothalamea
- Order: Lituolida
- Family: Trochamminidae
- Subfamily: Trochammininae
- Genus: Tritaxis; Schubert, 1921

Type species
- Rotalina fusca Williamson, 1858

Genus of single-celled organisms

Tritaxis is a genus in the family Trochamminidae, and subfamily Trochammininae.
