= Carterina =

Scientific classification
- Domain: Eukaryota
- Clade: Diaphoretickes
- Clade: SAR
- Clade: Rhizaria
- Phylum: Retaria
- Subphylum: Foraminifera
- Class: Globothalamea
- Order: Lituolida
- Family: Trochamminidae
- Subfamily: Carterininae; Loeblich & Tappan, 1964
- Genus: Carterina; Brady, 1884

Type species
- Carterina spiculotesta (Carter, 1877) Brady, 1884

Genus of single-celled organisms

Carterina is a genus in the family Trochamminidae, composing its own subfamily Carterininae. The genus is described from specimens gathered during the Challenger expedition's circumnavigation of the Earth from 1872-1876.

The test (or shell) of Carterina begins as a low, free, umbilicate trochospiral (concavo-convexly coiled with a central depression) in the early growth stage, becoming attached and spreading irregularly in later stages. Chambers become partially subdivided by secondary septa, reaching as many a 15 per chamber in later chambers.(Loeblich & Tappan 1964, 1988) Walls are composed of two sizes of fusiform spicules of low-Mg calcite, larger structural spicules in a ground mass of smaller spicules. The spicules are secreted by the protoplasm, crystallographic c-axes parallel to the elongation, and set parallel to the test surface.

Carterina is known from the Eocene of Spain and is widespread in shallow tropical waters in the Holocene, but is unknown from intervening epochs.

Carterina was previously included in the Geological Society of America's Treatise on Invertebrate Paleontology part C. in the Rotaliida as the superfamily Carterinacea.
