= Test (biology) =

Hard shell of some spherical marine animals

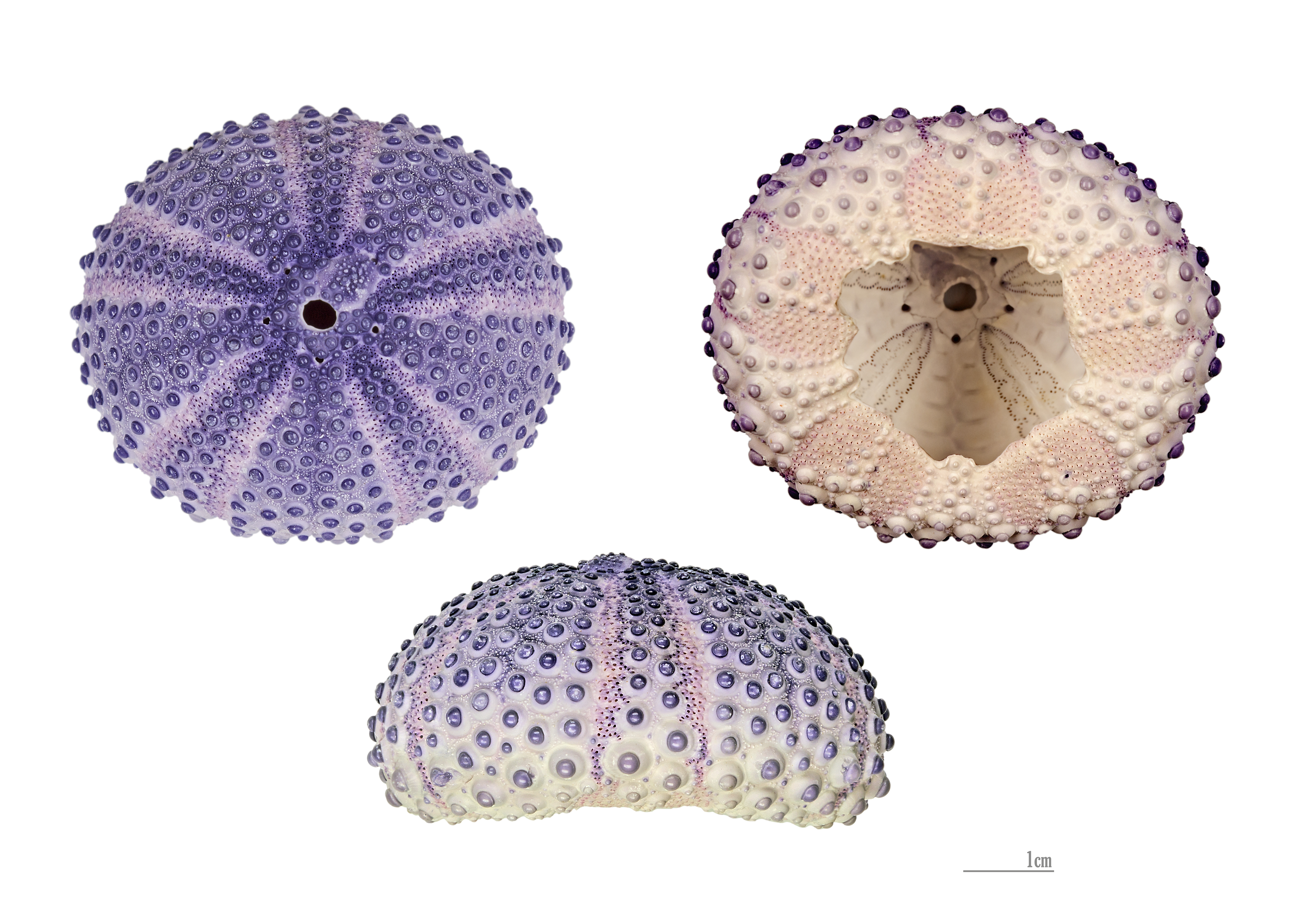
Test of a shingle urchin (Colobocentrotus atratus)

In biology, a test is the hard shell of some spherical aquatic animals and protists, notably sea urchins and microorganisms such as testate foraminiferans, radiolarians, and testate amoebae. The term is also applied to the covering of scale insects. The related Latin term testa is used for the outer layer of the hard seed coat of plant seeds.

== Etymology ==
The anatomical term "test" derives from the Latin word testa, which refers to an earthenware object, for example, a piece of pottery, a tile, or a potsherd, and by extension, the shell of a mollusc or a skull.

== Structure ==
The test is a skeletal structure, made of hard material such as calcium carbonate, silica, chitin or composite materials. As such, it allows the protection of the internal organs and the attachment of soft flesh.

The structure is notable for its ambulacra, alternating in wide and narrow patterns. Small serrations, bumps, ridges or thorns are frequently found along the outer cortex. Magnesium calcites in the structures share three common features: lack of uniformity in Mg distribution, calcite minerals that maintain crystallographic orientations, and formation of Mg-calcites that are thermodynamically unstable.

== In sea urchins ==
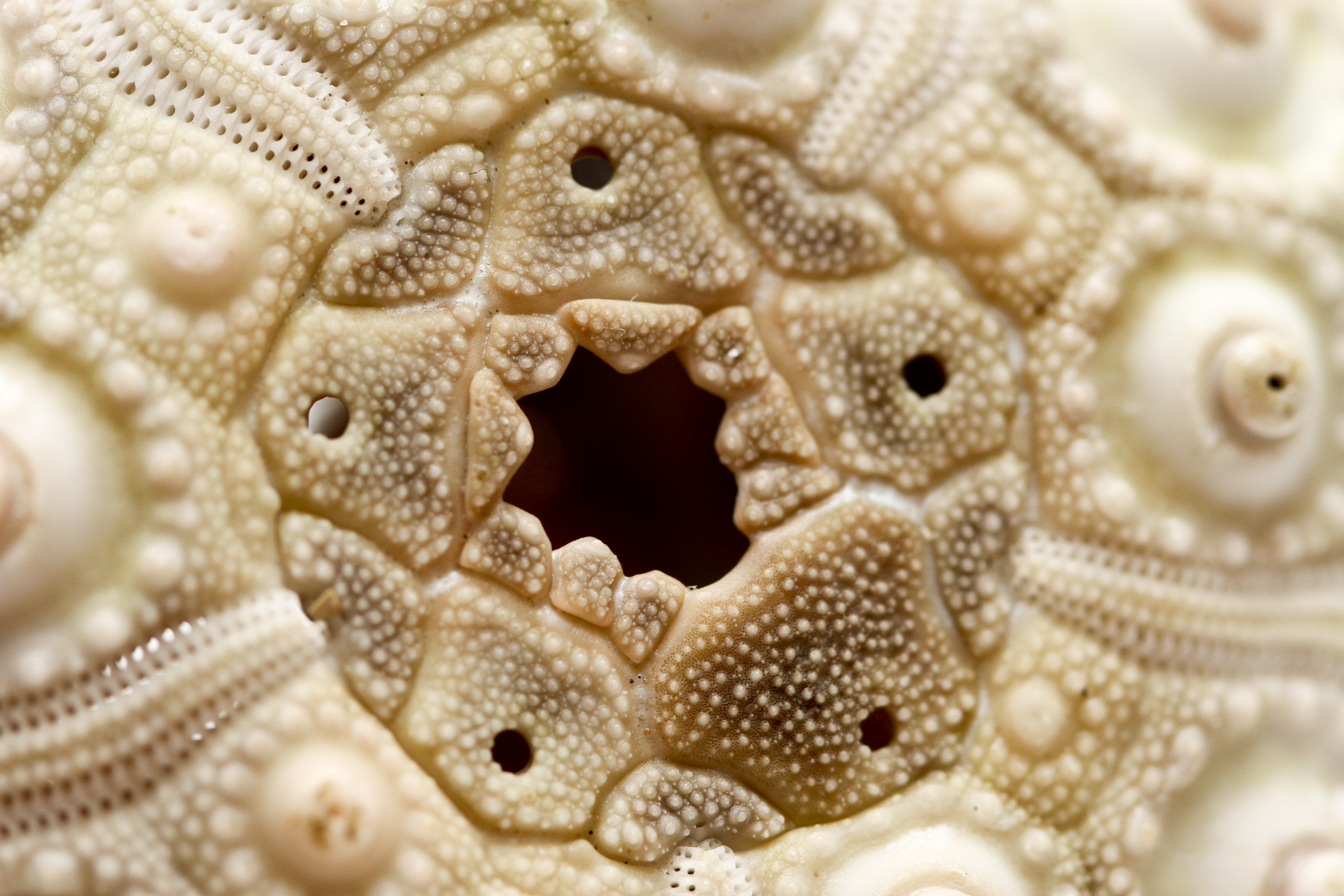
Sea urchin test detail. External plates made of carbonate, silica, and chitin create a dense protective layer that is often covered in serrations, ridges and spines.

The test of sea urchins is made of calcium carbonate, strengthened by a framework of calcite monocrystals, in a characteristic "stereomic" structure. These two ingredients provide sea urchins with a great solidity and a moderate weight, as well as the capacity to regenerate the mesh from the cuticle.

According to a 2012 study, the skeletal structures of sea urchins consist of 92% of "bricks" of calcite monocrystals (conferring solidity and hardness) and 8% of a "mortar" of amorphous lime (allowing flexibility and lightness). This lime is constituted itself of 99.9% of calcium carbonate, with 0.1% structural proteins, which make sea urchins animals with an extremely mineralized skeleton (which also explains their excellent conservation as fossils).. The endoskeletal matrix is formed by spicules of calcite and extracellular matrix proteins that form concentric folded layers.

== In foraminifera ==
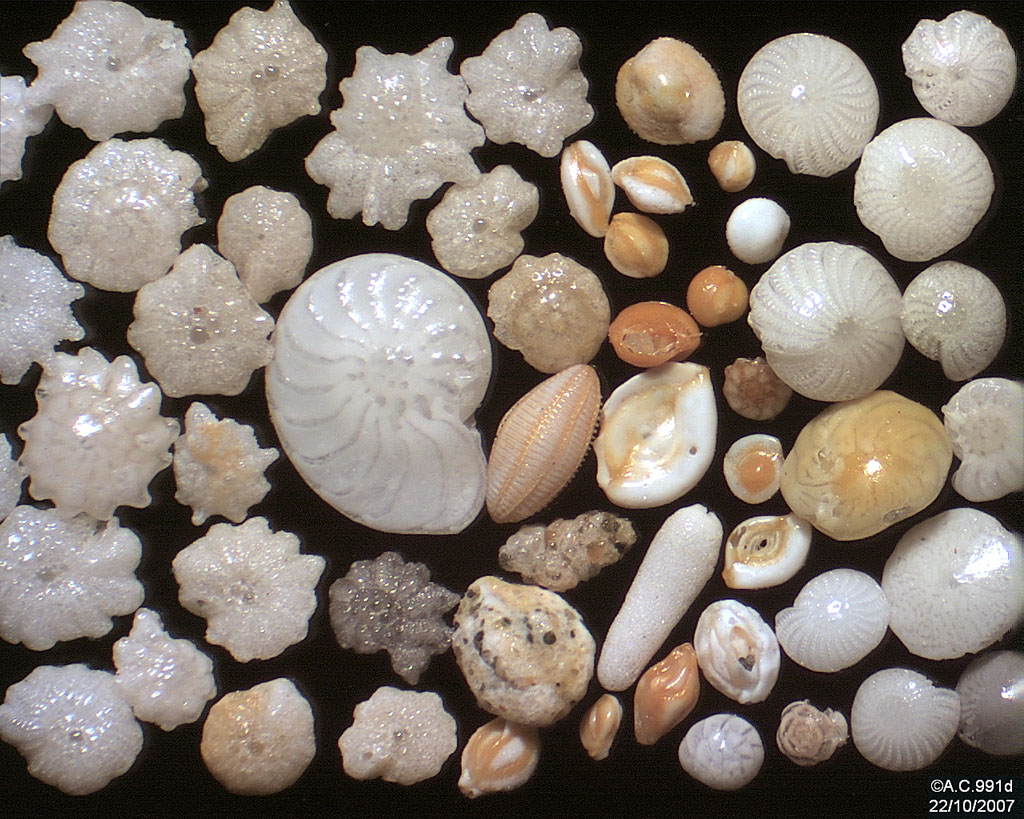
Foraminiferan tests.

The test of foraminifera, a group of single-celled organisms, is extremely evolutionarily diverse. Many different methods of constructing the test are present, from lacking a test in Reticulomyxa, proteinaceous tests in the "allogromiids", agglomerated tests made from foreign particles in many groups including textulariids, silica tests in silicoloculinids, and aragonite or calcite tests in many forms including miliolids and rotaliids. It can be of many types, including proteinaceous, agglutinated (exogenous agglomerate), porcelain-like (smooth calcite) or hyalin (lens).

Foraminifera with multi-chambered tests are referred to as multilocular and develop by building new chambers in their test. These are arranged according to a geometry particular to each species: they can be rectilinear, curved, rolled up or cyclic, uniserial or multiserial. These organizational types can also be mixed, or even more complex. Miliolids have a particular arrangement of chambers known as "milioline". The surface of the test can be smooth or textured and may be perforated with small holes.

== In ascidians ==
In ascidians, the sheath is sometimes called test as well and is composed largely of a particular type of cellulose historically termed "tunicine". From 1845 (when this was discovered by Schmidt) until 1958 (when cellulose fibres were found in mammalian connective tissue), ascidians were believed to be the only animals that synthesized cellulose.

== Fossil record ==
Tests are valuable tools in the fossil record used as proxies for reconstructing environmental conditions. Urchins appeared in the Phanerozoic and are globally distributed, and the skeletal nature of their tests allowed for consistent conservation in the fossil record. The rapid growth and incorporation of isotopes including oxygen, magnesium, calcium and carbon allows scientists to evaluate the relative conditions of the oceans throughout Earth's history.

== Effects of climate change ==
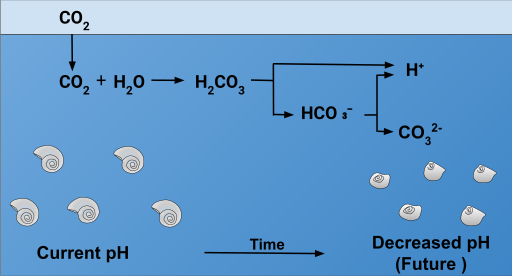
Effects of ocean acidification on calcifying oceanic organisms. Sea urchin tests are expected to be thinner and smaller in light of changing ocean chemistry.

The effects of ocean acidification and sea temperature change can be detrimental to test formation and function due to their incorporation of calcium and carbonate. Increase in pCO2 has decreased structural integrity resulting in skeletal failure. Alteration and decreased test robustness results in lower growth rates and smaller adult diameters of urchin tests.

Other studies indicate that there some species able to adapt to long term exposure to higher acidity, due to evidence of enhanced growth after prolonged proximity to a hydrothermal vent or seasonal hypercapnia events.

== Other terms ==
On a strictly scientific point of view, the term "test" should be restricted to the hard shell protecting sea urchins and foraminiferans. Similar conical, tubular, and vase-shaped structures found in some ciliates or in certain microbial animals such as loriciferans and rotifers are referred to as loricas. For sessile echinoderms (like crinoids, but also many fossile groups such as cystoids or blastoids), the correct word is "theca". For diatoms, the term in use is "frustule", and for radiolarians it should be "capsule". The more common word "shell" is used for mollusks, arthropods and turtles (even if the latter ones belong to the order "Testudines").

== Gallery ==
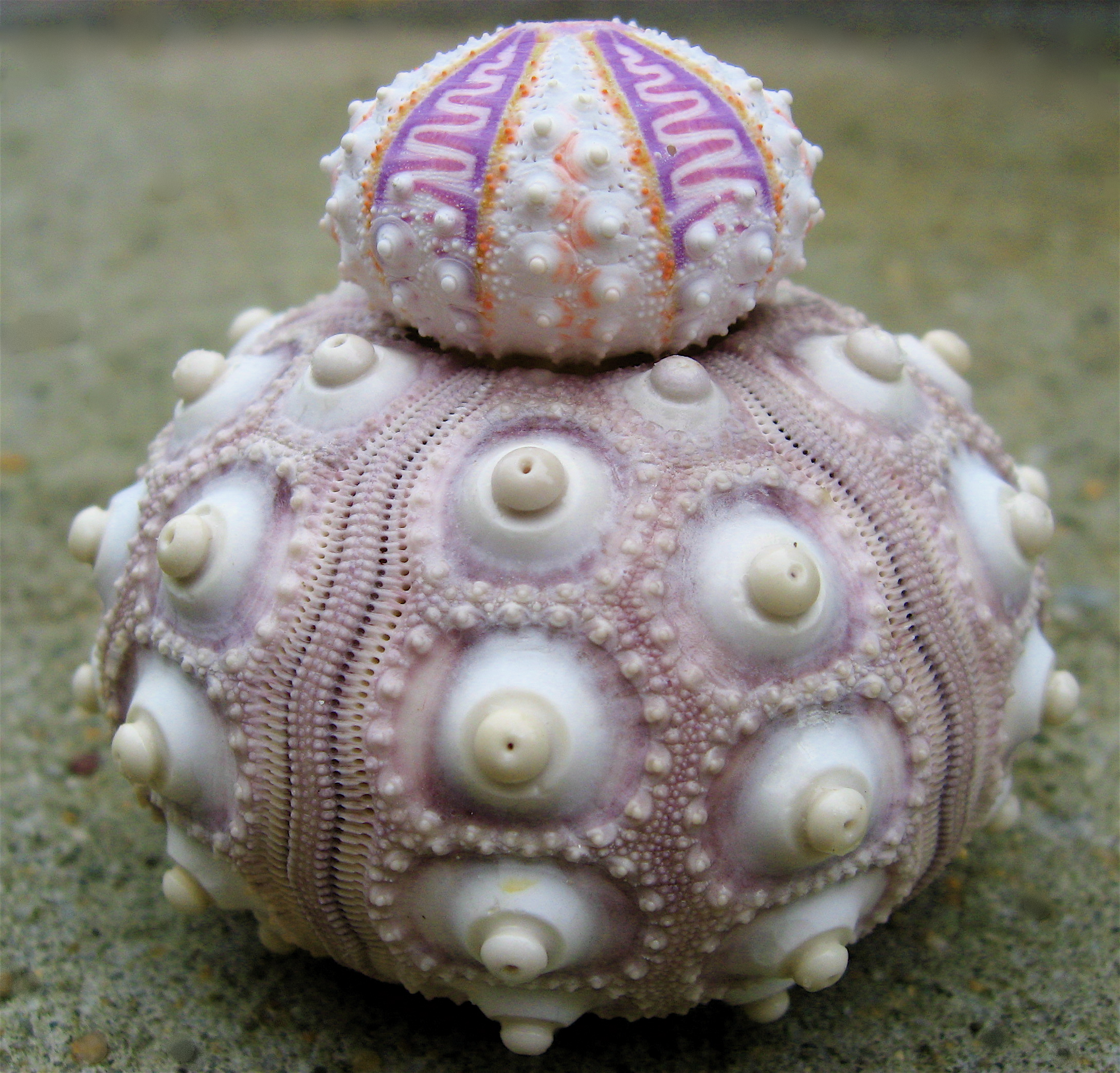
Sea urchin tests (Coelopleurus exquisitus on a Phyllacanthus imperialis).

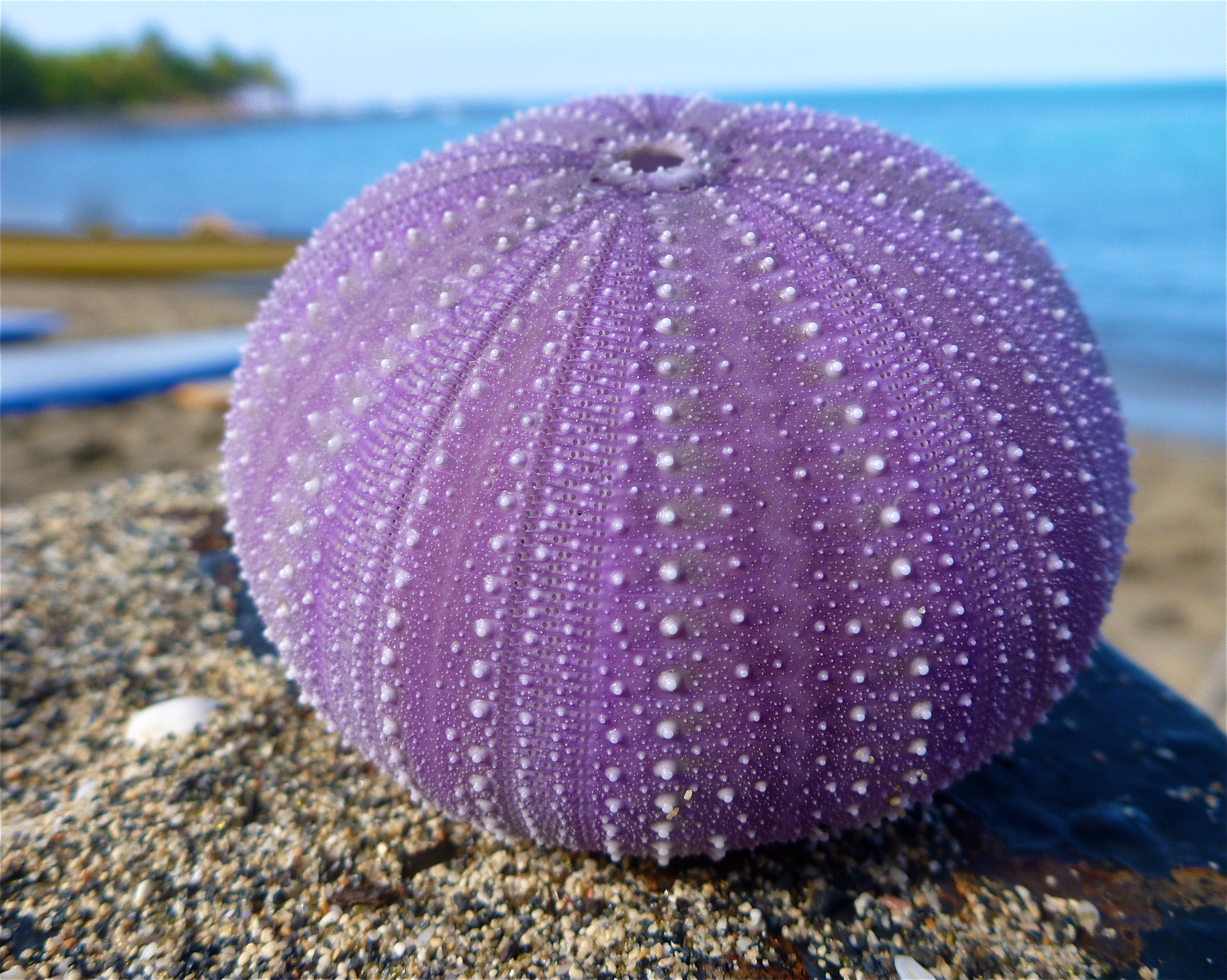
Test of a Tripneustes gratilla.

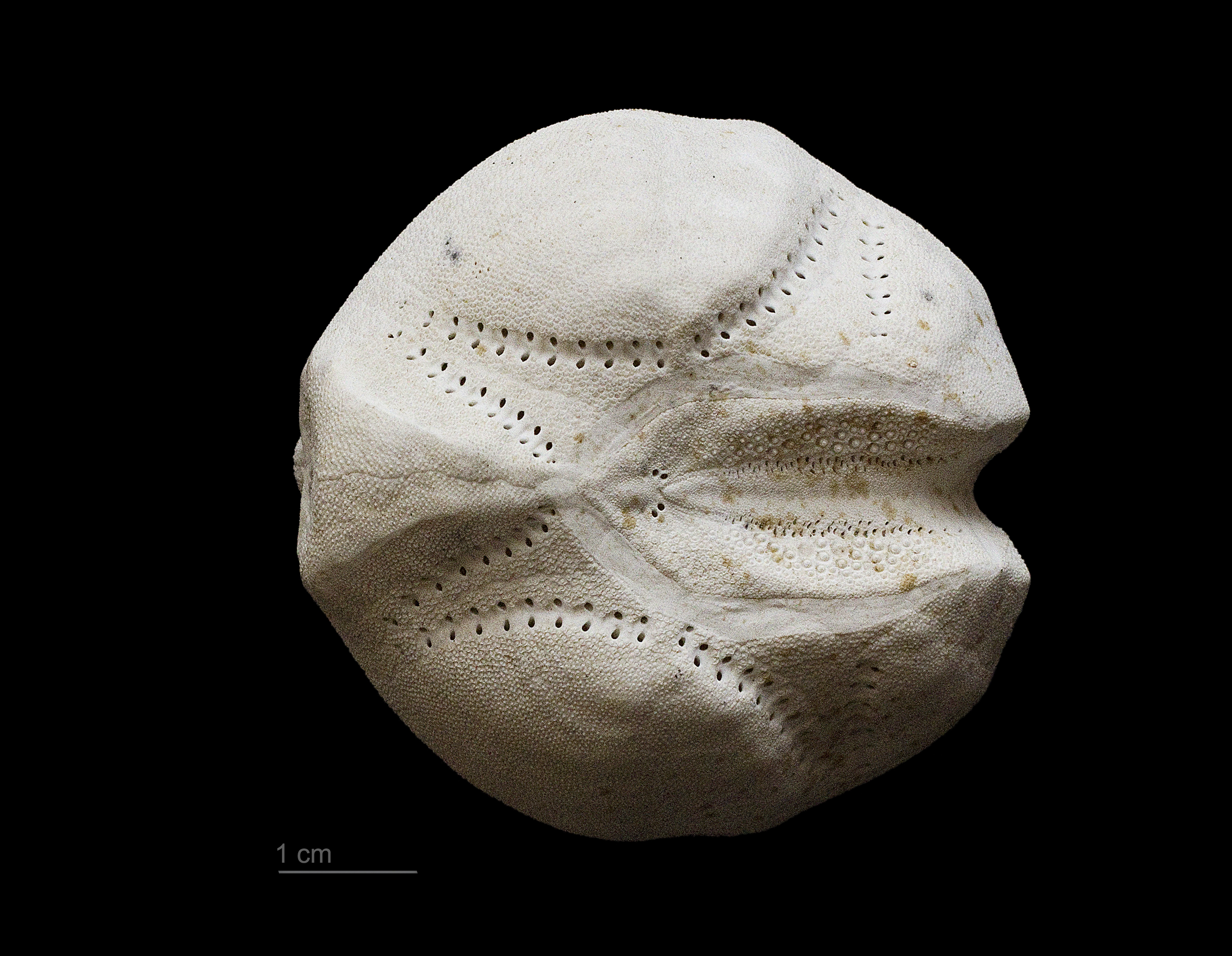
Test of an irregular sea urchin (Echinocardium).

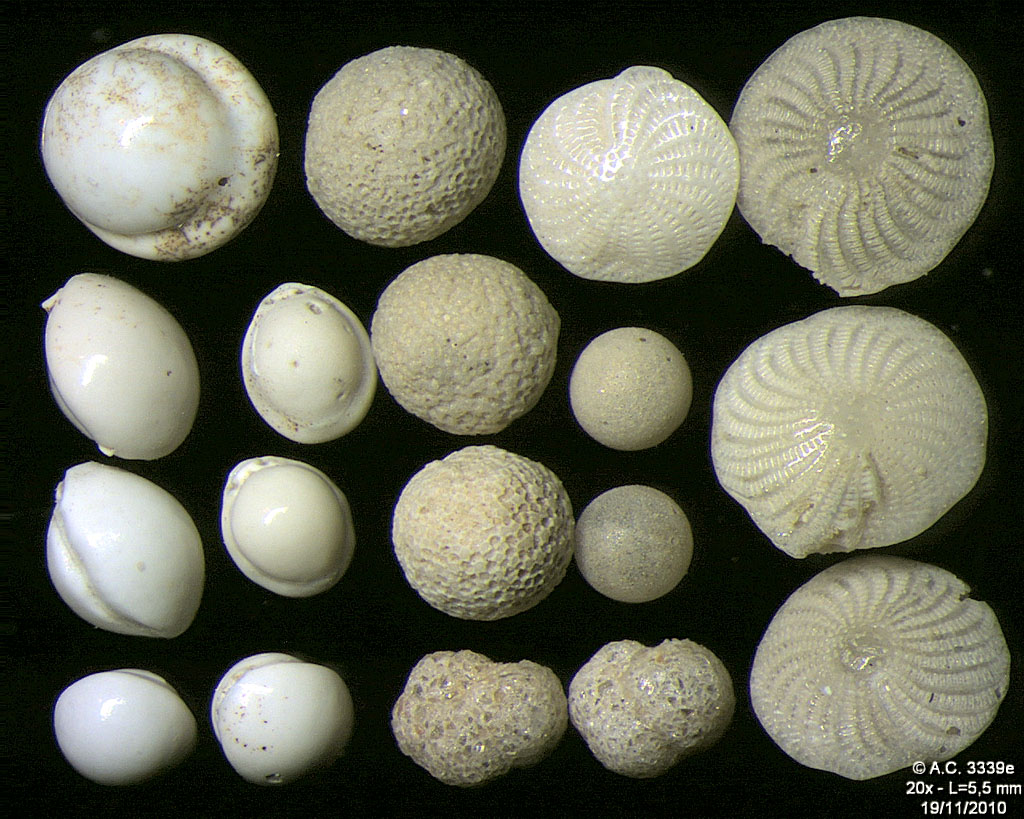
Foraminiferans' tests from the Adriatic Sea.

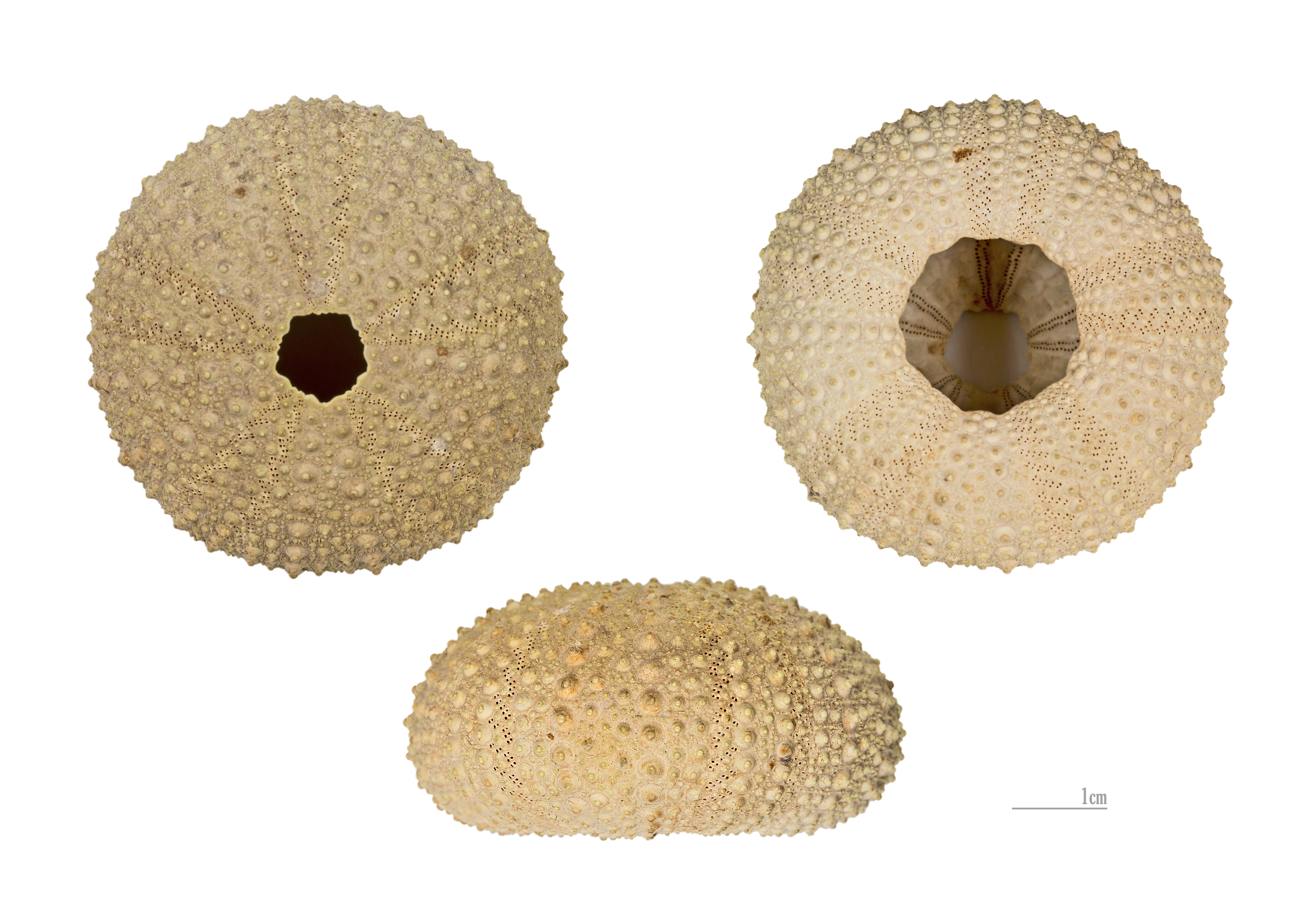
Test of Paracentrotus lividus.

== See also ==
- Frustule
- Lorica (biology)
