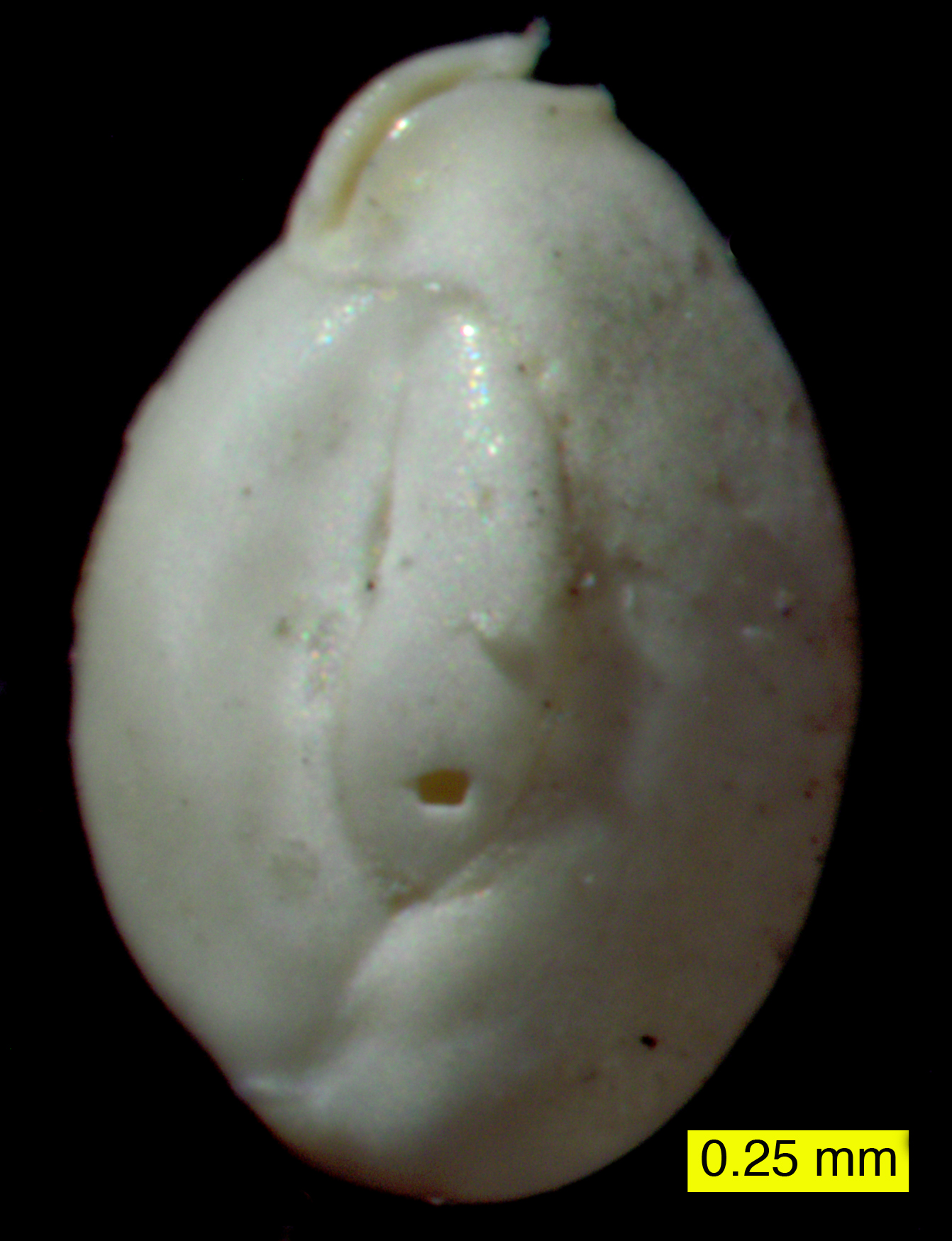
- Quinqueloculina sp. from Donegal Bay, Ireland

Scientific classification
- Domain: Eukaryota
- Clade: Diaphoretickes
- Clade: Sar
- Clade: Rhizaria
- Phylum: Retaria
- Subphylum: Foraminifera
- Class: Tubothalamea
- Order: Miliolida
- Suborder: Miliolina
- Superfamily: Milioloidea
- Family: Miliolidae; Ehrenberg, 1839

Subfamilies
- Fabulariinae; Miliolinae; Miliolinellinae; Quinqueloculininae; Tubinellinae

= Miliolidae =

Family of single-celled organisms

Miliolidae is a family in the superfamily Milioloidea of miliolid foraminifera.
