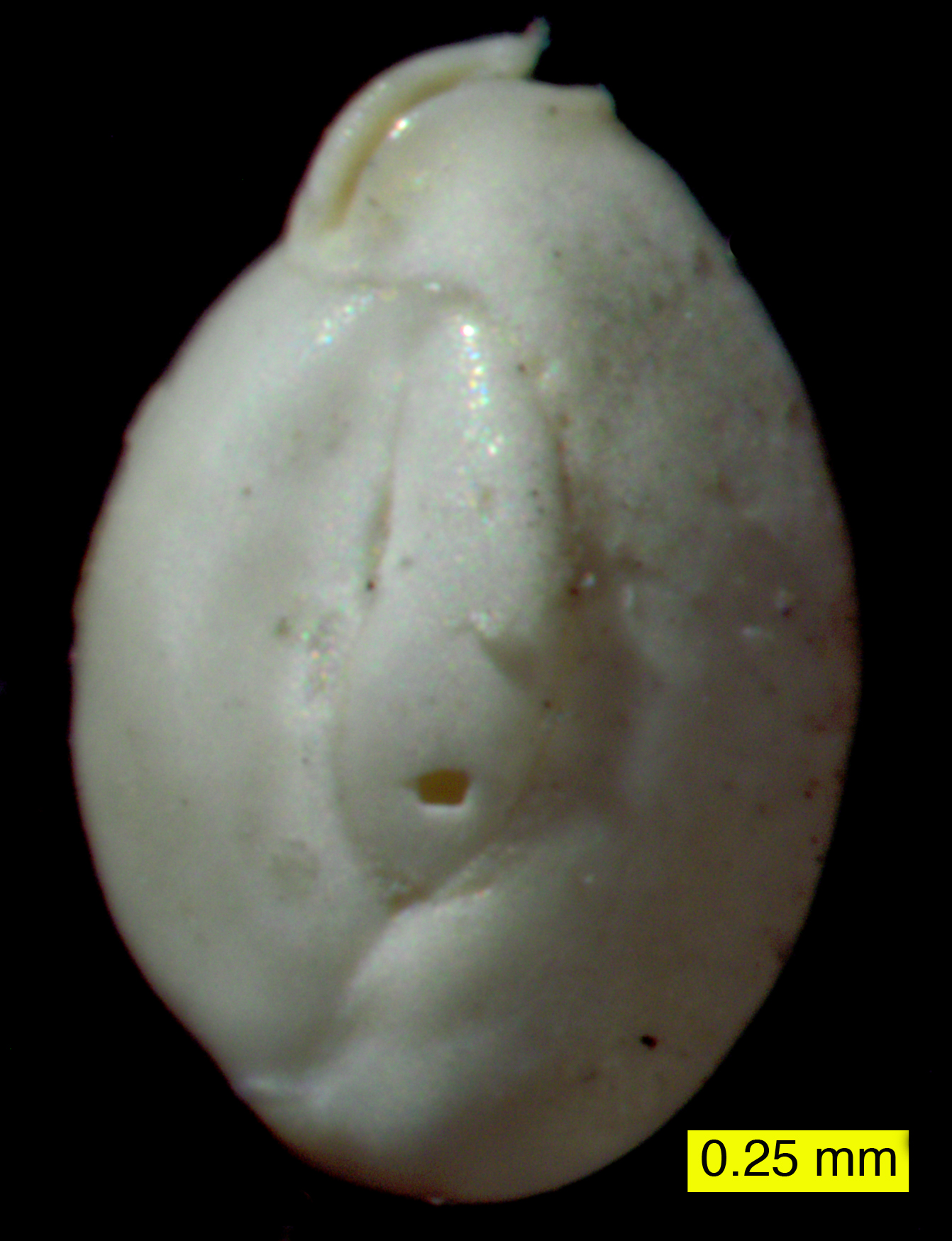
- Quinqueloculina sp. from Donegal Bay, Ireland.

Scientific classification
- Domain: Eukaryota
- Clade: Diaphoretickes
- Clade: Sar
- Clade: Rhizaria
- Phylum: Retaria
- Subphylum: Foraminifera
- Class: Tubothalamea
- Order: Miliolida; Delage & Hérouard, 1896

Suborders and superfamilies
- Miliolina; Alveolinoidea Ehrenberg, 1839; Cornuspiroidea Schultze, 1854 nom. transl. Bogdanovich in Subbotina et al., 1981; Milioloidea Ehrenberg, 1839; Soritoidea Ehrenberg, 1839; Squamulinoidea Reuss & Fritsch, 1861; Nubeculariina; Nubecularioidea Jones in Griffith & Henfrey, 1875; Calcivertelloidea Loeblich & Tappan, 1964 nom. transl. Vachard, 2016 †; Silicoloculinina; Silicoloculinidae Resig et al., 1980

= Miliolida =

Miliolida Temporal range: Carboniferous - Recent

Order of single-celled organisms

The Miliolida are an order of foraminifera with calcareous, porcelacous tests that are imperforate and commonly have a pseudochitinous lining. Tests are composed of randomly oriented calcite needles that have a high proportion of magnesium along with organic material. Tests lack pores and generally have multiple chambers.

Miliolids, which range from the Carboniferous to recent, are benthic Foraminifera abundant in shallow waters such as in estuaries and along coastlines, though they also include deepwater oceanic forms.
