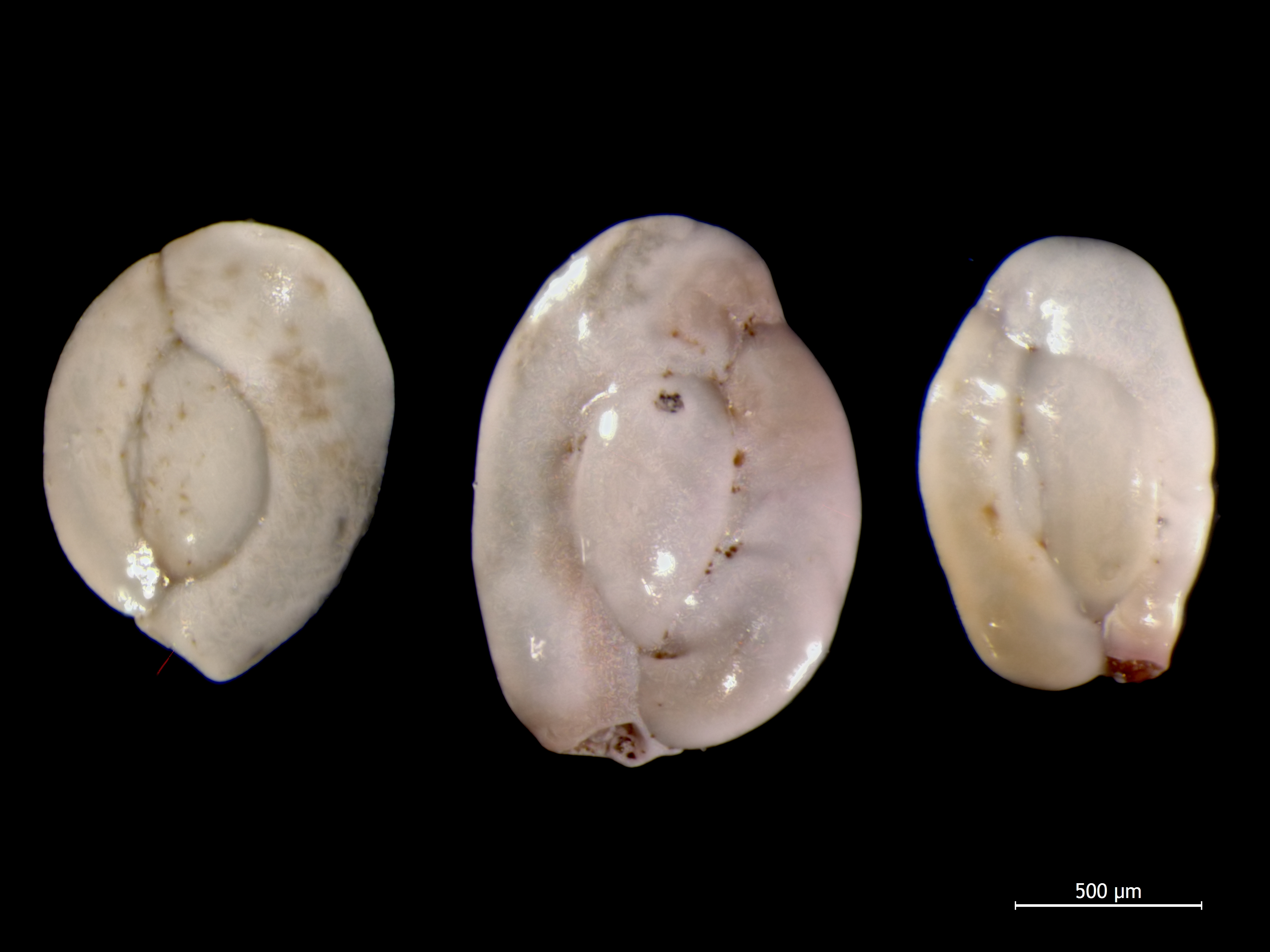
- Quinqueloculina seminula

Scientific classification
- Domain: Eukaryota
- Clade: Sar
- Clade: Rhizaria
- Phylum: Retaria
- Subphylum: Foraminifera
- Class: Tubothalamea; Pawlowski, Holzmann & Tyszka, 2013

Orders
- Miliolida; Spirillinida

= Tubothalamea =

Tubothalamea Temporal range: Mississippian? -Recent

Class of single-celled organisms

Tubothalamea is a taxonomic class established for foraminiferans with tubular chambers. Includes the porcelaceous and agglutinated Miliolida and the monocrystalline and agglutinated Spirillinida. It is one of two classes of multichambered foraminifera based on SSU rDNA molecular studies with consideration of major morphological trends, the other being the Globothalamea.
