= 2014 in arthropod paleontology =

This list of fossil arthropods described in 2014 is a list of new taxa of trilobites, fossil insects, crustaceans, arachnids and other fossil arthropods of every kind that were described during the year 2014. The list only includes taxa at the level of genus or species.

== Arachnids ==
=== Newly named taxa ===
Name	Novelty	Status	Authors	Age	Type locality	Country	Notes	Images
Baalzebub? mesozoicum	Sp. nov	Valid	Penney	Cretaceous (middle Cenomanian to early Santonian)		France	A spider of uncertain placement. Originally described as a ray spider; Wunderlich & Müller (2020) transferred it to the family Zarqaraneidae.	
Cheirolepidoptus	Gen. et sp. nov	Valid	Sidorchuk & Lindquist in Sidorchuk et al.	Late Triassic (Carnian)		Italy	A Tetrapodili mite The type species is C. dolomiticus.	
Feaella (Tetrafeaella) groehni	Sp. nov	Valid	Henderickx in Henderickx & Boone	Eocene	Baltic amber	Europe	A feaellid pseudoscorpion	
Hastocularis	Gen. et sp. nov	Valid	Garwood et al.	Carboniferous (late Stephanian)		France	A Tetrophthalmi Opiliones. The type species is H. argus.	
Kronocharon	Gen. et sp. nov	Valid	Engel & Grimaldi	Cretaceous (latest Albian or earliest Cenomanian)	Burmese amber	Myanmar	An Amblypygi originally assigned to Neoamblypygi excluded from this group by Garwood et al., 2017). The type species is Kronocharon prendinii.	
Mayachernes	Gen. et sp. nov	Jr synonym	Riquelme et al.	Miocene	Mexican amber	Mexico	A chernetid pseudoscorpion. The type species is Mayachernes maatiatus. Moved to Byrsochernes maatiatus by Judson (2016)	
Minyacarus	Gen. et sp. nov	Valid	Sidorchuk & Lindquist in Sidorchuk et al.	Late Triassic (Carnian)		Italy	A Tetrapodili mite. The type species is M. aderces.	
Montsecarachne	Gen. et sp. nov	Valid	Selden	Early Cretaceous (c. 129 Ma)	El Montsec	Spain	Originally described as a plectreurid spider, subsequently considered to be a member of the crown group of Synspermiata of uncertain affinities. The type species is M. amicus.	
?Opilioacarus groehni	Sp. nov	Valid	Dunlop & Bernardi	Late Cretaceous (Cenomanian)	Burmese amber	Myanmar	An opilioacarid mite.	
Paracharonopsis	Gen. et sp. nov	Valid	Engel & Grimaldi	Eocene (Ypresian)	Cambay Shale Formation	India	A Paracharontidae Amblypygi. The type species is P. cambayensis.	
Paratrombium rovniense	Sp. nov	Valid	Konikiewicz & Mąkol	Eocene	Rovno amber	Ukraine	A mite.	
Pleophrynus hawesi	Sp. nov	Valid	Dunlop et al.	Carboniferous (Pennsylvanian)	Astrasado Formation	United States	An eophrynid trigonotarbid.	
Pulchellaranea	Gen. et sp. nov	Valid	Poinar	Cenozoic	Dominican amber	Dominican Republic	An orb-weaver spider. The type species is P. pedunculata.	
Seppo	Gen. et sp. nov	Valid	Selden & Dunlop	Early Jurassic (Toarcian)	Grimmen Formation	Germany	A probable palpimanoidean spider. The type species is S. koponeni.	
Tityus knodeli	Sp. nov	Valid	Lourenço	Miocene	Mexican amber	Mexico	A buthid scorpion.	
Tuckerella fossilibus	Sp. nov	Valid	Khaustov, Sergeyenko & Perkovsky	Eocene	Rovno amber	Ukraine	A peacock mite.	

== Newly named crustaceans ==
Name	Novelty	Status	Authors	Age	Unit	Location	Notes	Images
Acanthaxius carinatus	Sp. nov	Valid	Frantescu	Early Cretaceous (Albian)	Paw Paw Formation	United States	A member of Axiidae, a species of Acanthaxius.	
Acanthochirana liburiaensis	Sp. nov	Valid	Garassino, Audo, Charbonnier & Schweigert in Bravi et al.	Middle Jurassic (Bajocian/Bathonian)	Monte Fallano Plattenkalk	Italy	A member of Aegeridae, a species of Acanthochirana.	
Acanthochirana triassica	Sp. nov	Valid	Garassino, Schweigert & Muscio	Late Triassic (Norian)	Dolomia di Forni Formation	Italy	A member of Aegeridae, a species of Acanthochirana.	
Adamanteryon	Gen. et sp. nov	Valid	Audo et al.	Middle Jurassic	La Voulte-sur-Rhône Lagerstätte	France	A member of Polychelida. The type species is Adamanteryon fourneti.	
Alavatanais margulisae	Sp. nov	Valid	Sánchez-García, Peñalver & Delclòs in Sánchez-García et al.	Early Cretaceous		Spain	A paratanaoid tanaid, a species of Alavatanais.	
Alessandranina	Gen. et comb. nov	Valid	Karasawa et al.	Late Cretaceous (Cenomanian)		United Kingdom	A palaeocorystid crab. The type species is "Notopocorystes" (Cretacoranina) ornatus Wright and Collins (1972).	
Ammopylocheles petersi	Sp. nov	Valid	Fraaije	Late Jurassic (late Kimmeridgian)		Germany	A hermit crab, a species of Ammopylocheles.	
Anisaeger	Gen. et 2 sp. nov	Valid	Schweitzer et al.	Middle Triassic (Anisian)		China	A member of Aegeridae. The type species is Anisaeger brevirostrus; genus also contains Anisaeger spiniferus.	
Annuntidiogenes jurassicus	Sp. nov	Valid	Fraaije	Late Jurassic (late Kimmeridgian)		Germany	A hermit crab, a species of Annuntidiogenes.	
Antrimpos colettoi	Sp. nov	Valid	Garassino, Schweigert & Muscio	Late Triassic (Norian)	Dolomia di Forni Formation	Italy	A member of Penaeidae. Originally described as a species of Antrimpos, but subsequently transferred to the genus Ladinicaris.	
Araripenaeus	Gen. et sp. nov	Valid	Pinheiro, Saraiva & Santana	Early Cretaceous (Albian)	Romualdo Formation	Brazil	A member of Penaeoidea of uncertain phylogenetic placement. The type species is Araripenaeus timidus.	
Arcania kobayashinobuakii	Sp. nov	Valid	Karasawa	Middle Pleistocene	Toyohashi Formation	Japan	A member of Leucosiidae, a species of Arcania.	
Archaeoniscus italiensis	Sp. nov	Valid	Jones, Feldmann & Garassino	Jurassic	Monte Fallano Plattenkalk	Italy	An isopod, a species of Archaeoniscus.	
Ariecornibus	Gen. et sp. nov	Valid	Franţescu	Early Cretaceous (late Albian)		United States	A crab. The type species is Ariecornibus schweitzerae.	
Axiopsis pawpawensis	Sp. nov	Valid	Frantescu	Early Cretaceous (Albian)	Paw Paw Formation	United States	A member of Axiidae, a species of Axiopsis.	
Axiopsis sampsonumae	Sp. nov	Valid	Frantescu	Early Cretaceous (Albian)	Paw Paw Formation	United States	A member of Axiidae, a species of Axiopsis.	
Axiopsis spinifera	Sp. nov	Valid	Frantescu	Early Cretaceous (Albian)	Paw Paw Formation	United States	A member of Axiidae, a species of Axiopsis.	
Bellcarcinus	Gen. et sp. nov	Valid	Luque	Early Cretaceous (late Aptian)	Paja Formation	Colombia	A crab belonging to the group Raninoidia, possibly a member of the family Orithopsidae. The type species is Bellcarcinus aptiensis.	
Belos	Gen. et sp. nov	Valid	Franţescu	Early Cretaceous (late Albian)		United States	A crab. The type species is Belos trispinae.	
Bolbozoe beccata	Sp. nov	Valid	Perrier et al.	Early Silurian		Australia	A myodocope ostracod, a species of Bolbozoe.	
Branchiocarcinus pacificus	Sp. nov	Valid	Nyborg, Ossó & Vega	Late Cretaceous (Maastrichtian)	Moreno Formation	United States	A portunoid crab. Originally described as a member of the family Icriocarcinidae and a species of Branchiocarcinus; Kornecki, Feldmann & Schweitzer (2017) considered the family Icriocarcinidae to be a junior synonym of the family Lithophylacidae and transferred B. pacificus to the genus Lithophylax.	
Brazilestheria	Gen. et comb. nov	Valid	Chen & Shen	Early Cretaceous		Brazil	A clam shrimp belonging to the family Sinoestheriidae. Genus includes "Asmussia" souzae Guerin-Franiatte & Taquet (1993).	
Canalarta	Gen. et sp. nov	Valid	Perrier et al.	Early Silurian		Australia	A myodocope ostracod. The type species is Canalarta papata.	
Candonopsis alagoensis	Sp. nov	Valid	Tomé, Lima Filho & Neumann	Early Cretaceous	Araripe basin	Brazil	An ostracod.	
Cantabroxanthus	Gen. et sp. nov	Valid	Ossó & Díaz Isa	Late Cretaceous (middle Campanian)		Spain	A feldmanniid crab, a relative of etyiids. The type species is Cantabroxanthus loredoensis.	
Casertanus	Gen. et sp. nov	Valid	Garassino, Audo, Charbonnier & Schweigert in Bravi et al.	Middle Jurassic (Bajocian/Bathonian)		Italy	A member of Sergestidae. The type species is Casertanus sabellicus.	
Ceratobairdia crassispinosa	Sp. nov	Valid	Monostori & Tóth	Triassic		Hungary	An ostracod, a species of Ceratobairdia.	
Claudioranina	Gen. et comb. nov	Valid	Karasawa et al.	Eocene (Lutetian-Bartonian)		Italy	A raninid crab. The type species is "Cyrtorhina" oblonga Beschin, Busulini, De Angeli & Tessier (1988).	
Clinocypris epacrus	Sp. nov	Valid	Ayress & Whatley	Early Cretaceous		South Atlantic Ocean (North Falkland Basin)	A non-marine ostracod, a species of Clinocypris.	
Colombicarcinus	Gen. et sp. nov	Valid	Karasawa et al.	Early Cretaceous (Aptian)		Colombia	A necrocarcinid crab. The type species is Colombicarcinus laevis.	
Concinnalepas	Gen. et comb. nov	Valid	Gale	Late Jurassic		United Kingdom	A zeugmatolepadid barnacle. A new genus for "Pollicipes" concinnus Morris (1845).	
Cophinia grekoffi	Sp. nov	Valid	Piovesan, Carbal & Colin in Piovesan et al.	Late Cretaceous (Turonian)	Potiguar Basin	Brazil	A cytherideid ostracod, a species of Cophinia.	
Cophinia ovalis	Sp. nov	Valid	Piovesan, Carbal & Colin in Piovesan et al.	Late Cretaceous (Santonian–Campanian)	Potiguar Basin	Brazil	A cytherideid ostracod, a species of Cophinia.	
Corallomursia	Gen. et sp. nov	Valid	De Angeli & Ceccon	Early Eocene		Italy	A crab belonging to the family Calappidae. Genus includes new species C. eocaena.	
Ctenocheles fritschi	Sp. nov	Valid	Hýžný, Kočová Veselská & Dvořák	Late Cretaceous (Coniacian)	Březno Formation	Czech Republic	A ctenochelid axiidean, a species of Ctenocheles.	
Cycleryon romani	Sp. nov	Valid	Audo et al.	Middle Jurassic	La Voulte-sur-Rhône Lagerstätte	France	A member of Polychelida, a species of Cycleryon.	
Cymothoidana	Gen. et sp. nov	Valid	Jarzembowski et al.	Early Cretaceous	Wealden Supergroup	United Kingdom	A cymothoidan isopod. The type species is Cymothoidana websteri.	
Cypria poietes	Sp. nov	Valid	Ayress & Whatley	Early Cretaceous		South Atlantic Ocean (North Falkland Basin)	A non-marine ostracod, a species of Cypria.	
Cytheropteron paramassoni	Sp. nov	Valid	Yasuhara & Okahashi	Late Quaternary		North Atlantic Ocean (Rockall Plateau)	A cytherurid podocopid ostracod, a species of Cytheropteron.	
Damonella grandiensis	Sp. nov	Valid	Tomé, Lima Filho & Neumann	Early Cretaceous	Araripe basin	Brazil	An ostracod. Originally described as a member of the family Candonidae and a species of Damonella; subsequently transferred to the family Paracyprididae and to the genus Reconcavona.	
Dawsonius tigris	Sp. nov	Valid	Frantescu	Early Cretaceous (Albian)	Paw Paw Formation	United States	A member of Axiidea belonging to the family Ctenochelidae, a species of Dawsonius.	
Devonostenopus	Gen. et sp. nov	Valid	Jones et al.	Devonian	Huntley Mountain Formation	United States	A member of Stenopodidea. The type species is Devonostenopus pennsylvaniensis.	
Dicerobairdia latispinosa	Sp. nov	Valid	Monostori & Tóth	Triassic		Hungary	An ostracod, a species of Dicerobairdia.	
Diogenicheles	gen et sp nov	Valid	Fraaije et al.	Oxfordian		Poland	A parapylochelid hermit crab. The type species is Diogenicheles theodorae.	
Distaeger	Gen. et sp. nov	Valid	Schweitzer et al.	Middle Triassic (Anisian)		China	A member of Aegeridae. The type species is Distaeger prodigiosus.	
Distefania(?) tangishirazensis	Sp. nov	Valid	Jagt et al.	Early Cretaceous (Albian)	Kazhdumi Formation	Iran	A member of Dromioidea, possibly a species of Distefania.	
Distefania(?) vanrijsselti	Sp. nov	Valid	Jagt, Fraaije & van Bakel	Late Cretaceous (late Maastrichtian)	Maastricht Formation	Netherlands	A member of Dromioidea, possibly a species of Distefania.	
Dromia evae	Sp. nov	Valid	Collins	Miocene		Austria	A member of Dromiidae, a species of Dromia.	
Dromiopsis paleogenicus	Sp. nov	Valid	De Angeli & Ceccon	Early Eocene		Italy	A crab belonging to the family Dynomenidae.	
Dundgobiestheria	Gen. et sp. nov	Valid	Li in Li et al.	Probably Middle Jurassic	Eedemt Formation	Mongolia	A clam shrimp. The type species is Dundgobiestheria mandalgobiensis.	
Electrotanais	Gen. et sp. nov	Valid	Sánchez-García, Peñalver & Delclòs in Sánchez-García et al.	Early Cretaceous		Spain	A paratanaoid tanaid. The type species is Electrotanais monolithus.	
Entomozoe bispinosa	Sp. nov	Valid	Wang & Wu	Early Silurian	Shimenkan Formation	China	An ostracod, a species of Entomozoe.	
Entomozoe suboblonga	Sp. nov	Valid	Wang & Wu	Early Silurian	Shimenkan Formation	China	An ostracod, a species of Entomozoe.	
Entomozoe wukeensis	Sp. nov	Valid	Wang & Wu	Early Silurian	Shimenkan Formation	China	An ostracod, a species of Entomozoe.	
Eogordonella	Gen. et sp. nov	Valid	Garassino et al.	Eocene		Iran	A solenocerid penaeoid. The type species is Eogordonella iranianiensis.	
Eomaldivia? friebei	Sp. nov	Valid	Collins	Miocene		Austria	A member of Trapeziidae, possibly a species of Eomaldivia.	
Eonatatolana	Gen. et sp. nov	Valid	Etter	Middle Jurassic		Germany	A cirolanid isopod. The type species is Eonatatolana geisingensis.	
Eopabdehus	Gen. et sp. nov	Valid	Garassino et al.	Eocene		Iran	A penaeid. The type species is Eopabdehus babaheydariensis.	
Eosestheria lushangfenensis	Sp. nov	Valid	Liao, Shen & Huang	Early Cretaceous	Lushangfen Formation	China	A clam shrimp, a species of Eosestheria.	
Epibrachylepas	Gen. et sp. et comb. nov	Valid	Gale in Gale & Sørensen	Late Cretaceous (Campanian and Maastrichtian)		Netherlands; Sweden	A basal balanomorph barnacle. The type species is Epibrachylepas newmani; genus also includes Epibrachylepas smeetsi (Bosquet, 1857).	
Eryma osciensis	Sp. nov	Valid	Garassino, Audo, Charbonnier & Schweigert in Bravi et al.	Middle Jurassic (Bajocian/Bathonian)	Monte Fallano Plattenkalk	Italy	A member of the family Erymidae.	
Etcheslepas	Gen. et sp. et comb. nov	Valid	Gale	Late Jurassic		United Kingdom	A member of Pollicipedidae. Genus contains the new species Etcheslepas durotrigensis, as well as "Zeugmatolepas" fragilis Withers (1928).	
Etisus evamuellerae	Sp. nov	Valid	Hyžný, van Bakel & Guinot	Middle Miocene		Austria; Hungary; Spain?	A member of Xanthidae, a species of Etisus.	
Eucytherura myrsinae	Sp. nov	Valid	Uffenorde in Uffenorde & Radtke	Oligocene		Germany	A cytherurid podocopid ostracod.	
Eucytherura zehali	Nom. nov	Valid	Yasuhara & Okahashi	Late Quaternary		North Atlantic Ocean (Carolina Slope)	A cytherurid podocopid ostracod; a replacement name for Eucytherura hazeli Yasuhara, Okahashi & Cronin (2009).	
Eukloedenella adcapitisdolorella	Sp. nov	Valid	Forel	Early Triassic	Kokarkuyu Formation	Turkey	An ostracod, a species of Eukloedenella.	
Eurotanais	Gen. et sp. nov	Valid	Sánchez-García, Peñalver & Delclòs in Sánchez-García et al.	Early Cretaceous		Spain	A paratanaoid tanaid. The type species is Eurotanais terminator.	
Falklandicypris	Gen. et 2 sp. nov	Valid	Ayress & Whatley	Early Cretaceous		South Atlantic Ocean (North Falkland Basin)	A non-marine ostracod. The type species is Falklandicypris petrasaltata; genus also contains Falklandicypris desiderata.	
Faxelepas	Gen. et comb. nov	Valid	Gale	Late Cretaceous (Maastrichtian) to late Miocene		Denmark; Italy; Netherlands; Spain; Sweden	A barnacle related to verrucomorphs. A new genus for "Pycnolepas" bruennichi Withers (1914); genus also includes "Pycnolepas" paronai De Alessandri (1895).	
Fossocytheridea potiguarensis	Sp. nov	Valid	Piovesan, Carbal & Colin in Piovesan et al.	Late Cretaceous (Santonian–Campanian)	Potiguar Basin	Brazil	A cytherideid ostracod, a species of Fossocytheridea.	
Fossocytheridea tiberti	Sp. nov	Valid	Piovesan, Carbal & Colin in Piovesan et al.	Late Cretaceous (Turonian)	Potiguar Basin	Brazil	A cytherideid ostracod, a species of Fossocytheridea.	
Gangamonocythere	Gen. et sp. nov	Valid	Ayress & Whatley	Early Cretaceous		South Atlantic Ocean (North Falkland Basin)	A non-marine ostracod. The type species is Gangamonocythere colini.	
Glabropilumnus nitidus	Sp. nov	Valid	Collins	Miocene		Austria	A member of Pilumnidae, a species of Glabropilumnus.	
Globotalicypridea mirabilis	Sp. nov	Valid	Silye, Colin & Codrea	Late Cretaceous (Maastrichtian)		Romania	A talicyprideine cypridid ostracod, a species of Globotalicypridea.	
Gracilimanus	Gen. et sp. nov	Valid	Feldmann & Schweitzer in Guyer, Schweitzer & Feldmann	Middle Jurassic (Bajocian/Bathonian)	Gypsum Springs Formation	United States	A member of Astacidea, possibly a member of the family Stenochiridae. The type species is Gracilimanus obscurus.	
Giulianolyreidus	Gen. et comb. nov	Valid	Karasawa et al.	Paleocene (Thanetian)		United States	A lyreidid crab. The type species is "Symethis" johnsoni Rathbun (1935); genus also contains "Symnista" bidentata Rathbun (1935).	
Gypsonicus	Gen. et sp. nov	Valid	Schweitzer & Feldmann in Guyer, Schweitzer & Feldmann	Middle Jurassic (Bajocian/Bathonian)	Gypsum Springs Formation	United States	A member of Astacidea belonging to the family Stenochiridae. The type species is Gypsonicus wyomingensis.	
Harpactocarcinus fedrigoi	Sp. nov	Valid	Beschin, De Angeli & Zorzin	Eocene		Italy	A zanthopsid carpilioid crab, a species of Harpactocarcinus.	
Haughtonileberis dinglei	Sp. nov	Valid	Piovesan, Carbal & Colin in Piovesan et al.	Late Cretaceous (Turonian to Santonian)		Brazil; Nigeria	A trachyleberidid ostracod, a species of Haughtonileberis.	
Hemicytherura viviersae	Sp. nov	Valid	Piovesan, Carbal & Colin in Piovesan et al.	Late Cretaceous (Turonian)	Potiguar Basin	Brazil	A cytherurid ostracod, a species of Hemicytherura.	
Hepatus pauli	Sp. nov	Valid	Collins, Garvie & Mellish	Pleistocene	Beaumont Formation	United States	A member of Aethridae, a species of Hepatus.	
Hourcqia woodi	Sp. nov	Valid	Ayress & Whatley	Early Cretaceous		South Atlantic Ocean (North Falkland Basin)	A non-marine ostracod, a species of Hourcqia.	
Housacheles ovalis	Sp. nov	Valid	Fraaije	Late Jurassic (late Kimmeridgian)		Germany	A hermit crab, a species of Housacheles.	
Hyas chippubetsuensis	Sp. nov	Valid	Kato, Nakashima & Yanagisawa	Early Pliocene	Chippubetsu Formation	Japan	A member of Oregoniidae, a species of Hyas.	
Hyas tentokujiensis	Sp. nov	Valid	Kato, Nakashima & Yanagisawa	Early Pliocene	Tentokuji Formation	Japan	A member of Oregoniidae, a species of Hyas.	
Icenilepas	Gen. et sp. nov	Valid	Gale	Late Cretaceous (Santonian)		United Kingdom	A zeugmatolepadid barnacle. The type species is Icenilepas collinsi.	
Ilhasina? leiodermatus	Sp. nov	Valid	Ayress & Whatley	Early Cretaceous		South Atlantic Ocean (North Falkland Basin)	A non-marine ostracod, possibly a species of Ilhasina.	
Ilyocypris bisulcata	Sp. nov	Valid	Qu et al.	Early Paleocene	Mingshui Formation	China	An ilyocypridid cypridoid ostracod, a species of Ilyocypris.	
Italianira	Gen. et comb. nov	Valid	Karasawa et al.	Eocene (Ypresian)		Italy	A raninid crab. The type species is "Ranilia" punctulata Beschin, Busulini, De Angeli & Tessier (1988).	
Jandairella	Gen. et sp. nov	Valid	Piovesan, Carbal & Colin in Piovesan et al.	Late Cretaceous (Turonian)	Potiguar Basin	Brazil	A trachyleberidid ostracod. The type species is Jandairella obesa.	
Kegelina	Gen. et comb. nov	Valid	de Queiroz Neto, Sames & Colin	Early Cretaceous		Brazil; Gabon; United States	A cypridoid ostracod. A new genus for "Cypridea" anomala Peck (1941), "Cypridea" armata Krömmelbein (1962), "Cypridea" bisculpturata Wicher (1959), "Cypridea" depressa Moura (1972) and "Cypridea" kegeli Wicher (1959).	
Kotoracythere paiki	Sp. nov	Valid	Lee	Pliocene-Pleistocene	Seogwipo Formation	South Korea	An ostracod, a species of Kotoracythere.	
Krausella danukalovae	Sp. nov	Valid	Melnikova & Danukalova	Ordovician		Russia	An ostracod, a species of Krausella.	
Kuzminaella arabieni	Sp. nov	Valid	Groos-Uffenorde in Groos-Uffenorde & Rabien	Devonian		Germany	An ostracod.	
Lepidophthalmus paratethyensis	Sp. nov	Valid	Gašparič & Hyžný	Early Miocene (late Burdigalian)		Slovenia	A member of Callianassidae, a species of Lepidophthalmus.	
Longiscula kazarkina	Sp. nov	Valid	Melnikova & Danukalova	Ordovician		Russia	An ostracod, a species of Longiscula.	
Looneyellopsis tuberculatus	Sp. nov	Valid	Ayress & Whatley	Early Cretaceous		South Atlantic Ocean (North Falkland Basin)	A non-marine ostracod, a species of Looneyellopsis.	
Loxocorniculum? narendrai	Sp. nov	Valid	Piovesan, Carbal & Colin in Piovesan et al.	Late Cretaceous (Turonian)	Potiguar Basin	Brazil	A loxoconchid ostracod, possibly a species of Loxocorniculum.	
Luprisca	Gen. et sp. nov	Valid	Siveter et al.	Ordovician (Katian)	Lorraine Group	United States	A myodocope ostracod. The type species is Luprisca incuba.	
Martillepas	Gen. et comb. nov	Valid	Gale	Late Jurassic		United Kingdom	A zeugmatolepadid barnacle. A new genus for "Calantica" ovalis Withers (1928), "Zeugmatolepas" costata Withers (1928) and "Zeugmatolepas" hollisi Withers (1928).	
Masticacheles	Gen et 2 sp nov	Valid	Fraaije et al.	Oxfordian to Kimmeridgian		Germany; Poland	A parapylochelid hermit crab. The type species is Masticacheles longirostris from Oxfordian of Poland; subsequently a second species Masticacheles minimus from late Kimmeridgian of Germany was named by Fraaije (2014).	
Mesoparapylocheles jaegeri	Sp. nov	Valid	Fraaije	Late Jurassic (late Kimmeridgian)		Germany	A hermit crab, a species of Mesoparapylocheles.	
Mesoparapylocheles schweigerti	Sp. nov	Valid	Fraaije	Late Jurassic (late Kimmeridgian)		Germany	A hermit crab, a species of Mesoparapylocheles.	
Monoceratina hussonae	Sp. nov	Valid	Forel	Early Triassic	Kokarkuyu Formation	Turkey	An ostracod, a species of Monoceratina.	
Montemagrellus	Gen. et sp. nov	Valid	De Angeli & Ceccon	Early Eocene		Italy	A crab belonging to the family Crossotonotidae. Genus includes new species M. denticulatus.	
Muelleristhes	Gen. et comb. nov	Valid	Garassino, De Angeli & Pasini	Late Cretaceous (Cenomanian-Turonian)		Morocco	A porcelain crab; a new genus for "Paragalathea" africana Garassino, De Angeli & Pasini (2008).	
Munidopsis palmuelleri	Sp. nov	Valid	Hyžný et al.	Middle Miocene	Slovenske Gorice Formation	Slovenia	A munidopsid galatheoid, a species of Munidopsis.	
Musacchiocythere	Gen. et comb. nov	Valid	Ayress & Whatley	Early Cretaceous		South Atlantic Ocean (North Falkland Basin)	A non-marine ostracod. The type species is Musacchiocythere sarunata (Musacchio, 1978).	
Neopilumnoplax pohorjensis	Sp. nov	Valid	Gašparič & Hyžný	Early Miocene (late Burdigalian)		Slovenia	A member of Mathildellidae, a species of Neopilumnoplax.	
Nothocarapacestheria	Gen. et sp. nov	Valid	Rohn, Dutra & Cabral	Probably Jurassic	Caturrita Formation	Brazil	A clam shrimp belonging to the family Eosestheriidae. The type species is Nothocarapacestheria soturnensis.	
Occultocaris	Gen. et sp. nov	Valid	Winkler	Late Jurassic (early Tithonian)	Solnhofen Plattenkalk	Germany	A member of Caridea, possibly a bresilioid. The type species is Occultocaris frattigianii.	
Ovocytheridea anterocompressa	Sp. nov	Valid	Piovesan, Carbal & Colin in Piovesan et al.	Late Cretaceous (Santonian–Campanian)	Potiguar Basin	Brazil	A cytherideid ostracod, a species of Ovocytheridea.	
Ovocytheridea posteroprojecta	Sp. nov	Valid	Piovesan, Carbal & Colin in Piovesan et al.	Late Cretaceous (Turonian)	Potiguar Basin	Brazil	A cytherideid ostracod, a species of Ovocytheridea.	
Ovocytheridea reymenti	Sp. nov	Valid	Piovesan, Carbal & Colin in Piovesan et al.	Late Cretaceous		Brazil; Nigeria	A cytherideid ostracod, a species of Ovocytheridea.	
Ovocytheridea triangularis	Sp. nov	Valid	Piovesan, Carbal & Colin in Piovesan et al.	Late Cretaceous (Santonian–Campanian)	Potiguar Basin	Brazil	A cytherideid ostracod, a species of Ovocytheridea.	
Pagurus retznensis	Sp. nov	Valid	Collins	Miocene		Austria	A hermit crab, a species of Pagurus.	
Pagurus texensis	Sp. nov	Valid	Franţescu	Early Cretaceous (late Albian)		United States	A hermit crab, a species of Pagurus.	
Palaega furcillanatis	Sp. nov	Valid	Jones, Feldmann & Garassino	Jurassic	Monte Fallano Plattenkalk	Italy	An isopod, a species of Palaega.	
Palaeogammarus debroyeri	Sp. nov	Valid	Jażdżewski, Grabowski & Kupryjanowicz	Eocene		Probably Russia (Kaliningrad Oblast)	A member of Amphipoda found in Baltic amber, a species of Palaeogammarus.	
Palinurellus bericus	Sp. nov	Valid	De Angeli & Garassino	Eocene (Priabonian)		Italy	A furry lobster, a species of Palinurellus.	
Palladiocarcinus	Gen. et sp. nov	Valid	De Angeli & Ceccon	Early Eocene		Italy	A crab belonging to the family Pilumnidae. Genus includes new species P. brevidentatus.	
Palmunidopsis	Gen. et sp. nov	Valid	Fraaije	Miocene (Tortonian)	Pakhna Formation	Cyprus	A munidopsid galatheoid. The type species is Palmunidopsis muelleri.	
Parabrachylepas	Gen. et comb. nov	Valid<	Gale in Gale & Sørensen	Late Cretaceous (Campanian)		Sweden	A basal balanomorph barnacle. The type species is Parabrachylepas ifoensis (Withers, 1935).	
Paracypris ? krivipotokensis	Sp. nov	Valid	Forel in Sudar et al.	Early Triassic (Olenekian)	Obnica Formation	Serbia	A cypridoid ostracod belonging to the family Paracyprididae, possibly a species of Paracypris.	
Paracypris vietnamensis	Sp nov	Valid	Tanaka & Komatsu in Shigeta et al.	Early Triassic (Olenekian)	Bac Thuy Formation	Vietnam	An ostracod, a species of Paracypris.	
Paraplesiocypridea	Gen. et sp. nov	Valid	Ayress & Whatley	Early Cretaceous		South Atlantic Ocean (North Falkland Basin)	A non-marine ostracod. The type species is Paraplesiocypridea alloios.	
Parapylochelitergites deductius	Sp. nov	Valid	Fraaije	Late Jurassic (late Kimmeridgian)		Germany	A hermit crab, a species of Parapylochelitergites.	
Parapylochelitergites prepustulosus	Sp. nov	Valid	Fraaije	Late Jurassic (late Kimmeridgian)		Germany	A hermit crab, a species of Parapylochelitergites.	
Paraxiopsis erugatus	Sp. nov	Valid	Frantescu	Early Cretaceous (Albian)	Paw Paw Formation	United States	A member of Axiidae, a species of Paraxiopsis.	
Parsacus	Gen. et sp. et comb. nov	Valid	Garassino et al.	Eocene		Iran; Italy	A slipper lobster. Genus contains new species Parsacus eocenicus, as well as "Parribacus" cristatus Förster (1984).	
Pauline nivisis	Sp. nov	Valid	Perrier et al.	Silurian (late Telychian)	Pentamerus Bjerge Formation	Greenland	A cylindroleberidid myodocope ostracod, a species of Pauline.	
Paulinecaris	Gen. et sp. nov	Valid	Waloszek et al.	Cambrian	Orsten	Sweden	An entomostracan of uncertain phylogenetic placement. The type species is Paulinecaris siveterae.	
Pedupycnolepas	Gen. et comb. nov	Valid	Gale	Early Cretaceous (probably early Aptian)		Antarctica (Alexander Island)	A barnacle; a new genus for "Pycnolepas" articulata Collins (1980).	
Periacanthus tetracornis	Sp. nov	Valid	Ferratges et al.	Eocene	Roda Formation	Spain	A crab. Originally assigned to the family Epialtidae and to the genus Periacanthus; Ferratges (2024) assigned it to the subfamily Actinotocarcininae, tentatively placed in the family Majidae, and made it the type species of the separate genus Eoactinotocarcinus.	
Perissocytheridea caudata	Sp. nov	Valid	Piovesan, Carbal & Colin in Piovesan et al.	Late Cretaceous (Turonian)	Potiguar Basin	Brazil	A cytherideid ostracod, a species of Perissocytheridea.	
Perissocytheridea jandairensis	Sp. nov	Valid	Piovesan, Carbal & Colin in Piovesan et al.	Late Cretaceous (Santonian–Campanian)	Potiguar Basin	Brazil	A cytherideid ostracod, a species of Perissocytheridea.	
Perissocytheridea mossoroensis	Sp. nov	Valid	Piovesan, Carbal & Colin in Piovesan et al.	Late Cretaceous (Turonian)	Potiguar Basin	Brazil	A cytherideid ostracod, a species of Perissocytheridea.	
Petrochirus sanctilazzari	Sp. nov	Valid	Baldanza et al.	Early Pleistocene		Italy	A diogenid hermit crab, a species of Petrochirus.	
Petrolisthes albianicus	Sp. nov	Valid	Franţescu	Early Cretaceous (late Albian)		United States	Originally classified as a porcelain crab belonging to the genus Petrolisthes. Robins & Klompmaker (2019) transferred it to the genus Hispanigalathea belonging to the galatheoid family Catillogalatheidae.	
Pilgrimcheles	gen et 3 sp nov	Valid	Fraaije et al.	Oxfordian to Kimmeridgian		Germany; Poland	A parapylochelid hermit crab. The type species is Pilgrimcheles karolinae from Oxfordian of Poland; subsequently additional two species, Pilgrimcheles kersteni and Pilgrimcheles vonmeyeri, were described from Kimmeridgian of Germany by Fraaije (2014).	
Pisidia? subnodosa	Sp. nov	Valid	Collins	Miocene		Austria	A porcelain crab, possibly a species of Pisidia.	
Planobranchia palmuelleri	Sp. nov	Valid	Artal, van Bakel & Onetti	Eocene (Lutetian)	Coll de Malla Formation	Spain	A member of Inachidae, a species of Planobranchia.	
Plioaxius texensis	Sp. nov	Valid	Frantescu	Early Cretaceous (Albian)	Paw Paw Formation	United States	A member of Axiidae, a species of Plioaxius.	
Portunus muelleri	Sp. nov	Valid	Collins	Miocene		Austria	A member of Portunidae, a species of Portunus.	
Potiguarella	Gen. et 2 sp. nov	Valid	Piovesan, Carbal & Colin in Piovesan et al.	Late Cretaceous (Turonian)		Brazil; Gabon	A trachyleberidid ostracod. The type species is Potiguarella grosdidieri; genus also contains Potiguarella coimbrai.	
Priscoverruca	Gen. et comb. et sp. nov	Valid	Gale	Late Cretaceous		Belgium; Germany; Netherlands; United Kingdom	A barnacle. The type species is "Verruca" prisca Bosquet (1854); genus also includes new species P. elongata.	
Procytherura ballentae	Sp. nov	Valid	Piovesan, Carbal & Colin in Piovesan et al.	Late Cretaceous (Turonian)	Potiguar Basin	Brazil	A cytherurid ostracod, a species of Procytherura.	
Protocosta babinoti	Sp. nov	Valid	Piovesan, Carbal & Colin in Piovesan et al.	Late Cretaceous (Santonian–Campanian)	Potiguar Basin	Brazil	A trachyleberidid ostracod, a species of Protocosta.	
Proverruca dentifer	Sp. nov	Valid	Gale	Late Cretaceous (Campanian)		Belgium; Sweden	A barnacle.	
Pylochelitergites exspectatus	Sp. nov	Valid	Fraaije et al.	Late Jurassic (Oxfordian)		Poland	A member of Pylochelidae, a species of Pylochelitergites.	
Pyreneplax	Gen. et sp. et comb. nov	Valid	Ossó, Domínguez & Artal	Eocene		Italy; Spain; United States	A member of Vultocinidae. The type species is P. basaensis; genus also includes P. ranosa (Beschin, Busulini, De Angeli & Tessier, 2002), P. sandersi (Blow & Manning, 1997) and P. sommarugai (Beschin, Busulini & Tessier, 2009).	
Quadratoplanus	Gen. et sp. nov	Valid	Franţescu	Early Cretaceous (late Albian)		United States	A crab. The type species is Quadratoplanus primitivus.	
Retropluma slovenica	Sp. nov	Valid	Gašparič & Hyžný	Early Miocene (late Burdigalian)		Slovenia	A member of Retroplumidae, a species of Retropluma.	
Reviya sylvieae	Sp. nov	Valid	Forel	Early Triassic	Kokarkuyu Formation	Turkey	An ostracod, a species of Reviya.	
Schramidontus	Gen. et sp. nov	Valid	Gueriau, Charbonnier & Clément	Late Devonian (Famennian)		Belgium	A member of Eucarida related to Angustidontus. The type species is Schramidontus labasensis.	
Scututergites	Gen. et sp. nov	Valid	Fraaije	Late Jurassic (late Kimmeridgian)		Germany	A hermit crab. The type species is Scututergites anteroindentatus.	
Semicytherura musacchioi	Sp. nov	Valid	Piovesan, Carbal & Colin in Piovesan et al.	Late Cretaceous (Santonian–Campanian)	Potiguar Basin	Brazil	A cytherurid ostracod, a species of Semicytherura.	
Sphaeroma montefallanoense	Sp. nov	Valid	Jones, Feldmann & Garassino	Jurassic	Monte Fallano Plattenkalk	Italy	An isopod, a species of Sphaeroma.	
Stagmacaris subcircularis	Sp. nov	Valid	Fraaije	Late Jurassic (late Kimmeridgian)		Germany	A hermit crab, a species of Stagmacaris.	
Stevea martini	Sp. nov	Valid	Feldmann, Schweitzer & Portell	Early Paleocene	Clayton Formation	United States	A member of Hexapodidae. Originally described as a species of Stevea, but subsequently transferred to the genus Alahexapus.	
Synurella aliciae	Sp. nov	Valid	Jażdżewski, Grabowski & Kupryjanowicz	Eocene		Probably Russia (Kaliningrad Oblast)	A member of Amphipoda found in Baltic amber, a species of Synurella.	
Tamnacythere	Gen. et sp. nov	Valid	Lee	Pliocene-Pleistocene	Seogwipo Formation	South Korea	An ostracod. The type species is Tamnacythere seogwipoensis.	
Tanycythere	Gen. et 6 sp. nov	Valid	Cabral et al.	Early Jurassic to Early Cretaceous (Hettangian to Barremian?)		Western and central Europe	An ostracod. Genus contains six species: T. caudata, T. praecaudata (with two subspecies: T. praecaudata praecaudata and T. praecaudata parallela), T. duartei, T. posteroelongata, T. wattonensis and T. procera.	
Tealliocaris walloniensis	Sp. nov	Valid	Gueriau, Charbonnier & Clément	Late Devonian (Famennian)		Belgium	A pygocephalomorph crustacean, a species of Tealliocaris.	
Telamonocarcinus antiquus	Sp. nov	Valid	Luque	Early Cretaceous (early Albian)		Colombia	A crab, a species of Telamonocarcinus.	
Tesseropora canariana	Sp. nov	Valid	Hornung	Pliocene (Zanclean)		Spain (Canary Islands)	A tetraclitid balanomorph barnacle, a species of Tesseropora.	
Tethyseryon	Gen. et sp. nov	Valid	Garassino, Audo, Charbonnier & Schweigert in Bravi et al.	Middle Jurassic (Bajocian/Bathonian)	Monte Fallano Plattenkalk	Italy	A member of Eryonidae. The type species is Tethyseryon campanicus.	
Theriosynoecum ballentae	Sp. nov	Valid	Ayress & Whatley	Early Cretaceous		South Atlantic Ocean (North Falkland Basin)	A non-marine ostracod, a species of Theriosynoecum.	
Theriosynoecum petasmathylacus	Sp. nov	Valid	Ayress & Whatley	Early Cretaceous		South Atlantic Ocean (North Falkland Basin)	A non-marine ostracod, a species of Theriosynoecum.	
Tianzhuestheria jianchangensis	Sp. nov	Valid	Wang	Middle–Late Jurassic		China	A clam shrimp.	
Timiriasevia fluitans	Sp. nov	Valid	Ayress & Whatley	Early Cretaceous		South Atlantic Ocean (North Falkland Basin)	A non-marine ostracod, a species of Timiriasevia.	
Triebelina anterotuberculata	Sp. nov	Valid	Piovesan, Carbal & Colin in Piovesan et al.	Late Cretaceous (Santonian–Campanian)	Potiguar Basin	Brazil	A bairdiid ostracod, a species of Triebelina.	
Triebelina obliquocostata	Sp. nov	Valid	Piovesan, Carbal & Colin in Piovesan et al.	Late Cretaceous (Santonian–Campanian)	Potiguar Basin	Brazil	A bairdiid ostracod, a species of Triebelina.	
Triglypta eedemtensis	Sp. nov	Valid	Li in Li et al.	Probably Middle Jurassic	Eedemt Formation	Mongolia	A clam shrimp, a species of Triglypta.	
Triglypta yabraiensis	Sp. nov	Valid	Wang			China	A clam shrimp.	
Ululapagurus	Gen. et sp. nov	Valid	Fraaije	Late Jurassic (late Kimmeridgian)		Germany	A hermit crab. The type species is Ululapagurus vanbakeli.	
Unzhiella navis	Sp. nov	Valid	Voronkova	Late Permian		Russia	A volganellid ostracod, a species of Unzhiella.	
Vecticypris samesi	Sp. nov	Valid	Ayress & Whatley	Early Cretaceous		South Atlantic Ocean (North Falkland Basin)	A non-marine ostracod, a species of Vecticypris.	
Verruca jagti	Sp. nov	Valid	Gale	Late Cretaceous (Maastrichtian)	Maastricht Formation	Netherlands	A barnacle, a species of Verruca.	
Volganella extensis	Sp. nov	Valid	Voronkova	Late Permian		Russia	A volganellid ostracod, a species of Volganella.	
Volganella golubevi	Sp. nov	Valid	Voronkova	Late Permian		Russia	A volganellid ostracod, a species of Volganella.	
Volganella vjaznikovensis	Sp. nov	Valid	Voronkova	Late Permian		Russia	A volganellid ostracod, a species of Volganella.	
Voulteryon	Gen. et sp. nov	Valid	Audo et al.	Middle Jurassic	La Voulte-sur-Rhône Lagerstätte	France	A member of Polychelida. The type species is Voulteryon parvulus.	
Wanestheria	Gen. et comb. nov	Valid	Chen & Shen	Late Cretaceous		China	A clam shrimp belonging to the family Sinoestheriidae. Genus includes "Sinoestheria" anhuiensis Chen & Shen (1982), "Sinoestheria" producta Chen & Shen (1982) and "Sinoestheria" semiorbita Chen & Shen (1982).	
Youngiverruca	Gen. et sp. nov	Valid	Gale	Late Cretaceous (Maastrichtian)		Germany	A barnacle. The type species is Youngiverruca ruegenensis.	
Zovocarcinus	Gen. et sp. nov	Valid	De Angeli & Garassino	Eocene (late Ypresian)		Italy	A member of Panopeidae. The type species is Zovocarcinus muelleri.	

== Trilobites ==
Name	Novelty	Status	Authors	Age	Unit	Location	Notes	Images
Airophrys	Gen. et sp. nov	Valid	Hughes & Thomas	Silurian		Greenland	A member of the family Proetidae. The type species is A. balia.	
Amphoton zangi	Sp. nov	Valid	Sun, Jago & Bentley	Cambrian (Drumian)	Warburton Basin	Australia	A polymerid trilobite, a species of Amphoton.	
Anataphrus kermiti	Sp. nov	Valid	Amati	Late Ordovician	Viola Springs Formation; Welling Formation	United States	An isoteline asaphid, a species of Anataphrus.	
Anataphrus megalophrys	Sp. nov	Valid	Amati	Late Ordovician	Viola Springs Formation	United States	An isoteline asaphid, a species of Anataphrus.	
Asaphellus nazarenensis	Sp. nov	Valid	Tortello & Esteban	Early Ordovician (Tremadocian)	Santa Rosita Formation	Argentina	A species of Asaphellus.	
Asthenopsis conandersoni	Sp. nov	Valid	Bentley & Jago	Cambrian		Australia		
Astroproetus franklini	Sp. nov	Valid	Hughes & Thomas	Silurian		Greenland	A member of the family Proetidae.	
Bathyurina curtisi	Sp. nov	Valid	Adrain, Karim & Westrop	Ordovician (Floian)	Fillmore Formation	United States	A bathyurid.	
Bathyurina hooki	Sp. nov	Valid	Adrain, Karim & Westrop	Ordovician (Floian)	Fillmore Formation	United States	A bathyurid.	
Bathyurina morrisi	Sp. nov	Valid	Adrain, Karim & Westrop	Ordovician (Floian)	Fillmore Formation	United States	A bathyurid.	
Bathyurina sumneri	Sp. nov	Valid	Adrain, Karim & Westrop	Ordovician (Floian)	Fillmore Formation	United States	A bathyurid.	
Bristolia colberti	Sp. nov	Valid	Gapp & Lieberman	Early Cambrian	Sekwi Formation	Canada	A member of Olenelloidea, a species of Bristolia.	
Cambrunicornia saxonica	Sp. nov	Valid	Geyer, Buschmann & Elicki	Middle Cambrian	Tröbitz Formation	Germany	A species of Cambrunicornia.	
Caudillaenus	Gen. et sp. nov	Valid	Rábano, Gutiérrez-Marco & García-Bellido	Ordovician (late Darriwilian)	Taddrist Formation	Morocco	An illaenid. The type species is Caudillaenus nicolasi.	
Chapmanopyge knudseni	Sp. nov	Valid	McCobb et al.	Early Ordovician		Greenland	A species of Chapmanopyge.	
Cheirurus falcatus	Sp. nov	Valid	Hughes & Thomas	Silurian		Greenland	A member of the family Cheiruridae.	
Cybantyx nebulosus	Sp. nov	Valid	Hughes & Thomas	Silurian		Greenland	A member of the family Scutelluidae.	
Cyphaspis heissae	Sp. nov	Valid	Van Viersen & Prescher	Middle Devonian	Ahbach Formation	Germany	An otarionine aulacopleurid, a species of Cyphaspis.	
Cyphaspis rommersheimensis	Sp. nov	Valid	Van Viersen & Prescher	Middle Devonian	Freilingen Formation	Germany	An otarionine aulacopleurid, a species of Cyphaspis.	
Cyphaspis walteri	Sp. nov	Valid	Van Viersen & Prescher	Middle Devonian	Bou Dib Formation	Morocco	An otarionine aulacopleurid, a species of Cyphaspis.	
Daketia	Gen. et sp. nov	Valid	Luo et al.	Ordovician (late Tremadocian-earliest Floian)	Tangchi Formation	China	A member of Asaphida. Genus includes new species D. spinata.	
Dalarnepeltis brevifrons	Sp. nov	Valid	Hughes & Thomas	Silurian		Greenland	A member of the family Tropidocoryphidae.	
Diacanthaspis krizi	Sp. nov	Valid	Mergl	Ordovician (late Katian)	Králův Dvůr Formation	Czech Republic	An odontopleurid, a species of Diacanthaspis.	
Dicranogmus pearyi	Sp. nov	Valid	Hughes & Thomas	Silurian		Greenland	A member of the family Lichidae.	
Dionide carlottae	Sp. nov	Valid	Corbacho, Morrison & Ait Addi	Ordovician (Katian)	Ktaoua Formation	Morocco	A member of Asaphida belonging to the family Dionididae, a species of Dionide.	
Dionidella venusta	Sp. nov	Valid	Zhou, Yin & Zhou	Ordovician		China		
Distyrax bibullatus	Sp. nov	Valid	Hughes & Thomas	Silurian		Greenland	A member of the family Encrinuridae.	
Dorypyge gidgealpaensis	Sp. nov	Valid	Sun, Jago & Bentley	Cambrian (Drumian)	Warburton Basin	Australia	A polymerid trilobite, a species of Dorypyge.	
Dulanaspis asper	Sp. nov	Valid	Zhou, Yin & Zhou	Ordovician		China		
Duyunaspis paiwuensis	Sp. nov	Valid	Lei & Peng	Cambrian	Balang Formation	China		
Ectenaspis burkhalteri	Sp. nov	Valid	Amati	Late Ordovician	Welling Formation	United States	An isoteline asaphid, a species of Ectenaspis.	
Ekwanoscutellum agmen	Sp. nov	Valid	Hughes & Thomas	Silurian		Greenland	A member of the family Scutelluidae.	
Elliptocephala jaredi	Sp. nov	Valid	Gapp & Lieberman	Early Cambrian	Sekwi Formation	Canada	A member of Olenelloidea, a species of Elliptocephala.	
Eoharpes yijianfangensis	Sp. nov	Valid	Zhou, Yin & Zhou	Ordovician		China		
Eokosovopeltis expansus	Sp. nov	Valid	Zhou, Yin & Zhou	Ordovician		China		
Erratojincella? decora	Sp. nov	Valid	Yuan & Li	Cambrian	Manto Formation	China	Possibly a species of Erratojincella.	
Ganetops	Gen. et comb. nov	Valid	Bignon, Corbacho & López-Soriano	Devonian (late Lochkovian)		Algeria; France; Germany; Spain	A member of Acastidae belonging to the subfamily Asteropyginae. A new genus for "Asteropyge" ebbae R. and E. Richter (1954); genus also contains "Treveropyge" djemelensis Morzadec (1997), "Treveropyge"? cf. ebbae Smeenk (1983), "Paracryphaeus" gerrinensis Timm (1978) and "Acastella" lata Timm (1978).	
Geragnostus (Novoagnostus) contractus	Sp. nov	Valid	Zhou, Yin & Zhou	Ordovician		China		
Holmiella domackae	Sp. nov	Valid	Gapp & Lieberman	Early Cambrian	Sekwi Formation	Canada	A member of Olenelloidea, a species of Holmiella.	
Holmiella taurus	Sp. nov	Valid	Gapp & Lieberman	Early Cambrian	Sekwi Formation	Canada	A member of Olenelloidea, a species of Holmiella.	
Hungioides yanjinensis	Sp. nov	Valid	Zhou et al.	Ordovician		China	A species of Hungioides.	
Hystricurus zanderi	Sp. nov	Valid	Adrain et al.	Ordovician (Tremadocian)		United States		
Illaenus cekovioides	Sp. nov	Valid	Zhou, Yin & Zhou	Ordovician		China		
Illaenus tianrongi	Sp. nov	Valid	Zhou, Yin & Zhou	Ordovician		China		
Illaenus usitatus	Sp. nov	Valid	Zhou, Yin & Zhou	Ordovician		China		
Iranoleesia (Proasaphiscina?) subconica	Sp. nov	Valid	Yuan & Li	Cambrian	Manto Formation	China	A species of Iranoleesia.	
Isotelus bradleyi	Sp. nov	Valid	Amati	Late Ordovician	Viola Springs Formation	United States	An isoteline asaphid, a species of Isotelus.	
Isotelus skapaneidos	Sp. nov	Valid	Amati	Late Ordovician	Viola Springs Formation; Welling Formation	United States	An isoteline asaphid, a species of Isotelus.	
Isotelus violaensis	Sp. nov	Valid	Amati	Late Ordovician	Viola Springs Formation	United States	An isoteline asaphid, a species of Isotelus.	
Jungosulcus	Gen. et 3 sp. nov	Valid	Hughes & Thomas	Silurian		Greenland	A member of the family Scutelluidae. The type species is J. emilyae; genus also includes new species J. anaphalantos and J. ventricosus.	
Kawina sinica	Sp. nov	Valid	Zhou, Yin & Zhou	Ordovician		China	A species of Kawina or Cydonocephalus.	
Kierarges	Gen. et sp. nov	Valid	Corbacho	Ordovician (Floian)	Fezouata Formation; Santa Justa Formation	Morocco; Portugal	A member of Asaphidae. The type species is Kierarges morrisoni.	
Lanceaspis	Gen. et sp. nov	Valid	Corbacho	Devonian (Pragian)	The Mader Platform	Morocco	A member of Acastidae. The type species is Lanceaspis hammondi.	
Laneia	Gen. et sp. nov	Valid	Hughes & Thomas	Silurian		Greenland	A member of the family Scutelluidae. The type species is L. enalios.	
Ligiscus diana	Sp. nov	Valid	Hughes & Thomas	Silurian		Greenland	A member of the family Scutelluidae.	
Liolalax naresi	Sp. nov	Valid	Hughes & Thomas	Silurian		Greenland	A member of the family Scutelluidae.	
Liostracina tangwangzhaiensis	Sp. nov	Valid	Park et al.	Middle Cambrian		China	A species of Liostracina.	
Lisania changi	Sp. nov	Valid	Sun, Jago & Bentley	Cambrian (Drumian)	Warburton Basin	Australia	A polymerid trilobite, a species of Lisania.	
Lochmanolenellus pentagonalis	Sp. nov	Valid	Mergl	Cambrian (early Dyeran)		North America	A species of Lochmanolenellus.	
Lochmanolenellus subquadratus	Sp. nov	Valid	Mergl	Cambrian (early Dyeran)		North America	A species of Lochmanolenellus.	
Lochmanolenellus trapezoidalis	Sp. nov	Valid	Mergl	Cambrian (early Dyeran)		North America	A species of Lochmanolenellus.	
Lyralichas qiaoi	Sp. nov	Valid	Zhou, Yin & Zhou	Ordovician		China		
Mesonacis wileyi	Sp. nov	Valid	Gapp & Lieberman	Early Cambrian	Sekwi Formation	Canada	A member of Olenelloidea, a species of Mesonacis.	
Minicryphaeus giganteus	Sp. nov	Valid	Bignon, Corbacho & López-Soriano	Devonian (Pragian)	Ihandar Formation	Morocco	A member of Acastidae belonging to the subfamily Asteropyginae, a species of Minicryphaeus.	
Mummaspis delgadoae	Sp. nov	Valid	Gapp & Lieberman	Early Cambrian	Sekwi Formation	Canada	A member of Olenelloidea, a species of Mummaspis.	
Nanillaenus crassus	Sp. nov	Valid	Zhou, Yin & Zhou	Ordovician		China		
Nileus amplus	Sp. nov	Valid	Zhou, Yin & Zhou	Ordovician		China		
Nileus australis	Sp. nov	Valid	Tortello & Esteban	Early Ordovician (Tremadocian)	Santa Rosita Formation	Argentina	A species of Nileus.	
Olenellus baileyi	Sp. nov	Valid	Gapp & Lieberman	Early Cambrian	Sekwi Formation	Canada	A member of Olenelloidea, a species of Olenellus.	
Olenoides sagittatus	Sp. nov	Valid	Geyer in Geyer et al.	Cambrian (Amgan)		Kyrgyzstan	A dorypygid corynexochidan, a species of Olenoides.	
Opoa limatula	Sp. nov	Valid	Hughes & Thomas	Silurian		Greenland	A member of the family Scutelluidae.	
Owensus	Gen. et sp. nov	Valid	Hughes & Thomas	Silurian		Greenland	A member of the family Proetidae. The type species is O. arktoperates.	
Parakoldinioidia akerfeldti	Sp. nov	Valid	Westrop & Adrain	Cambrian	Signal Mountain Formation	United States	A member of Missisquoiidae.	
Parakoldinioidia akessoni	Sp. nov	Valid	Westrop & Adrain	Cambrian	Signal Mountain Formation	United States	A member of Missisquoiidae.	
Parakoldinioidia lindgreni	Sp. nov	Valid	Westrop & Adrain	Cambrian	Signal Mountain Formation; Wilberns Formation	United States	A member of Missisquoiidae.	
Parakoldinioidia lopezi	Sp. nov	Valid	Westrop & Adrain	Cambrian	Signal Mountain Formation	United States	A member of Missisquoiidae.	
Parakoldinioidia mendezi	Sp. nov	Valid	Westrop & Adrain	Cambrian	Signal Mountain Formation	United States	A member of Missisquoiidae.	
Paraperaspis	Gen. et 2 sp. et comb. nov	Valid	Zhou, Yin & Zhou	Ordovician		China	A nileid. Genus includes new species P. angustus and P. dawangouensis, as well as "Nileus" convergens Lu (1975).	
Paraplethopeltis helli	Sp. nov	Valid	Adrain et al.	Ordovician (Tremadocian)		United States		
Parillaenus exiguus	Sp. nov	Valid	Zhou, Yin & Zhou	Ordovician		China		
Parillaenus vetus	Sp. nov	Valid	Zhou, Yin & Zhou	Ordovician		China		
Perryus mikulici	Sp. nov	Valid	Hughes & Thomas	Silurian		Greenland	A member of the family Encrinuridae.	
Profallotaspis tyusserica	Sp. nov	Valid	Bushuev & Goryaeva in Bushuev, Goryaeva & Pereladov	Cambrian	Tyusser Formation	Russia	A member of Fallotaspididae.	
Proetus confluens	Sp. nov	Valid	Hughes & Thomas	Silurian		Greenland	A member of the family Proetidae.	
Protolenus (Hupeolenus) bergstroemi	Sp. nov	Valid	Geyer, Buschmann & Elicki	Middle Cambrian	Tröbitz Formation	Germany	A species of Protolenus.	
Pseudinouyia shiliuyuanensis	Sp. nov	Valid	Yuan & Li	Cambrian	Manto Formation	China	A species of Pseudinouyia.	
Pseudoclelandia weymouthae	Sp. nov	Valid	Adrain et al.	Ordovician (Tremadocian)		United States		
Pseudohystricurus wigglesorum	Sp. nov	Valid	Adrain, Karim & Westrop	Ordovician	Garden City Formation	United States	A dimeropygid trilobite.	
Ptychobaba	Gen. et comb. nov	Valid	Pratt & Bordonaro	Cambrian	La Laja Formation; Rome Formation	Argentina; United States	A new genus for "Ptychoparella" buttsi Resser (1938).	
Punka adamsi	Sp. nov	Valid	McCobb et al.	Early Ordovician		Greenland	A species of Punka.	
Radiurus pauli	Sp. nov	Valid	Hughes & Thomas	Silurian		Greenland	A member of the family Cheiruridae.	
Raragnostus shergoldi	Sp. nov	Valid	Sun, Jago & Bentley	Cambrian (Drumian)	Warburton Basin	Australia	An agnostoid trilobite, a species of Raragnostus.	
Rossaspis leboni	Sp. nov	Valid	Adrain et al.	Ordovician (Tremadocian)		United States		
Sagavia laxa	Sp. nov	Valid	Zhou, Yin & Zhou	Ordovician		China		
Sestrostega cylindrica	Sp. nov	Valid	Yuan & Li	Cambrian	Manto Formation	China	A species of Sestrostega.	
Shanxiella (Shanxiella) latilimbata	Sp. nov	Valid	Yuan & Li	Cambrian	Manto Formation	China	A species of Shanxiella.	
Solenoparia gatehousei	Sp. nov	Valid	Sun, Jago & Bentley	Cambrian (Drumian)	Warburton Basin	Australia	A polymerid trilobite, a species of Solenoparia.	
Stegnopsis erythragora	Sp. nov	Valid	Amati	Late Ordovician	Viola Springs Formation; Welling Formation	United States	An isoteline asaphid, a species of Stegnopsis.	
Stegnopsis wellingensis	Sp. nov	Valid	Amati	Late Ordovician	Welling Formation	United States	An isoteline asaphid, a species of Stegnopsis.	
Stenopareia persica	Sp. nov	Valid	Hughes & Thomas	Silurian		Greenland	A member of the family Illaenidae.	
Struveaspis bignoni	Sp. nov	Valid	Corbacho	Devonian (Eifelian)		Morocco	A member of Phacopidae, a species of Struveaspis.	
Tairongia	Gen. et sp. et comb. nov	Valid	Zhou, Yin & Zhou	Ordovician		China	A lichid. Genus includes new species T. bachuensis, as well as "Lichas" browni Sun (1931).	
Trinodus jii	Nom. nov		Zhou, Yin & Zhou	Ordovician		China	A replacement name for Trinodus latilimbatus Ji (1986).	
Winiskia eruga	Sp. nov	Valid	Hughes & Thomas	Silurian		Greenland	A member of the family Proetidae.	
Winiskia leptomedia	Sp. nov	Valid	Hughes & Thomas	Silurian		Greenland	A member of the family Proetidae.	
Winiskia stickta	Sp. nov	Valid	Hughes & Thomas	Silurian		Greenland	A member of the family Proetidae.	

== Other arthropods ==
Name	Novelty	Status	Authors	Age	Unit	Location	Notes	Images
Anbarrhacus	Gen. et sp. nov	Valid	Riquelme & Hernández in Riquelme et al.	Early or middle Miocene		Mexico	A platyrhacid polydesmidan millipede. The type species is Anbarrhacus adamantis.	Anbarrhacus adamantis
Annge	Gen. et sp. nov	Valid	Smith et al.	Cambrian (Templetonian)	Giles Creek Dolostone	Australia	A member of Bradoriida. Genus includes new species A. iperte.	
Cambrolongispina	Gen. et 2 sp. nov	Valid	Zhang, Dong & Xiao	Cambrian (Drumian)		China	A bivalved arthropod of uncertain phylogenetic placement. Genus contains two species: Cambrolongispina reticulata and Cambrolongispina glabra.	
Erjiecaris	Gen. et sp. nov	Valid	Fu, Zhang & Budd	Early Cambrian	Chengjiang Lagerstätte	China	An early bivalved arthropod of uncertain phylogenetic placement. The type species is Erjiecaris minusculo.	
Falcatamacaris	Gen. et sp. nov	Valid	Ortega-Hernández et al.	Cambrian (Guzhangian)	Weeks Formation	United States	An artiopodan arthropod. The type species is Falcatamacaris bellua.	
Flemingopsis anteriospinata	Sp. nov	Valid	Smith et al.	Cambrian (Templetonian)	Giles Creek Dolostone	Australia	A member of Bradoriida.	
Haifengella	Gen. et sp. nov	Valid	Zhao et al.	Early Cambrian	Chengjiang Lagerstätte	China	An arthropod related to Helmetia. The type species is Haifengella corona.	
Jiucunella phaseloa	Sp. nov	Valid	Betts et al.	Early Cambrian		Australia	A member of Bradoriida, a species of Jiucunella.	
Jixinlingella daimonikoa	Sp. nov	Valid	Betts et al.	Early Cambrian		Australia	A member of Bradoriida, a species of Jixinlingella.	
Limulus darwini	Sp. nov	Valid	Kin & Błażejowski	Late Jurassic (late Tithonian)	Kcynia Formation	Poland	A horseshoe crab. Originally described as a species of Limulus; Bicknell et al. (2021) transferred this species to the genus Crenatolimulus.	
Maatidesmus	Gen. et sp. nov	Valid	Riquelme & Hernández in Riquelme et al.	Early or middle Miocene (c. 23–15 Mya)	Mexican amber	Mexico	A chelodesmid polydesmidan millipede. The type species is M. paachtun.	Maatidesmus paachtun
Monasterium ferox	Sp. nov	Valid	Smith et al.	Cambrian (Templetonian)	Giles Creek Dolostone	Australia	A member of Bradoriida.	
Mongolitubulus anthelios	Sp. nov	Valid	Betts et al.	Early Cambrian		Australia	A member of Bradoriida, a species of Mongolitubulus.	
Mongolitubulus tunpere	Sp. nov	Valid	Smith et al.	Cambrian (Templetonian)	Giles Creek Dolostone	Australia	A member of Bradoriida.	
Neokunmingella moroensis	Sp. nov	Valid	Betts et al.	Early Cambrian		Australia	A member of Bradoriida, a species of Neokunmingella.	
Polzia	Gen. et sp. nov	Valid	Hegna, Vega & González-Rodríguez	Cretaceous (Albian to Cenomanian)	El Doctor Formation	Mexico	A member of Thylacocephala (a group of arthropods of uncertain phylogenetic placement, possibly crustaceans). The type species is Polzia eldoctorensis.	
Sinskolutella cuspidata	Sp. nov	Valid	Betts et al.	Early Cambrian		Australia	A member of Bradoriida, a species of Sinskolutella.	
Thylacares	Gen. et sp. nov	Valid	Haug et al.	Silurian (late Telychian)	Brandon Bridge Formation	United States	A member of Thylacocephala (a group of arthropods of uncertain phylogenetic placement, possibly crustaceans). The type species is Thylacares brandonensis.	
Victoriacaris	Gen. et sp. nov	Valid	Hegna, Vega & González-Rodríguez	Cretaceous (Albian to Cenomanian)	El Doctor Formation	Mexico	A member of Thylacocephala (a group of arthropods of uncertain phylogenetic placement, possibly crustaceans. The type species is Victoriacaris muhiensis.	
