= Monte Fallano Plattenkalk =

Geological formation in Italy

- Stratigraphic range: Bajocian-Bathonian ~171–165 Ma
- Type: Geological formation
- Unit of: Apennine carbonate platform
- Thickness: 3.5 m (11 ft) (exposed)

Lithology
- Primary: Fine and thinly laminated limestones

Location
- Coordinates: 41°11′04″N 14°16′26″E
- Region: Campania
- Country: Italy
- Extent: Monte Fallano area

Type section
- Named for: Monte Fallano
- Named by: Bravi & Casertano
- Year defined: 1999
- Monte Fallano Plattenkalk (Italy)

The Monte Fallano Plattenkalk (Also known as Calcari Oolitici et Oncolitici) is a geological formation in Italy, dating to roughly between 171 and 165 million years ago, and covering the Bajocian-Bathonian stages of the Middle Jurassic Period in southern Italy. It represents a Fossillagerstätte preserving a diverse assemblage of fossils.

== Description ==
The Monte Fallano Plattenkalk was first reported in 1999. It consists of fine-grained, thinly laminated limestone typical of Plattenkalk deposits, exposed in a 3.5-meter-thick section. The formation is part of the Apennine carbonate platform succession, which accumulated in shallow marine environments during the Jurassic.

The lithology reflects deposition in shallow water carbonate platform settings, with sedimentological features indicating calm conditions suitable for the preservation of delicate fossils. Biostratigraphic analyses, based on molluscs and other fossils such as Foraminifera, confirm a Middle Jurassic age, specifically spanning the Bajocian to Bathonian stages. A post Lower Bajocian flooding if the region supports more this age assignation.

== Depositional environment ==
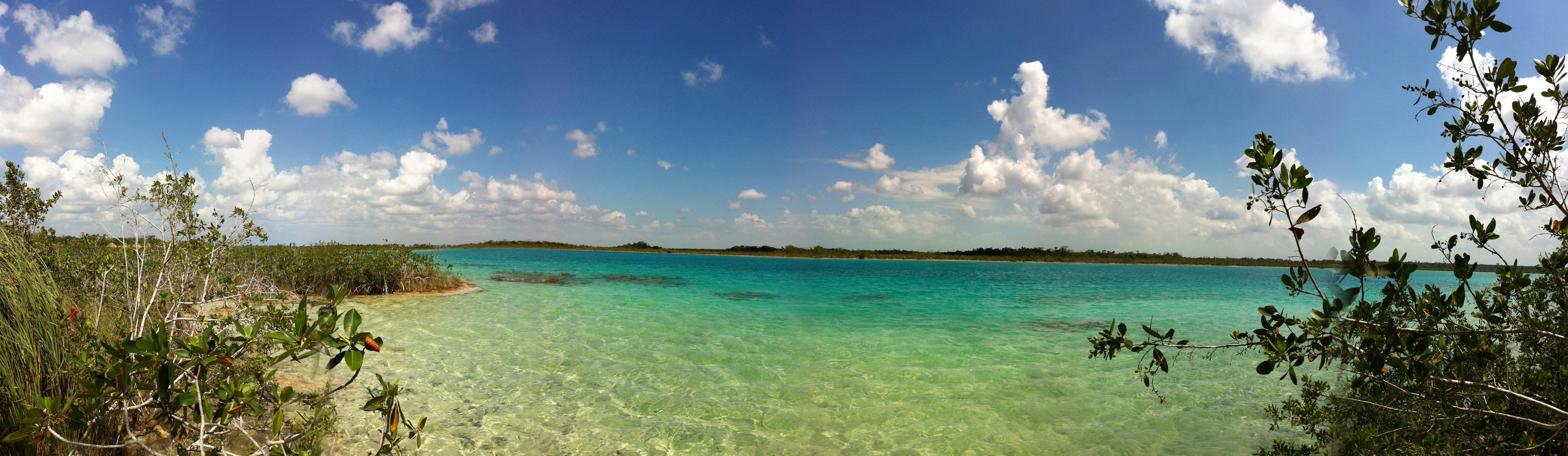
Modern Environment equivalent, Bacalar Lagoon

The depositional environment of the Monte Fallano Plattenkalk is interpreted as a shallow Carbonate platform, likely in a protected lagoonal or restricted marine setting. The fine lamination and excellent fossil preservation suggest low-energy conditions with minimal disturbance, allowing for the accumulation of organic remains from both marine and nearby terrestrial sources. Taphonomic evidence from plant fossils indicates parautochthonous deposition, with material transported short distances from adjacent land areas. The presence of both juvenile and adult decapod crustaceans supports the idea that some species were native to this environment.

Due to the low thickness, this formation records a stable biotope, as the floral composition shows little variation throughout the section. Sedimentological data, combined with the characteristics of the decapod crustaceans and fishes, point to depositional processes in shallow marine waters, possibly influenced by nearby emergent lands contributing terrigenous material.

== Biota ==
=== Foranimifera ===
Taxa	Species	Material	Notes
Mesoendothyra	croatica	Tests	Mesoendothyridae.
Nautiloculina	oolithica	Tests	Nautiloculinidae.
Pfenderella	arabica	Tests	Pfenderininae.
Protopeneroplis	striata	Tests	Ventrolaminidae
Pseudocyclammina	sp.	Tests	Hauraniidae.
Siphovalvulina	sp.	Tests	Pseudopfenderininae.
Spiroloculina	sp.	Tests	Spiroloculinidae.
Trocholina	sp.	Tests	Involutinidae.
Valvulina	lugeoni	Tests	Valvulinidae.

=== Invertebrates ===
Taxa	Species	Material	Notes	Images
Acanthochirana	liburiaensis	Specimens	Aegeridae	Specimen from Germany
Archaeoniscus	italiensis	Specimens	Sphaeromatidea	Reconstruction of a Korean specimen
Casertanus	sabellicus	Specimens	Sergestidae	
Eryma	osciensis	Specimens	Erymidae	
Favreina	isp.	Coprolites	Decapod Coprolites (Axiidea?)	
Niveotanais	brunnensis	Specimens	Tanaidacea	
Palaega	furcillanatis	Specimens	Cirolanidae	
Sphaeroma	montefallanoense	Specimens	Sphaeromatidae	Extant specimen
Tethyseryon	campanicus	Specimens	Eryonidae	

=== Vertebrates ===
Indeterminate material includes primitive teleosts and indeterminate "ganoid" fishes.

Taxa	Species	Material	Notes	Images
Leptolepis	spp.	Specimens	Leptolepidae	Specimen from Germany
Notagogus	(Neonotagogus) denticulatus	Specimens	Macrosemiidae	restoration of Notagogus
Pleuropholis	sp.	Specimens	Pleuropholidae	Specimen from Germany
Pycnodontidae indet.	Indeterminate	Complete Specimen	Pycnodontid fish	

=== Flora ===
Unidentified flora includes Leaves with parallel venation; long wide and long narrow parallel veined leaves or leaflets, axes & wood fragments.

Taxa	Species	Material	Notes	Images
Araucarites	sp.	Woody scales of conifer	Araucariaceae	Specimen from another Italian location
Brachyphyllum	sp.	branched and unbranched leafy shoots	Araucariaceae or Hirmeriellaceae	Specimen from another Italian location
Cayeuxia		Imprints	Cyanobacteria	
Cupressinocladus	sp.	Twigs with decussate leaves	Araucariaceae, Hirmeriellaceae or Cupressaceae	
Sellinoporella	donzellii	Imprints	Dasycladaceae	
Thaumatoporella	parvovesiculifera	Imprints	Thaumatoporellales	
