= Palicus gracilis =

Scientific classification
- Domain: Eukaryota
- Kingdom: Animalia
- Phylum: Arthropoda
- Class: Malacostraca
- Order: Decapoda
- Suborder: Pleocyemata
- Infraorder: Brachyura
- Family: Palicidae
- Genus: Palicus
- Species: P. gracilis

Binomial name
- Palicus gracilis Smith, 1883

Species of crab

Palicus gracilis is a species of stilt crab. It inhabits the floor of the eastern Atlantic Ocean.

== Description ==
The shell and margins are convex. Anterolaterals are oblique, with a wide orbital margin. P. gracilis has two pairs of anterolateral teeth, with the outer pair being shorter that the teeth of the inner pair. There is a shallow suture between the outer and the inner pair of anterolaterals. The second pair of ambulatory legs is almost 3.5 times longer than the width of the carapace. The suborbital margin is triangular. The carpi are cylindrical, not flattened or angled.

Maximum carapace width is 16 mm and length is 10.6 mm.

== Distribution ==
It has been found in dredges of the ocean floor from Massachusetts to the Caribbean coast of Colombia, as well as in the Gulf of Mexico. It has been found at depths down to 180–504 m (591–1,654 ft).
