= Miliolana =

Miliolana Temporal range: Mississippian - Recent

Scientific classification
- Domain: Eukaryota
- Clade: Sar
- Clade: Rhizaria
- Phylum: Retaria
- Subphylum: Foraminifera
- Class: Miliolata
- Subclass: Miliolana; Saidova, 1981

Orders
- Cornuspirida; Miliolida; Soritida

Subclass of single-celled organisms

Miliolana is a subclass established by Saidova, 1981 that comprises porcelaneous members of the Miliolata from the Cornuspirida, Miliolida with agglutinated forms removed to the Miliamminana, and Soritida. Included are both free and attached forms, some coiled with two chambers per whorl arranged in different planes, others that are irregular or have serial chambers, and still others are fusiform with complex interiors, superficially resembling the Fusulinoidea. The unifying character is their imperforate porcelaneous tests.
