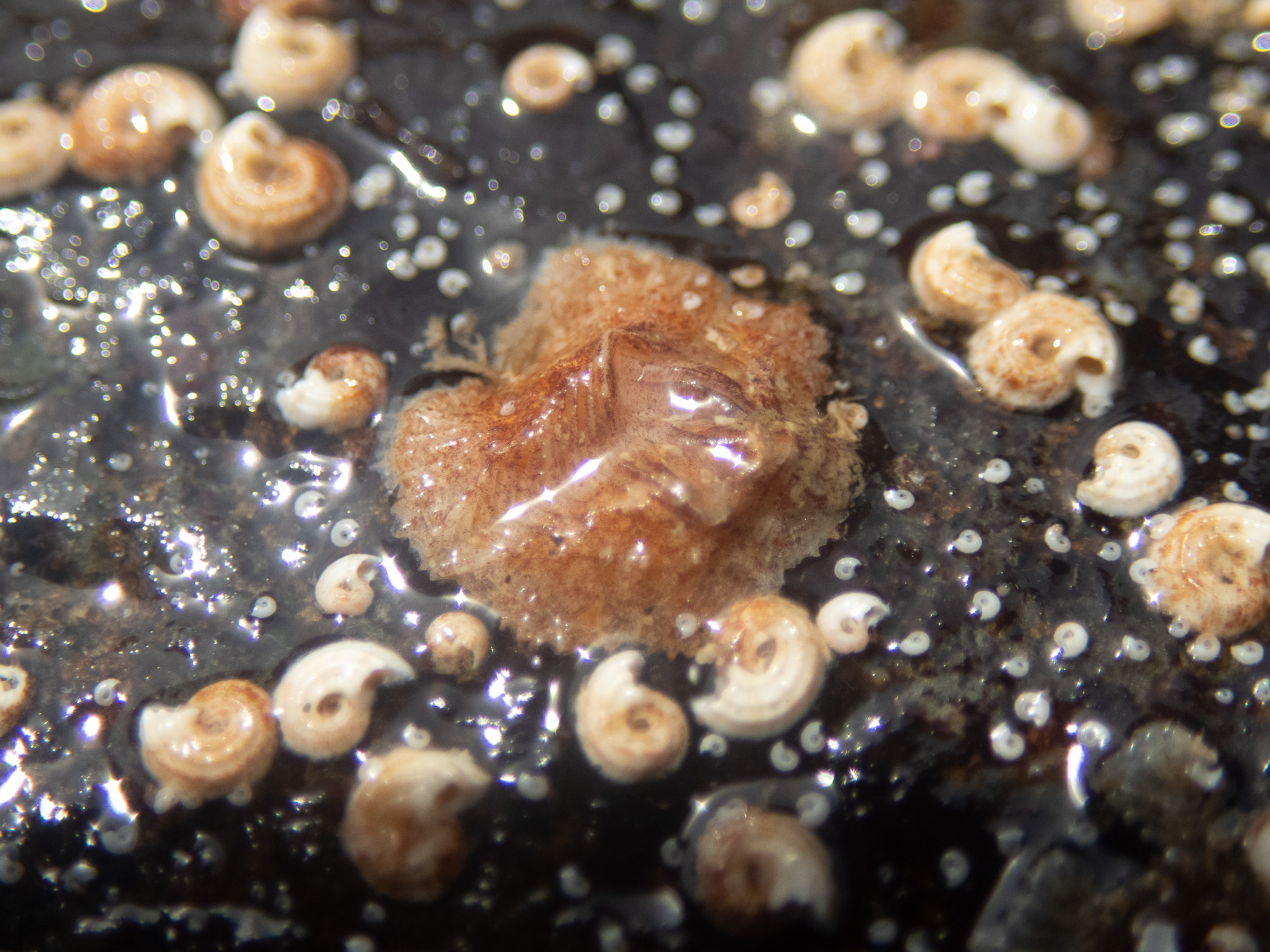
- Verruca stroemia

Scientific classification
- Kingdom: Animalia
- Phylum: Arthropoda
- Class: Thecostraca
- Subclass: Cirripedia
- Order: Verrucomorpha
- Family: Verrucidae
- Genus: Verruca
- Species: V. stroemia

Binomial name
- Verruca stroemia (O.F. Müller, 1776)

= Verruca stroemia =

Species of barnacle

Verruca stroemia, the wart barnacle, is a species of asymmetrical sessile barnacle in the family Verrucidae.
