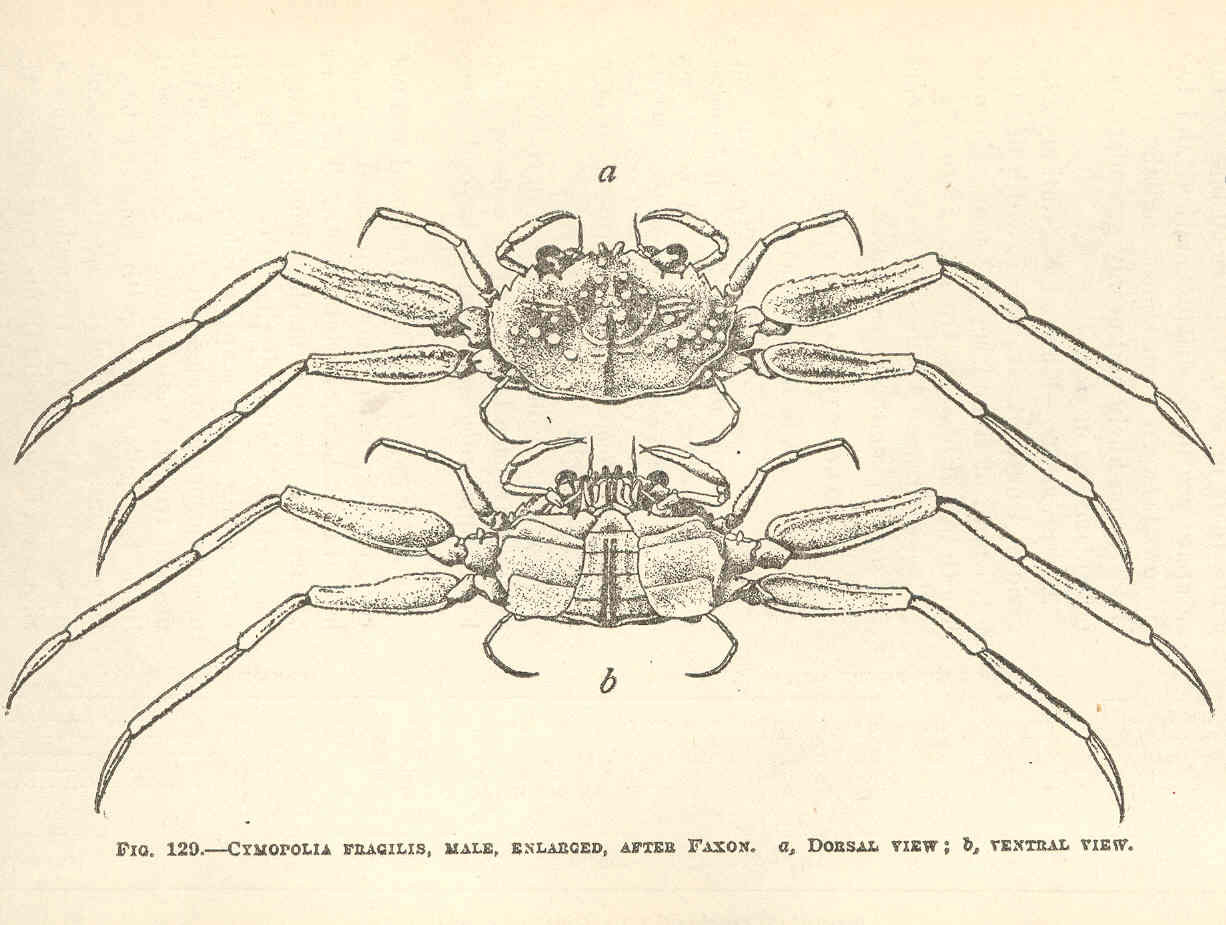
- Palicus fragilis

Scientific classification
- Kingdom: Animalia
- Phylum: Arthropoda
- Clade: Pancrustacea
- Class: Malacostraca
- Order: Decapoda
- Suborder: Pleocyemata
- Infraorder: Brachyura
- Subsection: Heterotremata
- Superfamily: Palicoidea; Bouvier, 1898

Families
- Crossotonotidae; Palicidae

= Palicoidea =

Superfamily of crabs

Palicoidea is a superfamily of crabs, comprising the two families Crossotonotidae and Palicidae. Together, they contain 13 genera, including two genera in the Palicidae known only from fossils. The two families were previously treated as two subfamilies in a Palicidae of wider circumscription.

Family Crossotonotidae Moosa & Serène, 1981

- Crossotonotus A. Milne-Edwards, 1873
- †Montemagrellus De Angeli & Ceccon, 2014
- Pleurophricus A. Milne-Edwards, 1873

Family Palicidae Bouvier, 1898

- †Eopalicus Beschin, Busulini, De Angeli & Tessier, 1996
- Exopalicus Castro, 2000
- Miropalicus Castro, 2000
- Neopalicus Moosa & Serène, 1981
- Palicoides Moosa & Serène, 1981
- Paliculus Castro, 2000
- Palicus Philippi, 1838
- Parapalicus Moosa & Serène, 1981
- Pseudopalicus Moosa & Serène, 1981
- Rectopalicus Castro, 2000
- †Spinipalicus Beschin & De Angeli, 2003
