= Ventrolaminidae =

Ventrolaminidae Temporal range: Bajocian – Berriasian

Scientific classification
- Domain: Eukaryota
- Clade: Sar
- Clade: Rhizaria
- Phylum: Retaria
- Subphylum: Foraminifera
- Class: Tubothalamea
- Order: †Involutinida
- Family: †Ventrolaminidae; Weynschenk, 1950

Family of single-celled organisms

The Ventrolaminidae are a family of benthic Foraminifera included in the Involutinida, now part of the subclass Spirillinana, class Spirillinata.

Tests of the Ventrolaminidae are lenticular, planispiral, or a low trochospiral with multiple chambers in a rapidly enlarging whorl. The wall is calcareous in two layers. The inner one is microgranular, the outer hyaline glassy).

Two genera are included, Archaeosepta and Protopeneroplis. Loeblich and Tappan included Protopeneroplis (or Ventrolamina, in the Involutinidae in the Treatise Part C, 1964. Archaeosepta was added hence, in 1970.
