= Miocyprideis mozarti =

Scientific classification
- Kingdom: Animalia
- Phylum: Arthropoda
- Clade: Pancrustacea
- Class: Ostracoda
- Order: Podocopida
- Family: Cytherideidae
- Genus: Miocyprideis
- Species: M. mozarti

Binomial name
- Miocyprideis mozarti (Bonaduce, Masoli & Pugliese, 1978)

Synonyms
- Bishopina mozarti Bonaduce, Masoli & Pugliese, 1976

Species of crustacean

Miocyprideis mozarti is a species of ostracod named for Wolfgang Amadeus Mozart.

== See also ==
- List of organisms named after famous people
