= Miliamminana =

Miliamminana Temporal range: Cretaceous - Recent

Scientific classification
- Domain: Eukaryota
- Clade: Sar
- Clade: Rhizaria
- Phylum: Retaria
- Subphylum: Foraminifera
- Class: Miliolata
- Subclass: Miliamminana; Mikhalevich, 1980

Subclass of amoeboid protists

Miliamminana is a subclass of miliolates established by Mikhalevich, 1980 that combines two groups of foraminifers with agglutinated tests. They are the Rzehakinidae which previously were included in the Texulariina in the Treatise on Invertebrate Paleontology although milioline in form, and the milioline Schlumbergerinida which includes genera removed from the Miliolina. The rzehakinids are composed of finely agglutinated material, insoluble in acid, over an organic base. Schlumbergerinids are composed of acid soluble agglutinated material over a porcelenous base. The unifying character is the nature of their coiling in which there are two tubular chambers, or sections, per whorl arranged in various planes and the fact that they are in part all agglutinated.
