= Miliolata =

Miliolata Temporal range: Mississippian - Recent

Scientific classification
- Domain: Eukaryota
- Supergroup: Rhizaria
- Phylum: Foraminifera
- Class: Miliolata; Saidova 1981

Subclass
- Miliamminana; Miliolana

Class of single-celled organisms

Miliollata is a class wherein Foraminifera is regarded as a phylum that unites the porcelaneous Miliolida, (subclass Miliolana Saidova, 1981) and siliceous Rzehakinidae (subclass Miliamminana Mikhalevich, 1980) based on similarities of their tests. Previously the Rzehakinidae were included in the Textulariina (Loeblich and Tappan, 1964) based on test wall composition rather than test form. The meaning of Miliolida is retained.

The Miliolana are variable in form. All are porcelaneous and imperforate, some incorporating foreign material; some are attached, others free. Includes the Miliolidae which have two tubular chambers per whorl, the multichambered Soritidae and the mostly prolate Alveolinidae. The Rzehakinidae (Miliamminana) resemble the Miliolidae in overall form but differ in composition.
