= Involutinida =

Involutinida Temporal range: Early Permian- Cenomanian

Scientific classification
- Domain: Eukaryota
- Clade: Sar
- Clade: Rhizaria
- Phylum: Retaria
- Subphylum: Foraminifera
- Class: Tubothalamea
- Order: †Involutinida; Hohenegger and Piller, 1977

Families
- Hirsutospirellidae; Involutinidae; Planispirillinidae; Ventrolaminidae

Order of amoeboid protists

Involutinida is an order of foraminifera included in the Spirillinata found in the fossil record from the early Permian to early Late Cretaceous (Cenomanian).

== Diagnosis ==
The Involutinida are characterized by a two chambered aragonitic test consisting of an initial spheroidal chamber, or proloculus, enclosed by a tubular second, or main chamber. The test wall may be bilamellar (two layered), the inner layer being microgranular and often dark, the outer hyaline (clear, glassy). Coiling may be planispiral or trochospiral, forming a cone. Lamellar thickenings or pillar-like structures may be found in the umbilical region on one or both sides.

== Taxonomy ==
Four families are included in Involutinida, three of which, the Involutinidae, Hirsutospirellidae, and Planispirillinidae all have undivided tubular second chambers. The fourth, the Ventrolaminidae has numerous chambers following the proloculus. All four are represented by planispiral or trochospiral forms.

== History ==
The concept of the Involutinida has developed over the years, beginning with the Involutinidae as described in the Treatise Part C, 1964, which then was included in the Cassidulinacea. The Involutinidae were expanded into the superfamily Involutinacea, named by Zaninetti, 1975, so accommodating additional families. Later, Hohenegger and Piller, 1977, the Involutinacea was redefined as the suborder Involutinina, now the Involutinida.
