= Planispirillinidae =

Scientific classification
- Domain: Eukaryota
- Clade: Sar
- Clade: Rhizaria
- Phylum: Retaria
- Subphylum: Foraminifera
- Class: Tubothalamea
- Order: †Involutinida
- Family: †Planispirillinidae; Piller, 1978

Genera
- Alanwoodia; Conicospirillinoides; Planispirillina; Trocholinopsis

Family of single-celled organisms

The Planispirillinidae are a family of living Foraminifera and the only one of the Involutinida now living.

The included genera are characterized by asymmetrical, semi-involute to partially evolute, aragonitic tests consisting of an undivided planispiral or trochospiral tubular chamber wound about the proloculus, or initial chamber. The umbilical region on one or both sides is filled with lamellae. The aperture is a simple opening and the end of the tube.

The genera Alanwoodia and Planispirillina are included in the Spirillinidae in the Treatise on Invertebrate Paleontology, Part C, 1964. The other two were added subsequent to publication.
