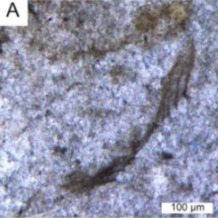
- Hirsutospirella pilosa

Scientific classification
- Domain: Eukaryota
- Clade: Sar
- Clade: Rhizaria
- Phylum: Retaria
- Subphylum: Foraminifera
- Class: Tubothalamea
- Order: †Involutinida
- Family: †Hirsutospirellidae; Zaninetti, et al 1985

= Hirsutospirellidae =

Hirsutospirellidae Temporal range: Late Triassic (Norian)

Family of single-celled organisms

The Hirsutospirellidae, established for the Late Triassic genus Hirsutospirella, are a family of Foraminifera within the Involutinida that produced calcareous tests with a proloculus followed by an undivided trochospirally enrolled tubular second chamber, in which the spiral side has prominent spinelike protrusions and umbilical side has a shallow umbilical filling.
