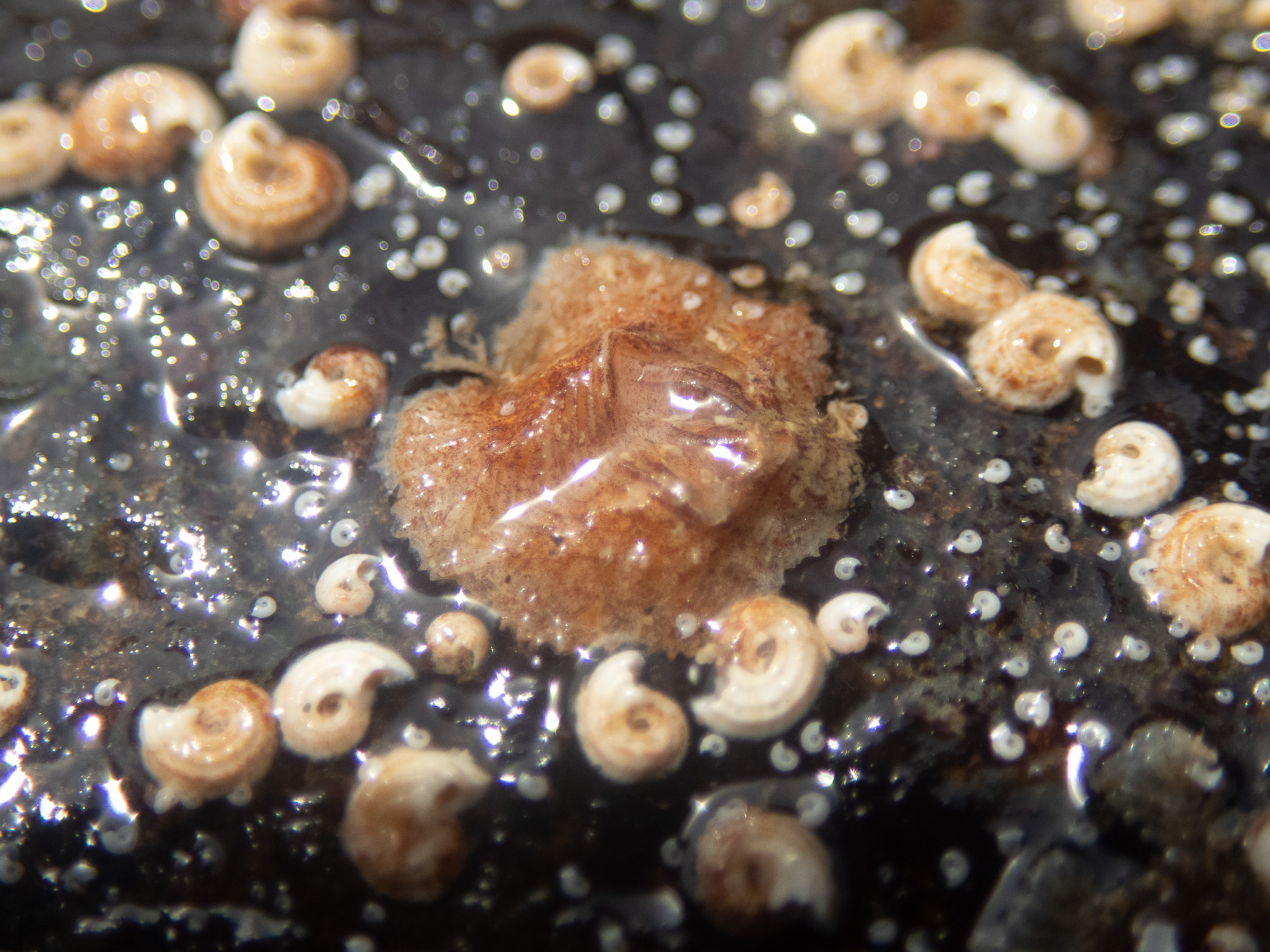
- Verruca stroemia

Scientific classification
- Kingdom: Animalia
- Phylum: Arthropoda
- Class: Thecostraca
- Subclass: Cirripedia
- Order: Verrucomorpha
- Family: Verrucidae; Darwin, 1854

= Verrucidae =

Family of crustaceans

Verrucidae is a family of asymmetrical sessile barnacles in the order Verrucomorpha. There are about 14 genera and more than 90 described species in Verrucidae.

== Genera ==
These genera belong to the family Verrucidae:

- Altiverruca Pilsbry, 1916
- Brochiverruca Zevina, 1993
- Cameraverruca Pilsbry, 1916
- Costatoverruca Young, 1998
- Cristallinaverruca Young, 2002
- Gibbosaverruca Young, 2002
- Globuloverruca Young, 2004
- Metaverruca Pilsbry, 1916
- Newmaniverruca Young, 1998
- Rostratoverruca Broch, 1922
- Spongoverruca Zevina, 1987
- Verruca Schumacher, 1817
- † Priscoverruca Gale, 2014
- † Youngiverruca Gale, 2014
