= Spirillinata =

Spirillinata Temporal range: Cambrian - recent

Scientific classification
- Domain: Eukaryota
- Clade: Sar
- Clade: Rhizaria
- Phylum: Retaria
- Subphylum: Foraminifera
- Class: Miliolata
- Subclass: Spirillinata; Maslakova, 1990

Subclass
- Ammodiscana; Spirillinata

Class of single-celled organisms

The Spirillinata are a group of Foraminifera established by Maslakova, 1990, for spirally wound forms, where the Foraminifera are regarded as a phylum. Two subclasses are included, the agglutinated Ammodiscana and the calcareous Spirillinana.

Tests of the Spirillinata consist typically of a proloculus followed by an undivided planospirally or trochospirally wound tubular chamber such that the test is either planar or conical. Some however are pseudochambered as the result of constrictions of the test wall or by short septula (incomplete septa). The two orders are distinguished by their composition. The Ammodiscana are composed of fine agglutinated matter. The Spirillinana, in the original sense, are composed of an optically single crystal of calcite. Genera added from the Involutinida are of aragonite.
