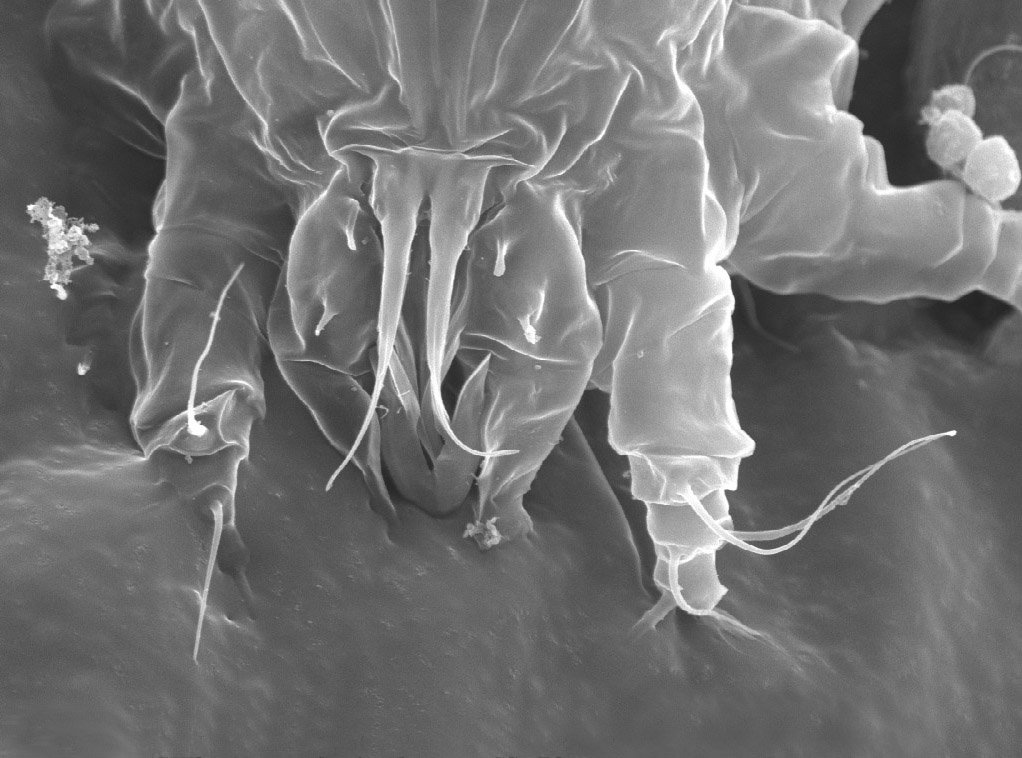
- Electron micrograph of Floracarus perrepae attacking a plant

Scientific classification
- Kingdom: Animalia
- Phylum: Arthropoda
- Subphylum: Chelicerata
- Class: Arachnida
- Superorder: Acariformes
- Superfamily: Eriophyoidea; Nalepa, 1898

= Eriophyoidea =

Eriophyoidea Temporal range: Carnian to Present

Superfamily of mites

Eriophyoidea are a superfamily of herbivorous mites. All post-embryonic instars lack the third and fourth pairs of legs, and the respiratory system is also absent.

The taxonomy of this group has always been confused. There were families created for few or even one species, i.e. Ashieldophyidae Mohanasundaram, 1984 and Pentasetacidae Shevchenko, 1991 but these families were placed by J. W. Amrine and T. A. Stasny within larger groups. Today the following three families are believed to belong to superfamily Eriophyoidea:

- Eriophyidae Nalepa, 1898
- Phytoptidae Murray, 1877
- Diptilomiopidae Keifer, 1944

== Description ==
Eriophyoids are no more than 0.5 mm long and usually 0.12 mm long or less. The body shape is usually long and wormlike (vermiform), but it can rarely be flattened or lobulate. At the front end of the body are the mouthparts, a pair of minute palps and two pairs of legs. The posterior part of the body is annulate, meaning it is covered in rings (annuli). The body and legs have some setae but fewer than in other mites (i.e. setation is reduced). In terms of colour, eriophyoids are white to yellowish.

Females have a genital flap posterior to the coxae of the second pair of legs, and they lack genital papillae. Males have reduced genital flaps.

In some species, adult females have two different forms, the protogyne and the deutogyne. Deutogynes normally resemble protogynes, but they can also show differences such as red colouration, different microtubercle structure, broader prodorsal shield, larger body size and dorsal annuli being more sclerotised. This may cause protogynes and deutogynes to be mistaken for different species.

== Reproduction ==
Eriophyoidea reproduce through both internal fertilisation and arrhenotoky (i.e. females producing male offspring without being fertilised). Fertilisation involves males depositing stalked spermatophores on a plant. Females capture spermatophores, crush them to extract the sperm and store this in spermathecae.

Female eriophyoids lay spherical eggs.

== Ecology ==
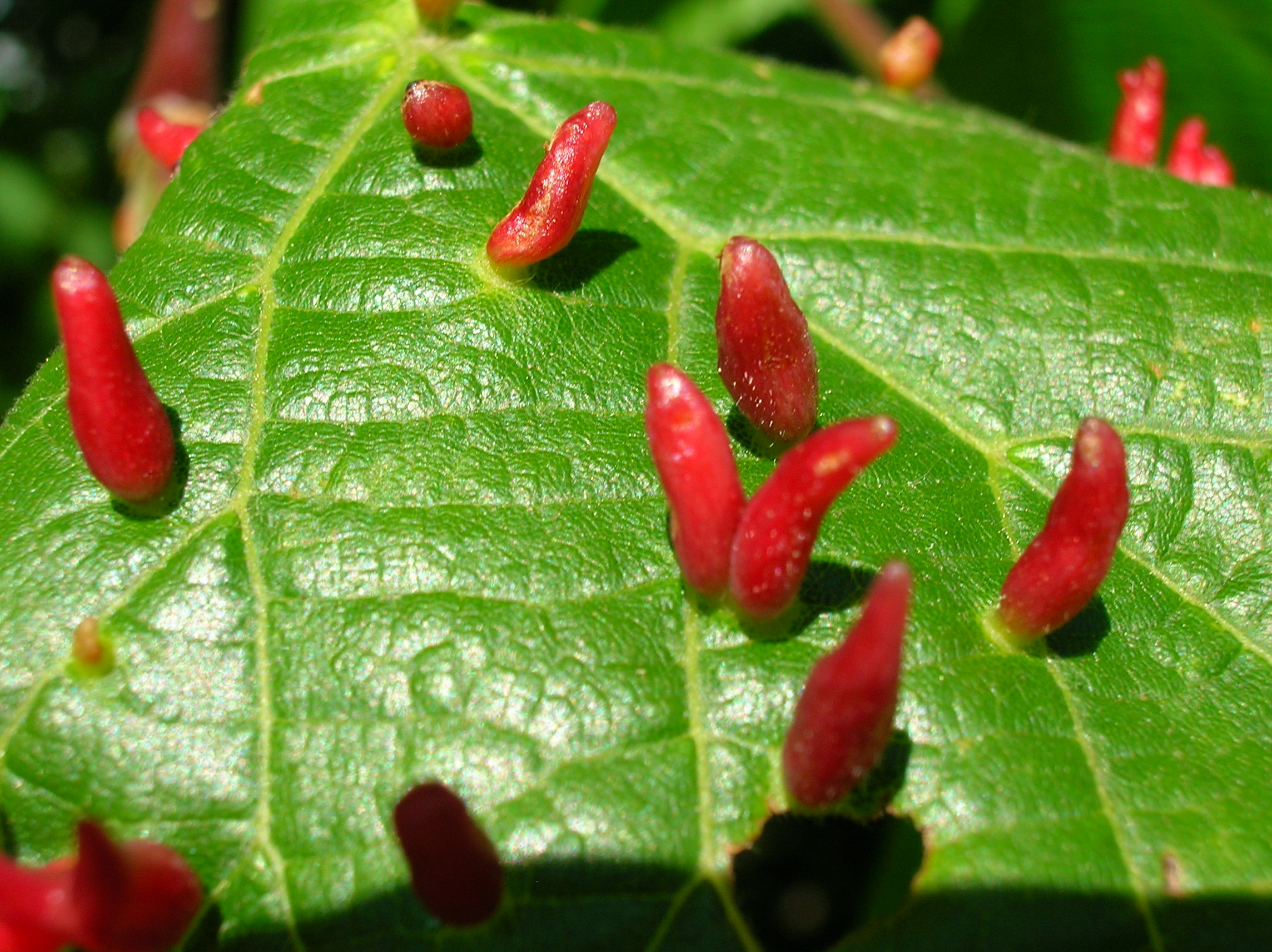
Eriophyes tiliae galls growing on a lime tree leaf

All of the Eriophyoidea are parasites of plants. This is reflected in common names such as "blister mites", "bud mites", "gall mites" and "rust mites". The superfamily includes many important crop pests, some of which transmit plant diseases.

As previously mentioned, some eriophyoid species can produce two forms of females. The deutogyne form is more tolerant of adverse conditions than the protogyne form. This polymorphism mainly occurs in species on deciduous plants that experience well-defined winters.

== Evolution ==
The group is ancient. Forms with two pairs of legs, already similar to the modern ones, have been found in Triassic amber from Italy: Ampezzoa, Triasacarus, Minyacarus and Cheirolepidoptus, which were specialised on extinct conifers of family Cheirolepidiaceae. The four genera were subsequently placed in a new extinct clade, the Triasacaroidea, which is the sister group to the extant Eriophyoidea.

== Phylogeny ==
While traditionally considered members of the clade Trombidiformes, they have been found to be an early diverging mite clade outside the clade containing Trombidiformes in recent morphological and genomic analyses.
