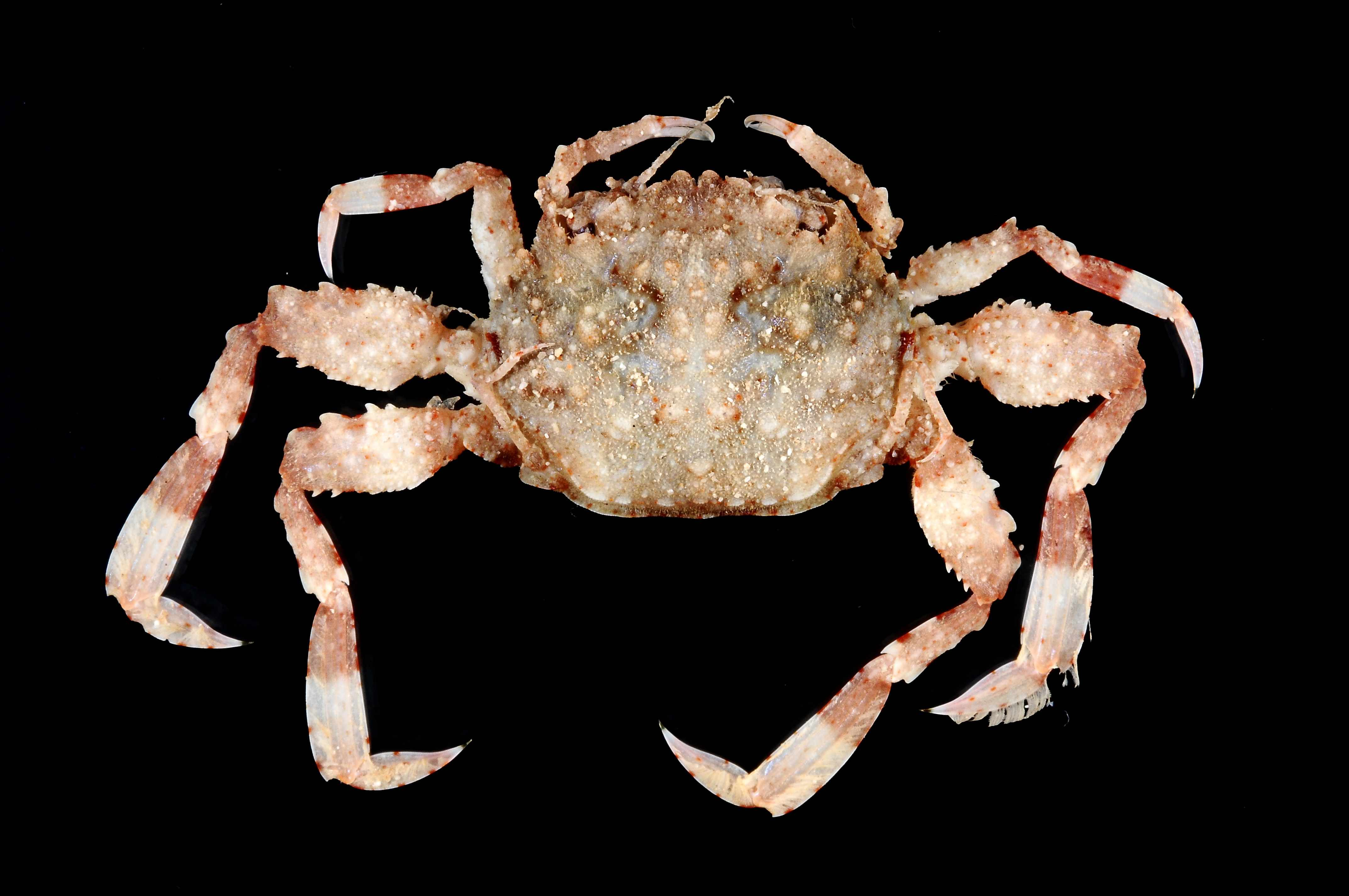
- Pseudopalicus sp.

Scientific classification
- Kingdom: Animalia
- Phylum: Arthropoda
- Clade: Pancrustacea
- Class: Malacostraca
- Order: Decapoda
- Suborder: Pleocyemata
- Infraorder: Brachyura
- Superfamily: Palicoidea
- Family: Palicidae; Bouvier, 1898

Genera
- See text

= Palicidae =

Family of crabs

The family Palicidae, sometimes called stilt crabs, are a group of crabs. Some genera previously included in this family are now placed in a separate family, the Crossotonotidae.

== Genera ==
The family Palicidae contains nine extant genera and two extinct genera :

- Eopalicus Beschin, Busulini, De Angeli & Tessier, 1996 †
- Exopalicus Castro, 2000
- Miropalicus Castro, 2000
- Neopalicus Moosa & Serène, 1981
- Palicoides Moosa & Serène, 1981
- Paliculus Castro, 2000
- Palicus Philippi, 1838
- Parapalicus Moosa & Serène, 1981
- Pseudopalicus Moosa & Serène, 1981
- Rectopalicus Castro, 2000
- Spinipalicus Beschin & De Angeli, 2003 †
