= Ceratobairdia =

Ceratobairdia Temporal range: Permian-Jurassic

Scientific classification
- Kingdom: Animalia
- Phylum: Arthropoda
- Clade: Pancrustacea
- Class: Ostracoda
- Order: Podocopida
- Family: Bairdiidae
- Genus: †Ceratobairdia; Sohn, 1954

Extinct genus of seed shrimp

Ceratobairdia is an extinct genus of ostracod (seed shrimp) belonging to the order Podocopida and family Bairdiidae. Specimens have been found in Permian to Jurassic beds in North America, China, and Europe.

The genus is heavily ornamented, and a distinctive characteristic is that its valves (shells) have a flat ventral surface and a ventrolateral alate ridge (a winglike ridge extending from the ventral surface to the side of the valve.) The genus is also notable as a Lazarus taxon, disappearing in the Permian-Triassic extinction event and reappearing in the Carnian, an interval of at least 15 million years.

== Species ==
- Ceratobairdia ambigua Ishizaki 1964
- Ceratobairdia dorsospinosa Sohn 1954
- Ceratobairdia sinensis Wang 1978
- Ceratobairdia triassica Bolz 1971
- Ceratobairdia venterocostata Wang 1978
- Ceratobairdia xiaobaensis Xie 1989
