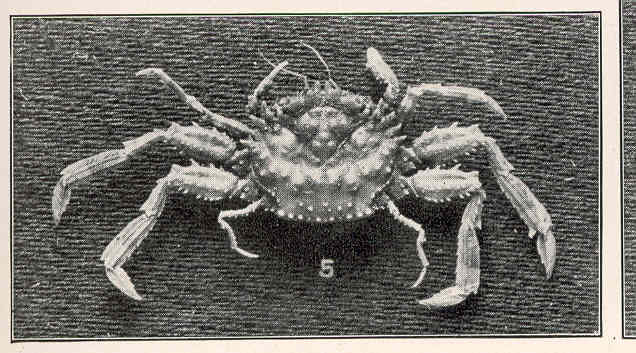
- Palicus fisheri

Scientific classification
- Kingdom: Animalia
- Phylum: Arthropoda
- Clade: Pancrustacea
- Class: Malacostraca
- Order: Decapoda
- Suborder: Pleocyemata
- Infraorder: Brachyura
- Family: Palicidae
- Genus: Palicus; Philippi, 1838

Type species
- Palicus granulatus Philippi, 1838

= Palicus =

Genus of crabs

Palicus is a genus of stilt crabs in the family Palicidae.

== Species ==
The following species are included in the genus:

- Palicus acutifrons (A. Milne-Edwards, 1880)
- Palicus affinis (A. Milne-Edwards & Bouvier, 1880)
- Palicus alternatus Rathbun, 1897
- Palicus angustus Rathbun, 1897
- Palicus bahamensis Rathbun, 1897
- Palicus caronii (Roux, 1828)
- Palicus cortezi (Crane, 1937)
- Palicus cristatipes (A. Milne-Edwards, 1880)
- Palicus cursor (A. Milne-Edwards, 1880)
- Palicus dentatus (A. Milne-Edwards, 1880)
- Palicus depressus Rathbun, 1897
- Palicus faxoni Rathbun, 1897
- Palicus floridanus (Rathbun, 1918)
- Palicus fragilis (Rathbun, 1894)
- Palicus gracilipes (A. Milne-Edwards, 1880)
- Palicus gracilis (Smith, 1883)
- †Palicus hungaricus Müller, 2006
- Palicus isthmia Rathbun, 1897
- Palicus lucasii Rathbun, 1898
- Palicus obesus (A. Milne-Edwards, 1880)
- Palicus sicus (A. Milne-Edwards, 1880)
- Palicus tuberculata (Faxon, 1893)
- Palicus velerae (Garth, 1939)
- Palicus zonatus (Rathbun, 1894)
