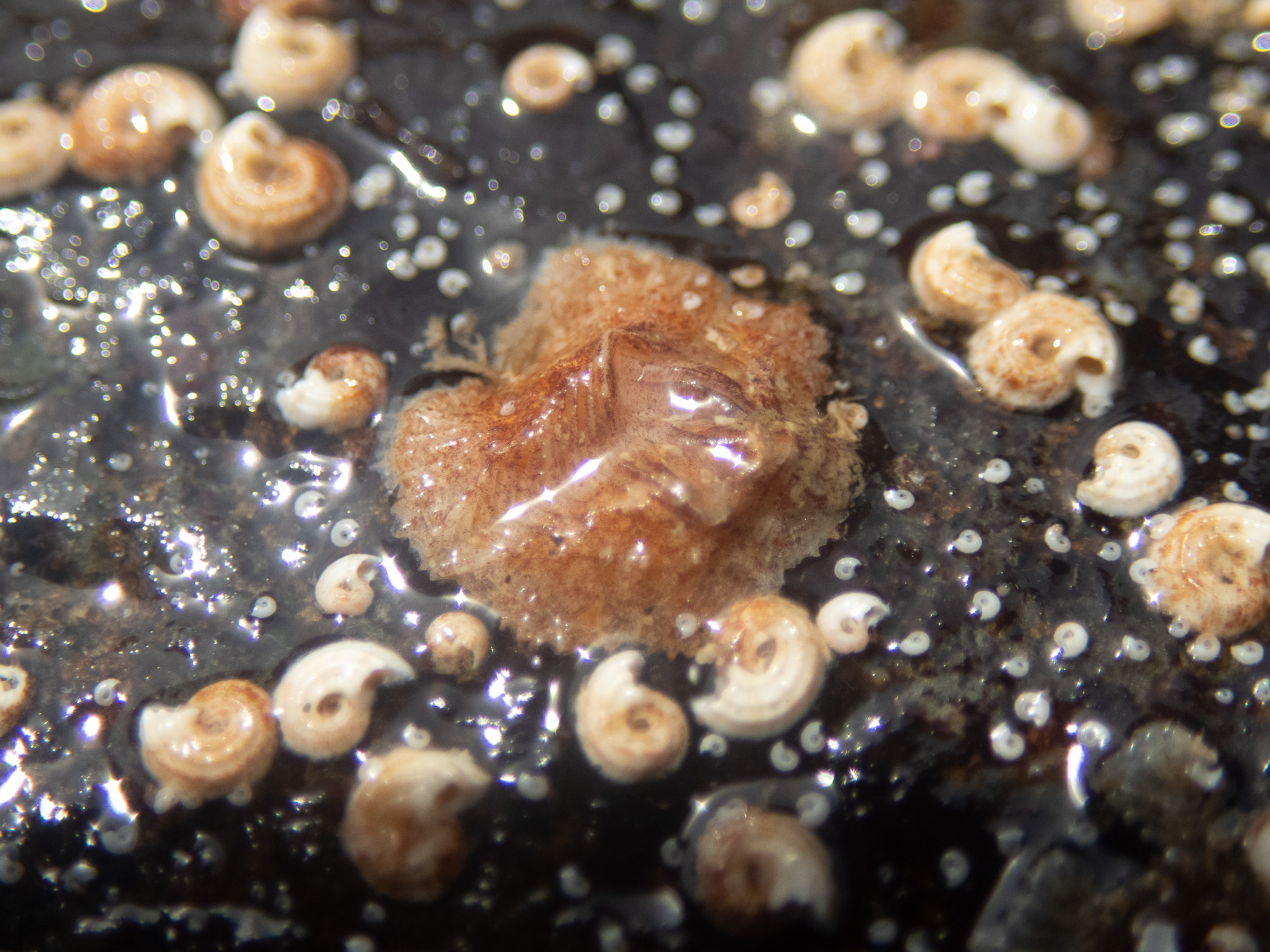
- Verruca stroemia, Northern Ireland

Scientific classification
- Kingdom: Animalia
- Phylum: Arthropoda
- Class: Thecostraca
- Subclass: Cirripedia
- Order: Verrucomorpha
- Family: Verrucidae
- Genus: Verruca; Schumacher, 1817

= Verruca (crustacean) =

Genus of crustaceans

Verruca is a genus of asymmetrical sessile barnacles in the family Verrucidae. There are about 20 described species in Verruca, around half of them extinct.

== Species ==
These species belong to the genus Verruca:

- Verruca cookei Pilsbry, 1928
- Verruca gibbosa Hoek, 1883
- Verruca jago Buckeridge, 1997
- Verruca laevigata (Sowerby, 1827)
- Verruca minuta Young, 2000
- Verruca mitra Hoek, 1907
- Verruca scrippsae Zullo, 1964
- Verruca sewelli Stubbings, 1936
- Verruca spengleri Darwin, 1854
- Verruca stroemia (O.F. Müller, 1776) (wart barnacle)
- Verruca vertica
- † Verruca alaskana Pilsbry, 1943
- † Verruca gailgoedertae Perreault & Buckeridge, 2019
- † Verruca koikei Tanaka et al. in Koike et al., 2006
- † Verruca prisca Bosquet, 1854
- † Verruca punica Buckeridge & Jagt, 2008
- † Verruca pusilla Bosquet, 1857
- † Verruca sorrellae Perreault & Buckeridge, 2019
- † Verruca steenstrupi Brünnich Nielsen, 1912
- † Verruca tasmanica Buckeridge, 1983
- † Verruca veneta Carriol & Diemi, 2005
- † Verruca withersi Kruizinga, 1939
