= Cheirolepidoptus =

Cheirolepidoptus Temporal range: Triassic

Scientific classification
- Kingdom: Animalia
- Phylum: Arthropoda
- Class: Arachnida
- Subclass: Acari
- Family: Triasacaridae
- Genus: Cheirolepidoptus Sidorchuk & Lindquist, 2014
- Species: C. dolomiticus

Binomial name
- Cheirolepidoptus dolomiticus Sidorchuk & Lindquist, 2014

Extinct genus of mites

Cheirolepidoptus is a genus of extinct mite found in Italy. It was classified in 2014. It was found in amber from northern Italy, dating to the Triassic period.
