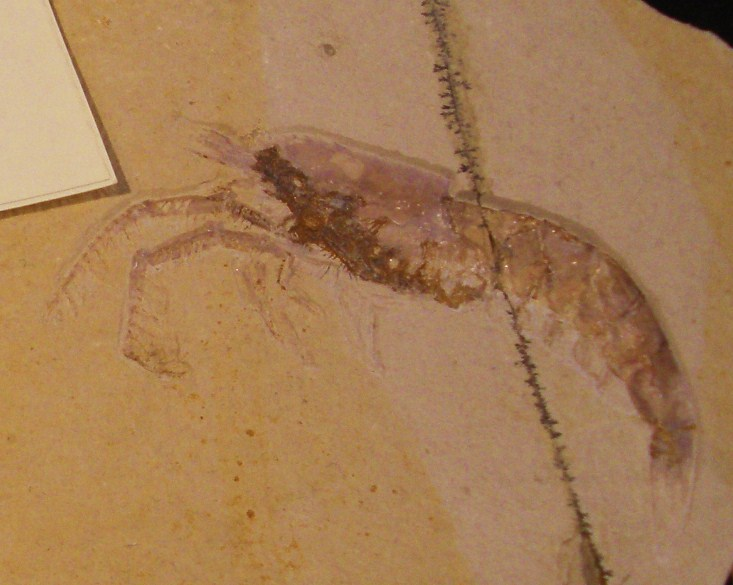
- Acanthochirana cordata

Scientific classification
- Kingdom: Animalia
- Phylum: Arthropoda
- Class: Malacostraca
- Order: Decapoda
- Suborder: Dendrobranchiata
- Family: †Aegeridae
- Genus: †Acanthochirana; Strand, 1928

Type species
- Udora cordata Münster, 1839

Synonyms
- Acanthochirus Oppel, 1862

= Acanthochirana =

Acanthochirana Temporal range: Jurassic

Extinct genus of crustaceans

Acanthochirana is an extinct genus of prawn that existed during the upper Jurassic period. It was named by E. Strand in 1928. They are distinguished from the related genus Aeger by the presence of teeth on the rostrum, which are absent in Aeger.

== Species ==
As of 2022, Acanthochirana includes eight species:

- Acanthochirana angulata (Oppel, 1862)
- Acanthochirana cordata (Münster, 1839) (=A. longipes Oppel, 1862)
- Acanthochirana krausei (Förster, 1967)
- Acanthochirana liburiansis (Garassino et al., 2014)
- Acanthochirana norica (Pinna, 1974)
- Acanthochirana smithwoodwardi (Van Straelen, 1940) (=A. cenomanicus Glaessner, 1945)
- Acanthochirana spinifera (Schweitzer et al., 2014)
- Acanthochirana triassica (Garassino et al., 2013)
