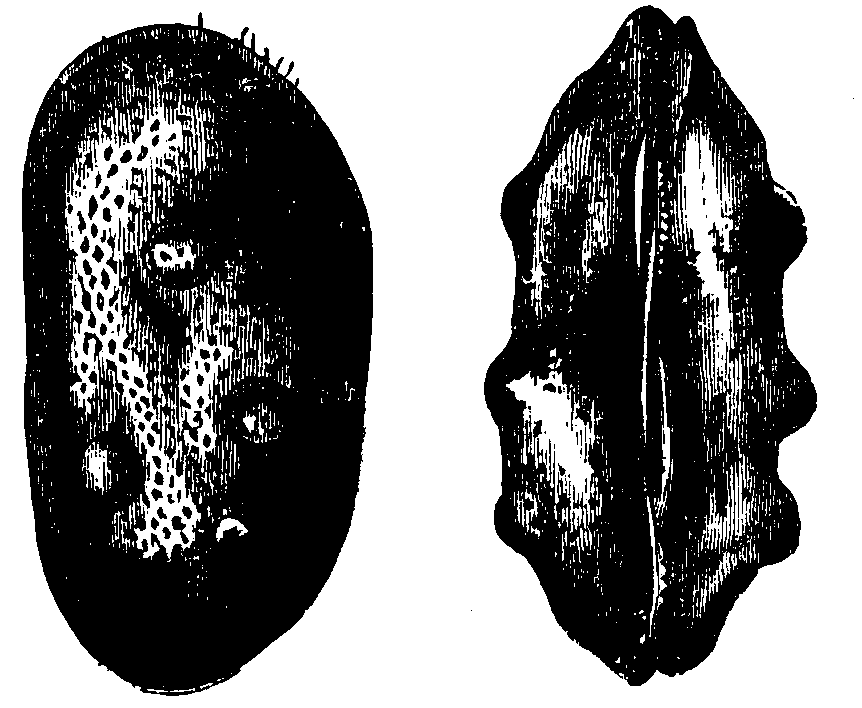
- Cytheridea

Scientific classification
- Kingdom: Animalia
- Phylum: Arthropoda
- Clade: Pancrustacea
- Class: Ostracoda
- Order: Podocopida
- Superfamily: Cytheroidea
- Family: Cytherideidae; Sars, 1925

= Cytherideidae =

Family of crustaceans

Cytherideidae is a family of ostracods belonging to the order Podocopida.

== Genera ==
Genera:

- Amazonacytheridea Purper, 1979
- Anomocythere Sohn, 1951
- Archeocyprideis Ducasse & Carbonel, 1994
- Cyprideis
- Cytheridea
- Heterocyprideis
- Miocyprideis
- Peratocytheridea
- Sarsicytheridea
