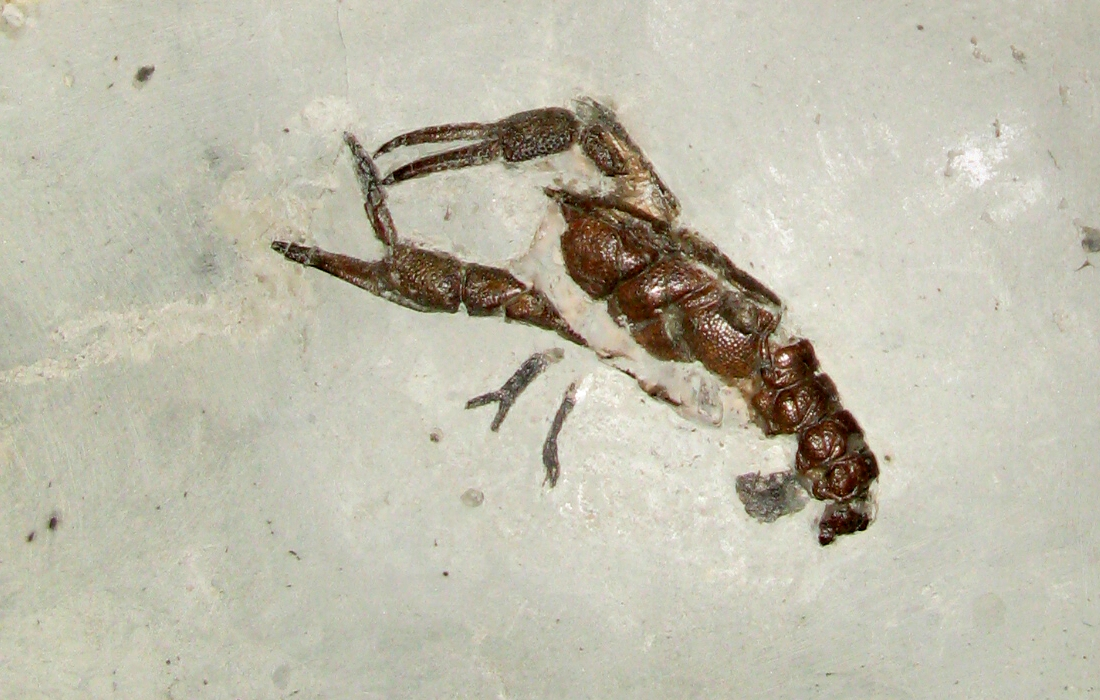
- Eryma mandelslohi specimen on display at the State Museum of Natural History Stuttgart

Scientific classification
- Kingdom: Animalia
- Phylum: Arthropoda
- Clade: Pancrustacea
- Class: Malacostraca
- Order: Decapoda
- Suborder: Pleocyemata
- Family: †Erymidae
- Genus: †Eryma von Meyer, 1840

= Eryma =

Eryma Temporal range: Permian–Cretaceous

Extinct genus of crustaceans

Eryma is a genus of fossil lobster-like crustaceans, containing 44 species. The oldest known species was discovered in non-marine deposits from the late Permian Ust-Yenisei Borehole in Russia. Other species are known from much of the world, especially Europe and North America.

== Species ==
There are 44 known species of Eryma:

- E. affinis
- E. amalthei
- E. americana
- E. americanum
- E. anisodactylum
- E. antiquum
- E. australe
- E. babeaui
- E. birdi
- E. boloniensis
- E. bordenensis
- E. caraboeufi
- E. compressum
- E. corallinum
- E. crassimanum
- E. cumonti
- E. dutertrei
- E. flecta
- E. flectum
- E. fossatum
- E. georgei
- E. glaessneri
- E. gracilimanum
- E. hoerstgenensis
- E. jungostrix
- E. lafayi
- E. lerasi
- E. leucodermum
- E. madagascariensis
- E. major
- E. mandelslohi
- E. modestiforme
- E. modestiformis
- E. mosquensis
- E. nippon
- E. ollerenshawi
- E. ornatum
- E. oscari
- E. osciensis
- E. pulchellum
- E. punctatum
- E. quadriverrucatum
- E. quenstedti
- E. radiatum
- E. rinellincolum
- E. romani
- E. sinemurianum
- E. squalidum
- E. stantoni
- E. strambergensis
- E. stricklandi
- E. sulcatum
- E. veltheimii
- E. ventrosum
- E. vocontii
