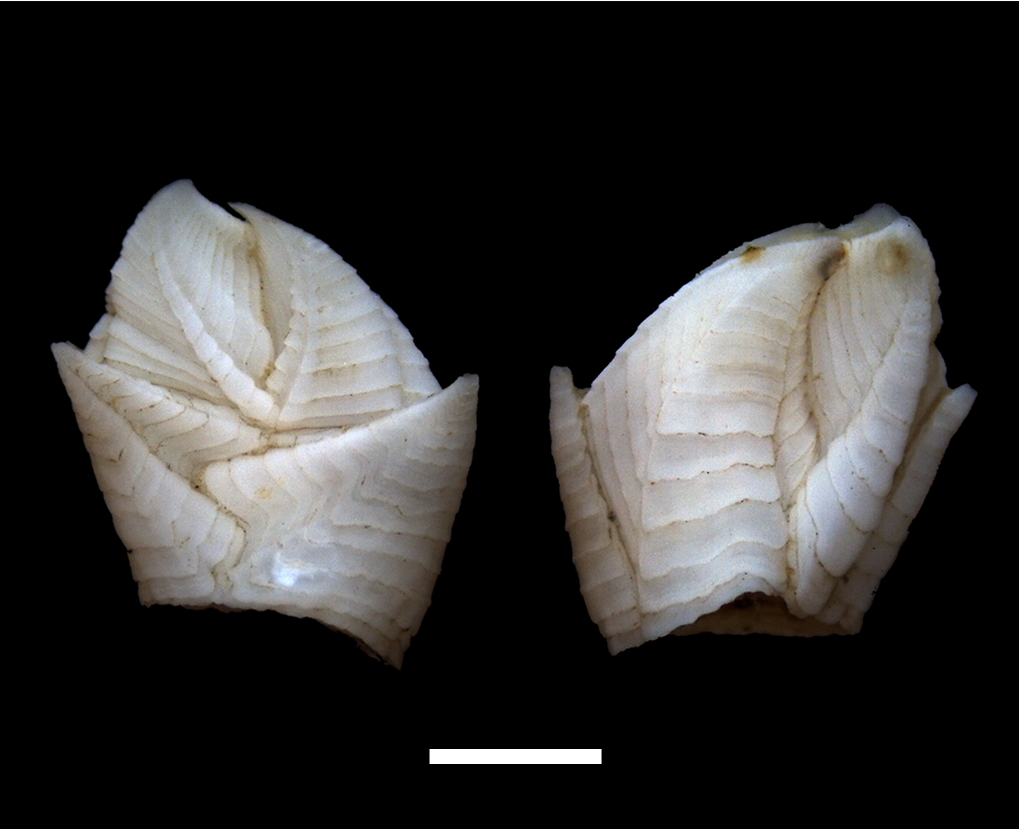
- Altiverruca nitida, South Africa

Scientific classification
- Kingdom: Animalia
- Phylum: Arthropoda
- Clade: Pancrustacea
- Class: Thecostraca
- Subclass: Cirripedia
- Infraclass: Thoracica
- Superorder: Thoracicalcarea
- (unranked): Sessilia
- Order: Verrucomorpha; Pilsbry, 1916

= Verrucomorpha =

Suborder of crustaceans

Verrucomorpha is an order of asymmetrical sessile barnacles in the class Thecostraca. They are typically found in deeper and deep-sea habitats. There are 2 families and more than 100 described species in Verrucomorpha.

== Families ==
These families belong to the order Verrucomorpha:

Order Verrucomorpha Pilsbry, 1916

Family Verrucidae Darwin, 1854

Genus Altiverruca Pilsbry, 1916
Genus Brochiverruca Zevina, 1993
Genus Cameraverruca Pilsbry, 1916
Genus Costatoverruca Young, 1998
Genus Cristallinaverruca Young, 2002
Genus Gibbosaverruca Young, 2002
Genus Globuloverruca Young, 2004
Genus Metaverruca Pilsbry, 1916
Genus Newmaniverruca Young, 1998
Genus Rostratoverruca Broch, 1922
Genus Spongoverruca Zevina, 1987
Genus Verruca Schumacher, 1817
Genus †Priscoverruca Gale, 2014
Genus †Youngiverruca Gale, 2014

Family †Eoverrucidae Gale, 2020

Genus †Eoverruca Withers, 1935
