= Rzehakinidae =

Scientific classification
- Domain: Eukaryota
- (unranked): SAR
- (unranked): Rhizaria
- Superphylum: Retaria
- Phylum: Foraminifera
- Order: Textulariida
- Superfamily: Rzehakinoidea
- Family: Rzehakinidae Cushman, 1933

Genera
- See text

Family of single-celled organisms

The Rzehakinidae is a family of Lower Cretaceous to recent formaminifera that resemble the calcareous imperforate Miliolidae but which are constructed of finely agglutinated material that veneers an organic base. Tests are with two, or less commonly three, chambers per whorl, which are commonly added in various planes. In form they are generally ovoid.

The Rzehakinidae was included in the Lituolacea, (Textulariina) in the Treatise Part C, 1964, and removed by Loeblich and Tappan, 1982 to its own superfamily, the Rzehakinacea. Eleven genera are included:

Rzehakina
Ammoflintina
Birsteiniolla
Miliammina
Psamminopelta
Rothina
Silicomassilina
Silicosigmoilina
Spirolocammina
Spirosigmoilinella
Trilocularena
