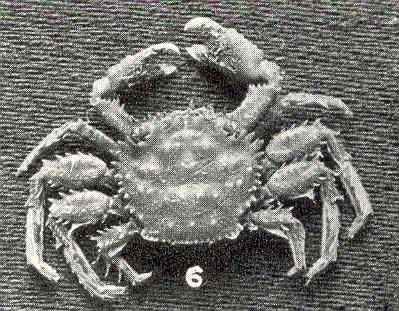
- Crossotonotus spinipes

Scientific classification
- Domain: Eukaryota
- Kingdom: Animalia
- Phylum: Arthropoda
- Class: Malacostraca
- Order: Decapoda
- Suborder: Pleocyemata
- Infraorder: Brachyura
- Superfamily: Palicoidea
- Family: Crossotonotidae; Moosa & Serène, 1981

= Crossotonotidae =

Family of crustaceans

Crossotonotidae is a family of crustaceans belonging to the order Decapoda.

Genera:

- Crossotonotus Milne-Edwards, 1873
- †Montemagrellus De Angeli & Ceccon, 2014
- Pleurophricus Milne-Edwards, 1873
