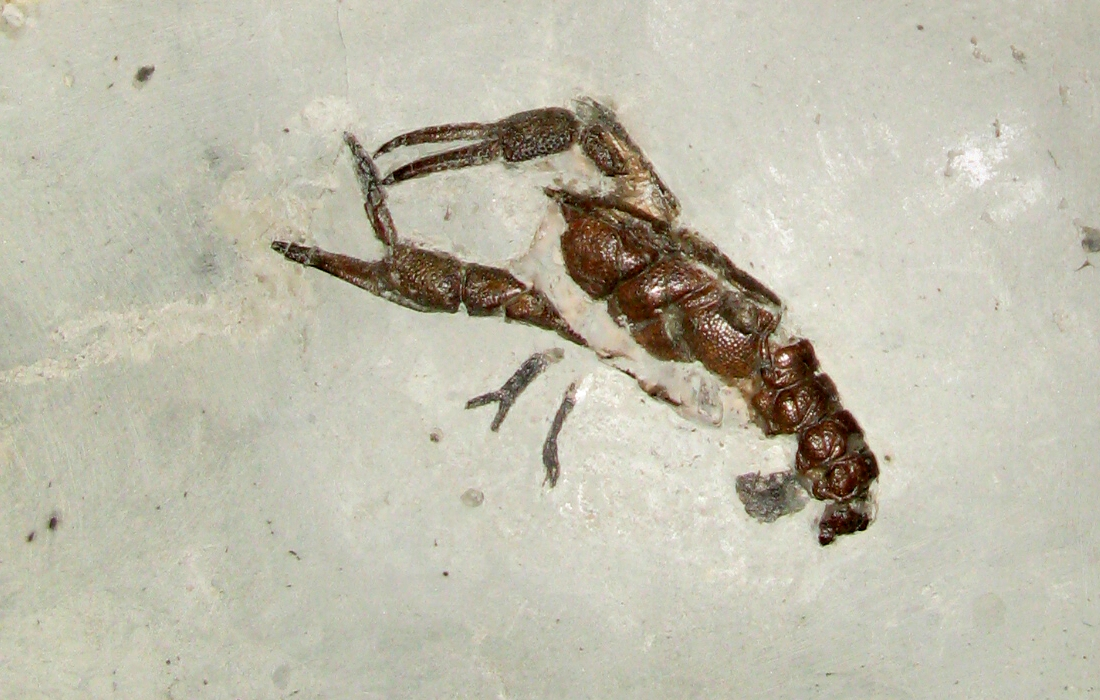
- Eryma mandelslohi

Scientific classification
- Kingdom: Animalia
- Phylum: Arthropoda
- Clade: Pancrustacea
- Class: Malacostraca
- Order: Decapoda
- Suborder: Pleocyemata
- Infraorder: Glypheidea
- Superfamily: Erymoidea; Van Straelen, 1924
- Family: †Erymidae; Van Straelen, 1924

= Erymidae =

Erymidae Temporal range: Early Triassic–Albian

Extinct family of crustaceans

Erymidae is a family of decapod crustaceans known only from fossils. They survived for 100 million years, from the Permo-Triassic boundary to the Albian. Eleven genera are recognised:

- Clytiella Glaessner, 1931 – 1 species
- Clytiopsis Bill, 1914 – 3 species
- Enoploclytia M’Coy, 1849 – 20 species
- Eryma Von Meyer, 1840 – 44 species
- Galicia Garassino & Krobicki, 2002 – 3 species
- Lissocardia Von Meyer, 1851 – 3 species
- Palaeastacus Bell, 1850 – 24 species
- Paraclytiopsis Oravec, 1962 – 1 species
- Protoclytiopsis Birshtein, 1958 – 1 species
- Pustulina Quenstedt, 1857 – 12 species
- Stenodactylina Beurlen, 1928 – 1 species
