= Involutinidae =

Involutinida Temporal range: Early Permian - Cenomanian.

Scientific classification
- Domain: Eukaryota
- Clade: Sar
- Clade: Rhizaria
- Phylum: Retaria
- Subphylum: Foraminifera
- Class: Tubothalamea
- Order: †Involutinida
- Family: †Involutinidae

Subfamilies
- See text

Family of single-celled organisms

The Involutinidae are a family of foraminifera included in the Involutinida, characterized by calcareous tests consisting of an undivided planispirally to trochospirally coiled tubular second chamber wound around the initial proloculus, and which may have thickenings or nodes on one or both sides. This family includes four subfamilies, Aulotortinae, Involutininae, Triadodiscinae, and Triasininae.

The Involutinidae were previously included in the Treatise on Invertebrate Paleontology Part C, 1964.
