= Aquitaine Basin =

Sedimentary basin in France

- Location of the Aquitaine Basin in France
- Coordinates: 44°16′N 0°10′W
- Etymology: Aquitaine
- Country: France
- States: Nouvelle-Aquitaine, Occitanie
- Cities: Bordeaux, Toulouse, Bayonne, Pau

Characteristics
- On/Offshore: Onshore
- Boundaries: Armorican Massif, Paris Basin, Massif Central, Pyrenees, Atlantic Ocean
- Part of: Pyrenean foreland basins
- Area: 66,000 km^{2} (25,000 sq mi)

Hydrology
- River: Garonne
- Lakes: Lac d'Hourtin-Carcans, Étang de Cazaux et de Sanguinet

Geology
- Basin type: Foreland basin
- Plate: Eurasian
- Orogeny: Alpine
- Age: Early Triassic-Holocene
- Stratigraphy: Stratigraphy
- Fields: Parentis, Cazaux, Lavergne (oil); Lacq, Meillon, Saint-Marcet (gas)

The Aquitaine Basin is the second largest Mesozoic and Cenozoic sedimentary basin in France after the Paris Basin, occupying a large part of the country's southwestern quadrant. Its surface area covers 66,000 km^{2} onshore. It formed on Variscan basement which was peneplained during the Permian and then started subsiding in the early Triassic. The basement is covered in the Parentis Basin and in the Subpyrenean Basin—both sub-basins of the main Aquitaine Basin—by 11,000 m of sediment.

== Geography ==
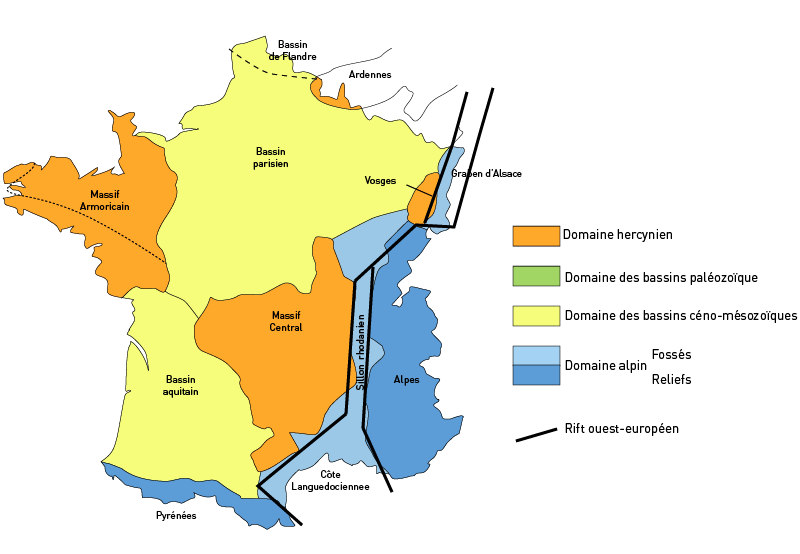
The geological provinces of France, the Aquitaine Basin on the lower left hand side

The Aquitaine Basin, named after the French region Aquitaine, is roughly funnel-shaped with its opening pointing towards the Atlantic Ocean. Here it meets for 330 km the straight, more or less north–south-trending Atlantic coastline but continues offshore to the continental slope. To the south, it is delimitated for 350 km by the west-northwest–east-southeast trending Pyrenees. In the southeast, the basin reaches the Seuil de Naurouze (also called Seuil du Lauragais) between the Montagne Noire on its northern side and the Mouthoumet range in the south. Just west of Narbonne, the basin is overridden by Pyrenean thrusts. The northeastern boundary of the basin is formed by the arcuate basement outcrops of the Massif Central. Via the 100 km wide Seuil du Poitou in the northeast, the basin is connected to the Paris Basin. In the far north, the basin abuts the east–west-oriented Variscan basement of the Vendée, the southernmost part of the Armorican Massif.

== Basin structure ==
The Aquitaine Basin is a very asymmetric foreland basin. It reaches its deepest part of 11 km just in front of the North Pyrenean Thrust.

The 2,000 m isobath follows more or less the course of the Garonne River and divides the basin into a relatively shallow northern platform, the so-called Aquitaine Plateau, and into a much deeper, tightly folded, southern region. The tabular platform in the north contains only a much reduced sedimentary succession that is gently undulating and occasionally faulted. The folding intensity in the southern region increases steadily towards the south, the structures being further complicated by superimposed salt diapirism.

This somewhat simplified structural subdivision gets complicated by the Parentis Basin which extends out into the Atlantic. The Parentis Basin is situated in the Golfe de Gascogne and also reaches 11 km depth; it is a symmetrical basin oriented east–west and comes ashore near Arcachon. This sub-basin is underlain on its far western side by oceanic crust dated at 100–95 million years BP (Cenomanian). It is bounded by dextral wrench faults (possible transform faults) and probably represents a pull-apart basin.

== Stratigraphy ==
(Note: Permo-Triassic basins like the Brive Basin and the Grésigne Basin are considered to belong to the basement of the Massif Central.)

Structural and sedimentological investigations of the basin have been carried out in over 70 drilled wells that encountered the Variscan basement sometimes below 6,000 m of sedimentary cover.

The sedimentary evolution in the Aquitaine Basin begins in the Lower Triassic close to the North Pyrenean Thrust. From here, it slowly started spreading farther north.

=== Triassic ===
Sedimentation started in the very south of the Aquitaine Basin during the Lower Triassic with coloured sandstones and mudstones, followed during the Middle Triassic by dolomitic limestones, evaporite strata and coloured mudstones. During the Upper Triassic evaporites continued being precipitated, crowned by ophitic lava flows (dolerites and tholeiites). The evaporites were later activated as diapirs during the Pyrenean orogeny and the mudstones served as decollement horizons along which Triassic sediments were squeezed northwards to the line Arcachon–Toulouse.

The sediments are typically germanotype in character, i.e. very similar to the Triassic succession in Germany. In the north of the Aquitanian plateau, only a continental Upper Triassic is preserved. In the south, the sediments are marine and show their full development. The Triassic marine transgression probably invaded the southern Aquitaine Basin from the southeast or from the south (from the Tethys) via the then still immersed Pyrenean region. The sediments indicate a restricted shallow marine environment with drying-up periods that created evaporites. The Triassic sediments can attain a maximum thickness of 1,000 m and reach as far north as the line Garonne estuary – Brive.

=== Jurassic ===
The entirely marine Jurassic cycle can be subdivided into seven second-order sequences bounded by unconformities, three in the Lias, two in the Dogger and two in the Malm:

- Hettangian-Sinemurian sequence.
- Lotharingian-Carixian-Domerian sequence (Upper Sinemurian–Pliensbachian).
- Toarcian-Aalenian sequence.
- Bajocian–Lower Bathonian sequence.
- Middle Bathonian–Callovian sequence.
- Oxfordian–Sequanian sequence (Oxfordian–Lower Kimmeridgian).
- Kimmeridgian–Portlandian sequence (Kimmeridgian-Tithonian).

The complete Jurassic cycle is only preserved in the Quercy; farther south, e.g. in the Subpyrenean Basin, the cycle has many gaps.

==== Lias ====
The basal Hettangian-Sinemurian sequence is fully transgressive over basement rocks or Permo-Triassic sediments. At that time, the first open-marine sediments (yet rather poor in fossils) were being deposited in the Aquitaine Basin. The Lias Transgression, as it is also called, started to encroach on the entire Aquitaine during the Sinemurian, characterised by calcareous-dolomitic, partially oolitic sediments. Despite smaller regressions during the Pliensbachian towards the end of the Lias and at the beginning of the Dogger the sea had onlapped the basement rocks of the Massif Central and the western Vendée (reaching today's limits) by 30 km. On the Aquitaine Plateau in the north, an interior shelf was constructed as far south as the line La Rochelle-Angoulême-Périgueux-Figeac. On this shelf the generally detritic transgression sediments of the Hettangian normally comprise a base conglomerate, arkoses, and fairly thick layers of sand- and mud-stones rich in plant material. The rest of the Hettangian is made up of marine sediments deposited in a restricted environment (lagoonal) evolving towards a lacustrine facies (green shales, coloured marls, dolomitic limestones and platy limestones rich in dwarf fossils, and evaporitic interlayers). The sediments of the Sinemurian are again fully marine and carry a pelagic fauna (soft banded limestones and hard lithographic limestones). At the end of the Sinemurian, a sudden regression occurred, forming hardgrounds.

The second sequence of the Lias again is marine-transgressive and commences during the Lotharingian/Lower Carixian. The sediments can be well dated by ammonites—(Arietites, Oxynoticeras, Deroceras, and Uptonia jamesoni). They are mainly calcareous and rich in quartz grains and pebbles of reworked Sinemurian. The Upper Carixian consists of very fossiliferous (Aegoceras capricornu) marly limestone layers interlayered with grey marls. These are followed by ammonite-bearing (Amaltheus margaritatus) and oyster-bearing (Gryphaea cymbium) marls indicating a shelf environment open to the spreading Atlantic Ocean. During the Lower Domerian, a connection to the Paris Basin is breached for the first time via the Seuil du Poitou and also to the Jurassic sea of southeastern France via the Détroit de Rodez and the Détroit de Carcassonne. During the Upper Domerian, another regression sets in leaving sandy limestones very rich in fossils (Pleuroceras spinatum, Pecten aequivalvis). These littoral facies rocks can change into iron-rich oolites along their margins. The sequence finishes again with hardgrounds.

The third and last sequence of the Lias sets in during the Lower Toarcian without any detrital deposits at its base, the sediments being black ammonite-bearing marls (with Harpoceras falciferum and Hildoceras bifrons). Towards the end of the Toarcian and the beginning of the Aalenian, the sediments turn into sandy limestones indicating another regression. Interlayered with these sandy limestones are oyster beds, iron oolite and gypsum layers; they contain ammonites like Pleydellia aalensis and Leioceras opalinum. The sequence ends with an erosional unconformity.

In the southern part of the Aquitanian basin, the evaporite deposition (including layers of anhydrite) begun in the Triassic carries on right through the Lias; it reaches a thickness of up to 500 m.

==== Dogger ====
The Dogger attains a maximum thickness of about 300 m along a north–south-trending zone running from Angoulême to Tarbes. Along this zone reefs began to grow, splitting the Aquitaine Basin into two major facies domains. Prominent reef complexes are situated east of Angoulême, northwest of Périgueux and east of Pau. The reefs are associated with calcareous oolites and mark a high-energy zone. On the shallow shelf-domain east of the reefs, neritic limestones were deposited in the north and dolomites in the south; in the Quercy, even supratidal lignite-bearing limestones were formed. In the western domain open towards the Atlantic, the pelagic sediments comprise ammonite-bearing limy marls very rich in filamentous microfossils (bryozoans).

The first sequence in the Dogger (note: sequences are only distinguished in the eastern shelf-domain) starts transgressing in a restricted environment during the Bajocian with dolomite. In places, Aalenian is reworked. The Bathonian is calcareous in the northeast, whereas in the southeast it keeps its dolomitic character. The end of the sequence in the Lower Bathonian shows regressive tendencies with lignites, breccias, and lacustrine fossils in the Quercy. No ammonites are found in the eastern domain right up to the Kimmeridgian—a great handicap for correct dating purposes.

The Pyrenean realm meanwhile is characterised by a long hiatus.

The second sequence in the Dogger begins in the Middle Bathonian with lacustrine limestones and in places with breccia-bearing detritus. This is followed by neritic limestones precipitated in calm conditions. Yet in the south, dolomites continue to be deposited. The sequence finishes in the Callovian with littoral border-facies deposits.

==== Malm ====
The facies dividing reef-zone persists into the Malm. In the western domain, initially ammonite-bearing marls and limestones were deposited, whereas in the eastern domain the sediments are calcareous dolomites. The retreat of the Jurassic sea became noticeable during the late Tithonian with dolomites and breccias in the Adour Basin, evaporites in the Charente, extremely littoral sediments in the Quercy, lacustrine limestones in the Parentis Basin, and anhydrites in the Gers. The seaways that had opened in the Lias closed again and a single reef persisted in the Périgord at La Tour-Blanche. In the end, the sea withdrew south of the Garonne River.

In the Lower Oxfordian, the first sequence of the Malm seems to follow the Callovian without a distinctive break. Yet cellular limestones and breccias indicate sediment reworking (this was certainly the case in the Grands Causses farther east). During the Middle and the Upper Oxfordian, marine limestones are laid down which incorporate occasional reefs. The Lower Kimmeridgian sediments are sedimented close to the shore, they bear oysters, urchins, and ripple marks.

The second sequence of the Malm starts in the Upper Kimmeridgian, only in places does it show regressive traits, nevertheless the sedimentary character changes. Laid down are breccias and the sediments also show synsedimentary reworkings; periodically interbedded limestones and marls carrying lignite horizons begin to form. The sediments can be dated by the ammonites Aulacostephanus and Aspidoceras orthocera. This strongly disturbed depositional environment with a coexistence of open marine facies and muds deposited under reducing conditions in a restrictive setting seems to coincide with a first sedimentary individualisation of the Pyrenean realm. The event has received its name Virgulian from the oyster Exogyra virgula. During the Tithonian, the shrinkage of the basin became even more evident, only to end in a nearly complete withdrawal of the sea from the Aquitaine Plateau before the close of the Tithonian (the south is not affected by this). During the Tithonian, iron-bearing calcareous oolites interbedded with marls, as well as dolomite and border facies deposits develop—dated by Gravesia portlandicum.

=== Lower Cretaceous ===
In comparison with the Jurassic, the Cretaceous has less pronounced sequences. The Lower Cretaceous sediments are restricted to close to the Pyrenees. Most likely the exchange of ocean water masses was better towards the Tethyan realm than towards the Atlantic.

Sedimentation increased again after a longer hiatus in the Lower Cretaceous, but only in two locales—the Parentis Basin and the Adour Basin. Both sub-basins manifest a huge subsidence. During the Lower Cretaceous the Parentis Basin received 2,000 m of sediment and the Adour Basin 4,000 m. The remainder of the Aquitaine Basin is meanwhile subjected to strong erosion.

The Angeac-Charente bonebed is a major fossil deposit in the Aquitane Basin, dating to the Berriasian.

The first deposits in the two sub-basins were littoral sediments in Wealden facies, mainly sandstones and shales. During the Barremian, marine shallow-water carbonates were precipitated, changing to detritic sediments in the northern Parentis Basin. Near Lacq, they change to lagoonal anhydrites. In the Upper Aptian, the reef-forming Urgonian facies became established in both sub-basins—fossiliferous limestones composed of algae, coralline polyps, and rudists. The Urgonian facies completely surrounds the Parentis Basin and persists into the Albian.

Since the onset of the Albian, strong halokinetic movements affect the southern Aquitaine Basin and in turn profoundly influence sedimentation patterns. As a result, breccias, thick conglomerates, and turbidites are shed. In the Parentis Basin, a distinct unconformity develops. At the same time, the sediments on the Aquitaine Plateau farther north are folded into gentle wavetrains following the Hercynian strike (northwest-southeast). All these movements are correlated with the first tectonic stirrings in the Western Pyrenees. Towards the end of the Albian, the sea level is rising and the Urgonian calcareous reefs are consequently draped by muds.

=== Upper Cretaceous ===
The transgression that began in the late Albian spread rapidly northward during the Cenomanian. In the northern part of the Aquitanian Basin, the Cenomanian sea reclaimed nearly the same areas that had been occupied by the Jurassic sea; in the east, however, it only reached the line Brive-Cahors-Agen-Muret-Carcassonne. The region of the later formed North Pyrenean Thrust is a decisive facies boundary at this time: to the north, shelf sedimentation continued but to the south rapidly subsiding basins developed into which flysch sediments (and partially also wildflysch breccias) from the Pyrenean realm were shed. Near Saint-Gaudens, the flysch sediments are even accompanied by volcanic rocks—trachytes, and ultrabasic lavas. The sedimentation in the flysch basins during the Turonian and during the Coniacian is very unsettled. The flysch sedimentation then continues right through the Upper Cretaceous, mainly interbedded sandstones and shales with some carbonaceous layers were laid down. Towards the end of the Upper Cretaceous, there are signs of the start of a regression and the sea then actually retreats before the K/T boundary. In the Subpyrenean Basin near the Petits Pyrénées, the sea lingers on till the lowermost Paleocene (Danian).

In the remainder of the Aquitaine Basin, mainly pelagic limestones (chalk facies) are sedimented during the Upper Cretaceous, including the type localities for the Coniacian, Santonian, and Campanian in the Charente.

At the northern edge of the basin, more differentiated coastal facies develop. In the north, the Cenomanian is made up of three sedimentary cycles (from young to old):

- An upper cycle with regressive tendencies. In the northwest, sandy rudist-bearing limestones and oyster-bearing marly shales were deposited; in the northeast, very shallow marine gypsum-bearing shales and sands.
- A generally deeper marine middle-cycle with marls. These sediments spread into the Quercy. In the Périgord, littoral facies and lignites accumulated near paleohighs.
- A shallow marine lower-cycle with rudist reefs in the northwest and continent-derived lignites in the northeast.

The Turonian reflects a transgressive period with the sea spreading into the Lot. At this point, the Upper Cretaceous sea had reached its highstand. This also coincides with a climatic optimum with global average sea-water temperatures around 24 °C compared to today's 13 °C. The Turonian can be subdivided into two parts:

- The so-called Angoumian (named after Angoulême) on the top. It consists of massive, partially brecciated rudist limestones at its base followed by ocre calcareous sands. The resistant Angoumian formed extensive cliffs.
- The so-called Ligerian (Latin name for the Massif Central) at the base—wavy chalky marls.

Towards the end of the Turonian, the Massif Central experienced uplift which is reflected in the sediments of the northeastern Aquitaine Basin as a strong input of detritus, mainly sands in the upper part of the Angoumian.

The Coniacian and the Santonian are expressed as typical chalky limestones in the north, but both stages take on a more sandy character east of Périgueux.

The Campanian follows after a pronounced unconformity. The southern flysch basins began to expand northward. Near Pau before the onset of the flysch sedimentation, a very strong erosion removed the entire Lower Cretaceous, the entire Jurassic and sometimes even cut right down to the basement. North of Pau, the Campanian is a marly facies called Aturian. In the northern Aquitaine Basin, the sediments become more homogenised and settle out as fully marine flint-bearing calcareous micrites.

During the Maastrichtian, a regression commences. After the initial deposition of bioclastic rudist-bearing limestones and the formation of some reef complexes composed of rudists and single corals, the sea level started dropping. Northern Aquitaine became emersed and the sea withdrew in stages southward to the line Arcachon-Toulouse. At the same time, the northern edge of the basin experienced another folding episode with low-amplitude folds striking northwest–southeast.

=== Cenozoic ===
==== Paleogene ====
During the Paleocene, the coastline roughly followed the line Arcachon-Toulouse. In the North Aquitaine Zone north of this line, the sediments possess continental character – red mudstones, sands, and lacustrine limestones. The sea made a short-lived advance into this domain and left echinid-bearing limestones behind. In the Central Aquitaine Zone (northern half of the southern basin), a shelf built out to the line Audignon-Carcassonne. Farther south in the South Aquitaine Zone, deep water conditions prevailed in the west, shallowing out towards the east. The sediments in the Aturian Gulf (Golfe Aturién) in the west are pelagic limestones containing globigerinids, operculinids, and alveolinids. Near the Petits Pyrénées, the sediments change into shallow-water facies rich in madreporians, echinids, and operculinids. Farther east in the Ariège and in the Corbières Massif, the sediments become totally continental and lacustrine.

In the Lower Eocene (Ypresian), another transgressive period saw the sea advance north into the Médoc and south of Oléron; in the southeast it even reached the Montagne Noire. In the Aturian Gulf, Globorotalia-bearing marls were deposited, while farther east turritella-rich marls and limestones were formed. The newly inundated areas receive sands and limestones rich in alveolinids and nummulites. Meanwhile, iron-rich sands (in the Charente) and molasses (in the Libournais and in the Agenais) were sedimented in the continental north and northeast. The provenance area of these continental deposits up to Middle Ypresian times was mainly the Massif Central.

The sea-level kept rising during the Middle Eocene (Lutetian and Bartonian). The area covered by alveolinid- and nummulite-bearing limestones increased, northward to Blaye and Saint-Palais and eastward into the Agenais. The Subpyrenean Basin deepened and was simultaneously being filled by conglomerates brought in from the east, the so-called Poudingues de Palassou. This marked the beginning of uplift in the Pyrenean orogen and a switch-over in detritus provenance from the Massif Central in the north to the Pyrenees in the south. Coalescing alluvial fans built out north into the Castrais. On the northern flank of the fans, lakes formed, precipitating lacustrine limestones. The detrital sediments with provenance from the meanwhile strongly eroded Massif Central (muds, sands, gravels) then affected only a small fringe zone in the northeast. In the Périgord and in the Quercy, the Sidérolithique accumulated—iron-rich sediments that resemble laterites indicating a subtropical climate.

During the Upper Eocene (Priabonian), a regression set in. The Subpyrenean Basin became completely filled with the erosional debris of the rising Pyrenees. In the Médoc, nummulite-bearing marls and limestones were still being laid down, but east of Bordeaux already continental molasses appeared that change farther south into gypsum-bearing formations.

During the Lower Oligocene (Rupelian), a permanently marine environment persists in the south with marls and sands rich in nummulites, lamellibranchs, and echinids. The anomiid-bearing limestones of the southern Médoc are lagoonal deposits. After a short-lived advance at the beginning of the Chattian with seastar-bearing limestones in the northern Médoc and in the Libournais and with mammal-bearing molasses in the Agenais, the sea made a big retreat at the end of the Oligocene. This retreat was accompanied by tectonic movements creating trains of deeper-seated anticlines in the central and northern Aquitaine Basin. The debris-carrying alluvial fans issuing from the rising Pyrenees reached into the Agenais and attained their largest extent. They pushed the surrounding belt of lakes ahead of them (in northerly directions) thereby spreading lacustrine limestones well into the Quercy, onto the Causses, and even onto the Massif Central.

==== Neogene ====
Following its retreat in the southwestern Landes, the sea began transgressing towards the north and the east during the Lower Miocene (Aquitanian). Marine, littoral, and lacustrine facies interchange. During a minor regression, a huge lake formed near Condom, the Lac de Saucats, in which grey lacustrine-limestones precipitated, the so-called Calcaire gris de l'Agenais. Shortly thereafter the sea attained its highstand. It was rimmed completely by continental deposits whose thickness increased towards the southeast. For the first time, the alluvial fans along the Pyrenean front receded, the reason being increased subsidence in front of the orogen; yet they still stretched as far north as the Agenais.

The retreat of the alluvial fans also continued during the Middle Miocene (Langhian and Serravallian). Consequently, the lacustrine band reached as far south as the Armagnac.

The Upper Miocene (Tortonian and Messinian) witnessed a drastic withdrawal of the sea to the west. This process started first in the Bordelais and in the Bazadais, ending with a nearly complete withdrawal from the basin. In areas left behind by the sea in the Armagnac, unfossiliferous sands and muds were deposited. At the same time in the north and in the east, today's river network draining the Massif Central was already being beginning to form.

During the Pliocene (Zanclean), the sea occupied merely a small strip near the Arcachon Basin south of Soustons. Sandy shales very rich in a benthic microfauna were deposited. In the rest of the Aquitaine Basin, continental sands were laid down, the so-called Sables fauves. The alluvial fans restricted their activity to the immediate vicinity of the Pyrenean mountain front and created the alluvial fans of Ger, Orignac-Cieutat, and Lannemezan. The drainage system of the Garonne already resembled more or less today's pattern, the river avoiding the Miocene gravel accumulations as much as possible and then following between Toulouse, Agen and Bordeaux a weekly subsiding graben.

The progressive landfall of the Aquitaine Basin proceeded from the northeast and was coupled with an important subaerial erosion. As a consequence several peneplanations were carved out from the detrital alluvial plains:

- an eocene peneplain.
- an aquitanian, strongly silicified peneplain. This is very well developed in the Périgord, in the Agenais, and in the Quercy.
- a pliocene (zanclean) peneplain, characterised by gravel-bearing clays in the Bordelais and in the Landes.

On the pliocene peneplain, today's drainage system was firmly established.

==== Quaternary ====
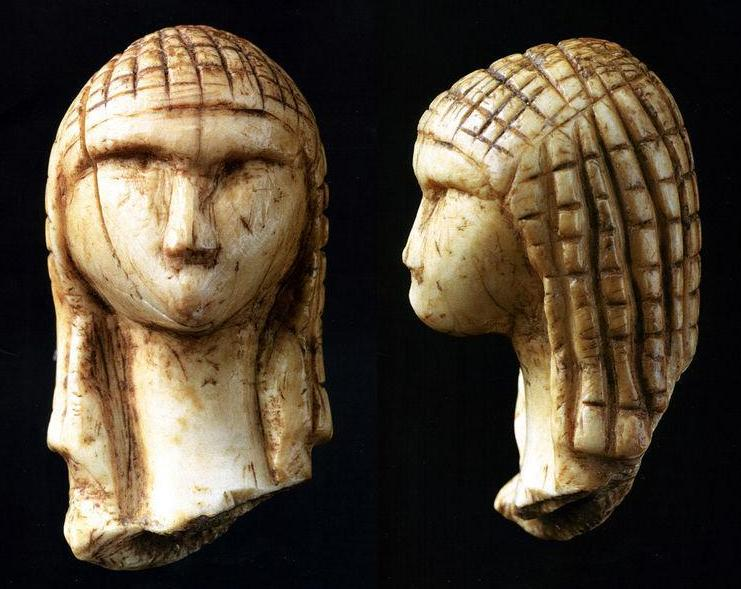
The Venus of Brassempouy, Upper Paleolithic. The first representation of a human face.

The three last Pleistocene ice ages—Mindel, Riss, and Würm—are also documented in the Aquitaine Basin, mainly by different levels of river terraces. Additionally amongst glacial phenomena the following can be cited:

- cave infills. These are very important for dating archeological finds.
- aeolian deposits. They cover more than a third of the Aquitaine region and can be found mainly in the Médoc and in the Landes. They were deposited during the last two cold stages of the Würm glaciation. The dune belt parallel to the Atlantic shoreline formed during the Holocene. It contains Europe's largest dune, The Great Dune of Pyla.
- colluvium masking hillsides and hilltops.
- creeping cryoclastic debris.

The development of the Gironde estuary goes back about 20,000 years into the late Würm.

Finally, the rich prehistoric finds and their sites in the Aquitaine Basin merit mentioning, especially in the Département Dordogne.

== Structural organisation and tectonics ==
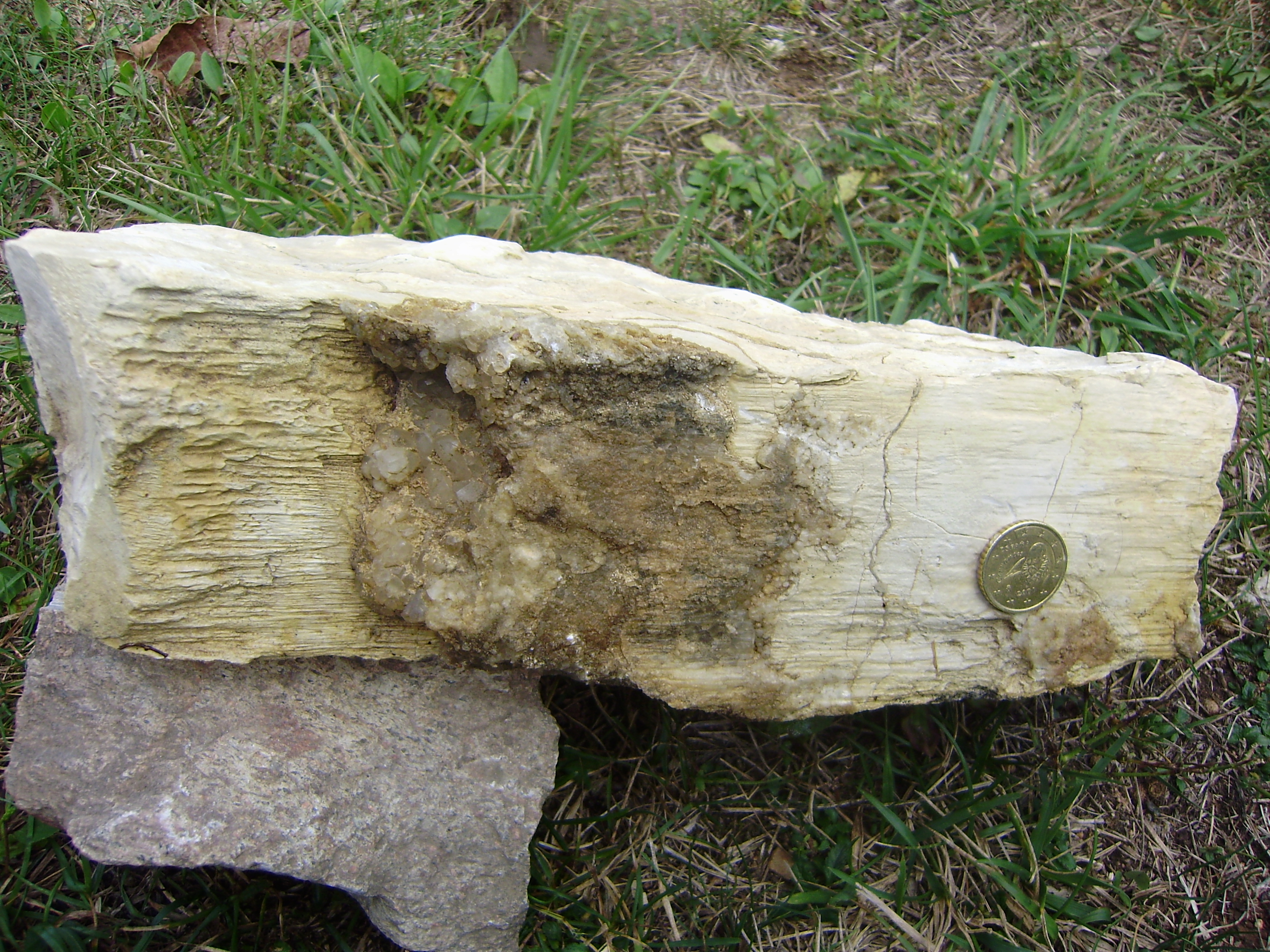
Lower Portlandian micrite from the La Tour-Blanche anticline; east-southeast-west-northwest-oriented strike-slip fault with horizontal slickolites and a calcite-filled pull-apart. Thus the anticline was also affected by transtensional wrenching motions.

Structurally the Aquitaine Basin can be divided into two provinces separated by a prominent fault zone, the so-called North Aquitaine Flexure. This fault zone extends from Arcachon to Carcassonne and represents the continuation of the continental slope onshore.

The Northern Province or Aquitaine Plateau forms a typical continental shelf region with reduced sedimentation and several periods of emersion (during the entire Lower Cretaceous and during parts of the Upper Cretaceous and the Cenozoic). The basement is rarely encountered deeper than 2,000 m. Triassic and Jurassic together have an accumulated sediment thickness of 1,000–1,700 m. The Lower Cretaceous is completely missing and the Upper Cretaceous only reaches a thickness of several hundred metres. The Paleogene is, if present, very thin in the north but increases in thickness towards the south where it is overlain by thin Neogene.

In the eastern section, one can discern several low-amplitude structures that are parallel to the Pyrenees farther south and strike west-northwest-east-southeast:

- Quercy synform.
- Tarn-et-Garonne antiform.
- Castres graben structure.
- Toulouse antiform.

Generally the Northern Province is characterised by rather simple structures (syn- and antiforms, low-amplitude fold trains, faults) that follow hercynian, armorican and variscan strike directions. The structures were formed during several tectonic phases:

- Jurassic phase. The resulting structures are mainly of synsedimentary origin and follow variscan strike directions. They profoundly influenced facies distributions and transgressive style during the Upper Cretaceous.
- Late Campanian-Maastrichtian phase. This phase enhanced the structures already formed in the Jurassic phase. The following anticlinal ridges, which run more or less parallel to the northeastern basin margin and can be traced for more than 200 km, were being generated (from north to south):
  - The Mareuil-Meyssac Anticline. This structure is an asymmetric anticline near Mareuil, becoming a high-offset normal fault between Terrasson and Meyssac.
  - The Périgueux anticline. This structure can be followed from Cognac via La Tour-Blanche to Périgueux and Saint-Cyprien. It forms a typical anticline near La Tour-Blanche. Near Saint-Cyprien, it is mainly a normal fault.
  - The Oléron-Jonzac-Ribérac-Sauveterre-la-Lemance anticline. This structure is an anticline near Jonzac and Sauveterre.
    Between the anticlines are synforms near Saintes and Sarlat.
- Eocene-Oligocene phase. More anticlines at a deeper level that are not detectable at the surface were created:
  - Northeast-southwest-striking domal upwarps near Listrac, near Blaye and near Couquèques.
  - The northwest–southeast-striking upwarp of Sainte-Hélène-Carcans.
  - The Bordeaux syncline.
  - The east–west-striking anticline of La Teste-Villagrains-Landiras-Miramont in the Guyenne.

The Southern Province is characterised by the deep Parentis and Adour sub-basins with the Mimizan high ground in between. Compared with the Northern Province its sediments show a pronounced increase in thickness (5,000–11,500 altogether). The Triassic and the Jurassic combined reach 2,000–3,000 , the Lower Cretaceous 500–1,500 m. The Upper Cretaceous can vary between 500 and 3,000 m and even the Neogene still attains a thickness of nearly 1,000 m.

The tectonic movements were much more complicated in the Southern Province, having superimposed on them very strong halokinetic motions (salt diapirism). A large part of the formed structures is concealed under Plio-Quaternary detritus. The many exploration wells drilled for hydrocarbons and groundwater helped immensely in unravelling these structures. Similar to the Northern Province, the major structures are again trains of parallel anticlines whose wavelength steadily diminishes approaching the Pyrenean front. Inversely the effects of the salt movements become stronger towards the south. The anticlines were formed during the uplift of the Pyrenees during the Eocene/Oligocene. The structures were set in place by Miocene times. The following anticlines can be distinguished (from north to south):

- Parentis-Bouglon-Agen.
- Mimizan-Roquefort-Créon-Cezans-Lavardens.
- Boos-Audignan-Nogaro.
- Saubrigues-Biarotte-Bastennes-Garlin.
- Peyrehorade-Sainte-Suzanne-Lacq-Pau-Meilhon.

Isostatic movements during the Plio-Quaternary at the northeastern edge of the Aquitaine basin lead to an uplift and rejuvenation of the peneplained basement in the Massif Central. In the Aquitaine basin itself, these movements follow already existing basement structures and entrain the tilting of some of the pliocene peneplains. This in turn has a strong effect upon the hydrographic network, for example in the drainage basins of the Garonne and Adour, the rivers' courses were changed or entirely abandoned.

Tectonic movements are still at work in the Aquitaine Basin today—strong earthquakes in the Pyrenees (with destroyed villages and churches) and somewhat milder tremors near the island of Oléron keep reminding us of that fact.

=== Tectono-metamorphic organisation of the basement ===
According to geophysical explorations the Variscan basement hidden under the sediments of the Aquitaine Basin can be subdivided into several northwest–southeast-striking tectono-metamorphic zones (from north to south):

- Ligero-arvernian Zone. The zone is limited on the south by the line Niort-Angoulême-Fumel-Montauban running parallel to the South Armorican Shear Zone farther north. It forms the polymetamorphic core region of the Variscan orogen in Europe.
- South Armorican Zone. The zone is bounded on the south by the line La Rochelle-Saintes-Chalais and pinches out near Bergerac. It is composed of southward-thrust basement nappes of Devonian/Carboniferous age.
- North Aquitaine Zone. Its southern boundary is identical with the South Variscan Thrust Front (and also the North Aquitaine Flexure) and follows the line Arcachon-Agen-Toulouse. It is made up of nappes of the orogen's external zone which were thrust southward during the Pennsylvanian.
- Aquitaine block, also called microcontinent Aquitania. It is bounded in the south by the North Pyrenean Thrust Front and is equivalent to the Southern Province. This continental foreland block already belonged to Gondwana's northern edge.

=== Depths of the Mohorovicic Discontinuity ===
The maximum depth of the Mohorovicic Discontinuity in the Aquitanian Basin is 36 km, following more or less the path of the Garonne River. Towards the Massif Central in the northeast, the discontinuity flattens out to 30 km. The same holds for approaching the northern edge of the Pyrenees, here the discontinuity is also at 30 km depth. In the oceanic part of the Parentis Basin, it is already encountered at 20 km depth. This implies a significant stretching of the continental crust and the beginning of oceanisation. As a comparison, underneath the Central Pyrenees the continental crust is 50 km thick.

== Geodynamic setting ==
For a better understanding of the geological successions and structures in the Aquitaine Basin, it is important to consider the greater geodynamic setting. Two geodynamic developments are of primordial importance for the basin:

- The break-up of Pangaea and the opening history of the Northern Atlantic (and hence the Bay of Biscay).
- The movements of the microcontinent Iberia.

In the Upper Triassic (Carnian) about 230 million years ago, the supercontinent Pangaea started slowly to break up. In the Atlantic domain, the disintegration began in the area of the Central Atlantic. Already in the Lower Jurassic, the initial rifting process had given way to the marine drifting stage. In the Toarcian about 180 million years ago, the Central Atlantic was spreading and North America, South America and Africa were separating. By Callovian times, the Central Atlantic was fully marine. Spreading continued and gradually also began to affect the Northern Atlantic domain. During the Tithonian about 150 million years ago, a rift arm infiltrated along today's continental margin of northwestern France. Consequently, Iberia, so far being positioned right below the Armorican Massif (Brittany), was wedged southward. This gave the Atlantic the chance to directly reach the Aquitaine Basin for the first time. In the wake of the southward drifting Iberia during the Lower Cretaceous, the Bay of Biscay opened up. The microcontinent Iberia underwent in addition to its southward drifting motion a counterclockwise rotational movement that eventually brought it in close contact with southern France (reflected in first tectonic movements in the Pyrenees during the Albian; also documented by metamorphism in the Pyrenees dated between 108 and 93 million years ago and by the transgression of the Cenomanian sea). The final collision happened during the Eocene/Oligocene uplifting the mountain chain and subjecting it to severe erosion at the same time. The main phase of uplift ended with the close of the Aquitanian, followed mainly by isostatic movements lasting to this day.

=== Megasequences ===
By taking as a reference point the onset of rifting in the Bay of Biscay during the Tithonian the geodynamic evolution of the Aquitaine Basin can be subdivided into four megasequences (somewhat simplified):

- Prerift megasequence. Triassic till Upper Jurassic. Mainly clastic sediments and carbonates followed by thick evaporites during the Triassic; shelf carbonates during the Jurassic.
- Synrift megasequence. Lower Cretaceous (Tithonian till Albian). The Bay of Biscay opened and became partially underlain by oceanic crust. During the Neocomian nonmarine and shallow-marine clastics and carbonates formed, followed by thick shelf carbonates during the Aptian and Albian. The megasequence ends in the Cenomanian with inversion tectonics along preexisting tensional faults.
- Postrift megasequence. Cenomanian till Paleocene. Sinistral motions of Iberia relative to France created several transtensional sub-basins (pull-apart structures). Turbidite sedimentation in the south.
- Foreland basin megasequence. Eocene till recent. The collision of Iberia with France in the Eocene terminated the transtensional tectonics. The rising orogen of the Pyrenees shed flysch sediments during the Eocene and molasses during the Miocene into the foreland basin.

== Resources ==
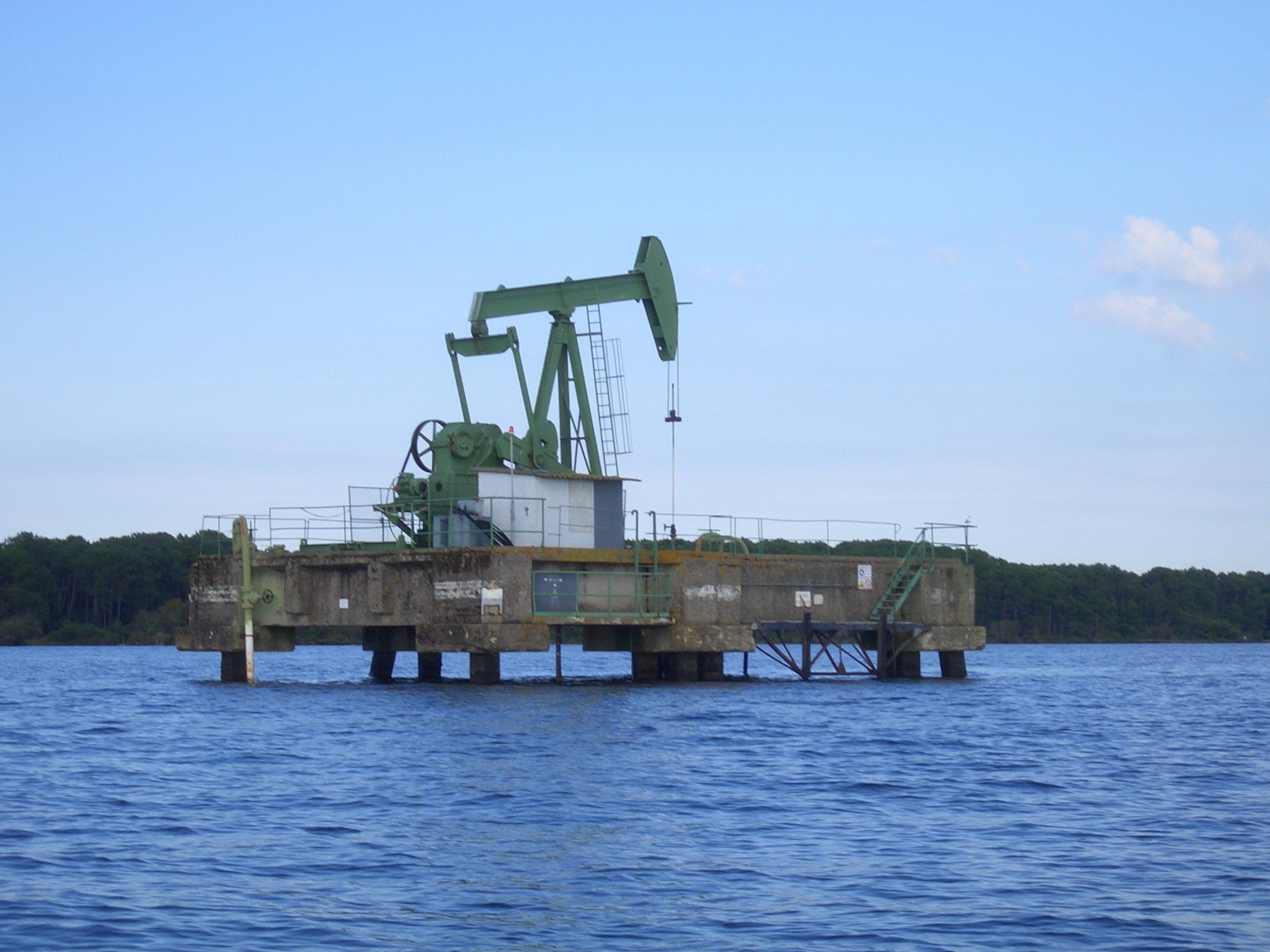
Oil pumping station on the Étang de Biscarosse near Parentis-en-Born

=== Hydrocarbons ===
Amongst the many resources in the Aquitaine Basin, the hydrocarbons oil and gas are without doubt of prime importance for the French economy. Major sources are found in the following sub-basins of Lower Cretaceous age:

- In the Parentis Basin. Oil is found in Parentis, Cazaux and Lavergne. The Parentis Basin contains most oil reserves of continental France.
- In the Adour Basin. Gas is found in Lacq gas field, Meillon, and Saint-Marcet. With its 220 billion cubic meters of gas, the Adour Basin stocks practically all the gas reserves of France.

Source/host rocks are Jurassic (Kimmeridgian) and Lower Cretaceous limestones and dolomites. Lower Aptian shales function as seals.

=== Groundwater aquifers ===
Classic groundwater aquifers are found in Upper Cretaceous and Cenozoic rocks of the Bordelais. Recently a gigantic aquifer has been discovered in Eocene sands near Lussagnet—of great importance for the region Pau-Toulouse.

=== Other resources ===
Further notable resources include:

- Clays and mudstones. They are the raw material for innumerable tile and brick factories (manufacture of tiles, bricks, terracotta, etc.). Horizons are found mainly in the Toarcian, in the Eocene (Lutetian), in the Oligocene, and in the Miocene (Aquitanian, Burdigalian, Langhian, and Tortonian).
- Kaolinite. This is the raw material for the manufacture of china. Mainly found in residual pockets of Eocene age filling depressions and caves in Upper Cretaceous karst developments. For example, near Les Eyzies.
- Peat. Pleistocene and Holocene horizons in the Médoc (Gironde estuary).
- Lignite. In the Cenomanian of the Sarladais; Upper Miocene/Pliocene deposits in the Landes are strip-mined near Arjuzanx.
- Bauxite. In Jurassic karst pockets between Pech and Lavelanet. Economically not viable.
- Iron. Contained within the Eocene age Sidérolithique, mainly in the Périgord and in the Quercy. Economically no longer viable.
- Metals. Mainly lead-zinc mineralisations occurring in the basal Sinemurian. Found in the Charente and near Figeac, yet economically no longer viable.
- Wood. Large forests in the Landes and in the Dordogne form the basis for a diversified industry (firewood for power stations and private use, charcoal, palettes, timber, furniture industry, etc.).
- Fruits. Plums in the Agenais (Pruneau d'Agen).
- Wine. World-famous wines like the Cognac, Bordeaux, Armagnac, Chalosse, and Béarn are grown in the Aquitaine Basin.

== Conclusions ==
The structural and hence sedimentary organisation in the Aquitaine Basin was ultimately influenced by two principal factors:

- By structural inheritance from the Variscan basement.
- By the evolution of the Pyrenean orogen.

The strong northwest-southeast-striking tectono-metamorphic zonation in the basement has profoundly influenced the structural and the sedimentary evolution of the Aquitaine Basin. The same hercynian direction is also followed by the continental edge of northwestern France which formed during the evolution of the Bay of Biscay. The continental edge finds its prolongation in the superdeep Subpyrenean Basin. The system of anticlinal ridges affecting the sedimentary cover is also arranged in this direction. The prominent South Armorican Shear Zone farther north also strikes northwest–southeast, but additionally has a distinct dextral wrenching movement. Like the South Armorican Shear Zone, the anticlinal ridges too are affected by similar shearing movements and are not purely compressional in origin. Even the Paris Basin is bounded by these transtensional dextral shear zones and can hence be interpreted as an east–west-oriented pull-apart basin. Within the context of the opening of the Bay of Biscay, the Parentis Basin can furthermore be regarded as a failed attempt of the Atlantic to wedge into the continent's interior. The reason for this is the counterclockwise rotational motion of Iberia blocked further rifting.

Since the Cenomanian, the Aquitaine Basin is under the influence of the Pyrenean orogeny with its west-northwest-east-southeast-striking structural grain. The Pyrenean orogen likewise has not merely a compressional origin but also a strong, in this case, sinistral transtensional component. The Pyrenean orogen exerted a very profound influence upon the Aquitaine Basin up to this day, subjecting it not only to more or less north–south-directed compression but also to transtension. The effects were of a penetrative nature—tectonic repercussions of the Pyrenean orogeny can even be seen at the northeastern basin margin in the immediate vicinity of the Massif Central.
