= Gravesia =

Gravesia may refer to:

- Gravesia (ammonite), an extinct genus of ammonites in the family Aulacostephanidae
- Gravesia (plant), a genus of plants in the family Melastomataceae
