= Jonzac thermal springs =

French underground hot springs

The Jonzac thermal springs are hot springs in Jonzac, France. They are located 1,800 metres (5,900 ft) meters underground and since their discovery in 1979, the spring waters have fed a thermal spa located in Jonzac.

== History ==
Rainwater started seeping into the ground 30,000 years ago, between the Massif Central and the edge of the Massif Armoricain. During this process, these rainwaters journeyed through various layers formed of dolomites, sandstone, and clays. The waters warmed and absorbed minerals as they descended into the Trias aquifer in the north of the Aquitaine Basin. This water was discovered in 1979 when the town of Jonzac was drilling the ground to expand its geothermal heating system. The Jonzac spa opened in 1986.

== Water composition ==
Water temperature at the source: 62 °C

Dry extract at 18.0 °C: 6 717.7 mg/l

pH: 7.04

=== Cations per mg/liter ===
- Sodium: 1,730.00
- Potassium: 135.00
- Calcium: 413.00
- Magnesium: 85.00
- Ammonium: 1.00
- Iron: 5.54

=== Anions per mg/liter ===
- Carbonate: 0.15
- Bicarbonate: 234.48
- Chloride: 2,020.00
- Sulfate: 2,165.00
- Nitrite: <0.01
- Phosphate: <0.01
- Nitrate: <0.01
- Silica: 27.85

=== Trace elements per mg/liter ===
- Zinc: <0.001
- Strontium: 13.50
- Bromine: 1.900
- Lithium: 2.200
- Fluoride: 2.00
