= Lacq gas field =

Natural gas field in Nouvelle-Acquitaine, France

Coordinates: 43.4106°N 0.6347°W

Lacq
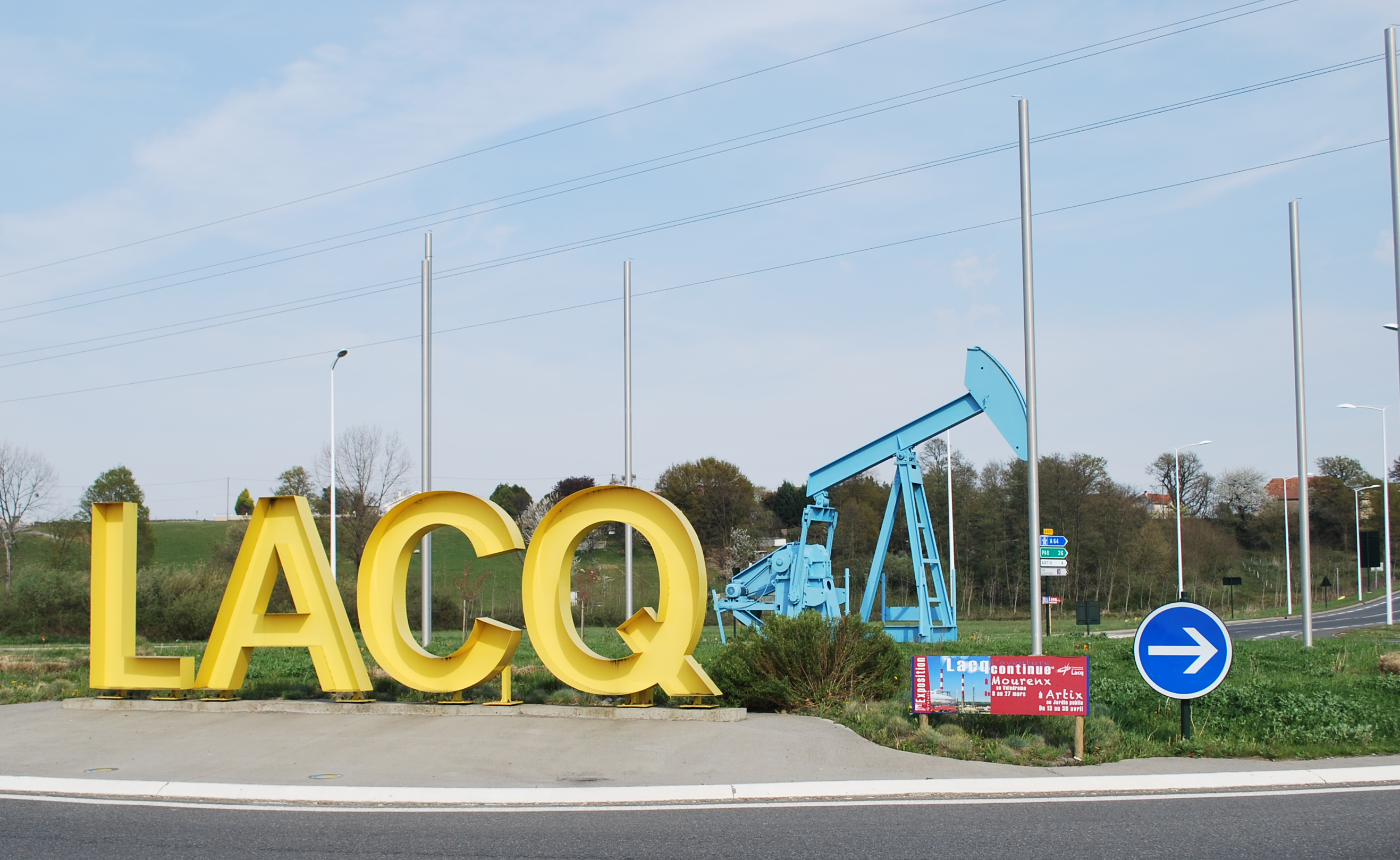
- Country: France
- Region: Aquitaine
- Offshore/onshore: onshore
- Operator: Total S.A.

Field history
- Discovery: 1950
- Start of production: 1958

Production
- Current production of gas: 35×10^{6} m^{3}/d 1,000×10^{6} cu ft/d 3.65×10^{9} m^{3}/a (129×10^{9} cu ft/a)
- Estimated gas in place: 251×10^{9} m^{3} 8.8×10^{12} cu ft

The Lacq gas field is a natural gas field located in Nouvelle-Aquitaine. Discovered in 1950, it was developed by Total S.A., determining it to have initial total proven reserves of the Lacq gas field are around 8.8 trillion ft^{3} (251 km^{3}). It began production of natural gas and condensates in 1958, with a production rate of around 1 billion ft^{3}/day (35×10^{5} m^{3}).

== Geology ==
The Lacq Gas Field is a structural trap located in an anticline which formed in the southern part of Aquitaine Basin starting in the Cretaceous until the Tertiary with the Arzacq syncline to the north and the Eocene flysch trough in front of the Pyrenees foothills to the south. The field is 16 km long and 10 km wide with oil produced beneath a Tertiary unconformity at 700 m and a hydrosulfuric gas beneath a pre-Cretaceous unconformity at about 4000 m. The anticline was identified with two exploration geophysics electric lines in 1943 and a magnetotelluric survey in 1943, a gravimetric survey in 1944 and a reflection seismology survey in 1947, which led to the Lacq No. 1 well in 1949. The stratigraphic column begins with the Lower Jurassic Liassic at about 4700 m followed by the Late Jurassic Dogger, the gas producing dolomite in the Portland Group, Purbeckian-Waeldian sandstone, and Valanginian-Neocomian limestone and dolomite, followed by the Albian-Aptian marls and limestones.
