= Pinch-out =

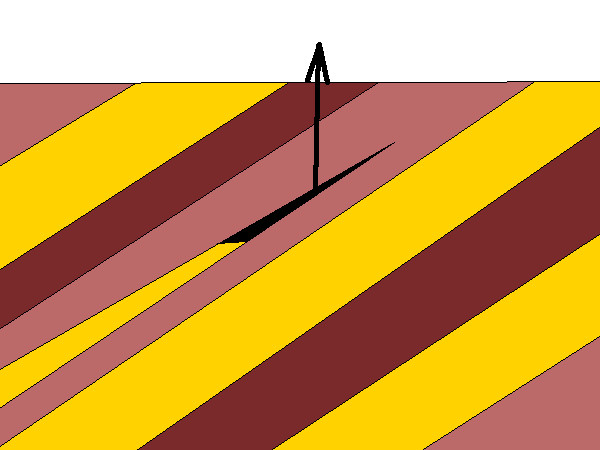
Diagram illustrating a pinch-out petroleum trap

A pinch-out or wedge-out is a point where a stratum or other lithologically distinct body of rock thins to a feather edge and disappears, so that the underlying and overlying strata separated by the pinching out stratum come into direct contact. The term also is used in petroleum geology to describe a stratigraphic trap created by a pinch-out. Petroleum migrating through a porous stratum is trapped where the stratum pinches out between impermeable underlying and overlying strata.

As of 2019, at least 20 oil fields containing reserves of 6-7 billion barrels of petroleum are thought to be a result of pinch-out of turbidite beds.

A pinch-out is distinct from a shale-out, which is a structural trap formed when a porous bed grades laterally into impermeable shale without the bed actually pinching out.
