= Alveolinella =

Alveolinella Temporal range: Miocene - Rec.

Scientific classification
- Domain: Eukaryota
- Clade: Sar
- Clade: Rhizaria
- Phylum: Retaria
- Subphylum: Foraminifera
- Class: Tubothalamea
- Order: Miliolida
- Family: Alveolinidae
- Genus: Alveolinella; Douville, 1906

Genus of single-celled organisms

Alveolinella is a genus of larger fusiform porcelaneous alveolinids from the Miocene to Recent with apertures on the septal face in multiple rows and aligned partitions (septula) dividing the primary chambers. Aveolinella is a larger foraminifer from the milioline family Alveolinidae. Like other miliolines, they have imperforate porcelaneous walls.

In the Pacific Ocean Alveolinella is found between water depths of 10 to 80 m, often associated with other miliolids, in carbonate areas of warm tropical seas. Its nearest living relative is the genus Borelis de Montfort.
