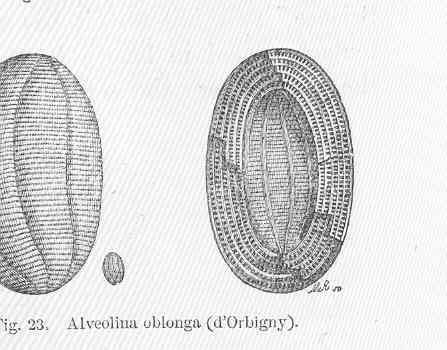
- Alveolina oblonga

Scientific classification
- Domain: Eukaryota
- Clade: Sar
- Clade: Rhizaria
- Phylum: Retaria
- Subphylum: Foraminifera
- Class: Tubothalamea
- Order: Miliolida
- Family: Alveolinidae
- Genus: †Alveolina d'Orbigny, 1826

Type species
- †Alveolina boscii (Defrance in Bronn, 1825)

= Alveolina =

Extinct genus of single-celled organisms

Alveolina is an extinct genus of foraminifera with an elliptical or spherical form.
