= Champagné-Saint-Hilaire =

- Commune
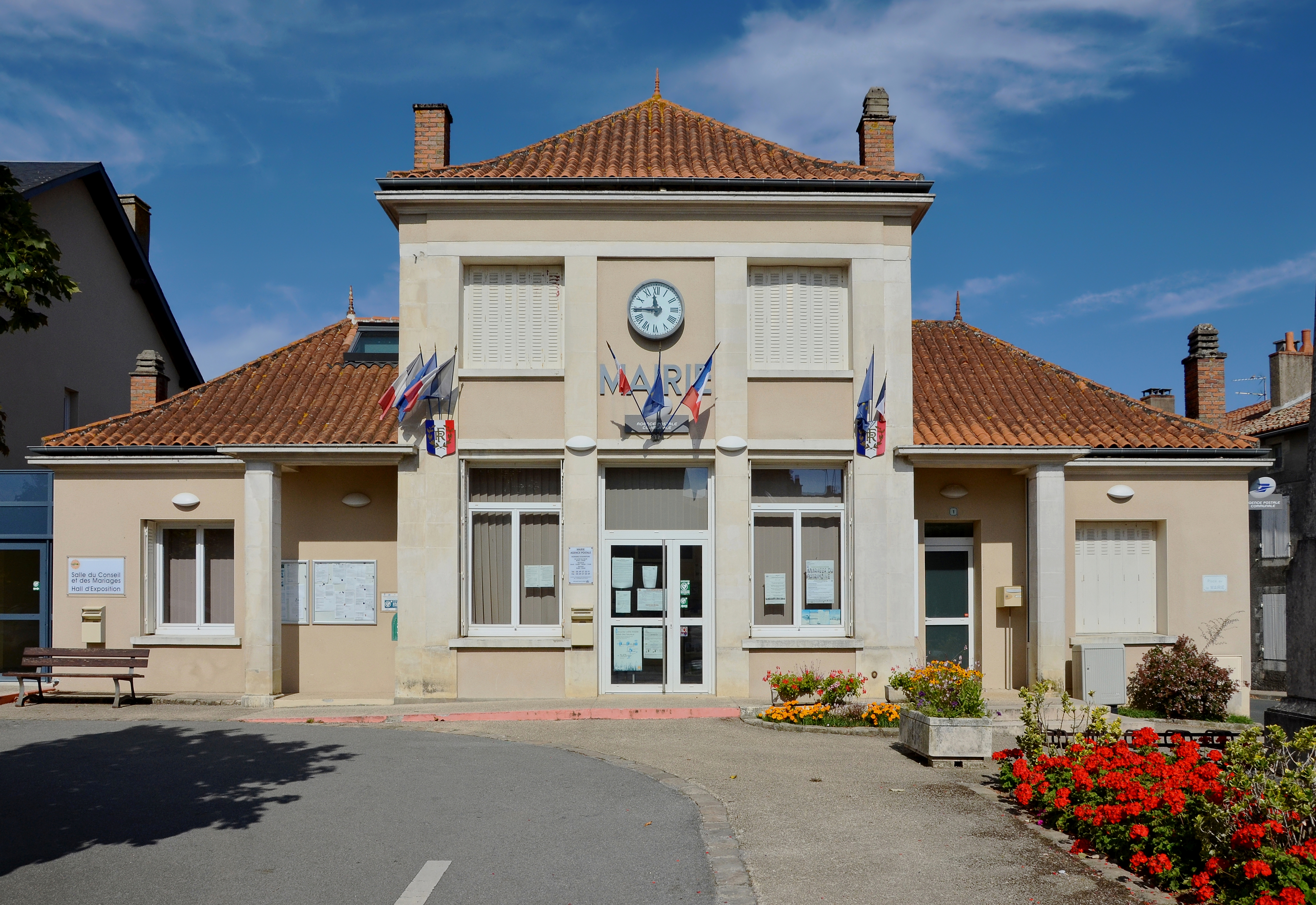
- The town hall in Champagné-Saint-Hilaire
- Location of Champagné-Saint-Hilaire
- Location within France Location within Nouvelle-Aquitaine
- Coordinates: 46°19′14″N 0°19′30″E
- Country: France
- Region: Nouvelle-Aquitaine
- Department: Vienne
- Arrondissement: Montmorillon
- Canton: Civray

Government
  - Mayor (2020–2026): Gilles Bossebœuf
- Area^{1}: 46.36 km^{2} (17.90 sq mi)
- Elevation: 194 m (636 ft)
- Highest elevation: 195 m (640 ft)
- Lowest elevation: 99 m (325 ft)
- Population (2023): 998
  - Density: 21.5/km^{2} (55.8/sq mi)
- Time zone: UTC+01:00 (CET)
  - Summer (DST): UTC+02:00 (CEST)
- INSEE/Postal code: 86052 /86160
- ^{1} French Land Register data, which excludes lakes, ponds, glaciers > 1 km^{2} (0.386 sq mi or 247 acres) and river estuaries.

Champagné-Saint-Hilaire (French pronunciation: [ʃɑ̃paɲe sɛ̃.t‿ilɛʁ]) is a commune in the Vienne department in the Nouvelle-Aquitaine region in western France.

Champagné-Saint-Hilaire is located in the geographical area known as the seuil du Poitou. It is also the highest commune in the vicinity.

== See also ==
- Communes of the Vienne department
