= Seuil du Poitou =

Geological area in western central France

Coordinates: 46°22′N 0°17′E

The Seuil du Poitou (literally "Poitou's Threshold") is a geological denomination for an area in western central France where the Paris (Northeast) and Aquitaine (Southwest) sedimentary basins meet, and which also is a gap between the ancient mountain ranges Massif Armoricain (Northwest) and the Massif Central (Southeast).

Situated to the south of Poitiers, the area is the drainage divide between the Loire, Charente and Sèvre basins and a border between different climatic zones.

Maximum altitude on the Seuil du Poitou is 195 meters at Champagné-Saint-Hilaire.

Because it is a strategic way of access between the North and South of France, the area in or around the Seuil du Poitou has been the theater of many battles. In 732, the Battle of Tours took place some 50 km North of the Seuil du Poitou.
