= Caprock =

Rock overlying a less resistant type

Caprock or cap rock is a hard, resistant, and impermeable layer of rock that overlies and protects a layer of softer material. In petroleum geology the softer lower layer may be a reservoir of oil or natural gas. The caprock acts similarly to the crust on a pie where the crust (caprock) prevents leakage of the soft filling (softer material). In landforms like mesas and buttes, the caprock consists of sturdy erosion-resistant rock like granite or basalt that resists weathering more strongly than its supporting rock and results in differential erosion. It also influences hydrology by creating waterfalls and aquifers where the movement of water is restricted and channeled by the harder layers. As petroleum reservoirs caprocks are often buried under other layers of rock and protected from weathering, they can consist of softer materials like sandstone, limestone, and evaporites, as long as they are highly impermeable and resist the flow of hydrocarbons through them.

== Geological characteristics ==
Caprock is typically composed of erosion-resistant materials. Common caprock materials include strongly cemented sandstone, limestone, basalt, and evaporites like anhydrite, gypsum, or halite, which form over salt domes. The formation of caprock occurs through processes such as differential erosion, where resistant rocks remain as elevated features while softer rocks erode away; depositional processes, including chemical precipitation of volcanic activity; and diagenesis, where sediments transform into hard rock over geological time. These processes collectively create durable layers that shape landscapes and preserve subsurface resources.

== Environmental and economic importance ==
=== Influences on land formations ===
Caprock shapes landscapes by slowing erosion, creating features or formation types like mesas, buttes, and escarpments. However, when softer rock beneath the caprock erodes, the caprock can collapse, forming talus slopes at the base of cliffs. Caprock also shapes river systems by controlling erosion patterns, often creating waterfalls where its hardened layers are exposed. They can also act as aquifers, storing groundwater, while impermeable caprock layers can trap water, resulting in these aquifer formations. Additionally, caprock layers can affect land use and agriculture by influencing soil composition and water infiltration. In some regions, caprock covered areas have little to no vegetation due to a lack of water penetration into overlaying soil, limiting farming potential.

=== Hydrocarbon trapping (petroleum) ===
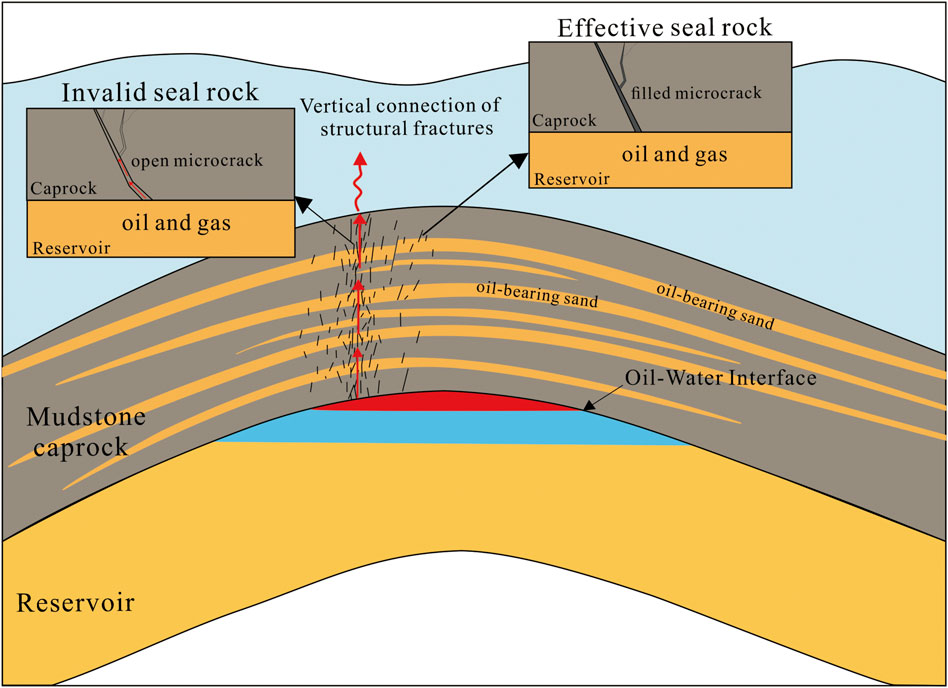
Schematic diagram of a micro-fracture in caprock. The fracture introduces microscopic pathways for gas, oil, and water to escape into overlaying spaces. This type of caprock fracture is typically caused by abnormally high pressures (e.g. tectonic extrusion or uplifting).

In the petroleum industry, caprock is any nonpermeable formation that may trap oil, gas or water, preventing it from migrating to the surface. This caprock can prevent hydrocarbons from migrating to the surface, allowing them to accumulate in a reservoir of oil and gas (petroleum). Effective caprock materials, such as shale, evaporites, and hardened carbonate rocks, prevent these resources from escaping. The efficiency of caprock in sealing hydrocarbons is influenced by several factors such as lithology, thickness, porosity, permeability, and mechanical properties. However, the sealing capacity of caprocks can be compromised by the presence of faults or fractures, which may act as pathways for hydrocarbon leakage. These structures, also known as petroleum traps, are a primary target for the petroleum industry.

== Notable caprock formations ==
=== Gulf of Mexico salt domes ===
Salt domes in the Gulf of Mexico form through diapirism. The buoyant salt layers (primarily Jurassic-aged Louann Salt) rise through overlying sediments due to density contrast and tectonic stress. As the salt migrates upward, it pierces and deforms younger layers of rock, creating traps for hydrocarbons and shaping the seafloor topography. The Gulf's passive margin setting, with thick sediment accumulation, promotes widespread salt tectonics, as seen in the Sigbee Escarpment. The salt domes are primarily made of halite and is removed first, leaving behind gypsum and anhydrite. The anhydrite and gypsum react with organic material to form calcite. The classic Murray 1966 paper describes the generalized sequence as sediments-calcite-gypsum-anhydrite-salt.

=== The Grand Canyon ===
The Grand Canyon is an example of how caprock influences erosion and landform development. Its layered rock formations include caprock layers such as sandstone and limestone, and shape the canyon's dramatic cliffs and plateaus like the Kaibab Limestone formation. Durable caprock layers slow erosion and preserve features, including mesas and buttes, while softer underlying rocks erode more quickly, creating the steep walls of the Grand Canyon. In some areas, the collapse of caprock is what forces the canyon's talus slopes. The flowing pathway of the Colorado River, cutting through the canyon, is also influenced by the hardened caprock layers. The caprock formations of the Grand Canyon are also known to trap water and form pockets of aquifers.

== See also ==
- Caprock Canyons State Park and Trailway
- Caprock Escarpment
- Hoodoo (geology)
- Karst
- Monadnock
