= Saint-Marcet =

- Commune
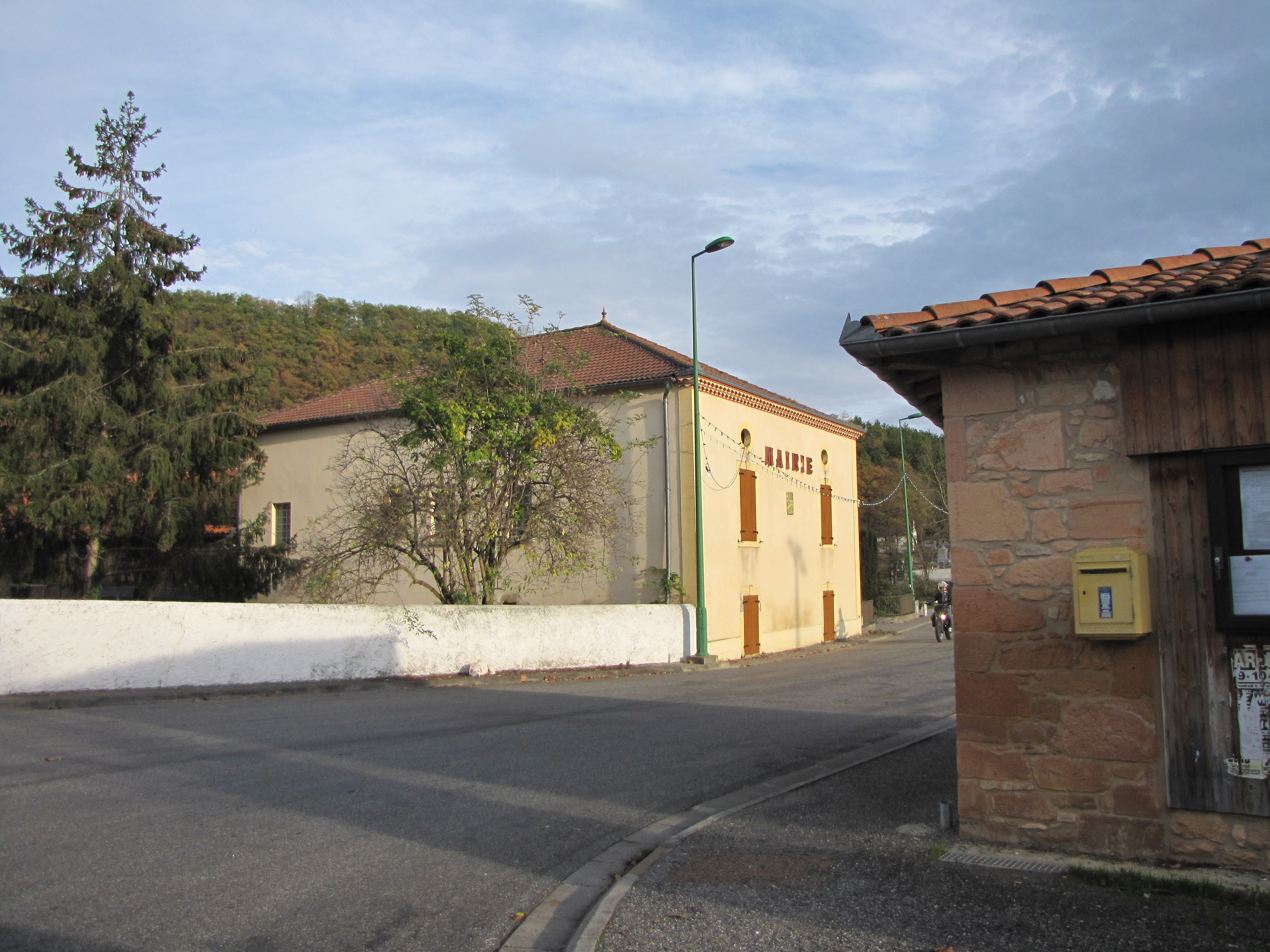
- The town hall in Saint-Marcet
- Location of Saint-Marcet
- Location within France Location within Occitanie
- Coordinates: 43°11′51″N 0°44′22″E
- Country: France
- Region: Occitania
- Department: Haute-Garonne
- Arrondissement: Saint-Gaudens
- Canton: Saint-Gaudens

Government
  - Mayor (2020–2026): Chantal Millet
- Area^{1}: 14.06 km^{2} (5.43 sq mi)
- Elevation: 410 m (1,350 ft)
- Highest elevation: 464 m (1,522 ft)
- Lowest elevation: 323 m (1,060 ft)
- Population (2023): 368
  - Density: 26.2/km^{2} (67.8/sq mi)
- Time zone: UTC+01:00 (CET)
  - Summer (DST): UTC+02:00 (CEST)
- INSEE/Postal code: 31502 /31800
- ^{1} French Land Register data, which excludes lakes, ponds, glaciers > 1 km^{2} (0.386 sq mi or 247 acres) and river estuaries.

Saint-Marcet is a commune in the Haute-Garonne department in southwestern France.

== Population ==
Historical population
Year	Pop.	±% p.a.
1968	401	—
1975	354	−1.77%
1982	348	−0.24%
1990	395	+1.60%
1999	393	−0.06%
2007	396	+0.10%
2012	392	−0.20%
2017	360	−1.69%
2023	368	+0.37%
Source: INSEE

== See also ==
- Communes of the Haute-Garonne department
