= Lavergne, Lot-et-Garonne =

Lavergne
- Commune
- Coat of arms
- Location of Lavergne
- Location within France Location within Nouvelle-Aquitaine
- Coordinates: 44°35′34″N 0°23′52″E
- Country: France
- Region: Nouvelle-Aquitaine
- Department: Lot-et-Garonne
- Arrondissement: Marmande
- Canton: Le Val du Dropt
- Intercommunality: CC Pays de Lauzun

Government
  - Mayor (2020–2026): Jacques Riemensberger
- Area^{1}: 19.96 km^{2} (7.71 sq mi)
- Elevation: 77 m (253 ft)
- Highest elevation: 127 m (417 ft)
- Lowest elevation: 47 m (154 ft)
- Population (2023): 554
  - Density: 27.8/km^{2} (71.9/sq mi)
- Time zone: UTC+01:00 (CET)
  - Summer (DST): UTC+02:00 (CEST)
- INSEE/Postal code: 47144 /47800
- ^{1} French Land Register data, which excludes lakes, ponds, glaciers > 1 km^{2} (0.386 sq mi or 247 acres) and river estuaries.

Lavergne is a commune in the Lot-et-Garonne department in the Nouvelle-Aquitaine region in south-western France.

== See also ==
- Communes of the Lot-et-Garonne department
