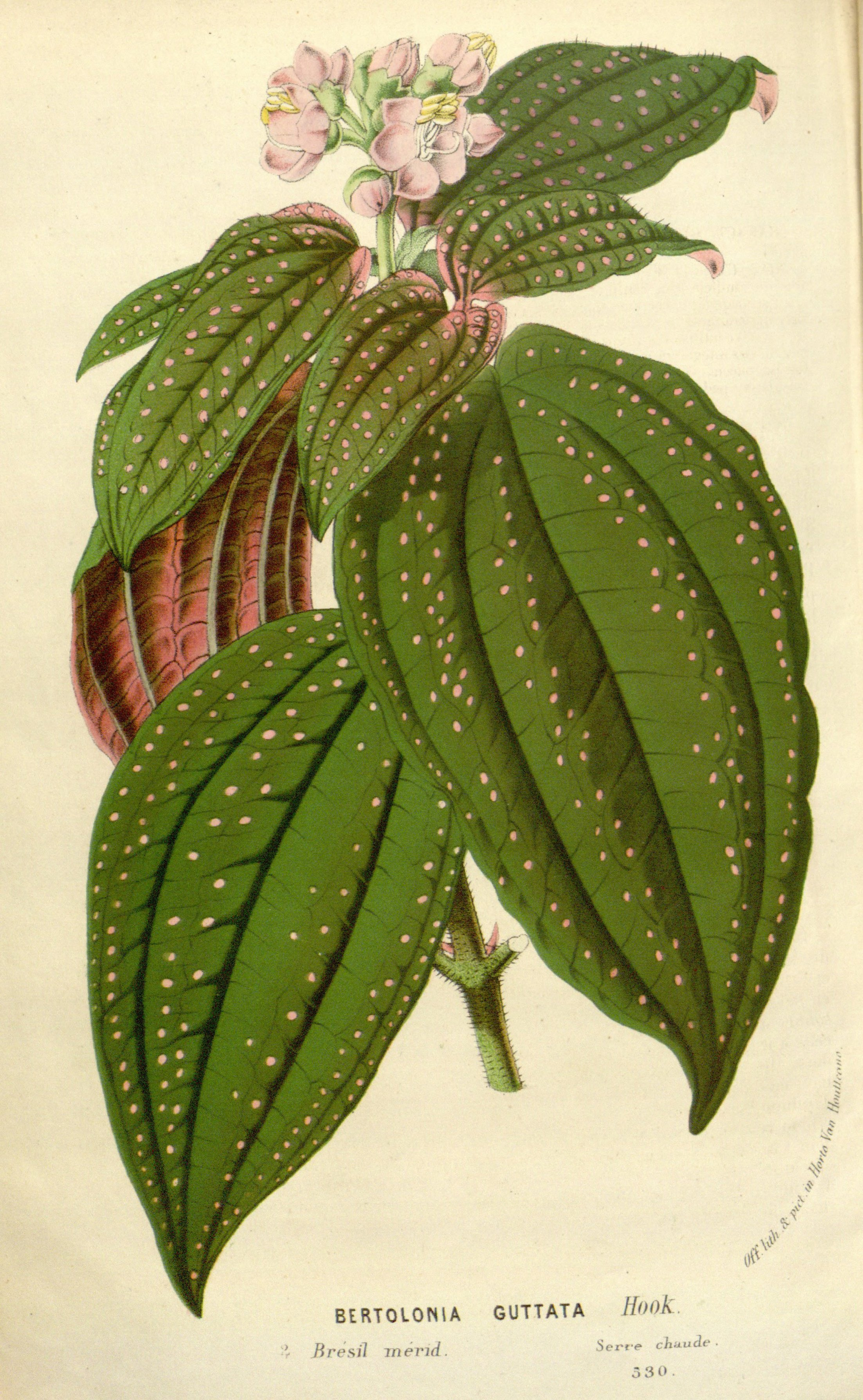
- Flore des serres v16 163a.

Scientific classification
- Kingdom: Plantae
- Clade: Tracheophytes
- Clade: Angiosperms
- Clade: Eudicots
- Clade: Rosids
- Order: Myrtales
- Family: Melastomataceae
- Genus: Gravesia; Naudin

Synonyms
- Neopetalonema Brenan; Orthogoneuron Gilg; Petalonema Gilg; Phornothamnus Baker; Urotheca Gilg; Veprecella Naudin

= Gravesia (plant) =

Genus of plants

Gravesia is a genus of flowering plants belonging to the family Melastomataceae.

Its native range is western central tropical Africa. It is found in the countries of Congo, Gabon, Madagascar, Tanzania and Zaire.

The genus name Gravesia is in honour of Louis Graves (1791–1857), French botanist, geologist and archaeologist and also director of waterways and forests in Oise in France. It was first described and published in Ann. Sci. Nat., Bot., séries 3, Vol.15 on page 333 in 1851.

== Known species ==
According to Kew;

- Gravesia aberrans H.Perrier
- Gravesia alata H.Perrier
- Gravesia albinervia Jum.
- Gravesia ambrensis H.Perrier
- Gravesia angustifolia Cogn.
- Gravesia angustisepala H.Perrier
- Gravesia antongiliana H.Perrier
- Gravesia apiculata (Cogn.) H.Perrier
- Gravesia barbata H.Perrier
- Gravesia baronii H.Perrier
- Gravesia bertolonioides Naudin
- Gravesia biauriculata H.Perrier
- Gravesia biporosa H.Perrier
- Gravesia bullosa (Cogn.) H.Perrier
- Gravesia calliantha Jum.
- Gravesia capitata H.Perrier
- Gravesia cauliflora H.Perrier
- Gravesia cistoides H.Perrier & H.Perrier
- Gravesia crassicauda H.Perrier
- Gravesia decaryana H.Perrier
- Gravesia dichaetantheroides H.Perrier & H.Perrier
- Gravesia dionychifolia H.Perrier
- Gravesia distantinervia Jum.
- Gravesia diversifolia H.Perrier
- Gravesia ecalcarata H.Perrier
- Gravesia elongata (Cogn.) H.Perrier
- Gravesia erecta H.Perrier
- Gravesia extenta Jum.
- Gravesia fulva H.Perrier
- Gravesia gabonensis Jacq.-Fél.
- Gravesia glandulosa H.Perrier
- Gravesia gunneroides H.Perrier
- Gravesia guttata Triana
- Gravesia hederoides H.Perrier
- Gravesia heterophylla Aug.DC.
- Gravesia hirtopetala H.Perrier
- Gravesia hispida (Baker) H.Perrier
- Gravesia humbertii H.Perrier
- Gravesia humblotii Cogn.
- Gravesia hylophila (Gilg) A.Fern. & R.Fern.
- Gravesia ikongoensis H.Perrier
- Gravesia inappendiculata H.Perrier
- Gravesia jumellei H.Perrier
- Gravesia lamiana H.Perrier
- Gravesia lanceolata (Cogn.) H.Perrier
- Gravesia laxiflora (Naudin) Drake
- Gravesia lebrunii Jacq.-Fél.
- Gravesia longifolia H.Perrier
- Gravesia longipes H.Perrier
- Gravesia lutea (Naudin) H.Perrier
- Gravesia macrantha Jum.
- Gravesia macrophylla (Naudin) Drake
- Gravesia macropoda (Jum. & H.Perrier) H.Perrier
- Gravesia macrosepala Jum.
- Gravesia magnifolia H.Perrier
- Gravesia malvacea Jum.
- Gravesia mangorensis Jum.
- Gravesia marojejyensis Humbert
- Gravesia masoalensis Jum.
- Gravesia medinilloides H.Perrier
- Gravesia microphylla (Cogn.) Drake
- Gravesia minutidentata H.Perrier & H.Perrier
- Gravesia mirabilis H.Perrier
- Gravesia nigrescens (Naudin) Drake
- Gravesia nigro-ferruginea H.Perrier
- Gravesia oblanceolata H.Perrier
- Gravesia oblongifolia (Cogn.) H.Perrier
- Gravesia parvifolia (A.DC.) H.Perrier
- Gravesia parvula Almeda & H.Ranariv.
- Gravesia pauciflora H.Perrier
- Gravesia pedunculata Triana
- Gravesia peltata H.Perrier
- Gravesia pilosula (Cogn.) Drake
- Gravesia porphyrovalvis Baker
- Gravesia primuloides Cogn.
- Gravesia pterocaulon H.Perrier
- Gravesia pulchra (Gilg) Jacq.-Fél. ex Wickens
- Gravesia pusilla Cogn.
- Gravesia pustulosa H.Perrier
- Gravesia ramosa Jum. & H.Perrier
- Gravesia reticulata Cogn.
- Gravesia retracticauda H.Perrier
- Gravesia rienanensis H.Perrier
- Gravesia riparia A.Fern. & R.Fern.
- Gravesia rosea (Cogn.) H.Perrier
- Gravesia rostrata H.Perrier & H.Perrier
- Gravesia rotundifolia H.Perrier
- Gravesia rubiginosa H.Perrier
- Gravesia rubra (Jum. & H.Perrier) H.Perrier
- Gravesia rubripes H.Perrier
- Gravesia rupicola H.Perrier
- Gravesia rutenbergiana Baill. ex Cogn.
- Gravesia sambiranensis H.Perrier
- Gravesia scandens H.Perrier
- Gravesia scripta H.Perrier
- Gravesia serpens H.Perrier
- Gravesia serratifolia Almeda & H.Ranariv.
- Gravesia setifera H.Perrier
- Gravesia stipulata H.Perrier
- Gravesia subglobosa H.Perrier
- Gravesia submalvacea H.Perrier
- Gravesia subsessilifolia H.Perrier
- Gravesia succosa H.Perrier
- Gravesia tanalensis H.Perrier
- Gravesia tetramera H.Perrier
- Gravesia tetraptera (Cogn.) H.Perrier
- Gravesia thymoides (Baker) H.Perrier
- Gravesia torrentium Jum.
- Gravesia tricaudata H.Perrier
- Gravesia variesetosa H.Perrier
- Gravesia velutina Jum.
- Gravesia venusta H.Perrier
- Gravesia vestita (Baker) H.Perrier
- Gravesia viguieri H.Perrier
- Gravesia violacea (Jum. & H.Perrier) H.Perrier
- Gravesia viscosa H.Perrier
