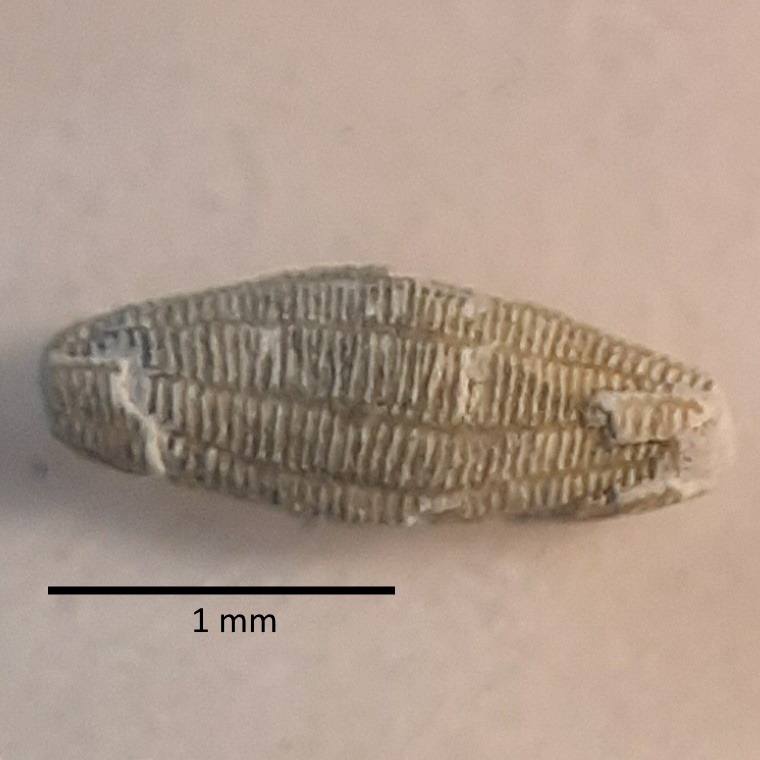
- Alveolina

Scientific classification
- Domain: Eukaryota
- Clade: Diaphoretickes
- Clade: Sar
- Clade: Rhizaria
- Phylum: Retaria
- Subphylum: Foraminifera
- Class: Tubothalamea
- Order: Miliolida
- Suborder: Miliolina
- Superfamily: Alveolinoidea
- Family: Alveolinidae; Ehrenberg, 1839

= Alveolinidae =

Alveolinidae Temporal range: Upper Cretaceous - Recent

Family of single-celled organisms

Alveolinidae is a family of spheroidal to fusiform milioline foraminifera with multiple apertures and complex interiors in which chambers are subdivided into chamberlets and subfloors interconnected by passageways. As with all Miliolina, the test wall in alveolinids is porcellaneous and imperforate. In living individuals the pseudopodia emerge through the multiple apertures that line the apertural or leading face of the test.

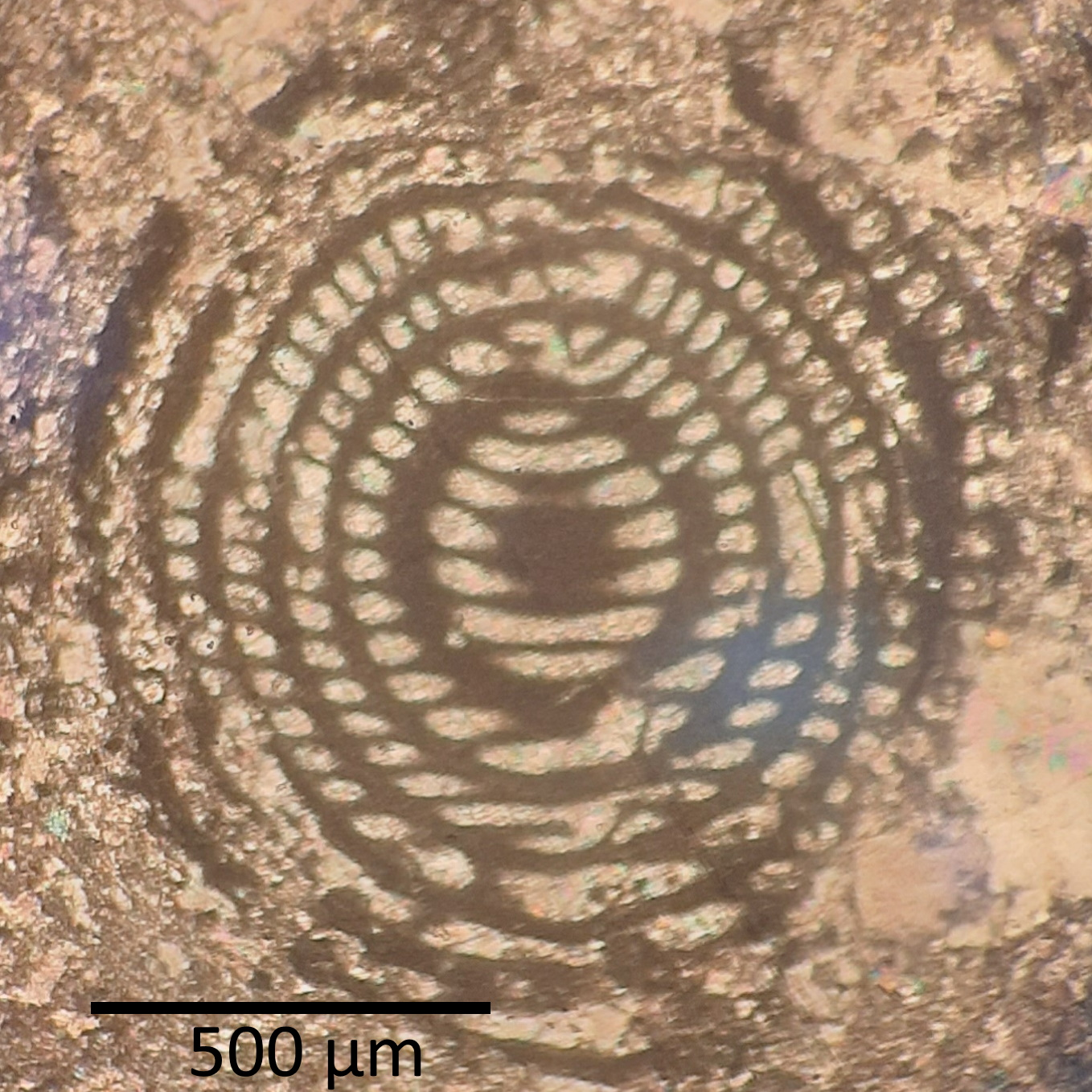
Alveolina cross-section

Alveolinids first appeared near the beginning of the Late Cretaceous, about 100 million years ago, some 150 million years after the superficially similar fusulinids became extinct at the end of the Permian.

Irregular coiling is found in the first volutions in the microspheric forms of most genera, indicating a close relationship with the Miliolidae. Alveolinella is an exception as the proloculus in the microspheric form is perforate and the first volutions are peneroplid in character, suggesting it, Alveolinella, may have a different origin than the other alveolinids.

== Genera ==
Genera accepted as of May 2025:

- Alveocella Piuz, Meister & Vicedo, 2014 †
- Alveolina d'Orbigny, 1826 †
- Alveolinella H. Douvillé, 1907
- Archaealveolina Fourcade, 1980 †
- Borelis Montfort, 1808
- Bullalveolina Reichel, 1936 †
- Caribalveolina Vicedo, Aguilar, Caus & Hottinger, 2009 †
- Cisalveolina Reichel, 1941 †
- Decastroia Vicedo & Serra-Kiel, 2011 †
- Fabalveolina Vicedo, Aguilar, Caus & Hottinger, 2009 †
- Flosculinella Schubert in Richarz, 1910 †
- Glomalveolina Hottinger, 1960 †
- Helenalveolina Hottinger, Drobne & Caus, 1989 †
- Multispirina Reichel, 1947 †
- Neomurciella Fleury & Fourcade, 1987 †
- Ovalveolina Reichel, 1936 †
- Praealveolina Reichel, 1933 †
- Praebullalveolina Sirel & Acar, 1982 †
- Quasiborelis Hanzawa, 1967 †
- Reichelia Vicedo & Piuz, 2016 †
- Senalveolina Fleury, 1984 †
- Simplalveolina Reichel, 1964 †
- Streptalveolina Fourcade, Tardy & Vila, 1975 †
- Subalveolina Reichel, 1936 †
