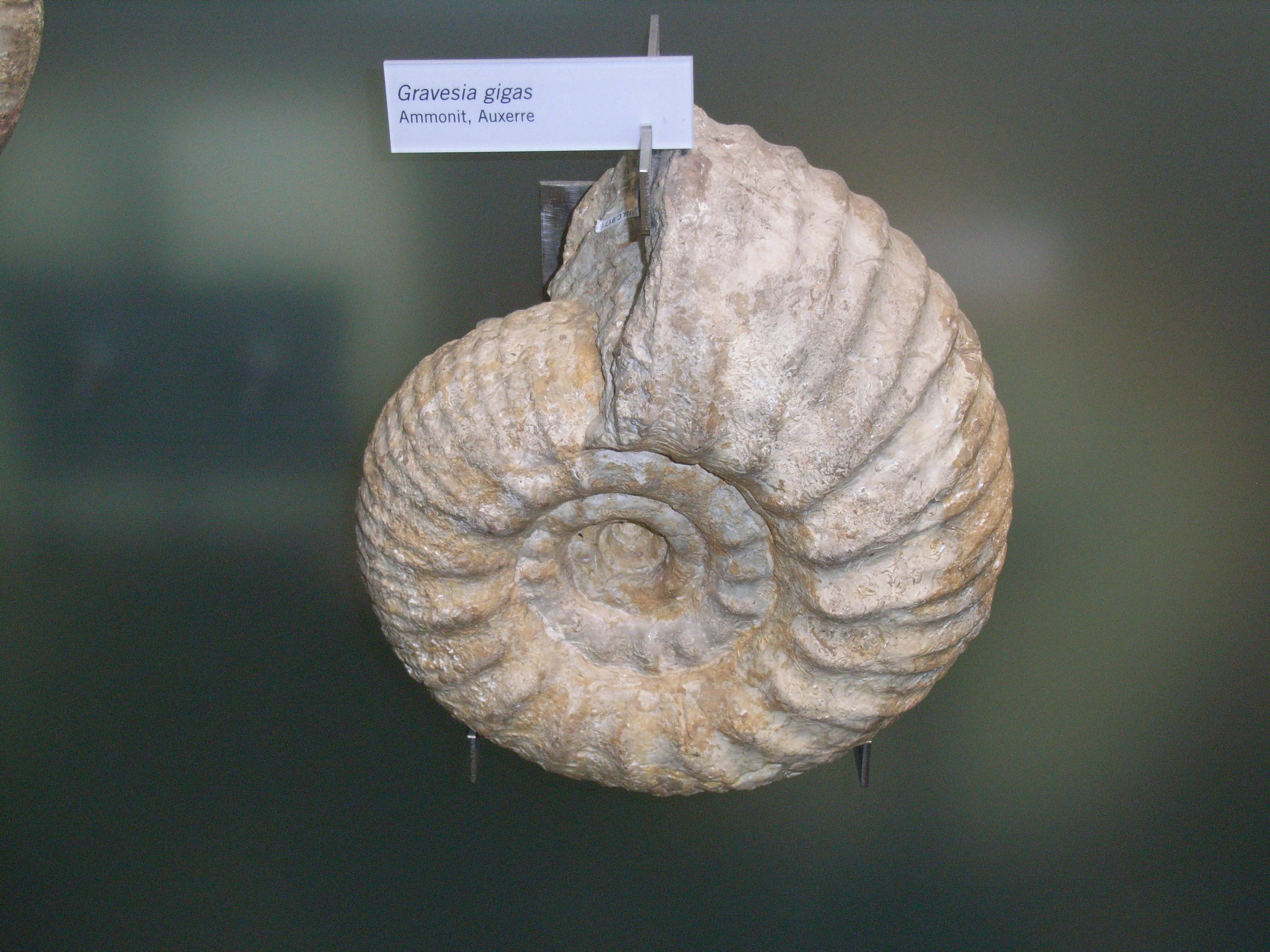
- Specimen of Gravesia gigas

Scientific classification
- Domain: Eukaryota
- Kingdom: Animalia
- Phylum: Mollusca
- Class: Cephalopoda
- Subclass: †Ammonoidea
- Order: †Ammonitida
- Superfamily: †Perisphinctoidea
- Genus: †Gravesia

= Gravesia (ammonite) =

Gravesia Temporal range: Kimmeridgian–Tithonian

Genus of molluscs (fossil)

Gravesia is an extinct genus of ammonite known from the Upper Jurassic (Kimmeridgian-Tithonian stages) of Europe.
