= Oceanisation =

Formation of an ocean after continental rifting

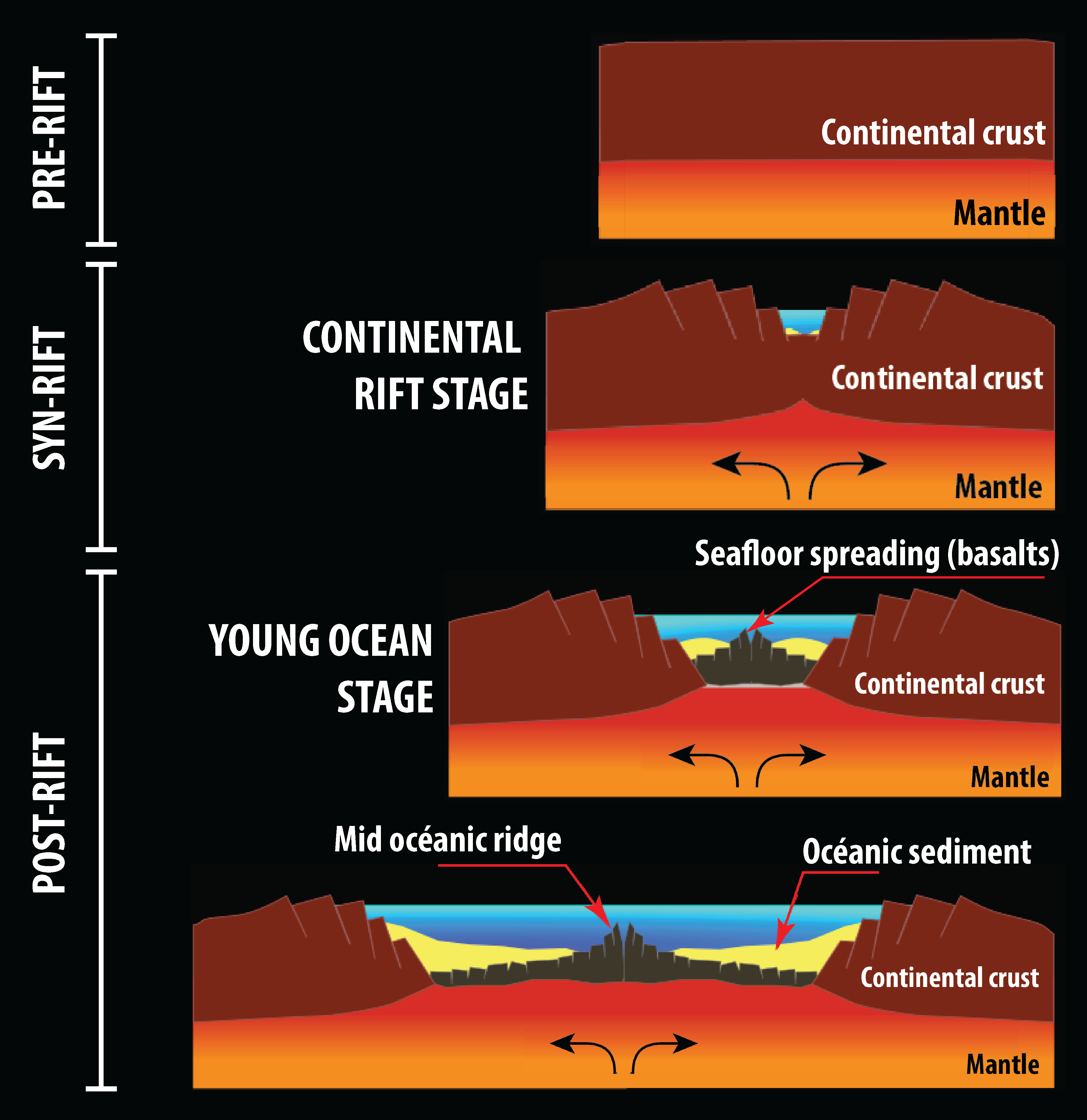
Stages of the oceanisation process through continental rifting

Oceanisation, or oceanization, is the process of formation of an ocean after continental rifting. The oceanisation is marked by the accretion of oceanic basalts between the drifting continental blocks and the incursion of marine waters and species in the rift basin. According to John Frederick Dewey in the 1960s the idea of continental drift was different from that of oceanisation which was "the mysterious metasomatism or transformation of continental crust into oceanic crust".
