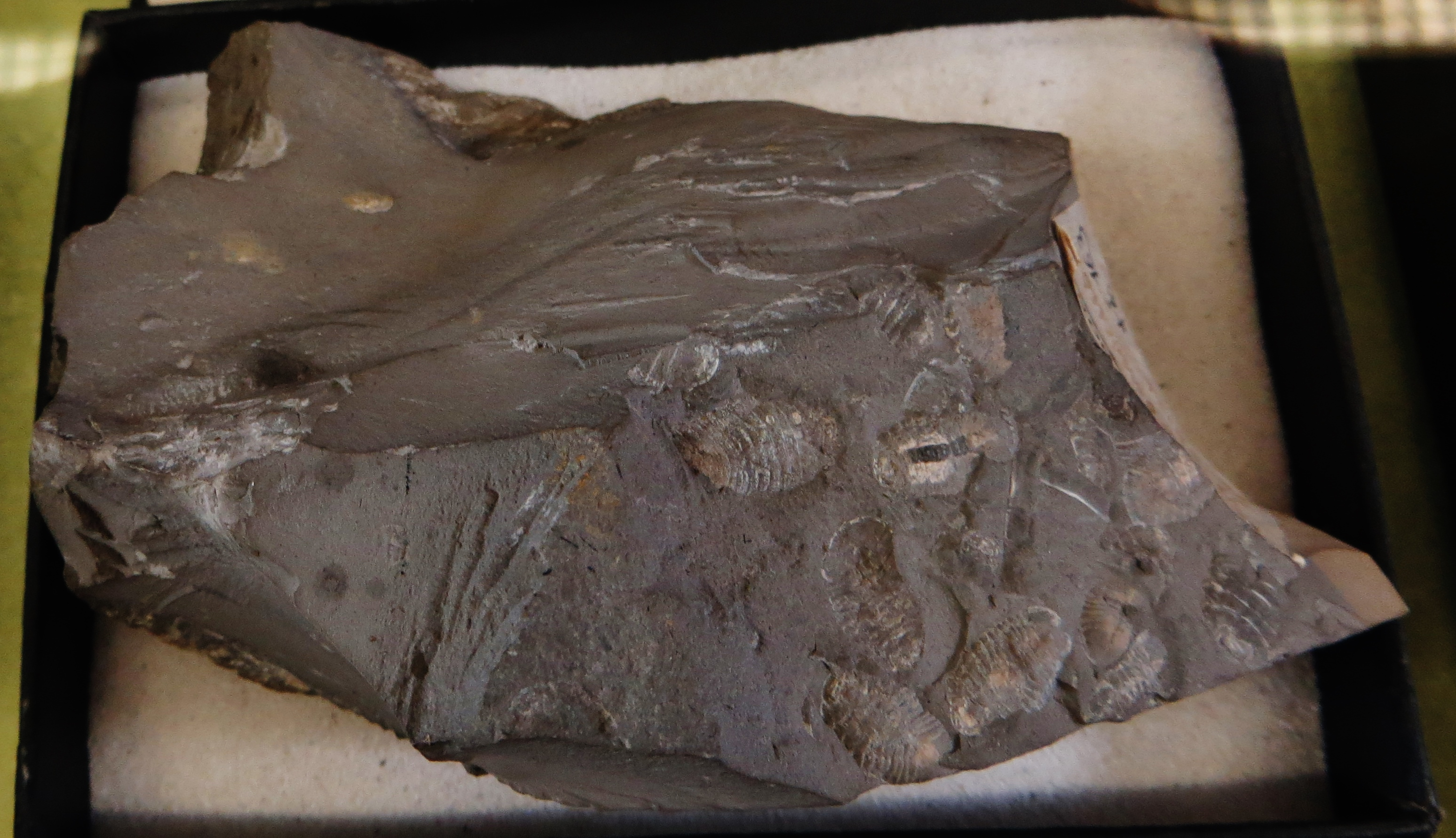
- Fossil of A. brodiei

Scientific classification
- Kingdom: Animalia
- Phylum: Arthropoda
- Clade: Pancrustacea
- Class: Malacostraca
- Superorder: Peracarida
- Order: Isopoda
- Suborder: Sphaeromatidea (?)
- Family: †Archaeoniscidae; Haack, 1918
- Genus: †Archaeoniscus; Milne-Edwards, 1843

Type species
- †Archaeoniscus brodiei Milne-Edwards, 1843

Species
- †A. brodiei Milne-Edwards, 1843; †A. edwardsii Westwood, 1854; †A.? texanus Wieder and Feldmann, 1992; †A. aranguthyorum Feldmann et al., 1998; †A. coreaensis Park et al., 2012; †A. italiensis Jones et al., 2014

= Archaeoniscus =

Archaeoniscus Temporal range: Bajocian–Albian

Extinct genus of crustaceans

Archaeoniscus (/ˌɑːrkiːˈoʊnɪskəs/) is a genus of prehistoric isopods that first appeared during the Bajocian stage of the Middle Jurassic. It is a widespread genus with a paleogeographic distribution encompassing the continental margin environments of the central Atlantic Ocean and the western Tethys Ocean. Fossils of Archaeoniscus suggest that this genus lived in diverse aquatic habitats, including the marine, paralic, and freshwater environments. While earlier descriptions suggested that it may have had an ectoparasitic association with fishes, some researchers argue that at least two species, A. aranguthyorum and A. coreaensis, lived a benthic free-living lifestyle based on morphological characteristics that are either unsuitable for or unrelated to parasitic behavior.

Six species have been named: two species are known from the Jurassic period rocks in Europe, and the other four are known from the Cretaceous period rocks in Europe, North America and East Asia. Of these species, the taxonomic position of the only Late Cretaceous species, A. texanus, is uncertain, for some researchers claim that this species should be neglected because of the significant morphological differences in comparison to the other species within the genus. Some specimens of the most completely known species, A. aranguthyorum, suggest that the female individuals of this species possibly had brood pouches, indicating that the genus may have had sexual dimorphism. An alternative interpretation suggests that the brood pouches may actually be the impressions of the hindgut and anus. Additionally, two unnamed indeterminate species are known from the Early Cretaceous rocks in Mexico and Egypt.

== Discovery ==
Reverend Peter Bellinger Brodie first discovered the crustacean fossils from the Purbeck Group in the Vale of Wardour, England. He asked Henri Milne-Edwards to examine some specimens and formally describe them. The specimens sent to Milne-Edwards measured 9–12 cm (3.5–4.7 in) in length, though other descriptions indicate their lengths were about 2.4 cm (0.94 in). Brodie claimed that he also found larger specimens that are about the size of small trilobites. Milne-Edwards identified that the specimens belong to an order Isopoda, and suggested that it may belong within the range of a family Cymothoidae, possibly an intermediate species between Serolis and Cymothoa. In 1843, Milne-Edwards proposed a genus name Archaeoniscus and a species name A. brodiei in honor of the discoverer Rev. P. B. Brodie. From the same lithostratigraphic group, Charles Willcox collected various insect fossils and sent them to John O. Westwood. Upon his examination, Westwood found several isopod specimens which varied in size, being either equal to or larger than A. brodiei. Westwood considered them to be a new species of Archaeoniscus, so he designated these specimens under a new species name A. edwardsii in honor of Milne-Edwards. While A. brodiei is discovered from the Late Jurassic-Early Cretaceous (Oxfordian-Berriasian) strata in England, France and Germany, A. edwardsii is only discovered from the Early Cretaceous (Berriasian) strata in England, though both species may be synonymous.

In 1918, Wilhelm Haack erected a monotypic family Archaeoniscidae and claimed that it is distinct from the suborder Oniscidea based on the large pleotelson, the shapes of antennulae, antennae and uropods. In 1992, Robert W. Wieder and Rodney M. Feldmann examined various isopod fossils from Austin Chalk in Texas, United States. Of these fossils, Wieder and Feldmann considered some specimens that are only known from posterior exuviae to belong to Archaeoniscus based on the raised axial node on the pleotelson which they claim to be distinct from almost every other known isopod species. Although they tentatively referred these specimens under a new species name, A. texanus, they acknowledged that the taxonomic placement of these specimens is difficult; still, they considered this placement prudent enough and better than erecting a new genus name and establishing the taxonomic affinities of the specimens. The stratigraphic age of Austin Chalk is during the Late Cretaceous (Coniacian-Santonian), so A. texanus is the youngest known species of this genus.

In 1998, Feldmann and his colleagues described a new species, A. aranguthyorum, which was discovered from the Tlayúa Formation in Mexico. In 2012, Park and his colleagues described a new freshwater-living species, A. coreaensis, which was discovered from the Jinju Formation in South Korea. Both species, A. aranguthyorum and A. coreaensis, lived during the Early Cretaceous (Albian). In 2014, a new species, A. italiensis, was discovered from the Monte Fallano Plattenkalk, Italy. Within the genus, A. italiensis is the oldest known species that lived during the Middle Jurassic (Bajocian-Bathonian). Unnamed Early Cretaceous species have been discovered from the Valanginian-Hauterivian stage rocks in Mexico and from the Albian stage rocks in Egypt.

== Description ==
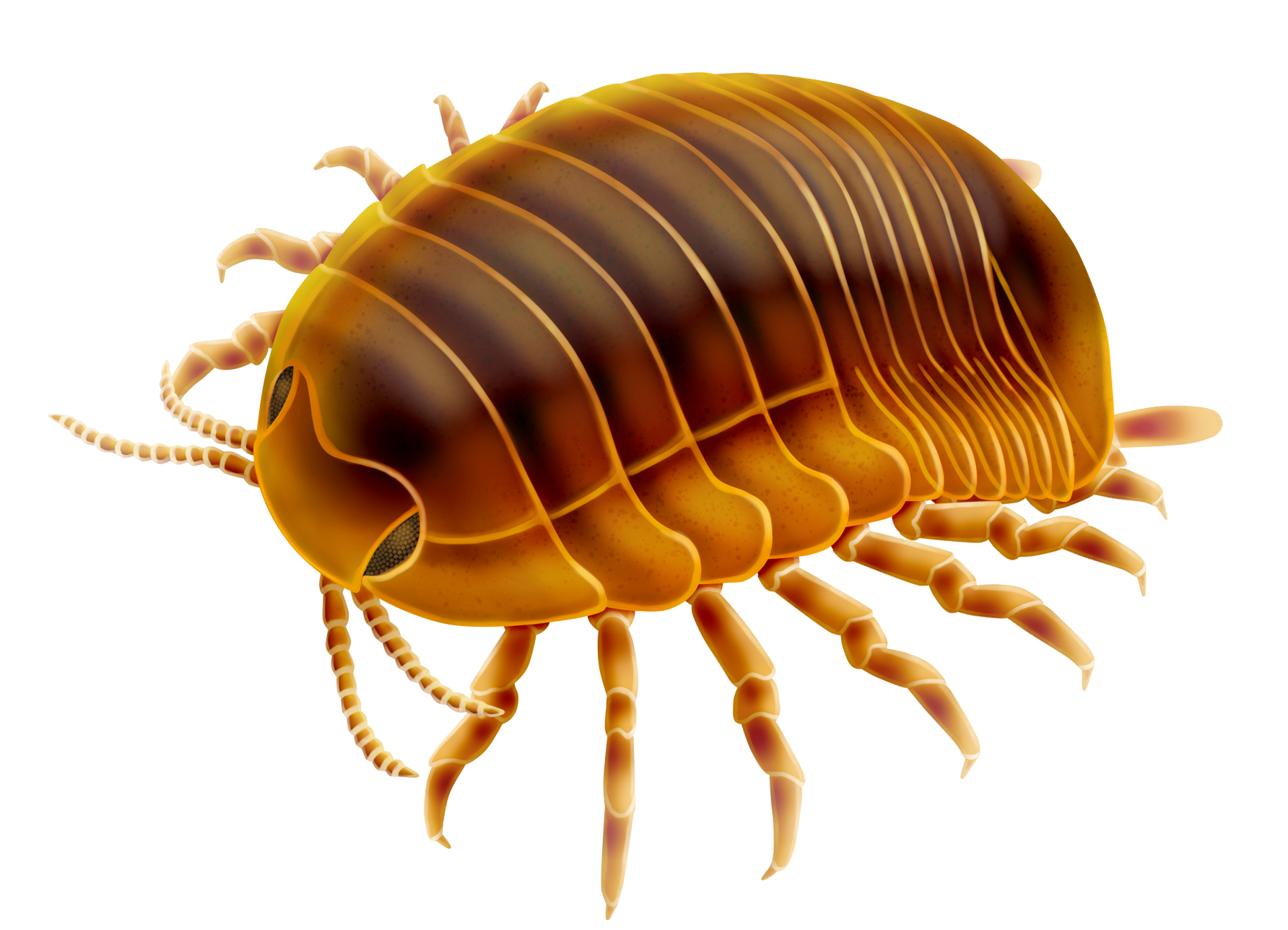
Speculative life restoration of Archaeoniscus coreaensis

Archaeoniscus generally has an oval-shaped body which is dorsoventrally compressed. The lateral margins of the pereion (the thorax of crustaceans) consist of broad, overlapping coxal plates with distinguishable sutures. The head is embedded into the first pereonite (the first segment of the pereion); it also possesses mandibles positioned transversely with a broad incisor process and has globular eyes on its lateral margin. The four anterior pleonites (parts of the abdomen of crustaceans called pleon) are long and wide, while the fifth pleonite is relatively reduced and does not extend to the lateral margin. Archaeoniscus lacks marginal spines on its broad and semicircular pleotelson, the structure formed by the fusion of the last abdominal segment of an arthropod and its telson. The unmodified ambulatory pereiopods have distinct coxal dorsal articulations, which are distinguishable from modern cymothoids, suggesting that the genus was not suited for ectoparasitic behavior. The antennulae is large and multiarticulate, and the spine-like uropodal rami have a narrow, parallel-sided protopod. A. texanus has significant morphological differences in comparison to other species within this genus, including the presence of a long fifth pleonite, triangular epimeres, shorter pleotelson and more robust uropod.

== Classification ==
Archaeoniscus, initially described as a possible cymothoid and now contained in its own monotypic family Archaeoniscidae, has an unclear phylogenetic position within the order Isopoda. This controversial classification may have occurred because the earlier studies have misinterpreted the anatomical characteristics of Archaeoniscus, such as the reconstructions provided by Haack in 1918 and by Vega and his colleagues in 2005, and the morphological data of this genus is insufficient for a definitive suprafamilial classification. In 1969, Robert R. Hessler argued that some features of this genus resemble those of the suborder Oniscidea, but acknowledged that the features noted by Haack in 1918 does distinguish the genus from that suborder. Although it was commonly placed within the suborder Flabellifera, this view has been disputed since 1989 by Johann Wolfgang Wägele. In 1998, Feldmann and his colleagues claimed that possible brood pouches found in some specimens of A. aranguthyorum may indicate that Archaeoniscus might belong to the suborder Sphaeromatidea; they assumed that the presence of brood pouch is a characteristic only observed in female sphaeromatid isopods. Following this suggestion, Vega and his colleagues in 2005 placed this genus within the superfamily Sphaeromatoidea of the suborder Sphaeromatidea. However, Brandt and his colleagues in 2003 did not consider the genus within the suborder Sphaeromatidea, but considered it to be an ancestral taxon of terrestrial isopods without specific reasoning behind their argument. In 2012, Park and his colleagues argued that Feldmann and his colleagues have mistaken the impressions of the hindgut and anus of A. aranguthyorum as possible brood pouches and that all female isopods have brood pouches, and thus the taxonomic position of this genus is still unclear. They also argued that A. texanus should be removed from the genus, as it significantly differs from other species, possessing flat limbs and five subequal pleonites with the fifth being the longest; in contrast, other species of Archaeoniscus possess narrow, rod-like limbs and only four free subequal pleonites with the fifth being reduced. Vega and his colleagues in 2019 also advocated the view that A. texanus is morphologically different from other species and that a new genus name should be erected for this species. They also considered that the latest occurrence of Archaeoniscus may more likely be the Albian stage of the Early Cretaceous.

== Paleobiology ==
As the earlier descriptions of this genus indicated a taxonomic association with cymothoids, Feldmann and his colleagues in 1998 considered that Archaeoniscus may have been ectoparasites on fishes just like modern cymothoids. Park and his colleagues in 2012 disagreed with this view, claiming that the morphological characteristics of A. aranguthyorum and A. coreaensis suggest otherwise. The researchers pointed out that the anterior limbs of Archaeoniscus are unmodified and ambulatory, contrary to those of modern cymothoids which resemble hooks. They also stated that the shape of the limbs and the flattened body resemble that of serolids or other sphaeromatids which live in benthic zones. Their interpretation suggests that at least two species of Archaeoniscus, A. aranguthyorum and A. coreaensis, likely lived a benthic lifestyle without any parasitic association with fishes. Additionally, while Feldmann and his colleagues suggested that Archaeoniscus had sexual dimorphism based on the possible existence of brood pouches, Park and his colleagues also disagreed with this claim, arguing that Feldmann and his colleagues misidentified the impressions of the hindgut and anus.
