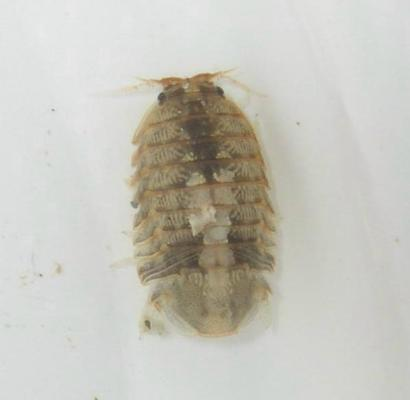
- Gnorimosphaeroma oregonense

Scientific classification
- Kingdom: Animalia
- Phylum: Arthropoda
- Class: Malacostraca
- Order: Isopoda
- Suborder: Sphaeromatidea; Wägele, 1989

Superfamilies
- †Archaeoniscidae? Seroloidea Sphaeromatoidea

= Sphaeromatidea =

Sphaeromatidea Temporal range: Bajocian to Present

Suborder of crustaceans

Sphaeromatidea is a suborder of isopod crustaceans.

== Families ==
The suborder contains seven extant and three extinct families in two superfamilies:

- Sphaeromatidea
  - †Archaeoniscidae?
  - Seroloidea Dana, 1852
    - Basserolidae Brandt & Poore, 2003
    - Bathynataliidae Kensley, 1978
    - Plakarthriidae Hansen, 1905
    - †Schweglerellidae Brandt, Crame, Polz & Thomson, 1999
    - Serolidae Dana, 1852
    - †Tricarinidae Feldmann, Kolahdouz, Biranvand & Schweigert, 2007
  - Sphaeromatoidea Latreille, 1825
    - Ancinidae Dana, 1852
    - Sphaeromatidae Latreille, 1825
    - Tecticipitidae Iverson, 1982
