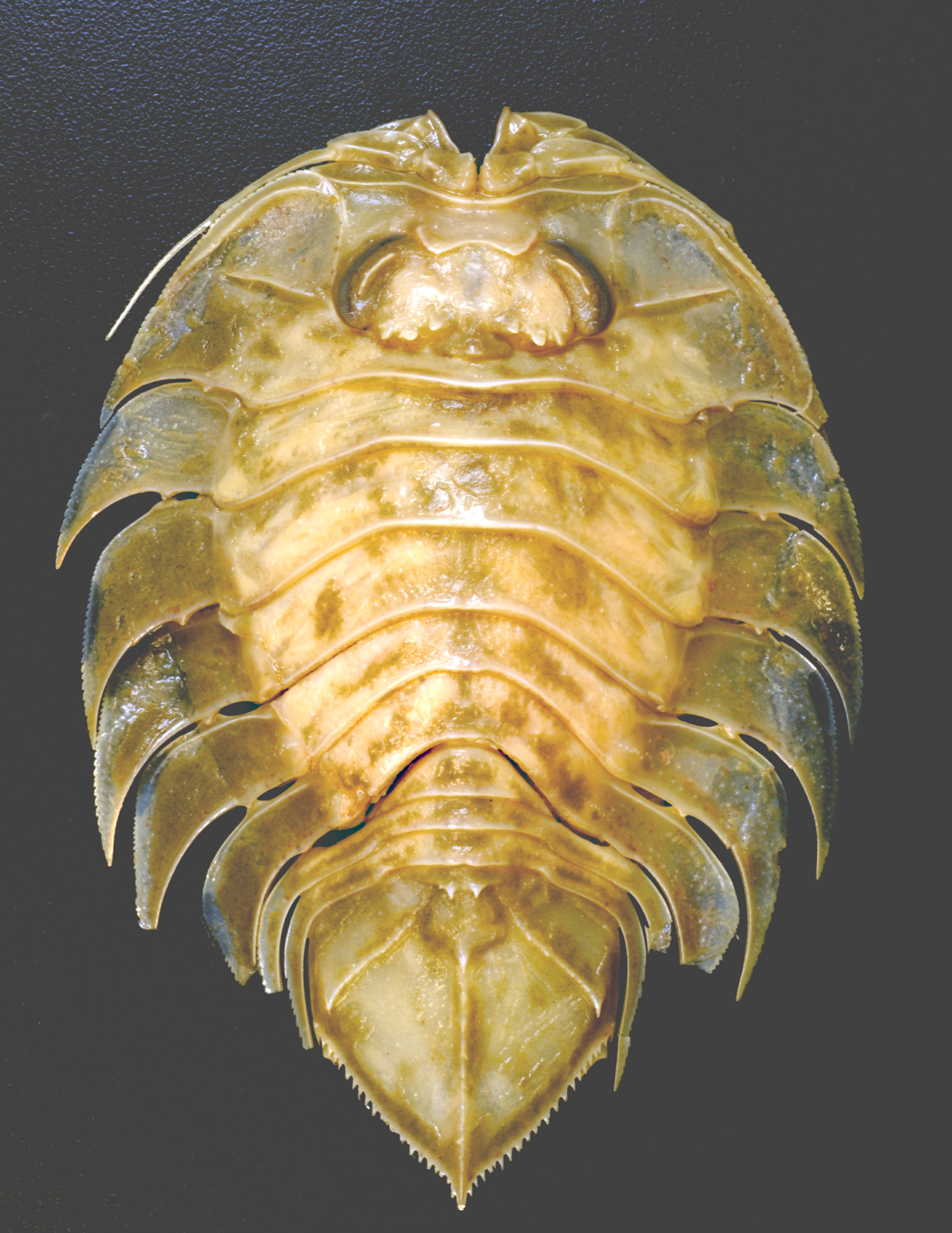

Scientific classification
- Kingdom: Animalia
- Phylum: Arthropoda
- Class: Malacostraca
- Order: Isopoda
- Family: Serolidae
- Genus: Ceratoserolis
- Species: C. trilobitoides

Binomial name
- Ceratoserolis trilobitoides (Eights, 1833)

Synonyms
- Brongniartia trilobitoides Eights, 1833; Ceratoserolis albohirsuta Cals, 1977; Ceratoserolis cornuta (Studer, 1879); Ceratoserolis griseostrigosa Cals, 1977; Ceratoserolis lineatocostata Cals, 1977; Ceratoserolis maculatovirgata Cals, 1977; Serolis cornuta Studer, 1879; Serolis trilobitoides (Eights, 1833)

= Ceratoserolis trilobitoides =

Species of crustacean

Ceratoserolis trilobitoides is a species of serolid isopod primarily found in Antarctica, but has also been documented near Chile and New Zealand. The species was named trilobitoides due to having a superficially similar appearance to trilobites, an extinct group of arthropods.
