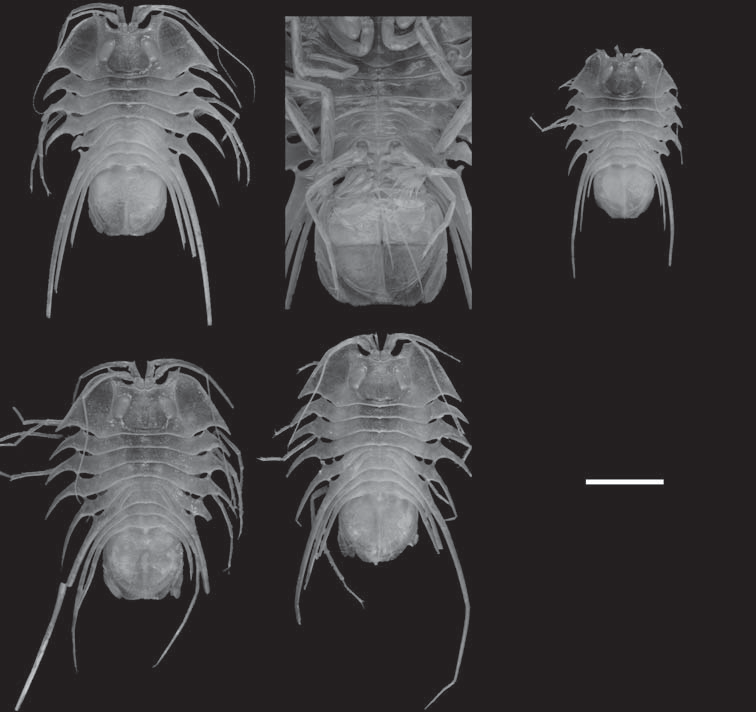
- Fig 5. from Poore & Storey, 2009

Scientific classification
- Kingdom: Animalia
- Phylum: Arthropoda
- Clade: Pancrustacea
- Class: Malacostraca
- Order: Isopoda
- Family: Serolidae
- Genus: Brucerolis
- Species: B. nowra

Binomial name
- Brucerolis nowra Poore & Storey, 2009

= Brucerolis nowra =

Species of crustaceans

Brucerolis nowra is a species of isopods in the family Serolidae, found in marine waters off Nowra in New South Wales.

The species was first described in 2009 by Gary Poore and Melissa Storey. The genus name honours Niel L. Bruce, and the species epithet refers to where the type specimens were found.
