= Tricarina =

Tricarina Temporal range: Barremian–Aptian

Scientific classification
- Kingdom: Animalia
- Phylum: Arthropoda
- Class: Malacostraca
- Order: Isopoda
- Suborder: Sphaeromatidea
- Superfamily: Seroloidea
- Family: †Tricarinidae; Feldmann et al., 2007
- Genus: †Tricarina; Feldmann et al., 2007
- Species: †T. gadvanensis

Binomial name
- †Tricarina gadvanensis Feldmann et al., 2007

Extinct genus of crustaceans

Tricarina is an extinct genus of crustaceans in order Isopoda, known from a single incomplete fossil specimen from the Cretaceous of western Iran. It has a flattened body with three longitudinal ridges, which give it its name.

== Sources ==
The single known specimen of Tricarina was discovered in a well core that had been bored at a site on the Khuzestan Plain in south-western Iran, at 31°18′13.3″N 47°47′28.6″E, and at a depth of 3,852 metres (12,638 ft). The rocks that contain it are calcareous shales, which form part of the Gadvan Formation, and are part of the main sequence of rocks for the production oil and gas around the Persian Gulf. Examination of the foraminiferan fossils show that the shales are Barremian to Aptian in age.

== Description ==
The fossil of Tricarina gadvanensis is known from a part and counterpart from a core drilled to make an oil well. It has been deposited in the Carnegie Museum of Natural History, Pittsburgh, Pennsylvania, as specimen number CM 54197. A segment of the cylindrical core was cut away before the fossil was discovered, and the fossil is accordingly incomplete: the front of the carapace extends over the cut edge, and much of the pleon is outside the edge of the core. Most of the carapace is visible, and shows a flattened form, with three distinct longitudinal carinae or ridges. The bases of the antennae are preserved, but no eyes are apparent. A single pereiopod (walking leg) is visible, and it ends without a chela (claw).

== Systematics ==
Feldmann et al. (2007) classified Tricarina gadvanensis as a decapod crustacean. According to Feldmann et al., T. gadvanensis cannot be accommodated in any of the previously known families of Decapoda. The few families which contain species with flattened bodies, such as Scyllaridae and the various families of Polychelida, all have very different ridge patterns. They therefore erected a new family, Tricarinidae, to accommodate this single genus and species. The lack of claws suggests affinity to slipper lobsters and spiny lobsters, and the new family is therefore placed in the inraorder Achelata. The genus name Tricarina refers to the three ridges on the carapace, while the specific epithet gadvanensis refers to the area from which the fossil was recovered.

Subsequent restudy of the fossil led Hyžný et al. (2020) to conclude that T. gadvanensis was not a decapod, but rather an isopod, probably closely related to the family Serolidae.

== Ecology ==
The lack of eyes in Tricarina suggests a deep-water organism, a feature also seen in Polychelidae and Thaumastochelidae. This is also corroborated by the rocks it was found in, which are thought to have been deposited in a deep, offshore setting. It is probable that Tricarina burrowed into the sediment, as was also inferred for Eryon, and as seen in some slipper lobsters.
