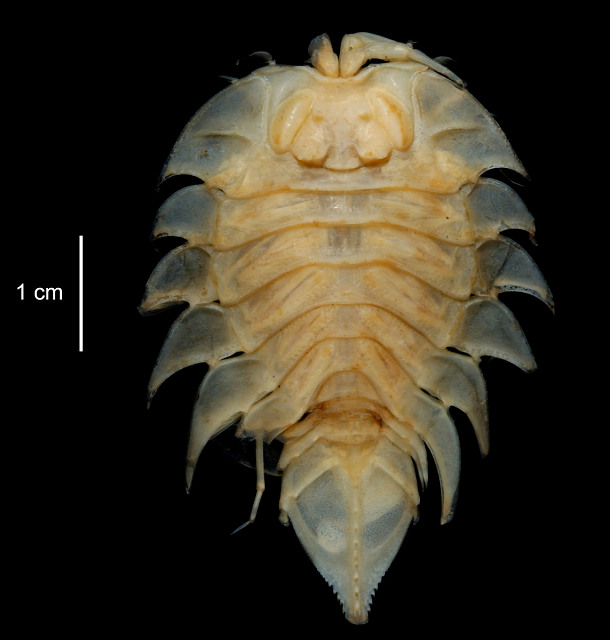

Scientific classification
- Kingdom: Animalia
- Phylum: Arthropoda
- Class: Malacostraca
- Order: Isopoda
- Family: Serolidae
- Genus: Ceratoserolis
- Species: C. meridionalis

Binomial name
- Ceratoserolis meridionalis (Vanhöffen, 1914)

Synonyms
- Serolis meridionalis Vanhöffen, 1914

= Ceratoserolis meridionalis =

Species of crustacean

Ceratoserolis meridionalis is a species of serolid isopod found in Antarctica, including the Antarctic Peninsula and South Shetland Islands. Ceratoserolis meridionalis have been observed to dig burrows in the sand on the ocean floor.
