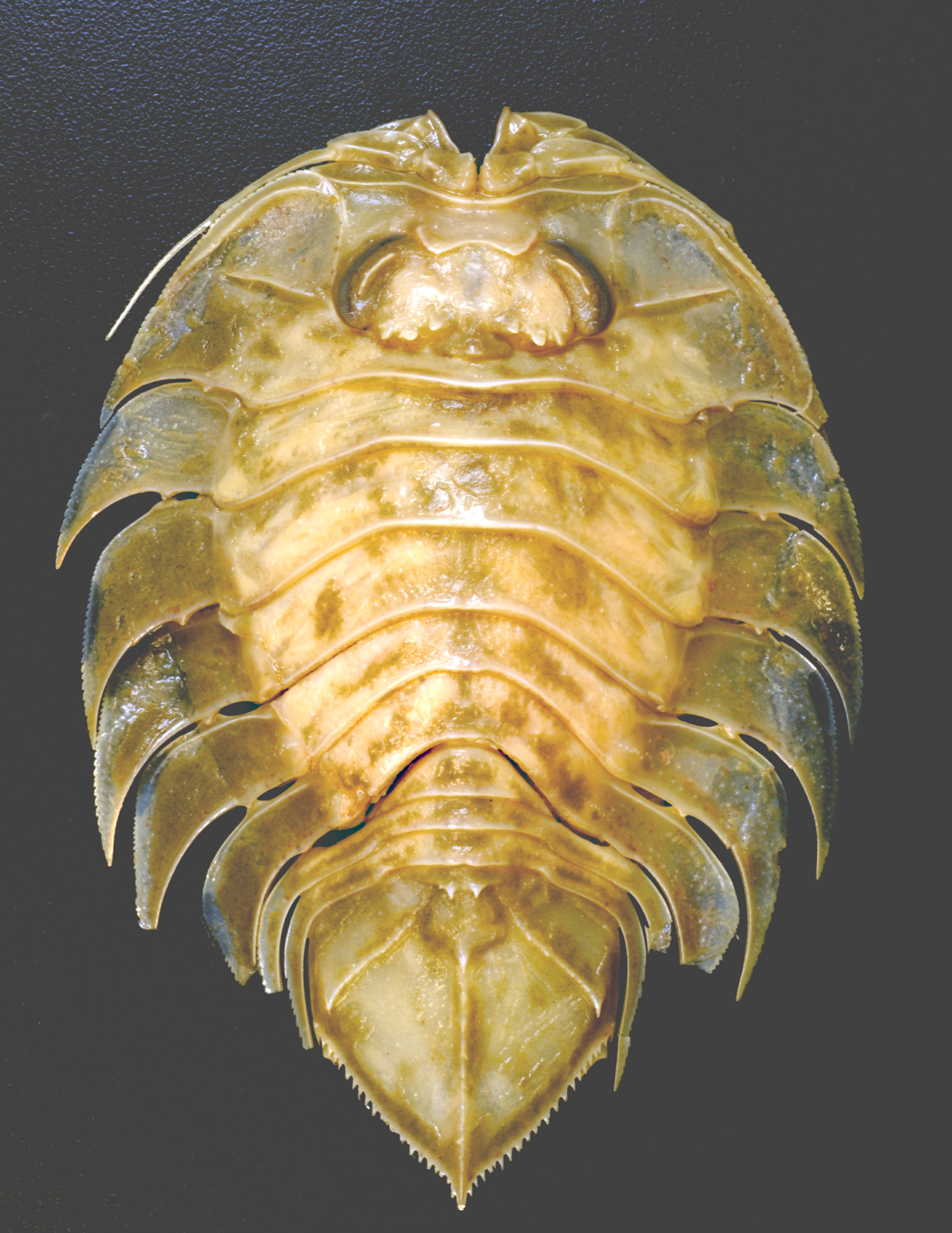
- Ceratoserolis trilobitoides

Scientific classification
- Kingdom: Animalia
- Phylum: Arthropoda
- Class: Malacostraca
- Order: Isopoda
- Family: Serolidae
- Genus: Ceratoserolis; Cals, 1977

= Ceratoserolis =

Genus of crustaceans

Ceratoserolis is a genus of isopods in the family Serolidae from the Southern Ocean around Antarctica and some Sub-Antarctic Islands. They prefer to live on soft bottoms and range of least between 24 and 950 m (80–3,120 ft) in depth. They are superficially similar to the unrelated, extinct trilobites (hence the specific name trilobitoides for the first described species) and reach up to about 8 cm (3.1 in) in length. They were once considered to be part of the genus Serolis and for a long time only Ceratoserolis trilobitoides was recognized. The validity of the other species has been disputed, but there are some morphological and genetic differences between them and C. trilobitoides, and there are indications that additional, currently unrecognized species of Ceratoserolis exist.

Because Ceratoserolis are widespread, locally abundant and relatively large for isopods, they have often been studied and used as model organism for the Antarctic region. They are slow-maturing, only breed once in their life, and the eggs and young are brooded for an extended period—almost two years—in the female's marsupium. As is typical of Antarctic isopods, there is no pelagic larval stage.

== Species ==
There are four currently recognized species:

- Ceratoserolis meridionalis (Vanhöffen, 1914)
- Ceratoserolis pasternaki (Kussakin, 1967)
- Ceratoserolis serratus (Brandt, 1988)
- Ceratoserolis trilobitoides (Eights, 1833)
