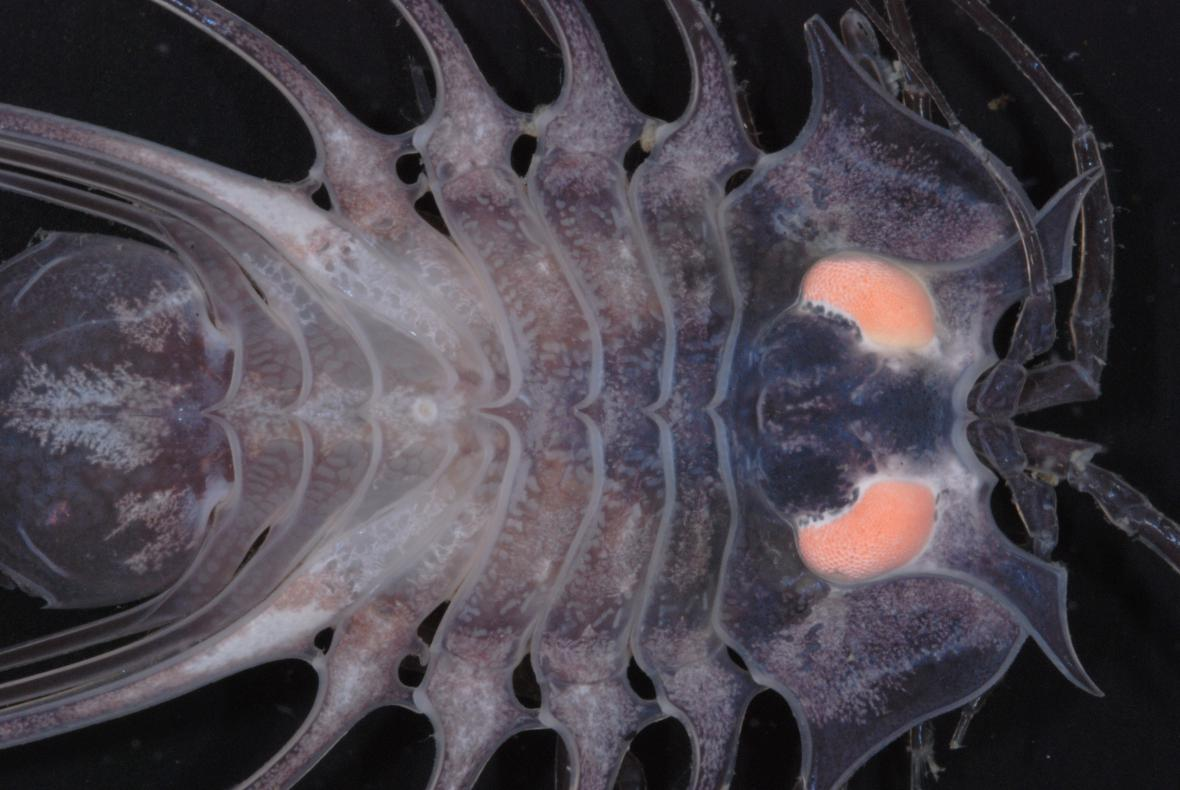
- Brucerolis brandtae
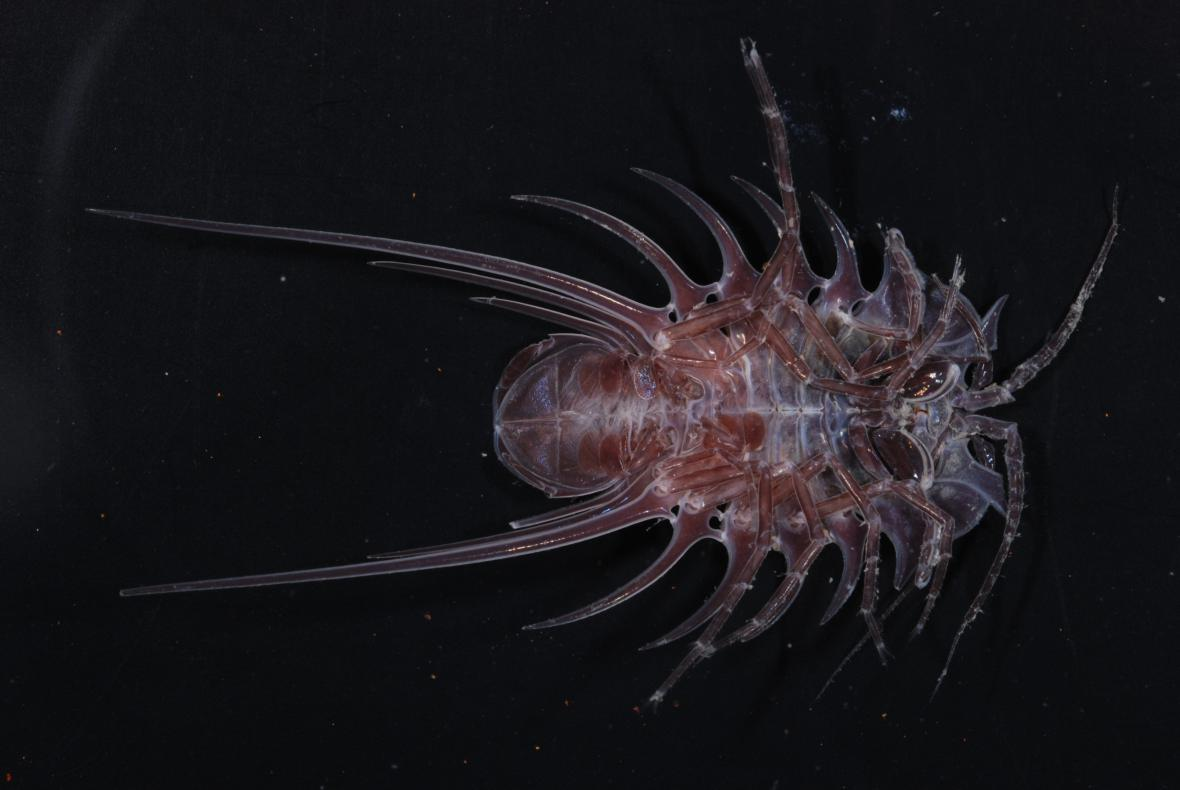

Scientific classification
- Kingdom: Animalia
- Phylum: Arthropoda
- Clade: Pancrustacea
- Class: Malacostraca
- Order: Isopoda
- Family: Serolidae
- Genus: Brucerolis
- Species: B. brandtae

Binomial name
- Brucerolis brandtae Poore & Storey, 2009

= Brucerolis brandtae =

Species of crustaceans

Brucerolis brandtae is a species of marine isopod in the family Serolidae, found in the Southern Ocean in the waters around New Zealand.

The species was first described in 2009 by Gary Poore and Melissa Storey, and the genus name honours Niel L. Bruce.
