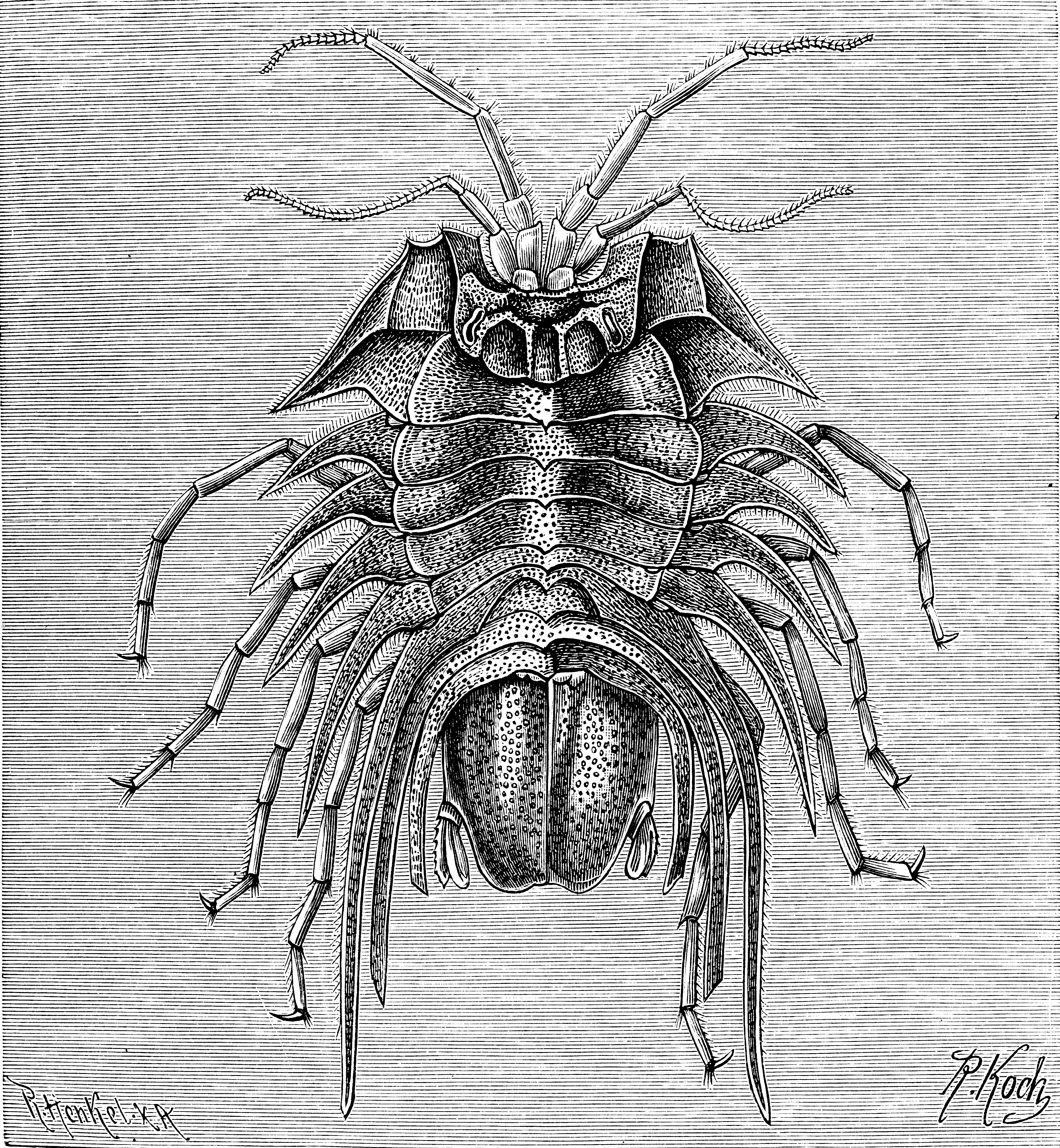

Scientific classification
- Kingdom: Animalia
- Phylum: Arthropoda
- Class: Malacostraca
- Order: Isopoda
- Family: Serolidae
- Genus: Brucerolis
- Species: B. bromleyana

Binomial name
- Brucerolis bromleyana (Suhm, 1876)

= Brucerolis bromleyana =

Species of crustaceans

Brucerolis bromleyana is a benthic species of isopods in the family Serolidae, found in the Southern Ocean.

The species was first described as Serolis bromleyana by Rudolf von Willemoes-Suhm in 1876. It was transferred to the genus, Brucerolis, in 2009 by Gary Poore and Melissa Storey,

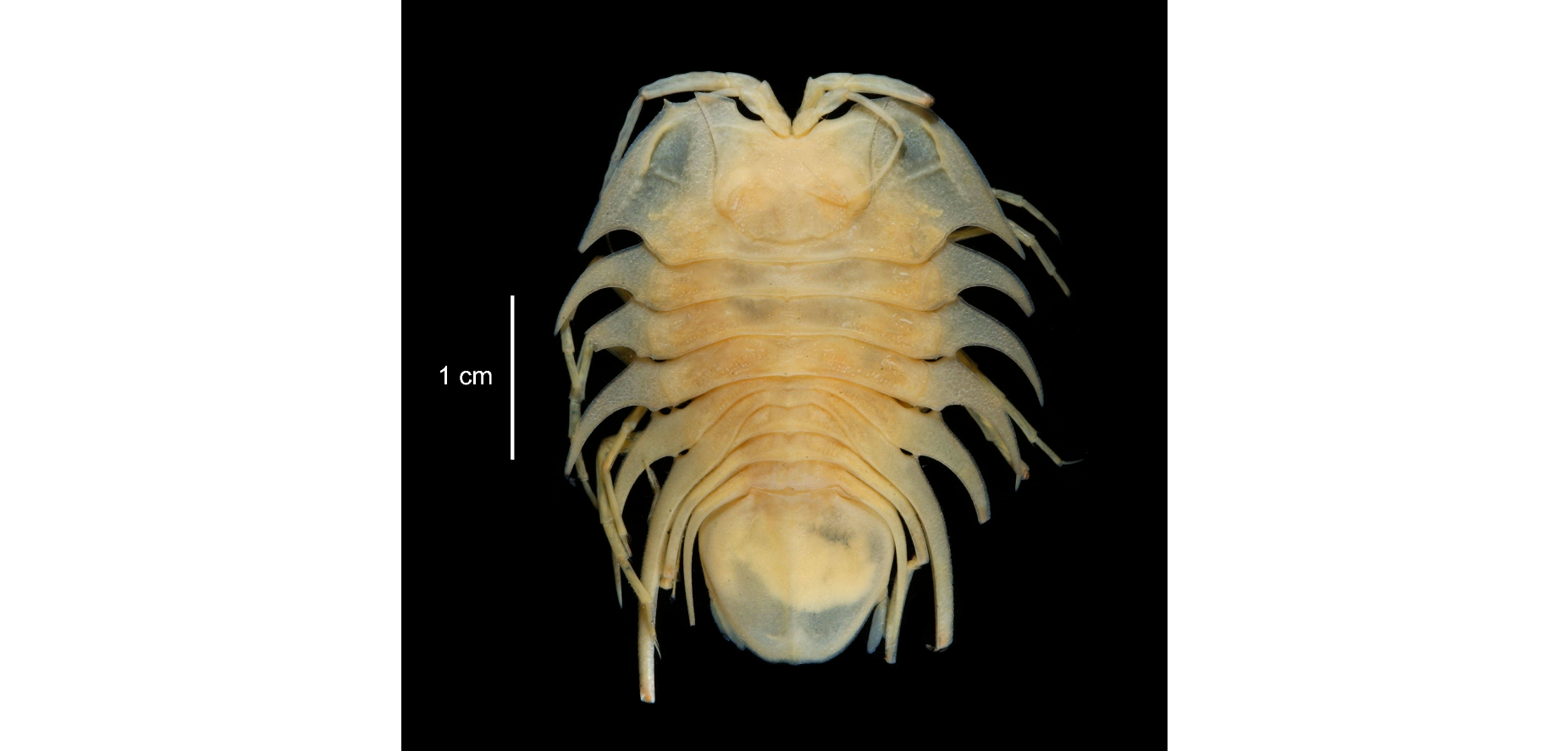
dorsal view

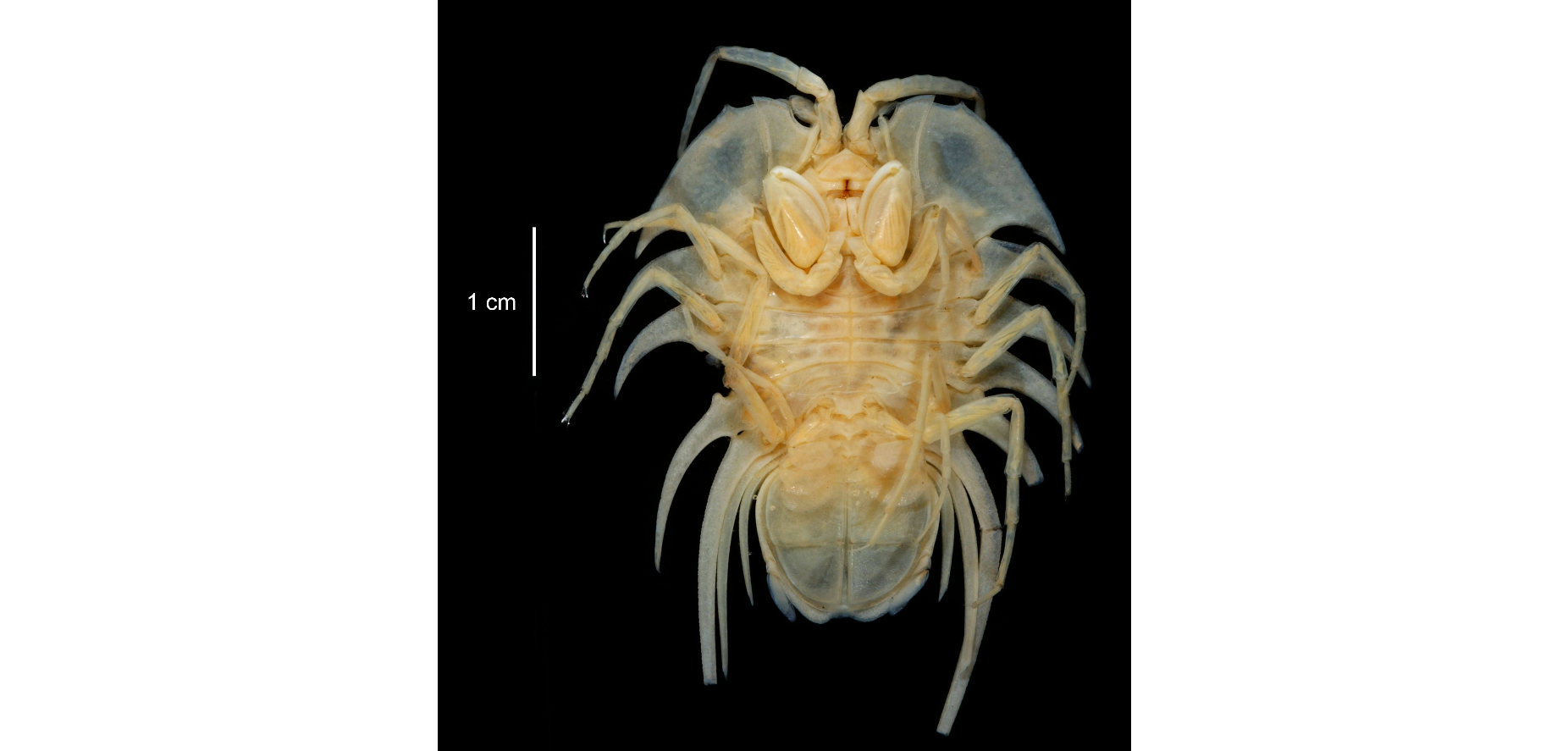
ventral view
