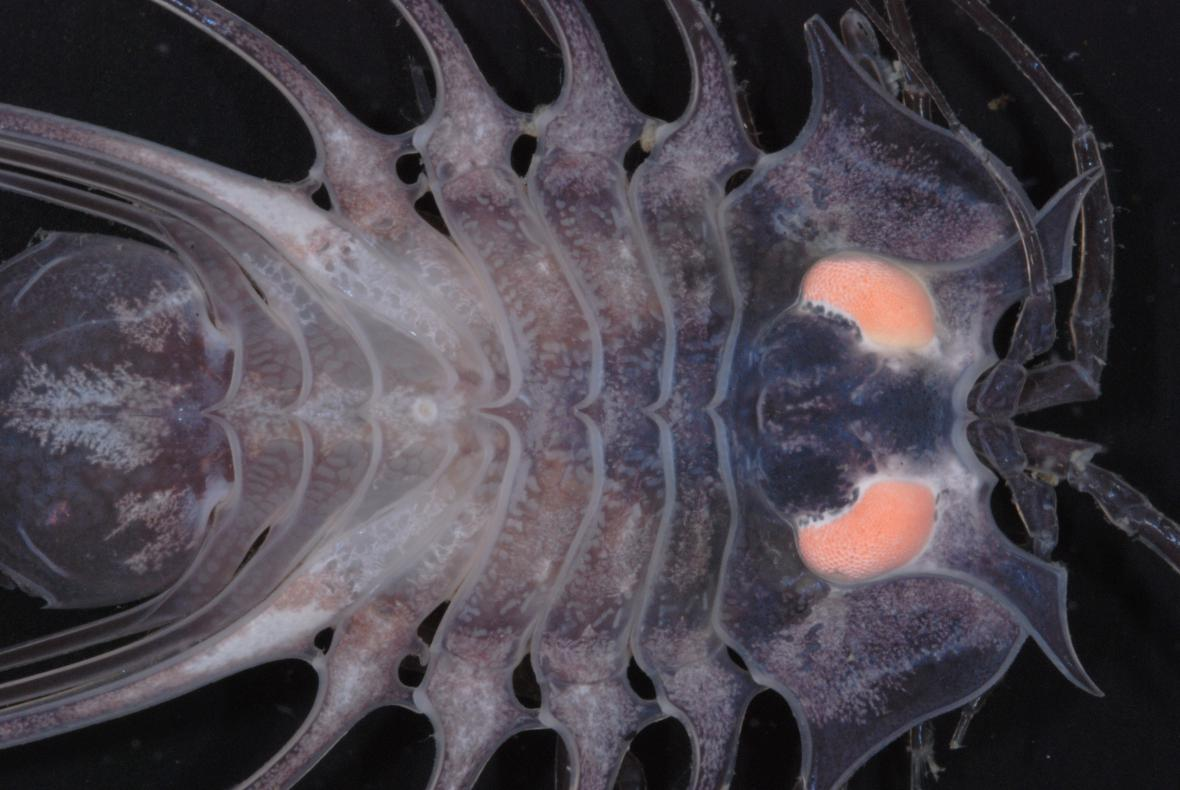
- Brucerolis brandtae

Scientific classification
- Kingdom: Animalia
- Phylum: Arthropoda
- Clade: Pancrustacea
- Class: Malacostraca
- Order: Isopoda
- Family: Serolidae
- Genus: Brucerolis; Poore & Storey, 2009

Type species
- Brucerolis nowra Poore & Storey, 2009

= Brucerolis =

Genus of crustaceans

Brucerolis is a genus of isopods in the family Serolidae, found in the Southern Ocean.

The genus was first described in 2009 by Gary Poore and Melissa Storey, and the genus name honours Niel L. Bruce.

== Species ==
There are ten recognized species:

- Brucerolis brandtae Storey & Poore, 2009
- Brucerolis bromleyana (Suhm, 1876)
- Brucerolis cidaris (Poore & Brandt, 1997)
- Brucerolis howensis Storey & Poore, 2009
- Brucerolis hurleyi Storey & Poore, 2009
- Brucerolis macdonnellae (Menzies, 1962)
- Brucerolis maryannae (Menzies, 1962)
- Brucerolis nowra Poore & Storey, 2009
- Brucerolis osheai Storey & Poore, 2009
- Brucerolis victoriensis Storey & Poore, 2009
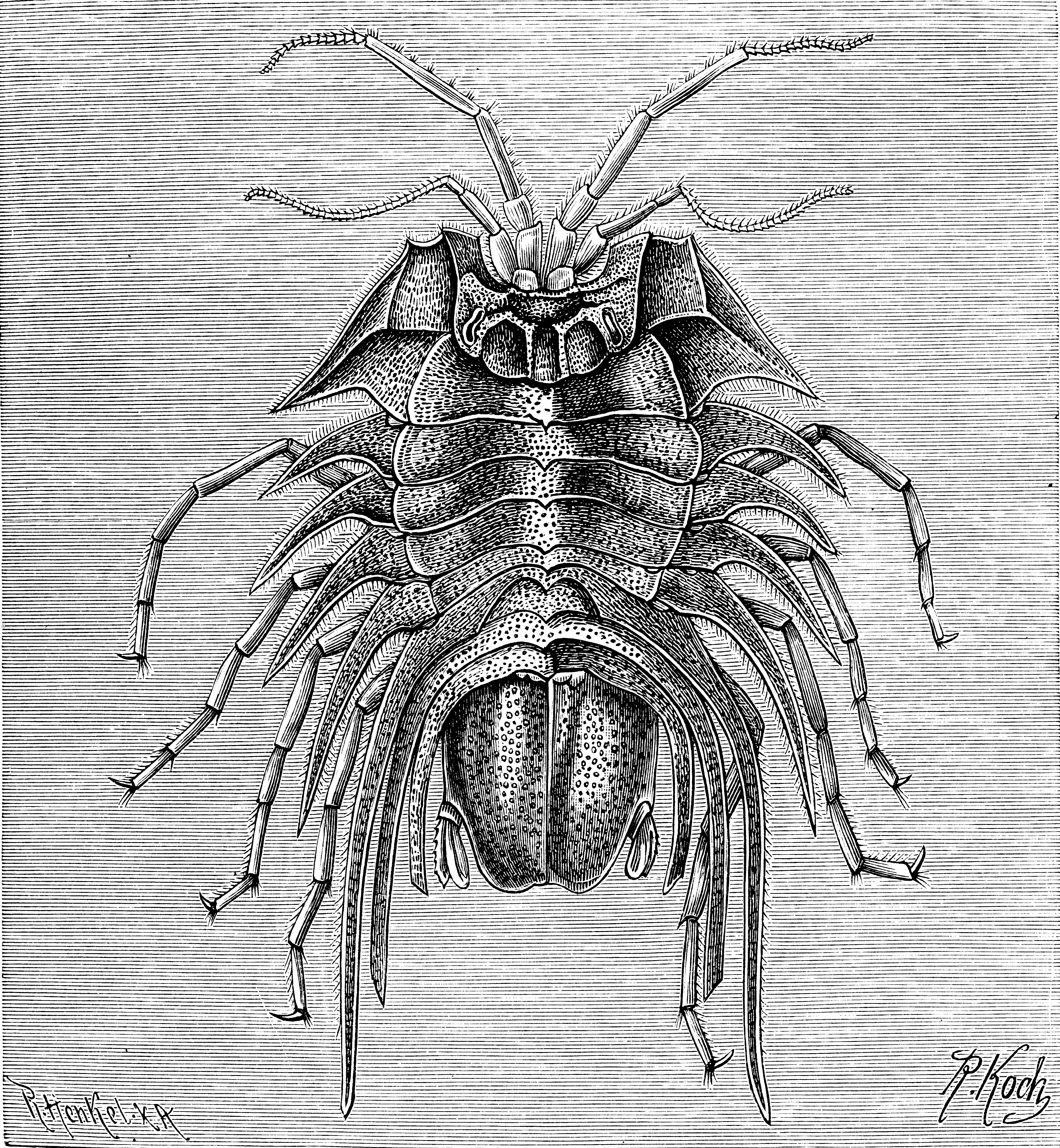
Brucerolis bromleyana

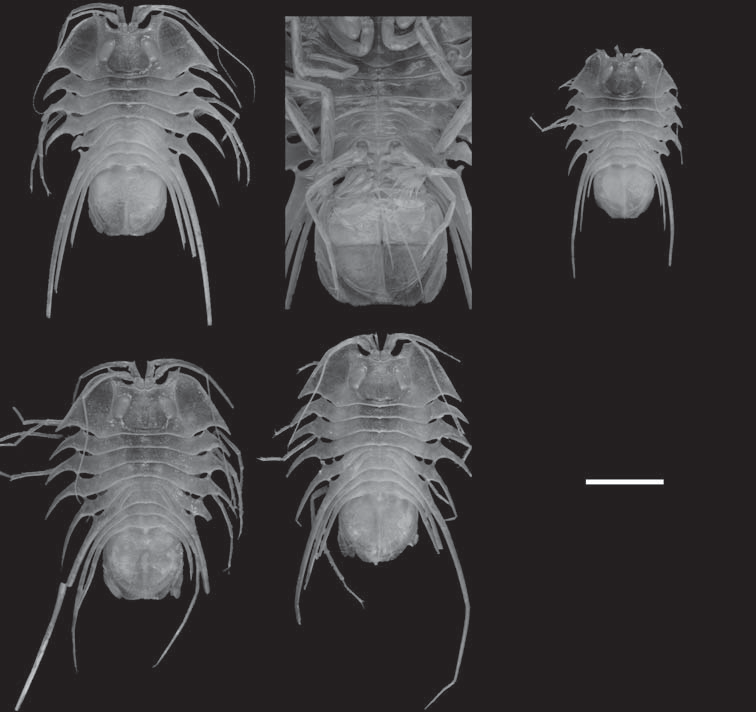
Brucerolis nowra

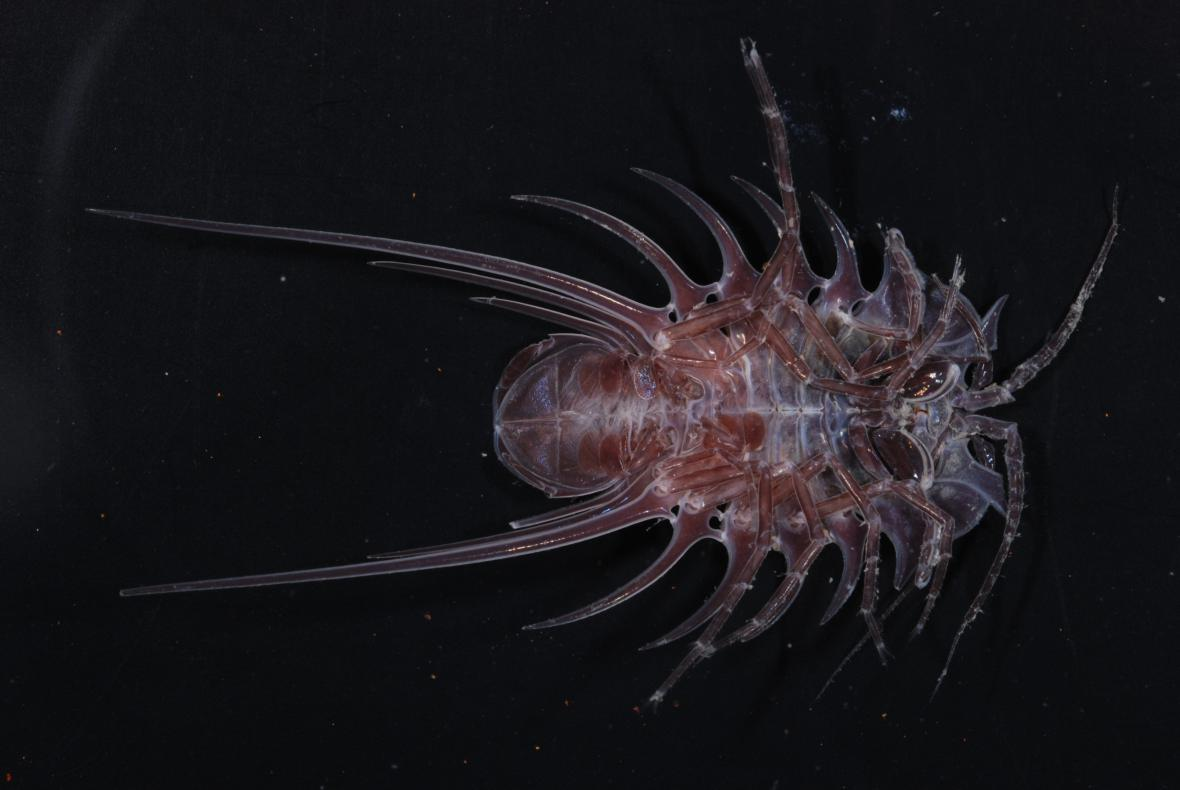
Brucerolis brandtae
