= Seroloidea =

Scientific classification
- Kingdom: Animalia
- Phylum: Arthropoda
- Clade: Pancrustacea
- Class: Malacostraca
- Order: Isopoda
- Suborder: Sphaeromatidea
- Superfamily: Seroloidea; Dana, 1852

Families
- See text.

Synonyms
- Serolidea Dana, 1852

Superfamily of isopods

Seroloidea is a superfamily of isopod crustaceans in the suborder Sphaeromatidea.

== Families ==
Seroloidea contains 6 families, four extant and two extinct. A seventh family, Chelonidiidae, exists, but it is considered a synonym of Plakarthriidae by the World Register of Marine Species.

=== Extant families ===
- Basserolidae Brandt & Poore, 2003
- Bathynataliidae Kensley, 1978
- Chelonidiidae Pfeffer, 1887 (synonym of Plakarthriidae)
- Plakarthriidae Hansen, 1905
- Serolidae Dana, 1852

=== Extinct families ===
- †Schweglerellidae Brandt, Crame, Polz & Thomson, 1999
- †Tricarinidae Feldmann, Kolahdouz, Biranvand & Schweigert, 2007
