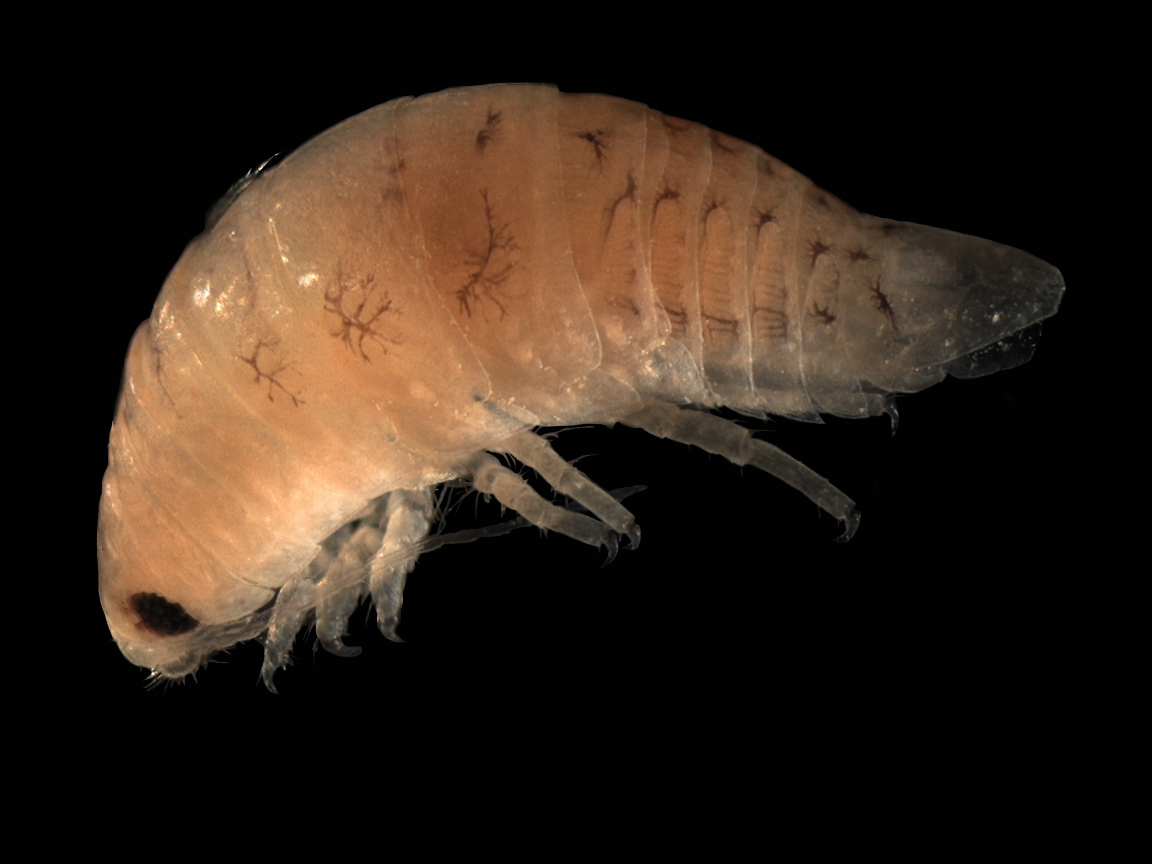
- Eurydice affinis

Scientific classification
- Domain: Eukaryota
- Kingdom: Animalia
- Phylum: Arthropoda
- Class: Malacostraca
- Order: Isopoda
- Suborder: Flabellifera; Sars, 1882

= Flabellifera =

Suborder of crustaceans

Flabellifera is a former suborder of isopod crustaceans. It is a polyphyletic or paraphyletic group, and contained over 3000 species. Its members are now placed in the Sphaeromatidea and Cymothoida.
