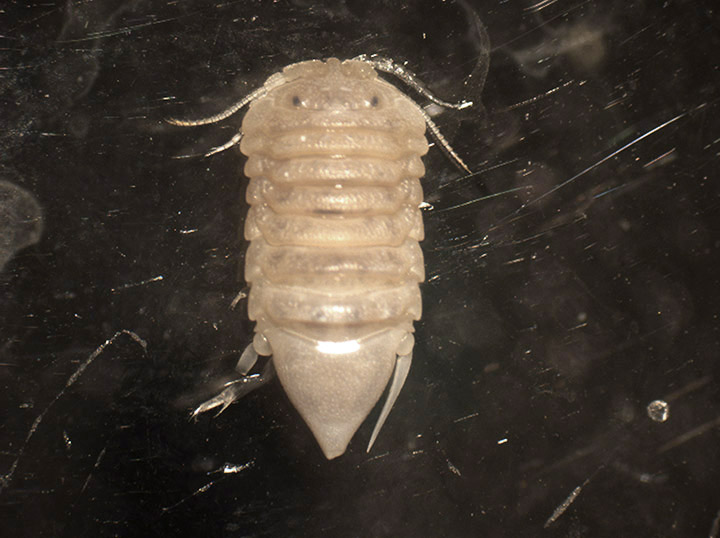
- Ancinus depressus

Scientific classification
- Kingdom: Animalia
- Phylum: Arthropoda
- Class: Malacostraca
- Order: Isopoda
- Suborder: Sphaeromatidea
- Superfamily: Sphaeromatoidea
- Family: Ancinidae; Dana, 1852

= Ancinidae =

Family of crustaceans

Ancinidae is a family of isopods belonging to the suborder Sphaeromatidea.

== Genera ==
The family contains the following genera:

- Ancinus Milne Edwards, 1840
- Bathycopea Tattersall, 1905
