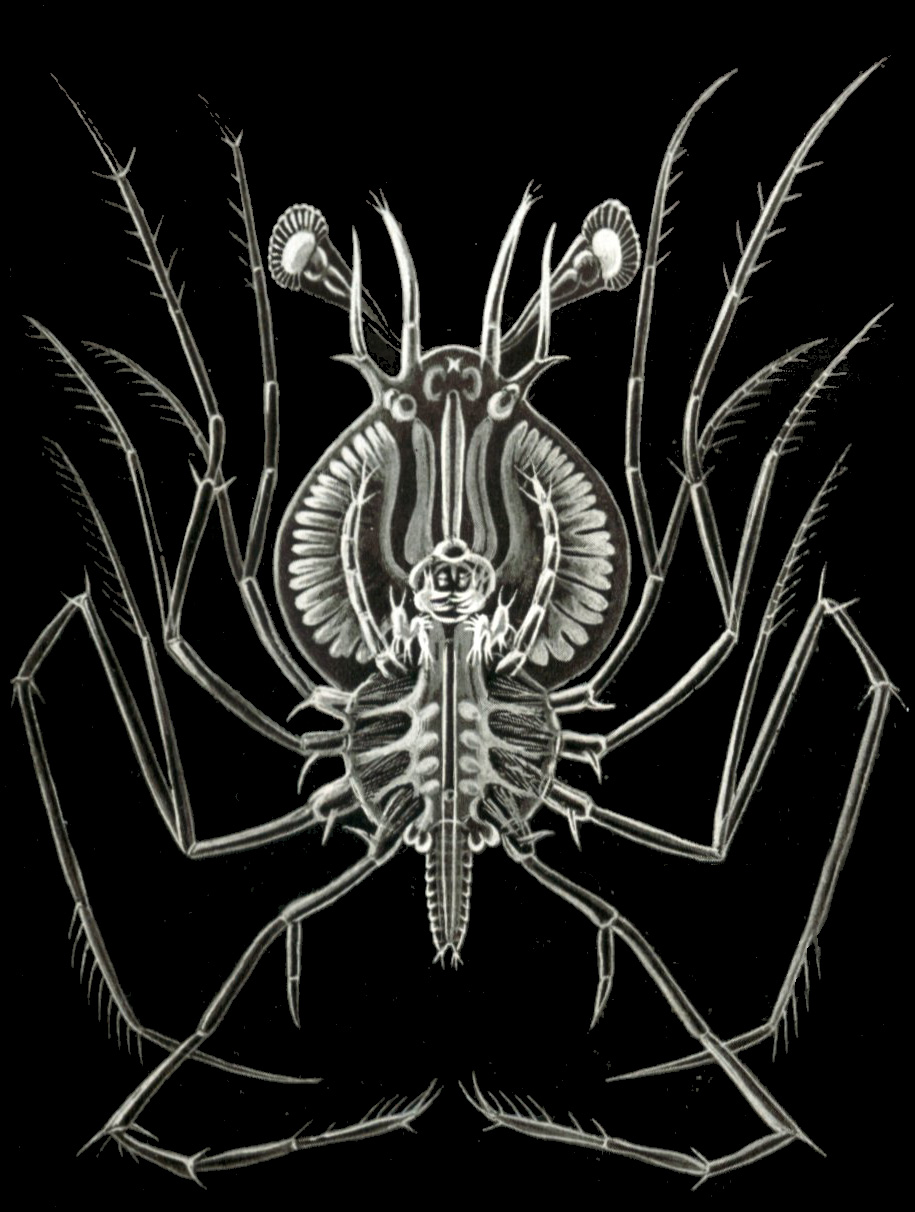
- The phyllosoma larva is characteristic of the Achelata (drawing by Haeckel)

Scientific classification
- Kingdom: Animalia
- Phylum: Arthropoda
- Class: Malacostraca
- Order: Decapoda
- Suborder: Pleocyemata
- Clade: Reptantia
- Infraorder: Achelata; Scholtz & Richter, 1995

Families
- Palinuridae (inc. Synaxidae); Scyllaridae; †Cancrinidae; †Tricarinidae

= Achelata =

Achelata Temporal range: Upper Jurassic – Recent

Infraorder of crustaceans

The Achelata is an infraorder of the decapod crustaceans, holding the spiny lobsters, slipper lobsters and their fossil relatives.

== Description ==
The name "Achelata" derives from the fact that all the members of this group lack the chelae (claws) that are found on almost all other decapods (from the Ancient Greek ἀ-, a- = "not", χηλή, chela = "claw"). They are further united by the great enlargement of the second antennae, by the special "phyllosoma" form of the larva, and by a number of other characters.

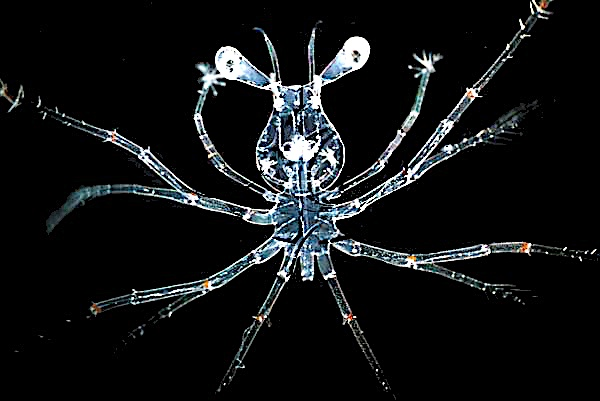
Phyllosoma larva (micrograph)

== Classification and fossil record ==
The infraorder Achelata belongs to the group Reptantia, which consists of the walking/crawling decapods (lobsters and crabs). The cladogram below shows Achelata's placement within the larger order Decapoda, from analysis by Wolfe et al., 2019.

- Decapoda
  - - Dendrobranchiata (prawns)
  - Pleocyemata
    - - Stenopodidea (boxer shrimp)
      - - Procarididea
        - Caridea ("true" shrimp)
    - Reptantia (crawling / walking decapods)
      - - Achelata (spiny lobsters and slipper lobsters)
        - - Polychelida (benthic crustaceans)
          - Astacidea (lobsters and crayfish)
      - - Axiidea (mud shrimp, ghost shrimp, and burrowing shrimp)
        - - Gebiidea (mud lobsters and mud shrimp)
          - - Anomura (hermit crabs and allies)
            - Brachyura ("true" crabs)

Achelata contains the spiny lobsters (Palinuridae), the slipper lobsters (Scyllaridae) and the furry lobsters (Synaxidae, now usually included in Palinuridae), as well as two extinct families, Cancrinidae and Tricarinidae.

Extant families of Achelata

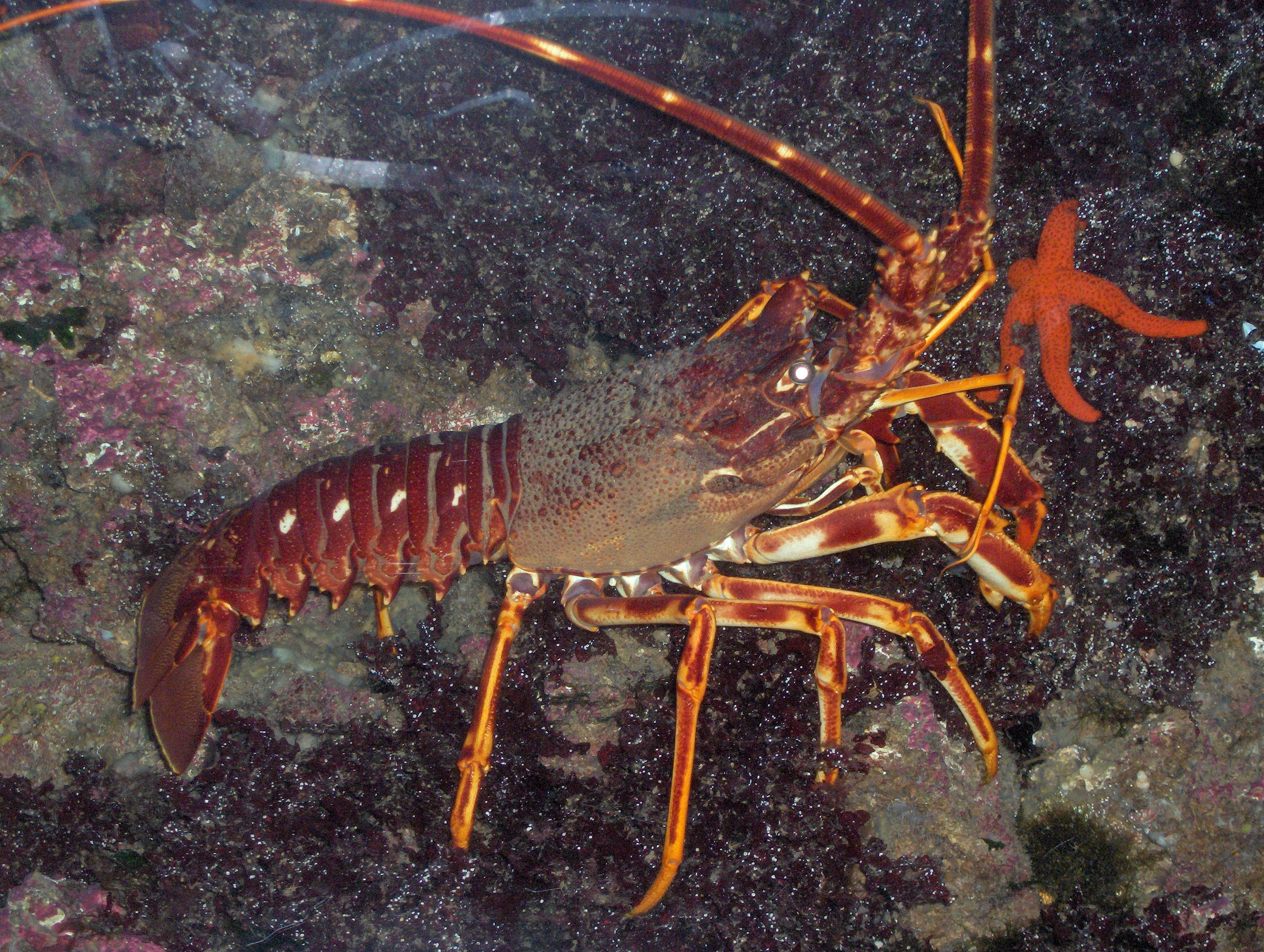
Palinurus elephas
Palinuridae

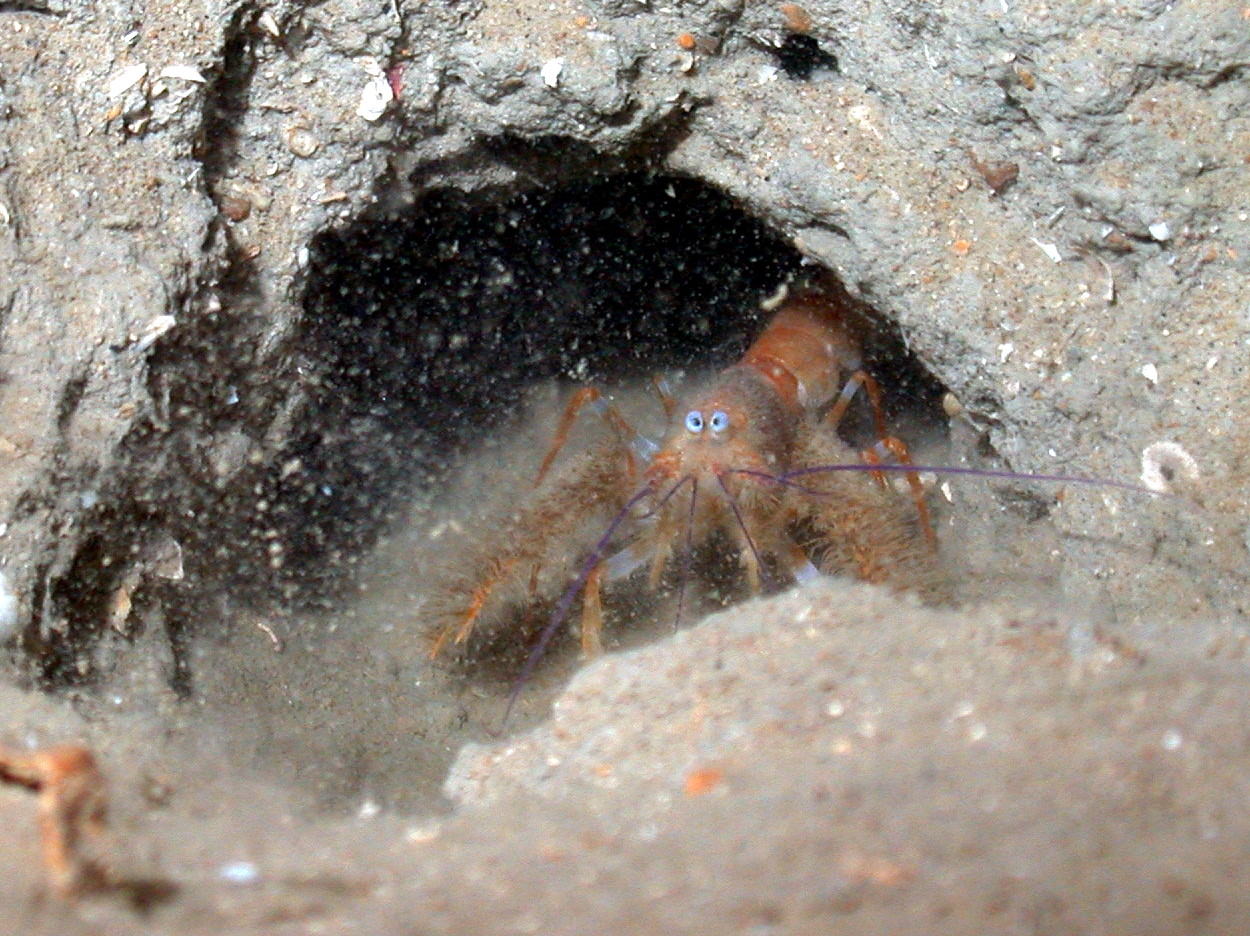
Palinurellus gundlachi
Palinuridae, formerly Synaxidae

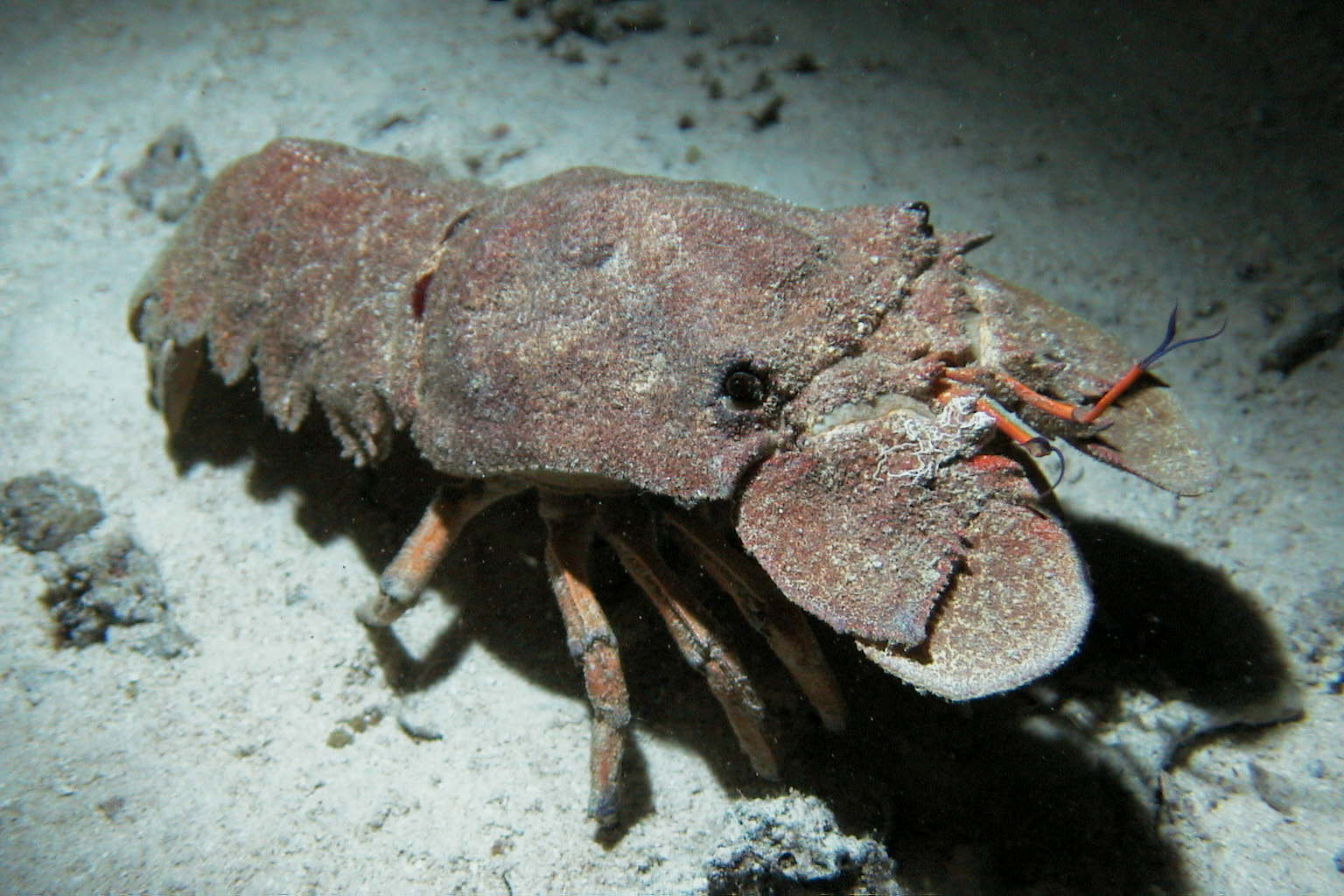
Scyllarides latus
Scyllaridae

Both Palinuridae and Scyllaridae have a fossil record extending back to the Cretaceous. The two fossil families contain a single genus each; Tricarina is known from a single Cretaceous fossil, while Cancrinos is known from the Jurassic and Cretaceous. One estimate of the divergence between Achelata and its closest relatives places it at about 341 million years ago.
