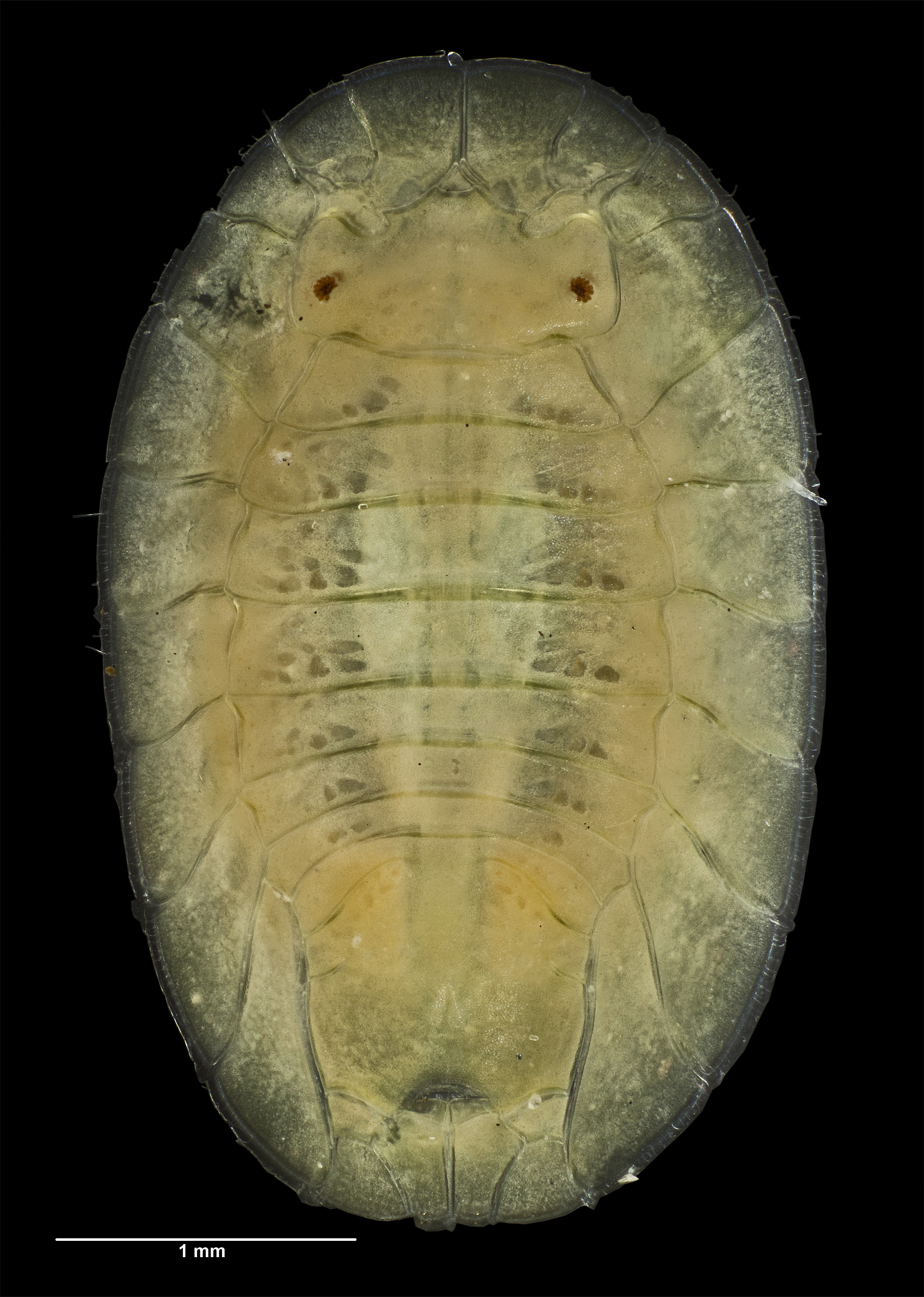
- Plakarthrium typicum

Scientific classification
- Kingdom: Animalia
- Phylum: Arthropoda
- Class: Malacostraca
- Order: Isopoda
- Superfamily: Seroloidea
- Family: Plakarthriidae; Chilton, 1883
- Genus: Plakarthrium; Chilton, 1883

Species
- See text.

Synonyms
- Chelonidium Pfeffer, 1887

= Plakarthrium =

Genus of crustaceans

Plakarthrium is a genus of isopods belonging to the monotypic family Plakarthriidae.

The species of this genus are found in the southernmost South Hemisphere.

== Species ==
The genus contains the following Species:

- Plakarthrium australiense Poore & Brandt, 2001
- Plakarthrium punctatissimum (Pfeffer, 1887)
- Plakarthrium typicum Chilton, 1883
