= Bathynataliidae =

Scientific classification
- Kingdom: Animalia
- Phylum: Arthropoda
- Class: Malacostraca
- Order: Isopoda
- Superfamily: Seroloidea
- Family: Bathynataliidae

Family of crustaceans

Bathynataliidae is a family of crustaceans belonging to the order Isopoda.

Genera:

- Bathynatalia Barnard, 1957
- Biremia Bruce, 1985
- Naudea Kensley, 1979
