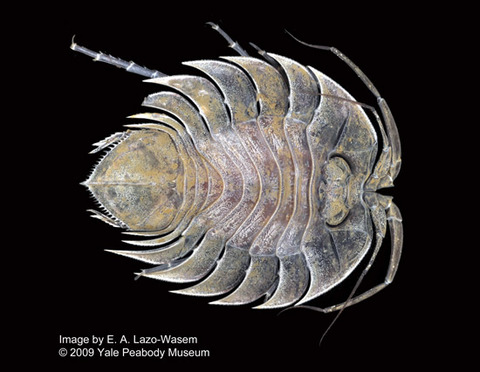

Scientific classification
- Kingdom: Animalia
- Phylum: Arthropoda
- Class: Malacostraca
- Order: Isopoda
- Family: Serolidae
- Genus: Serolis; Leach, 1818

= Serolis =

Genus of crustaceans

Serolis is a genus of isopod crustacean, containing the following species:

- Serolis antarctica Beddard, 1886
- Serolis arntzi Brandt, 2003
- Serolis aspera Sheppard, 1933
- Serolis glacialis (Tattersall, 1921)
- Serolis gracilis Beddard, 1884
- Serolis hoshiaii Nunomura, 2005
- Serolis insignis Moreira, 1977
- Serolis kempi Sheppard, 1933
- Serolis leachi Brandt, 1988
- Serolis paradoxa (Fabricius, 1775)
- Serolis reptans Brandt, 1988
- Serolis rugosa Kussakin, 1982
- Serolis serresi Lucas, 1877
- Serolis zoiphila Stechow, 1921
