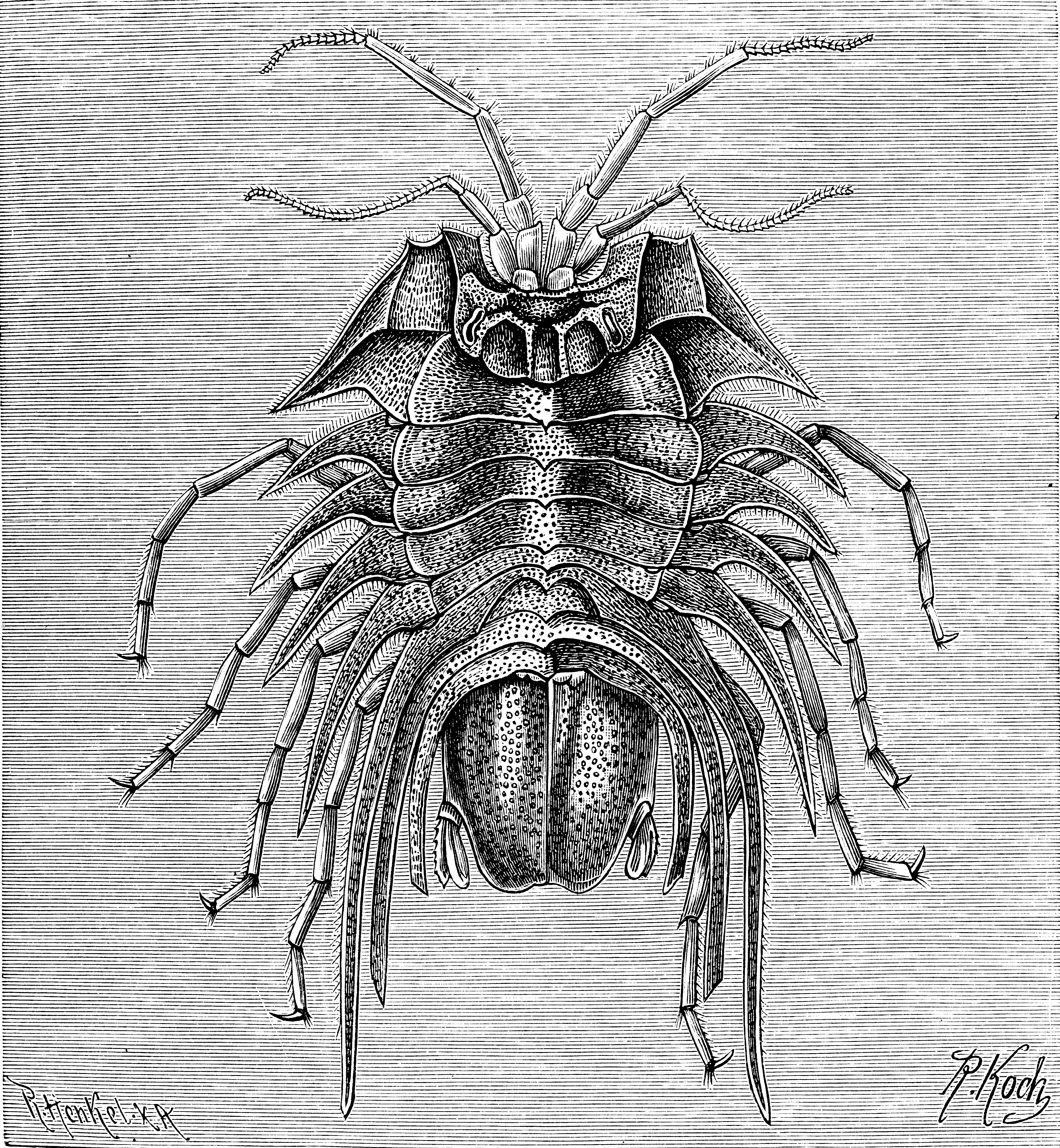
- Brucerolis bromleyana

Scientific classification
- Kingdom: Animalia
- Phylum: Arthropoda
- Clade: Pancrustacea
- Class: Malacostraca
- Order: Isopoda
- Superfamily: Seroloidea
- Family: Serolidae; Dana, 1852

= Serolidae =

Family of crustaceans

Serolidae is a family of isopod crustaceans. The family encompasses 22 genera with 109 species. These species are exclusively marine and are distributed across the marine realms as follows: one species can be found in the Temperate Northern Atlantic, one species in the Temperate Northern Pacific, seven species in the Tropical Atlantic, six species in the Central Indo-Pacific, 16 species in Temperate South America, one species in Temperate Southern Africa, 20 species in Temperate Australasia, and 31 species in the Southern Ocean. They convergently evolved a trilobite-like shape.

== Genera ==
Serolidae contains the following genera :

- Acanthoserolis Brandt, 1988
- Acutiserolis Brandt, 1988
- Atlantoserolis Wägele, 1994
- Basserolis Poore, 1985
- Brazilserolis Wägele, 1994
- Brucerolis Poore & Storey, 2009
- Caecoserolis Wägele, 1994
- Ceratoserolis Cals, 1977
- Cristaserolis Brandt, 1988
- Frontoserolis Brandt, 1991
- Glabroserolis Menzies, 1962
- Heteroserolis Brandt, 1991
- Leptoserolis Brandt, 1988
- Myopiarolis Bruce, 2009
- Neoserolis Wägele, 1994
- Paraserolis Wägele, 1994
- Sedorolis Bruce, 2009
- Septemserolis Wägele, 1994
- Serolella Pfeffer, 1891
- Serolina Poore, 1987
- Serolis Leach, 1818
- Spinoserolis Brandt, 1988
- Thysanoserolis Brandt, 1991
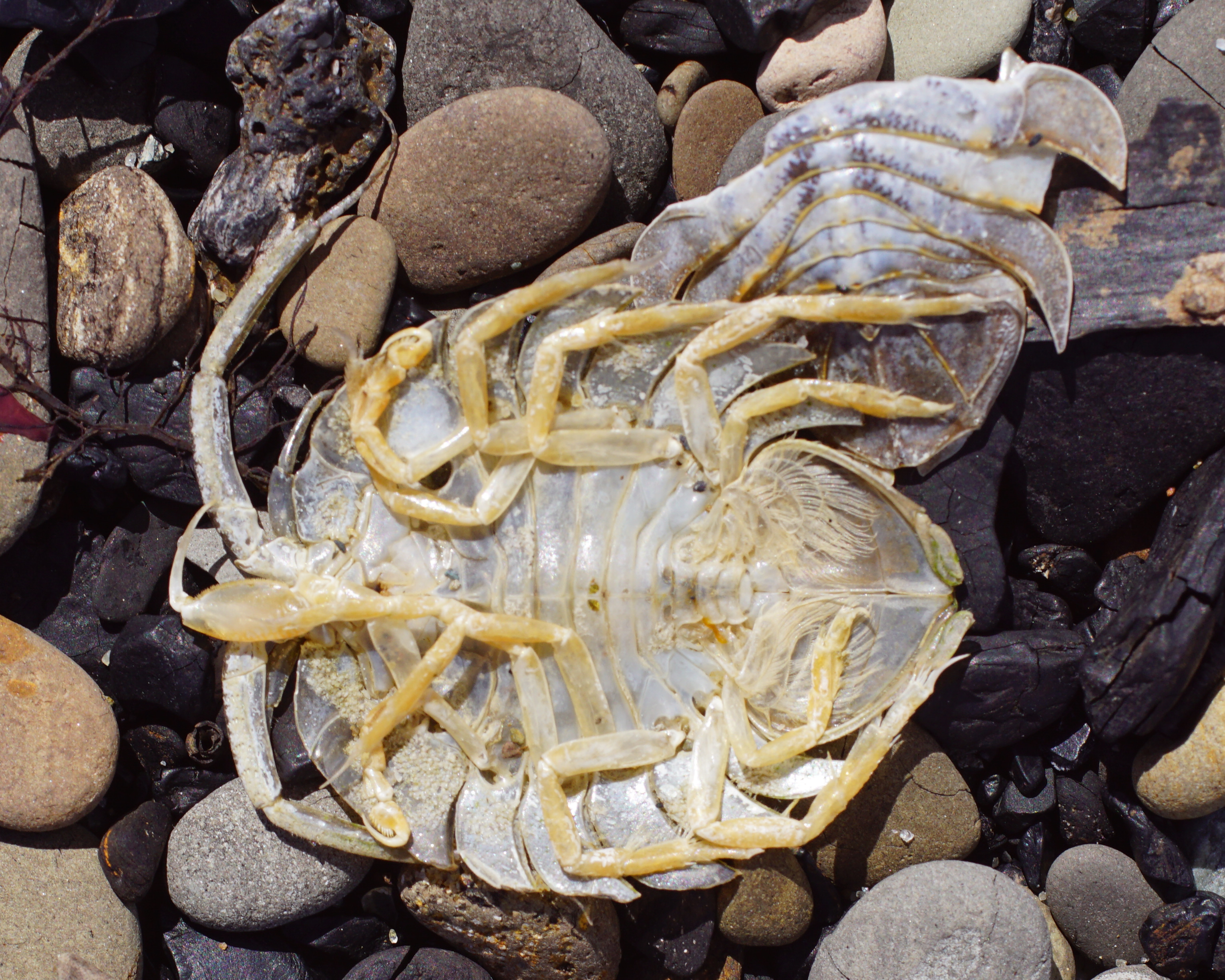
Underside of an unidentified (dried) marine serolid isopod seen on the shore in Punta Arenas, Chile. About 3–4 cm in length.

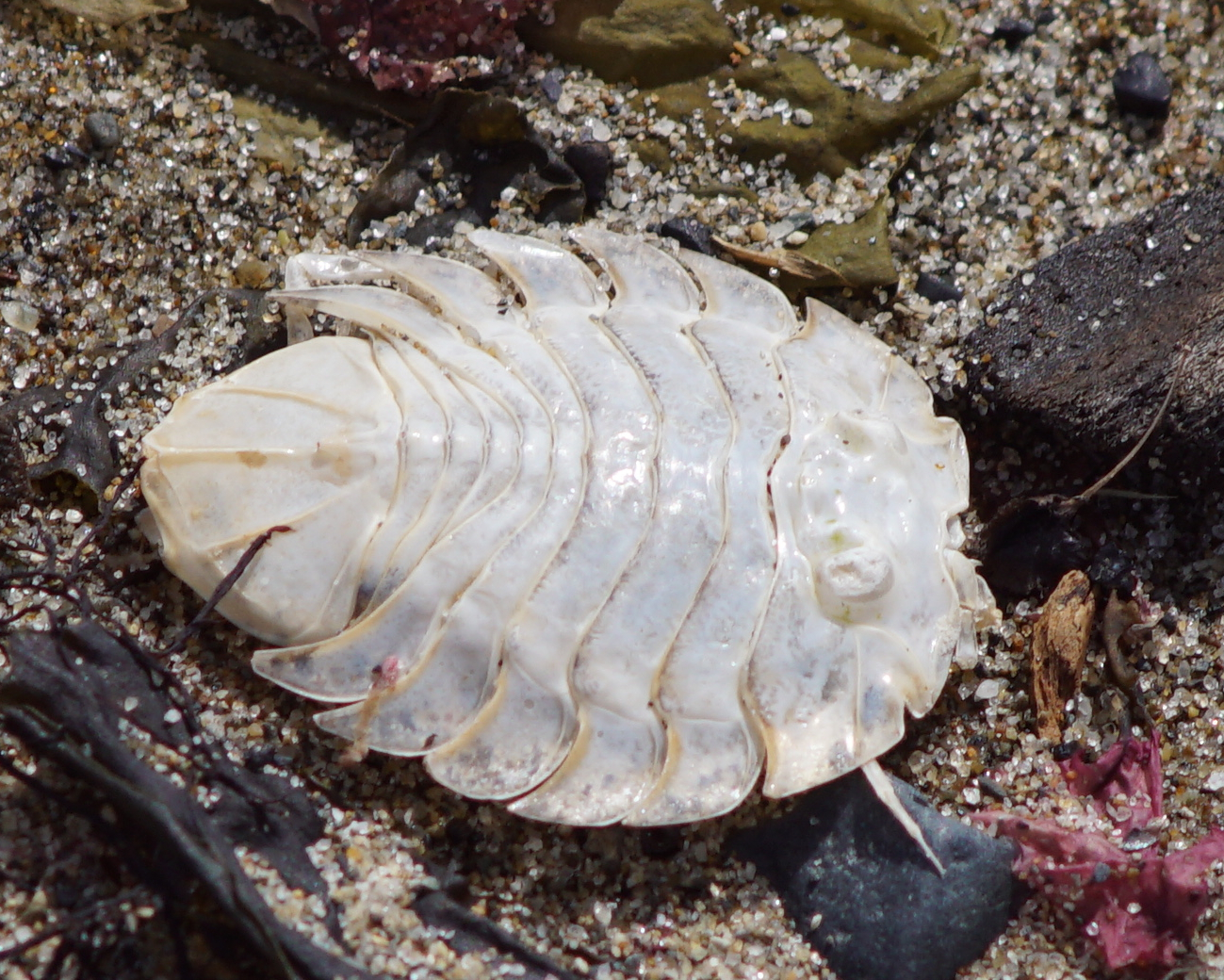
Molt of an unidentified (dried) marine serolid isopod seen on the shore in Punta Arenas, Chile. About 3–4 cm in length.

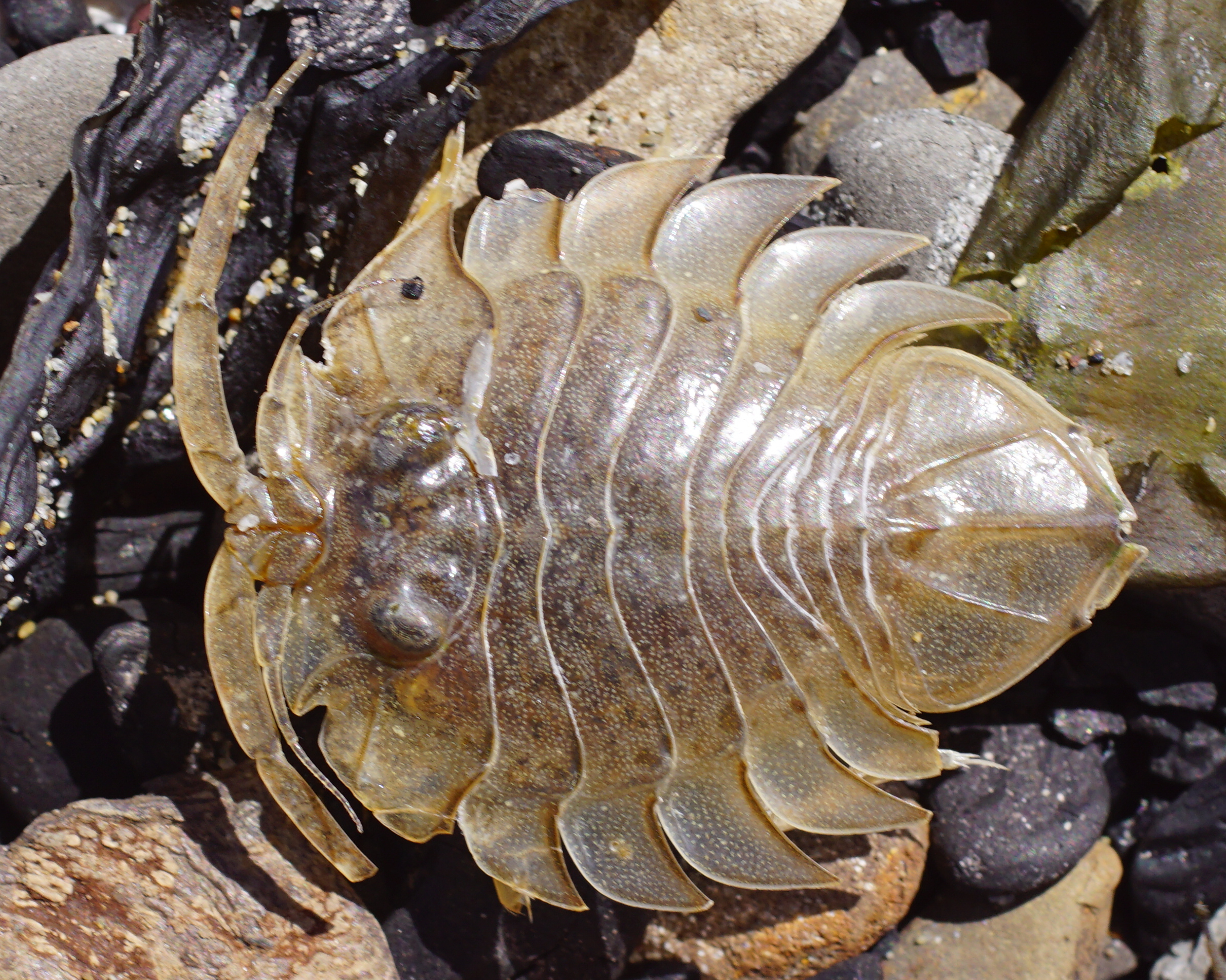
An unidentified (dried) marine serolid isopod seen on the shore in Punta Arenas, Chile. About 3–4 cm in length.
