= List of the prehistoric life of North Carolina =

This list of the prehistoric life of North Carolina contains the various prehistoric life-forms whose fossilized remains have been reported from within the US state of North Carolina.

== Precambrian-Paleozoic ==
The Paleobiology Database records no known occurrences of Precambrian or Paleozoic fossils in North Carolina.

== Mesozoic ==
=== Selected Mesozoic taxa of North Carolina ===
- Acesta
- Acirsa
- †Adocus
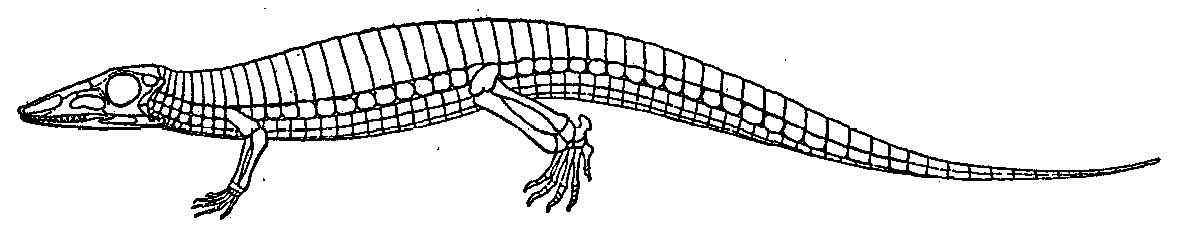
- Illustration of the reconstructed skeleton of the Late Triassic Aetosaurus. Othniel Charles Marsh (1895).
  †Aetosaurus
- †Ampullina – tentative report
- †Anomia
- †Anomoeodus
- †Apatopus
- †Arca
- Architectonica
- †Arganodus
- Astarte – tentative report
- †Asteracanthus
- †Atreipus
- †Baena – tentative report
- †Baikuris – report made of unidentified related form or using admittedly obsolete nomenclature
- Barbatia
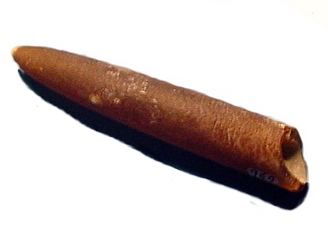
- Fossilized guard of the Late Cretaceous belemnoid cephalopod Belemnitella
  †Belemnitella
  - †Belemnitella americana
- †Borealosuchus
  - †Borealosuchus formidabilis
- †Boreogomphodon
  - †Boreogomphodon jeffersoni
- Botula
  - †Botula carolinensis
- †Brachymeris
- †Brachyphyllum
- Caestocorbula
  - †Caestocorbula crassiplica
- Candona
- Carcharias – tentative report
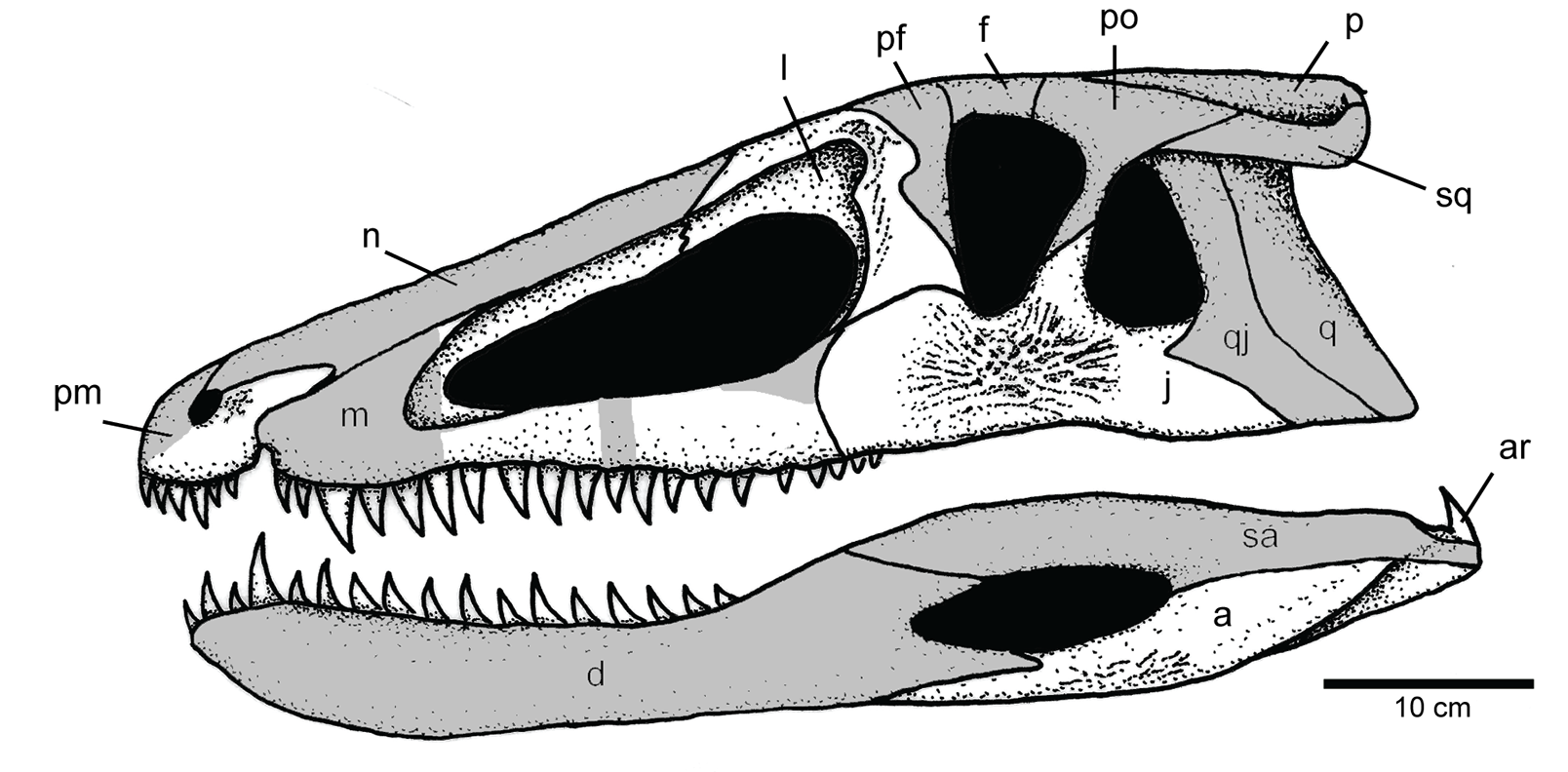
- Known material diagram illustrating a reconstructed skull and body of the Late Triassic distant crocodilian relative Carnufex
  †Carnufex – type locality for genus
  - †Carnufex carolinensis – type locality for species
- Cerithiella
  - †Cerithiella nodoliratum
  - †Cerithiella semirugatum
- †Cimolomys
- Cladophlebis
- Cliona
- †Coahomasuchus
- †Colognathus
- Corbula
- †Crenella
  - †Crenella serica
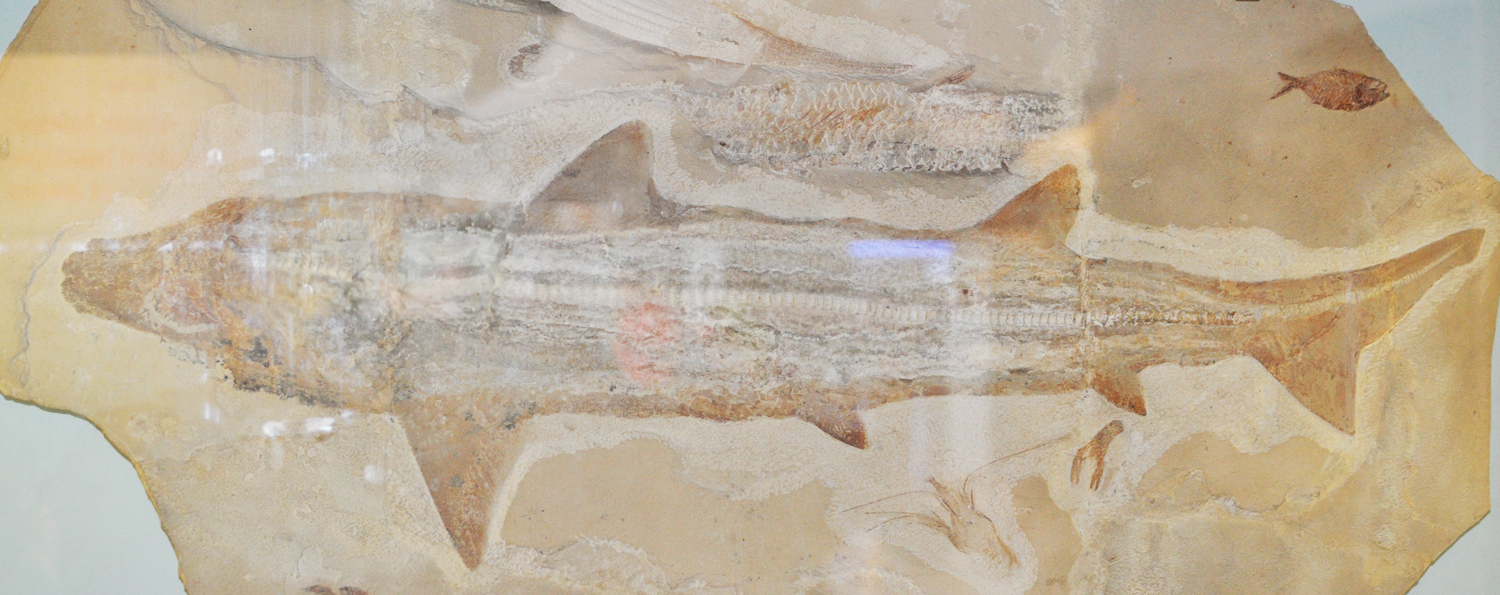
- Fossil of the Early Cretaceous-Eocene shark Cretolamna
  †Cretolamna
- †Crosbysaurus
- Cucullaea
  - †Cucullaea capax
- Cylichna
- †Cylindracanthus
- †Cymella
- Cyzicus
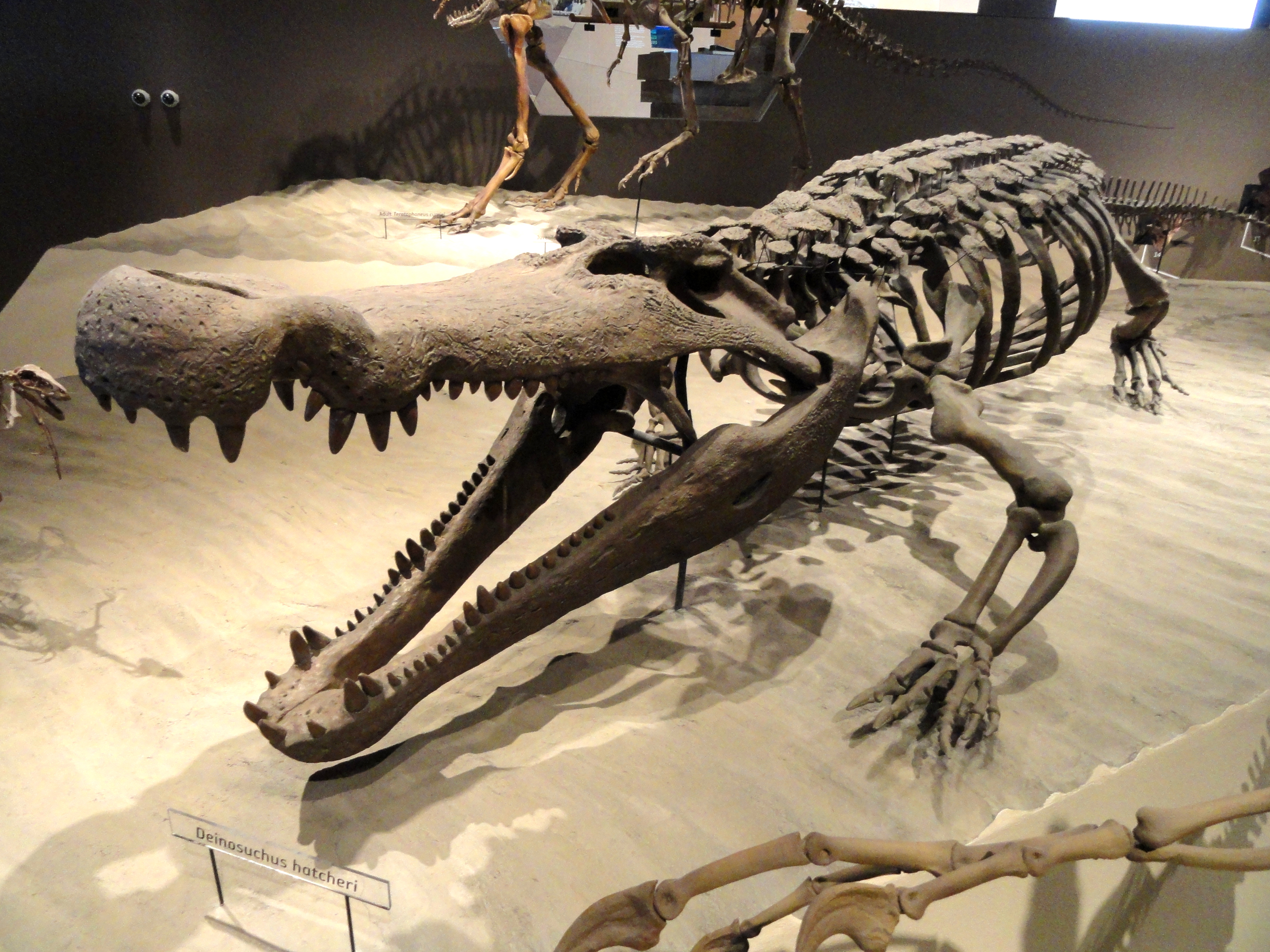
- Mounted fossilized skeleton of the Late Cretaceous Alligator relative Deinosuchus
  †Deinosuchus
  - †Deinosuchus rugosus
- Dictyocephalus – type locality for genus
- †Diplurus
- †Dreissena – tentative report
- †Dromicosuchus – type locality for genus
  - †Dromicosuchus grallator – type locality for species
- †Egertonia
- †Enchodus
  - †Enchodus petrosus – or unidentified comparable form
- †Equisetum
- †Estheria
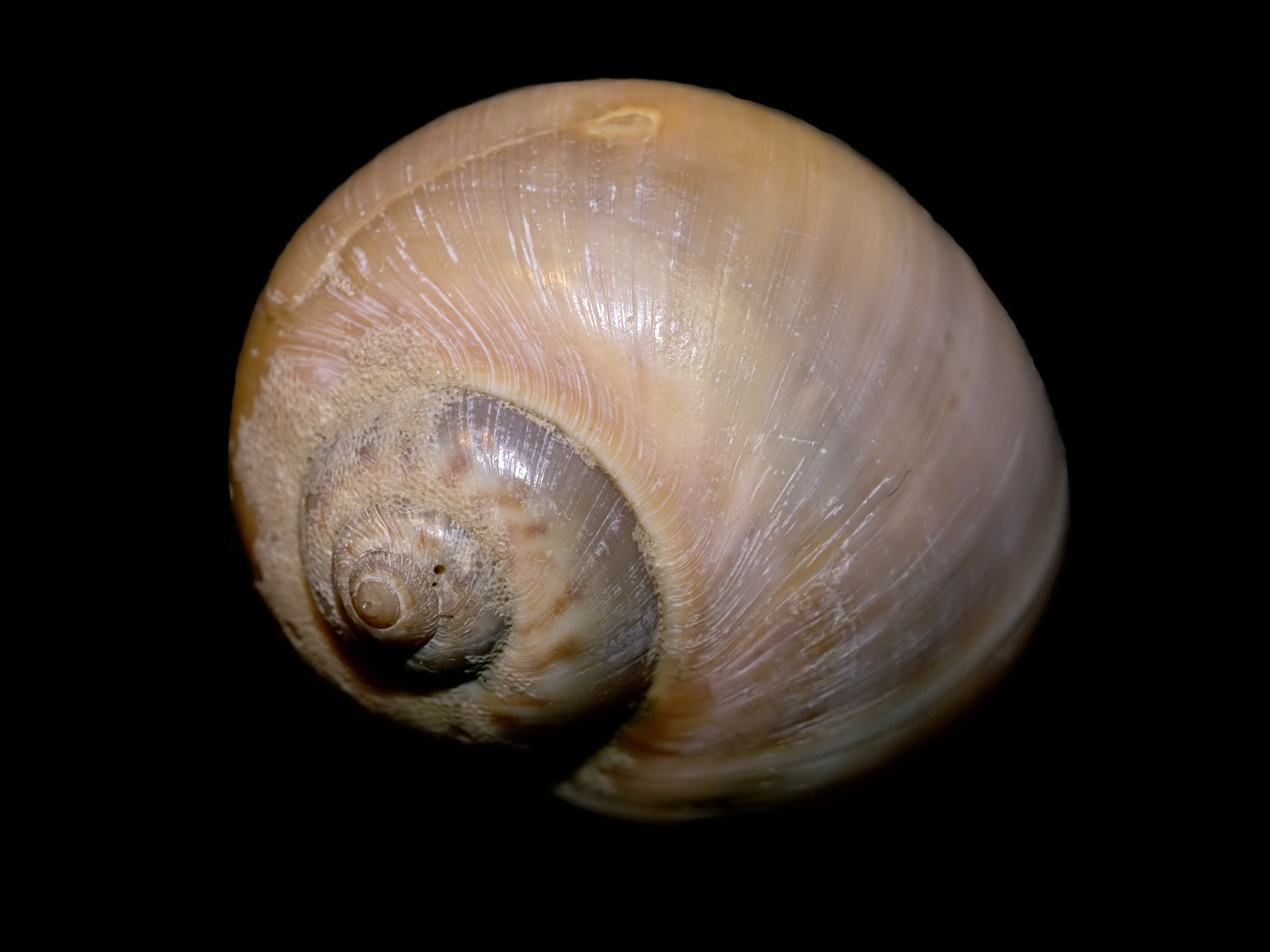
- Shell of a Euspira moon sea snail
  †Euspira
- †Eutrephoceras
- †Exogyra
  - †Exogyra cancellata
  - †Exogyra costata
- Gegania
- Glycymeris
- †Gorgetosuchus – type locality for genus
- †Gorgosaurus
- †Hadrosaurus
  - †Hadrosaurus minor – tentative report
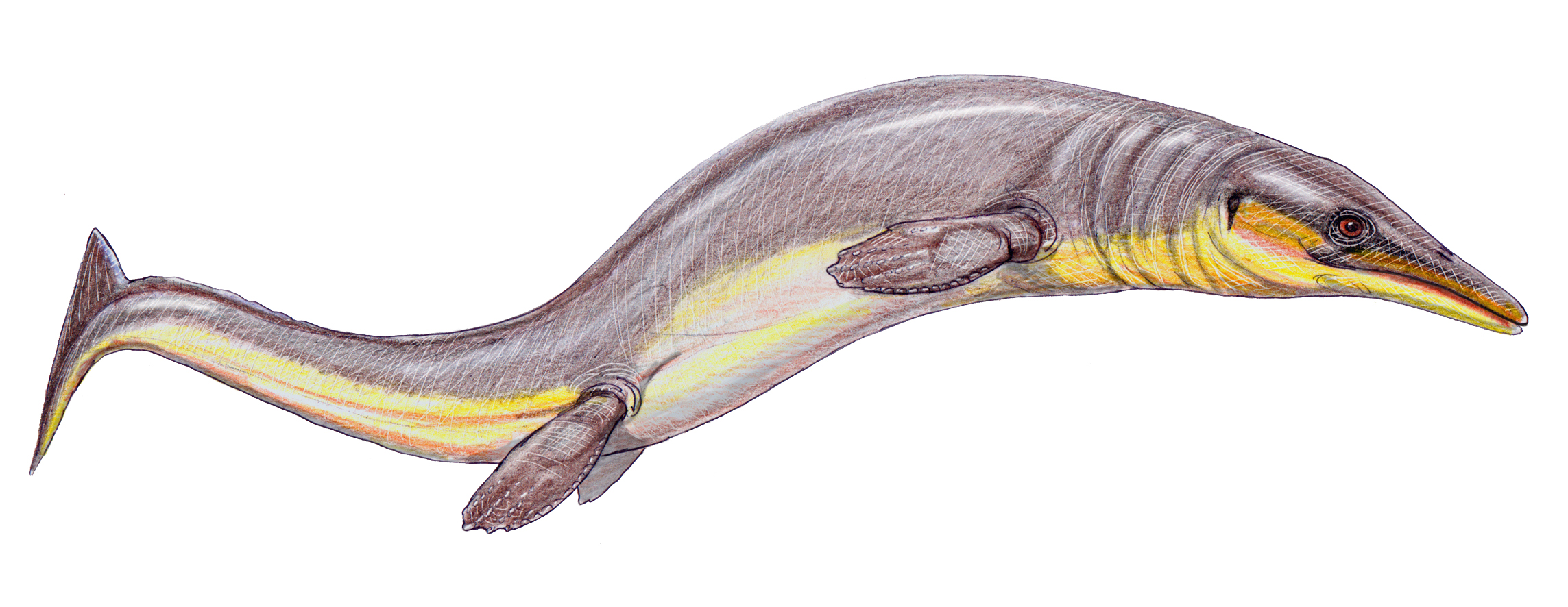
- Life restoration of the Late Cretaceous mosasaur Halisaurus
  †Halisaurus
- †Hamulus
- †Hybodus
  - †Hybodus montanensis
- †Hypophylloceras
- †Hypsibema – type locality for genus
  - †Hypsibema crassicauda – type locality for species
- †Inoceramus
- †Ischyodus
  - †Ischyodus bifurcatus – or unidentified comparable form
- †Ischyrhiza
  - †Ischyrhiza mira
- Isognomon
- Isurus
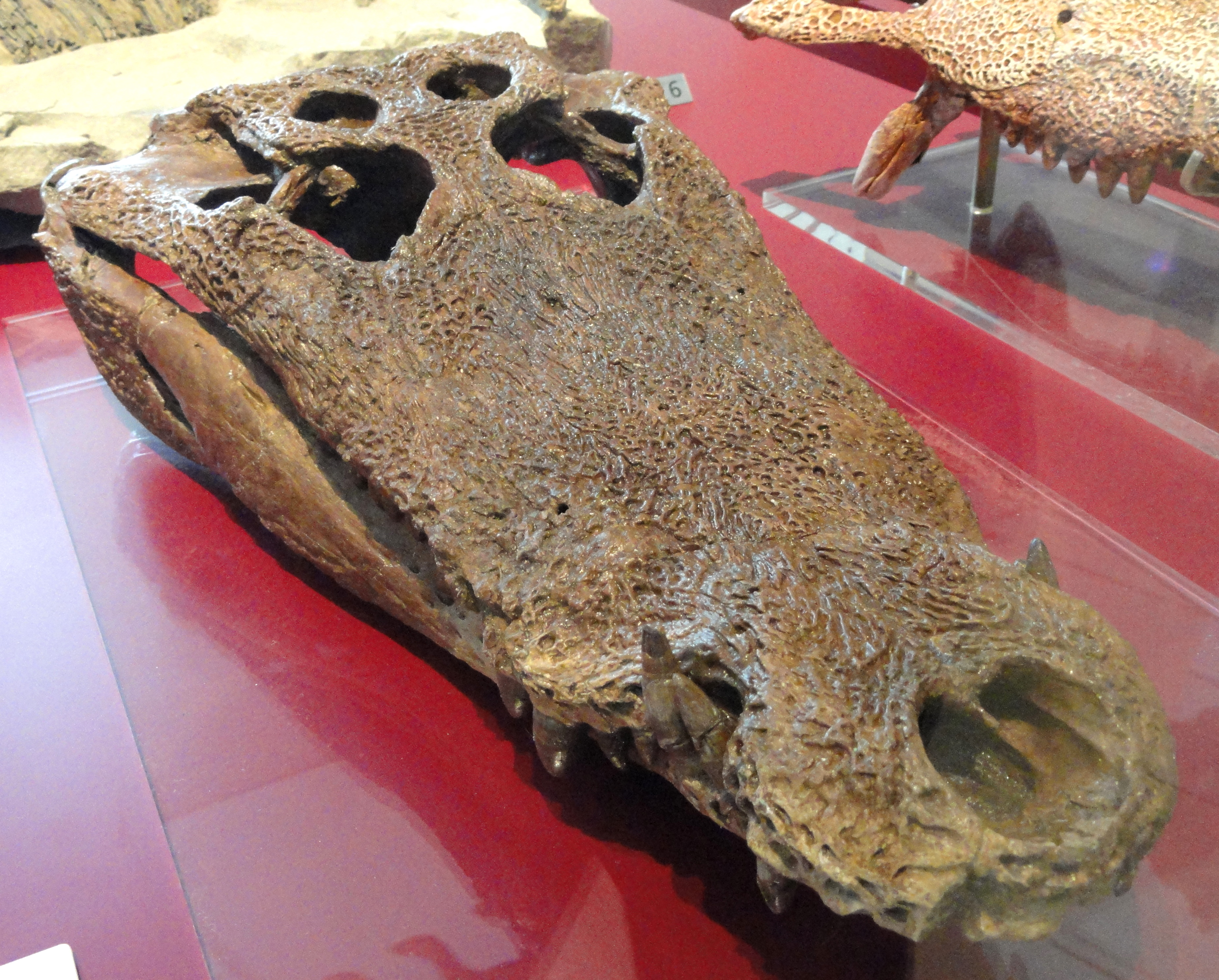
- Fossilized skull of the Late Cretaceous alligator relative Leidyosuchus
  †Leidyosuchus – tentative report
- †Lepidodendron
- Lima
- Limatula
- †Linearis
- †Lingula
- †Linthia
- Lopha
  - †Lopha falcata
- †Lucasuchus
  - †Lucasuchus hunti
- †Lucina
- †Lytoceras
- Martesia – tentative report
- †Mecistotrachelos
  - †Mecistotrachelos apeoros
- Melanatria – tentative report
- †Morea
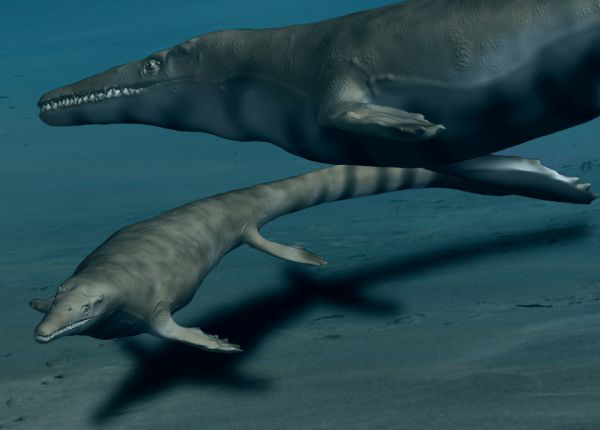
- Life restoration of two of the Late Cretaceous Mosasaurus
  †Mosasaurus
- †Neocalamites
- Nerita
- Nucula
- Odontaspis
- †Ornithomimus – tentative report
- Ostrea
- †Pagiophyllum
- †Pannaulika
- Panopea
- †Paralbula
- †Paranomia
- †Pekinosaurus – type locality for genus
  - †Pekinosaurus olseni – type locality for species
- Pholadidea – tentative report
- Pholadomya
- Phyllodus
- †Pinna
- †Placenticeras – tentative report
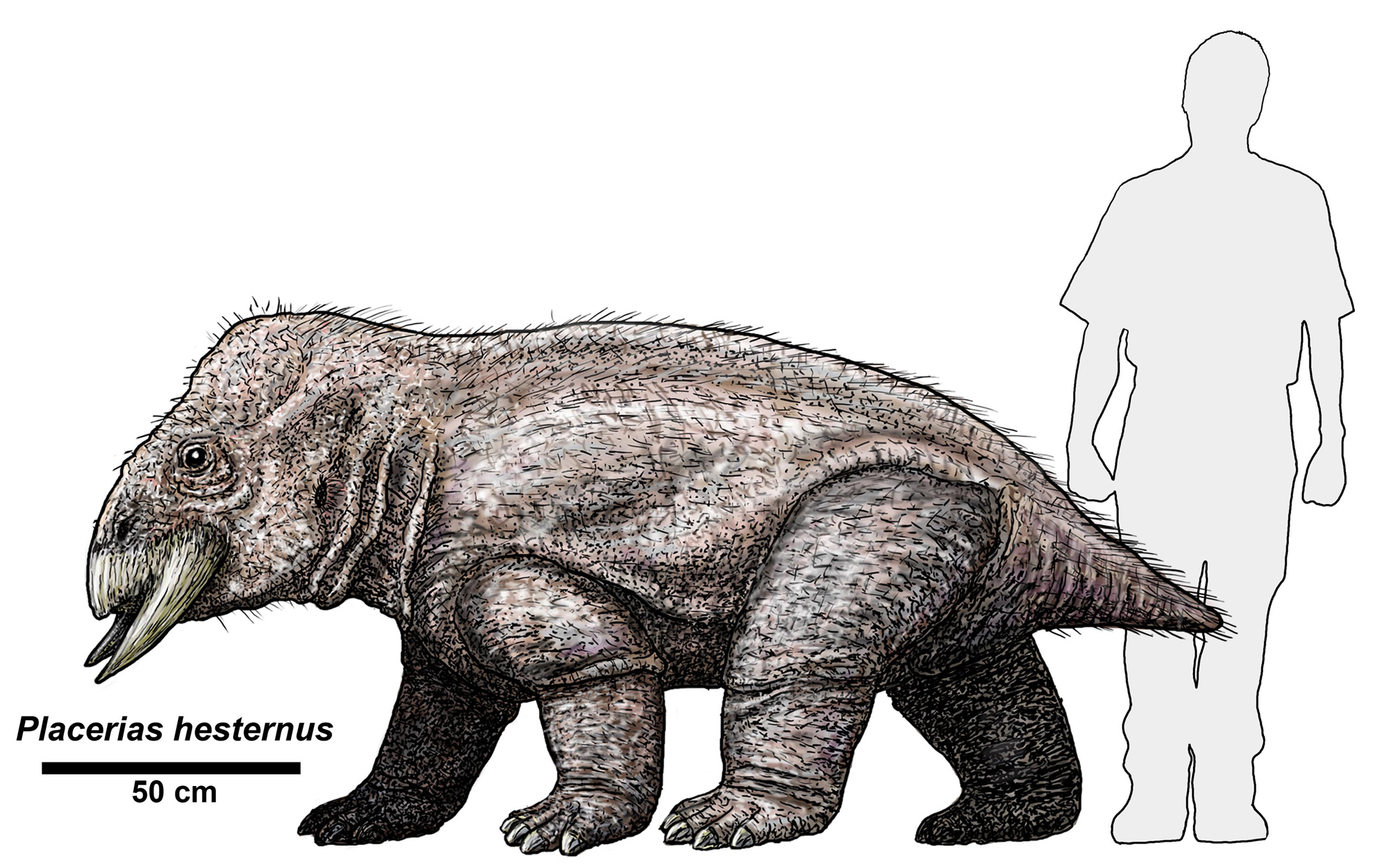
- Restoration of the Late Triassic synapsid (mammal precursor) Placerias with an anachronistic human to scale
  †Placerias
  - †Placerias hesternus
- †Platecarpus
- †Plinthogomphodon – type locality for genus
  - †Plinthogomphodon herpetairus – type locality for species
- Polinices
- †Postosuchus
  - †Postosuchus alisonae – type locality for species
- †Prognathodon
- †Protocardia
- †Pteria – tentative report
- †Pterophyllum
- †Pterotrigonia
  - †Pterotrigonia cerulea
  - †Pterotrigonia eufalensis
  - †Pterotrigonia eufaulensis
- Pycnodonte
  - †Pycnodonte belli
  - †Pycnodonte vesicularis
- †Revueltosaurus
  - †Revueltosaurus olseni
- †Rhombodus
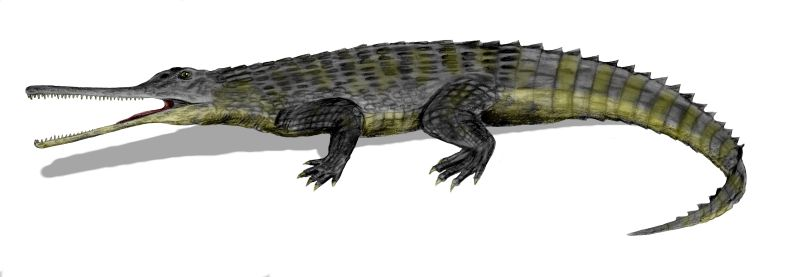
- Life restoration of the Late Triassic phytosaur Rutiodon
  †Rutiodon – type locality for genus
  - †Rutiodon carolinensis – type locality for species
- †Saurodon
- †Scapanorhynchus
  - †Scapanorhynchus texanus
- †Scoyenia – tentative report
- †Semionotus
- Serpula
- †Sphenodiscus
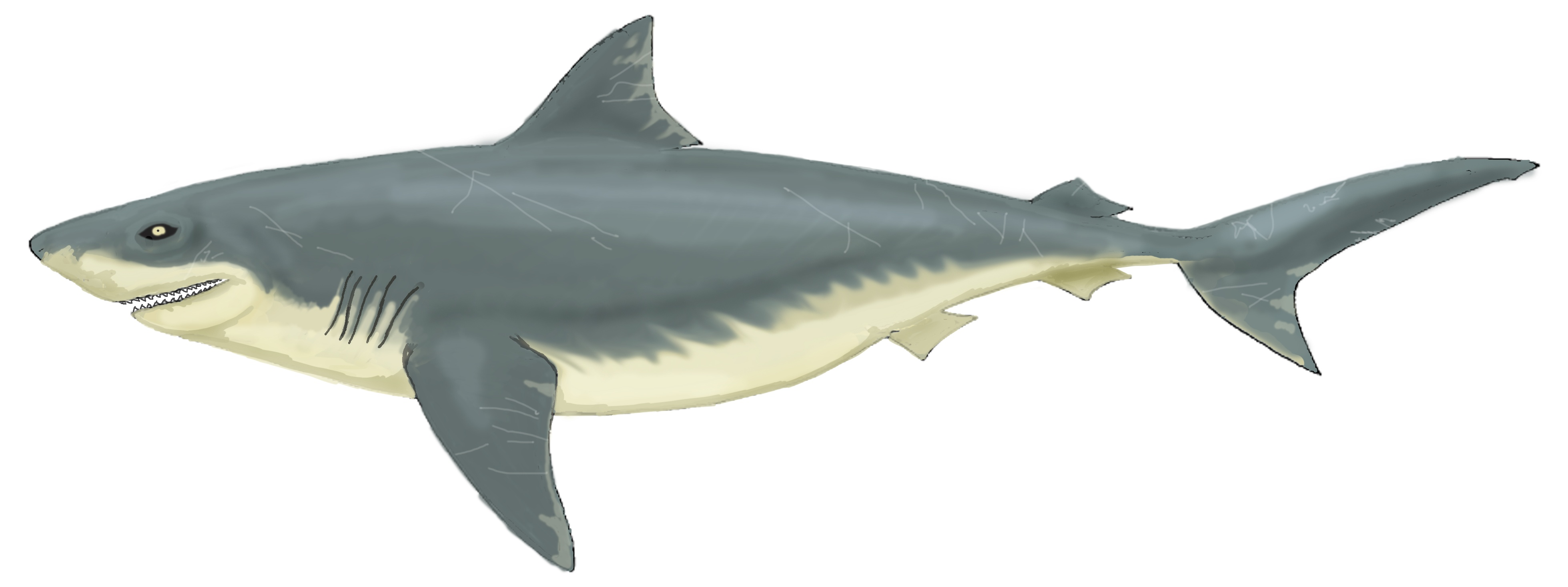
- Life restoration of the Late Cretaceous shark Squalicorax
  Squalicorax
  - †Squalicorax kaupi
  - †Squalicorax pristodontus
- Squatina
- †Stegomus
- †Stephanodus
- †Tanytrachelos – type locality for genus
  - †Tanytrachelos ahynis – type locality for species
- Trachycardium
- Trichotropis
- †Trigonia – tentative report
- Trionyx
- Turritella
  - †Turritella trilira
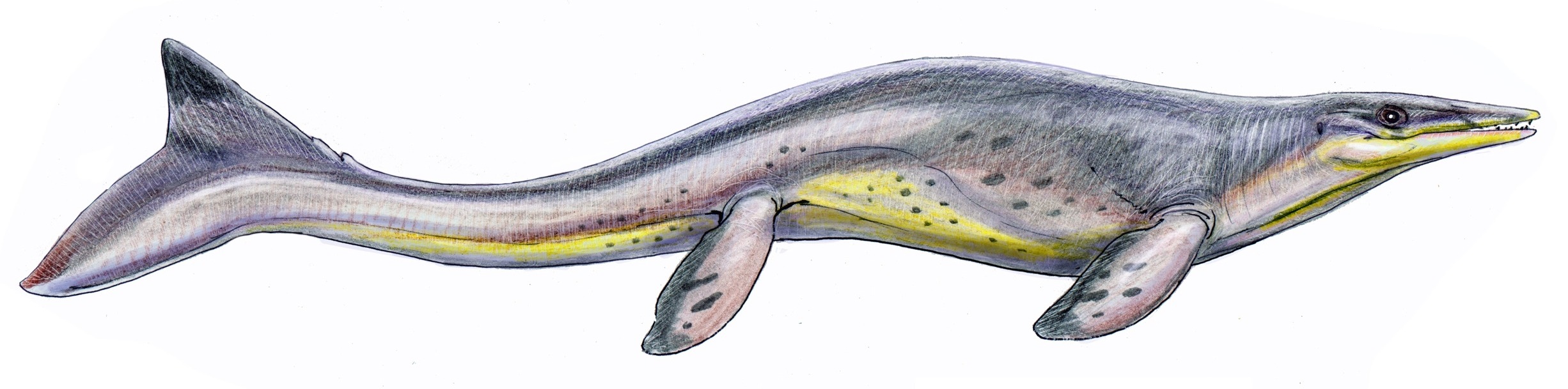
- Restoration of the Late Cretaceous mosasaur Tylosaurus
  †Tylosaurus
- †Uatchitodon
  - †Uatchitodon schneideri – type locality for species
- †Williamsonia
- †Xiphactinus
  - †Xiphactinus audax
- †Zamites
  - †Zamites powelli

== Cenozoic ==
=== Selected Cenozoic taxa of North Carolina ===
- Abies
- †Abies
- †Abra
- Acanthocybium
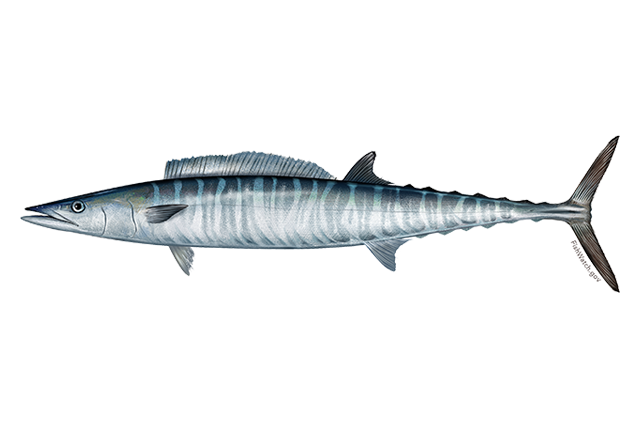
  - A living Acanthocybium solandri, or wahoo
    †Acanthocybium solandri
- †Acantholambrus
  - †Acantholambrus baumi
- †Acarinina
- Acipenser
- Acrosterigma
- Acteocina
- †Actinocyclus
- Aequipecten
- Aesopus
  - †Aesopus stearnsii
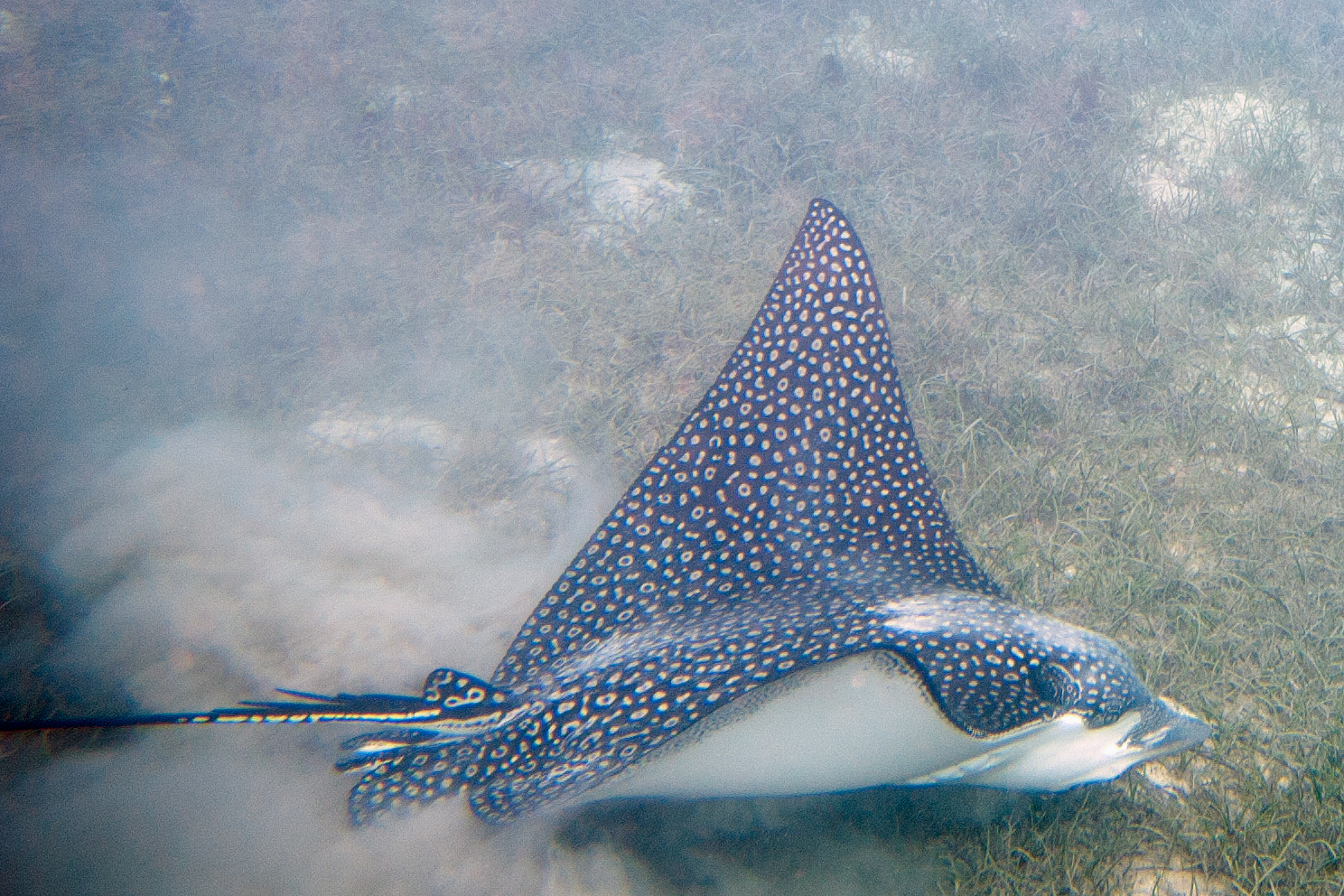
- A living Aetobatus eagle ray
  Aetobatus
- Agaronia
- Agassizia
  - †Agassizia scrobiculata
- Agatrix
- †Albertocetus – type locality for genus
- Alca
  - †Alca torda – or unidentified related form
- Alnus
- Alopias
  - †Alopias superciliosus
  - †Alopias vulpinus
- Alosa
  - †Alosa sapidissima – or unidentified comparable form
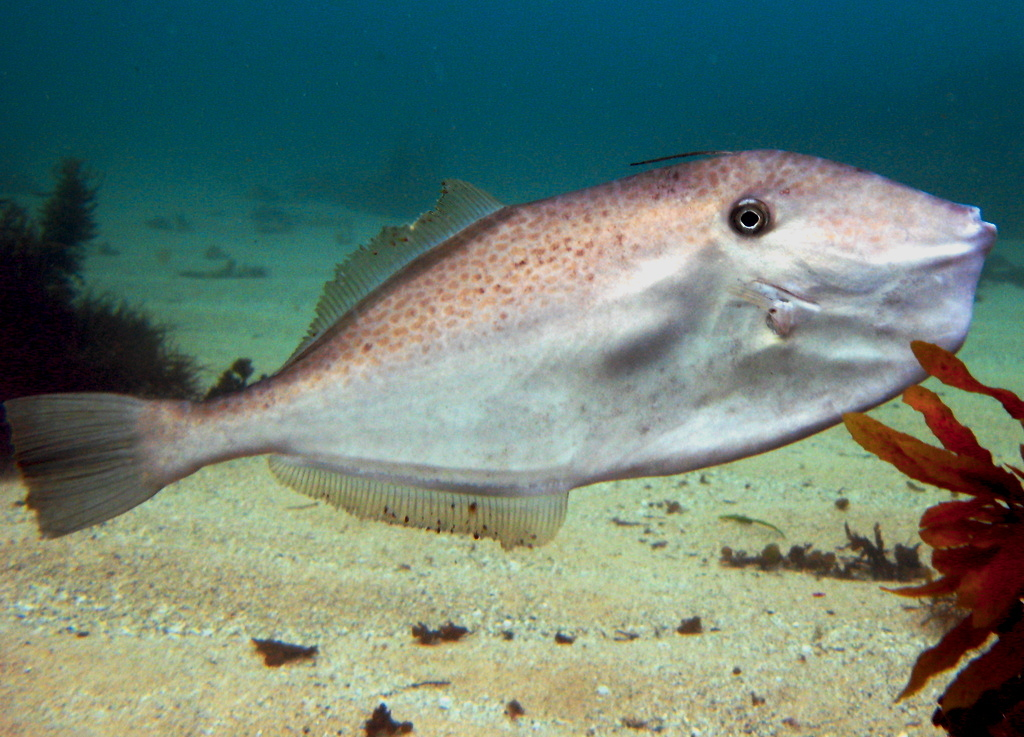
- A living Aluterus filefish
  Aluterus
- †Ambrosia
- Americardia
  - †Americardia media
- Ammodytes
- Amusium
- †Anabernicula
- Anachis
- Anadara
  - †Anadara brasiliana
  - †Anadara floridana
  - †Anadara ovalis
  - †Anadara transversa
- Anas
  - †Anas acuta
  - †Anas americana
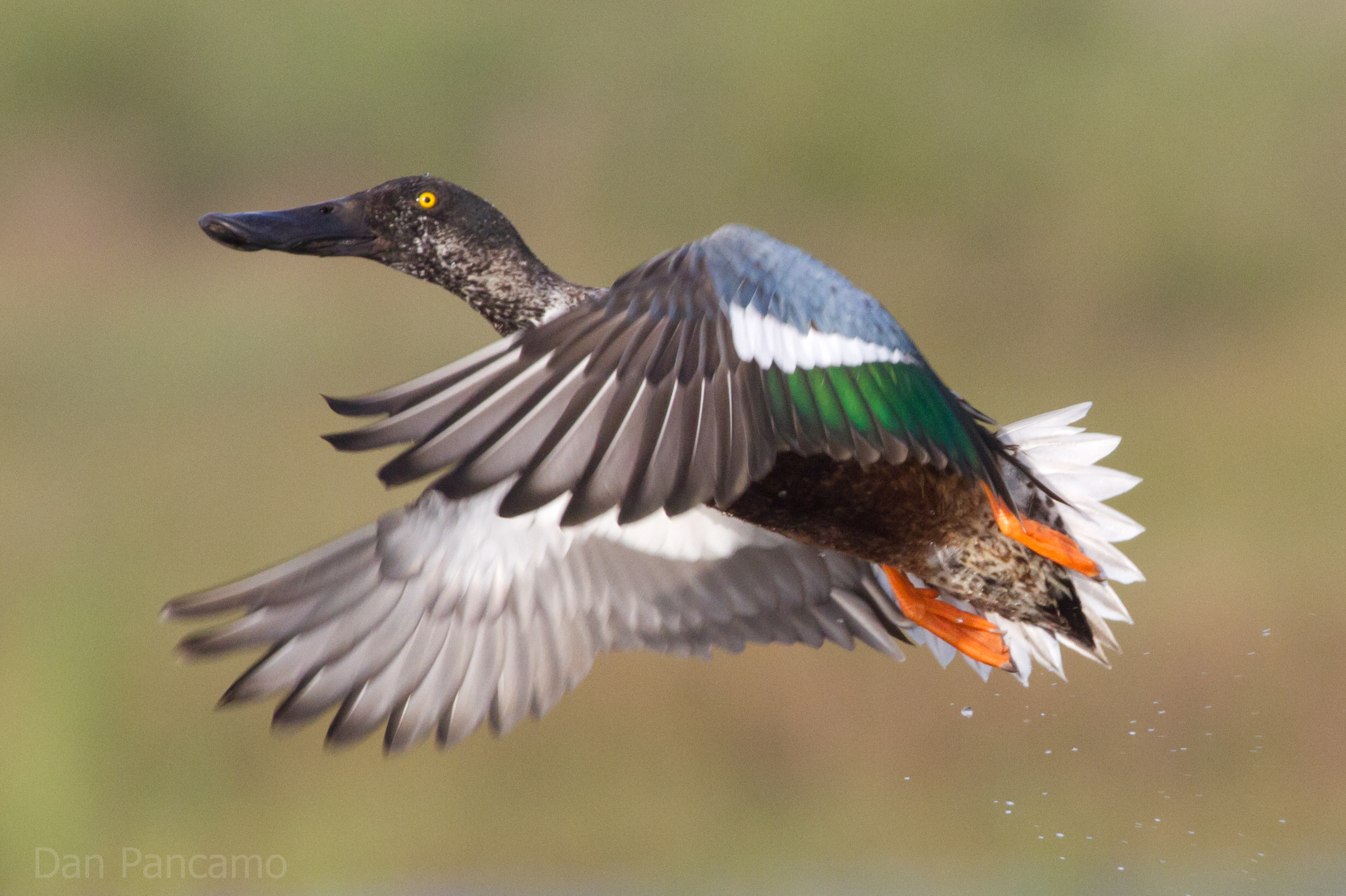
  - A living Spatula clypeata, or northern shoveler
    †Anas clypeata
  - †Anas discors
  - †Anas platyrhynchos
- Angulus
- Anisotremus
- Anodontia
  - †Anodontia alba
- Anomia
  - †Anomia simplex
- †Anomotodon
- Anser
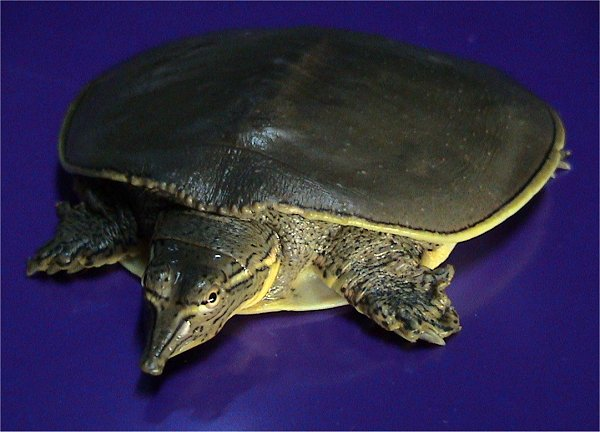
- A living Apalone softshell turtle
  Apalone – or unidentified comparable form
- †Araeodelphis
- Arbacia
- Arca
- Architectonica
- †Archosargus
  - †Archosargus probatocephalus – or unidentified comparable form
- Arcinella
  - †Arcinella cornuta
- Ardea
  - †Ardea cinerea – or unidentified related form
- Argopecten
  - †Argopecten gibbus
  - †Argopecten irradians
- Argyrotheca
- †Artemisia
- Artena
- Astarte
- Astyris
  - †Astyris lunata
- Athleta
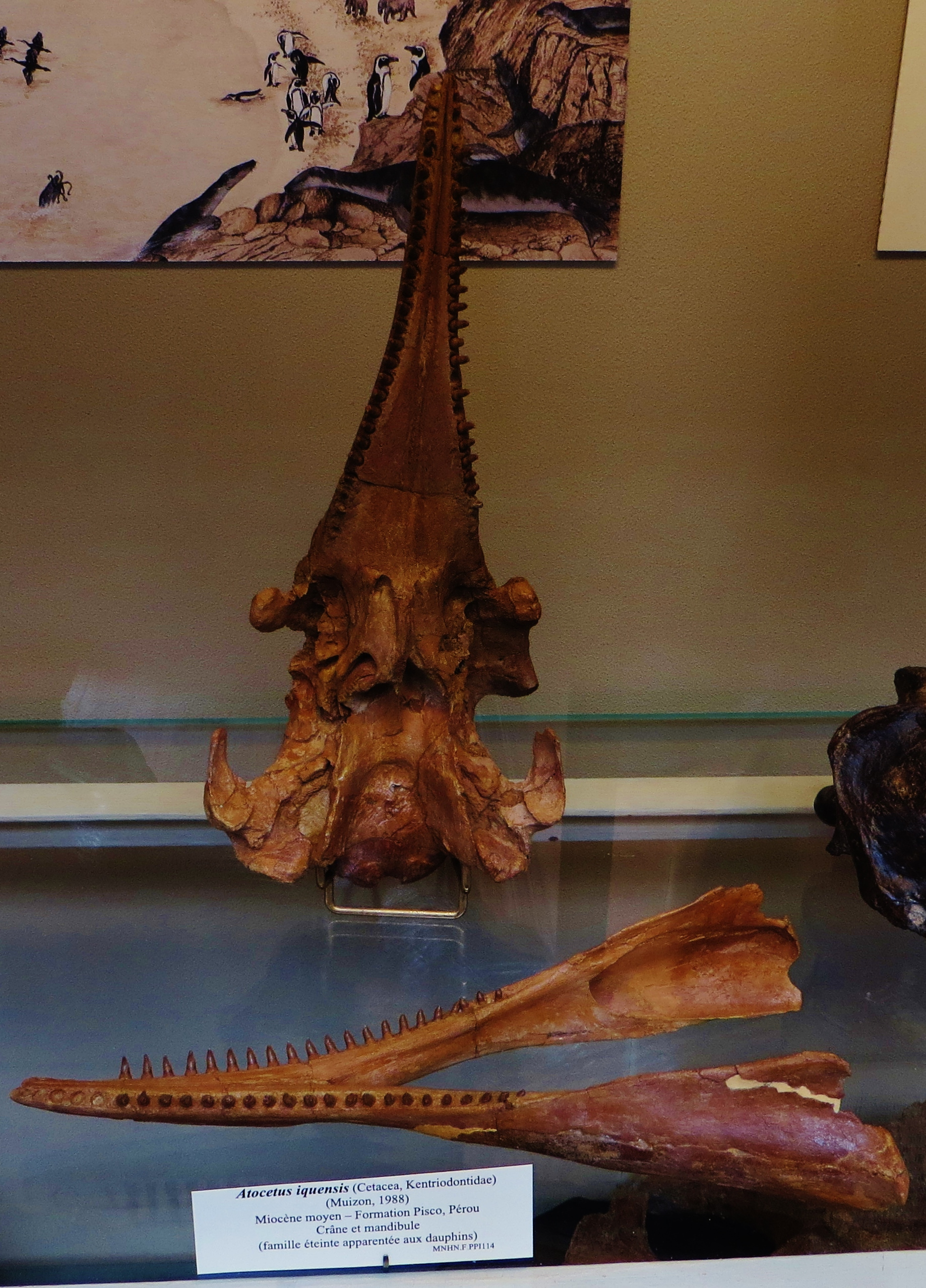
- Fossilized skull of the Miocene dolphin Atocetus
  †Atocetus – or unidentified related form
- Atrina
- †Aturia
- †Auroracetus – type locality for genus
- Auxis
- Axelella
- Aythya
  - †Aythya affinis – or unidentified related form
- Bagre
- Balaena
- Balaenoptera
  - †Balaenoptera acutorostrata
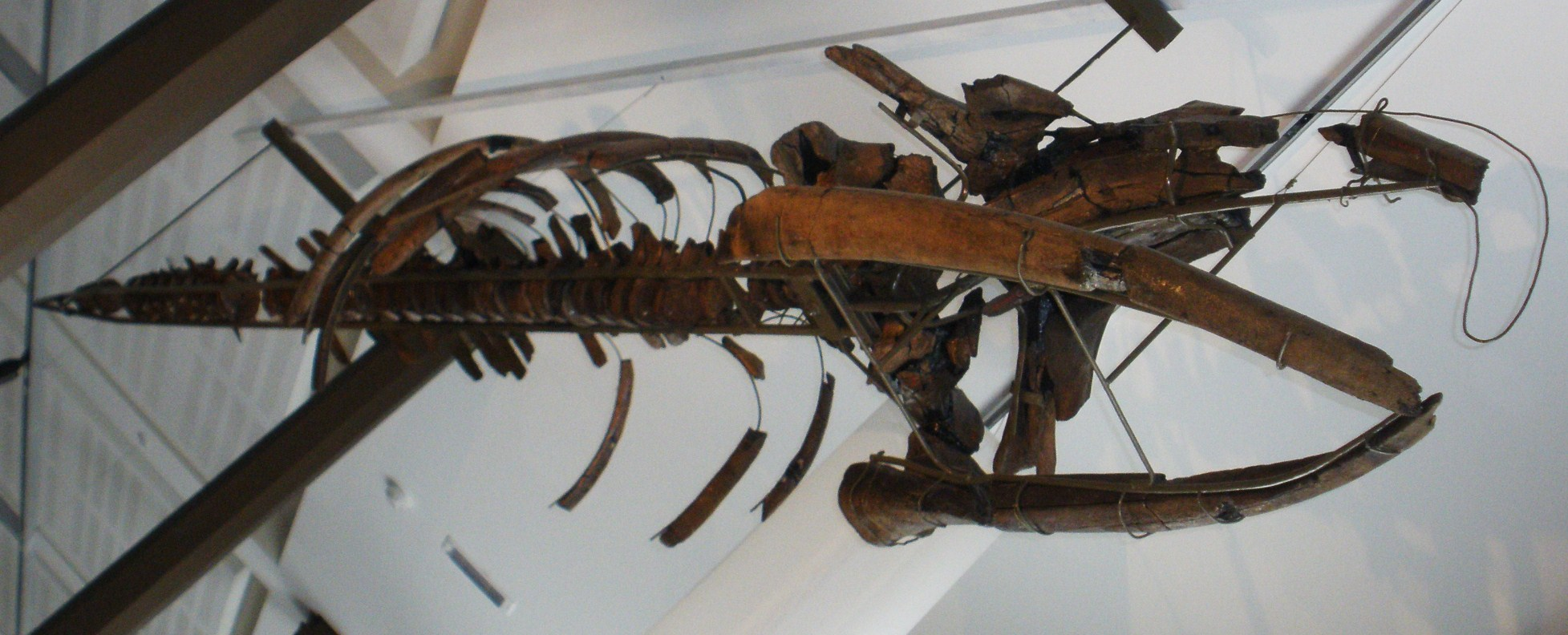
- Mounted fossilized skeleton of the Pliocene whale Balaenula
  †Balaenula
- Balanophyllia
- Balanus
- Balearica – tentative report
- Barbatia
- Barnea
- †Basilotritus
- †Belosaepia
- Betula
- Bittium
- †Bohaskaia
  - †Bohaskaia monodontoides
- Boonea
  - †Boonea impressa
  - †Boonea seminuda
- †Bootherium
  - †Bootherium bombifrons
- Boreotrophon – report made of unidentified related form or using admittedly obsolete nomenclature
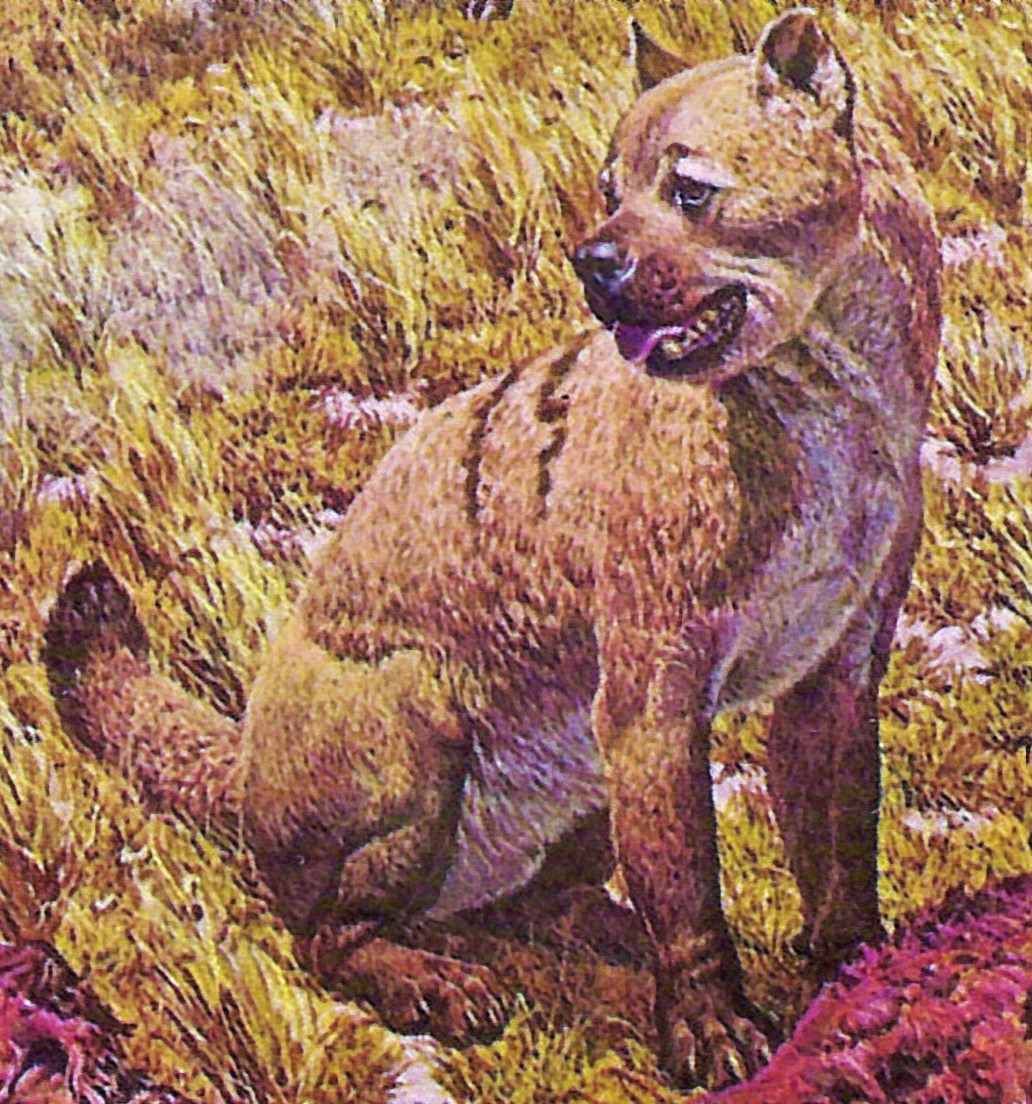
- Restoration of two of the Miocene-Pliocene bone-crushing dog genus Borophagus preying on a camel. Jay Matternes (1964).
  †Borophagus
  - †Borophagus dudleyi – or unidentified comparable form
  - †Borophagus orc – or unidentified comparable form
- Bostrycapulus
  - †Bostrycapulus aculeatus
- Botrychium
  - †Botrychium dissectum – or unidentified comparable form
- †Botryococcus
- Brachidontes
- Branta
  - †Branta bernicla – or unidentified related form
- †Brasenia
- Brotula
- Buccella
- Bucephala
  - †Bucephala albeola – or unidentified related form
  - †Bucephala clangula – or unidentified related form
- Bulweria – tentative report
- †Burnhamia
- Busycon
  - †Busycon carica
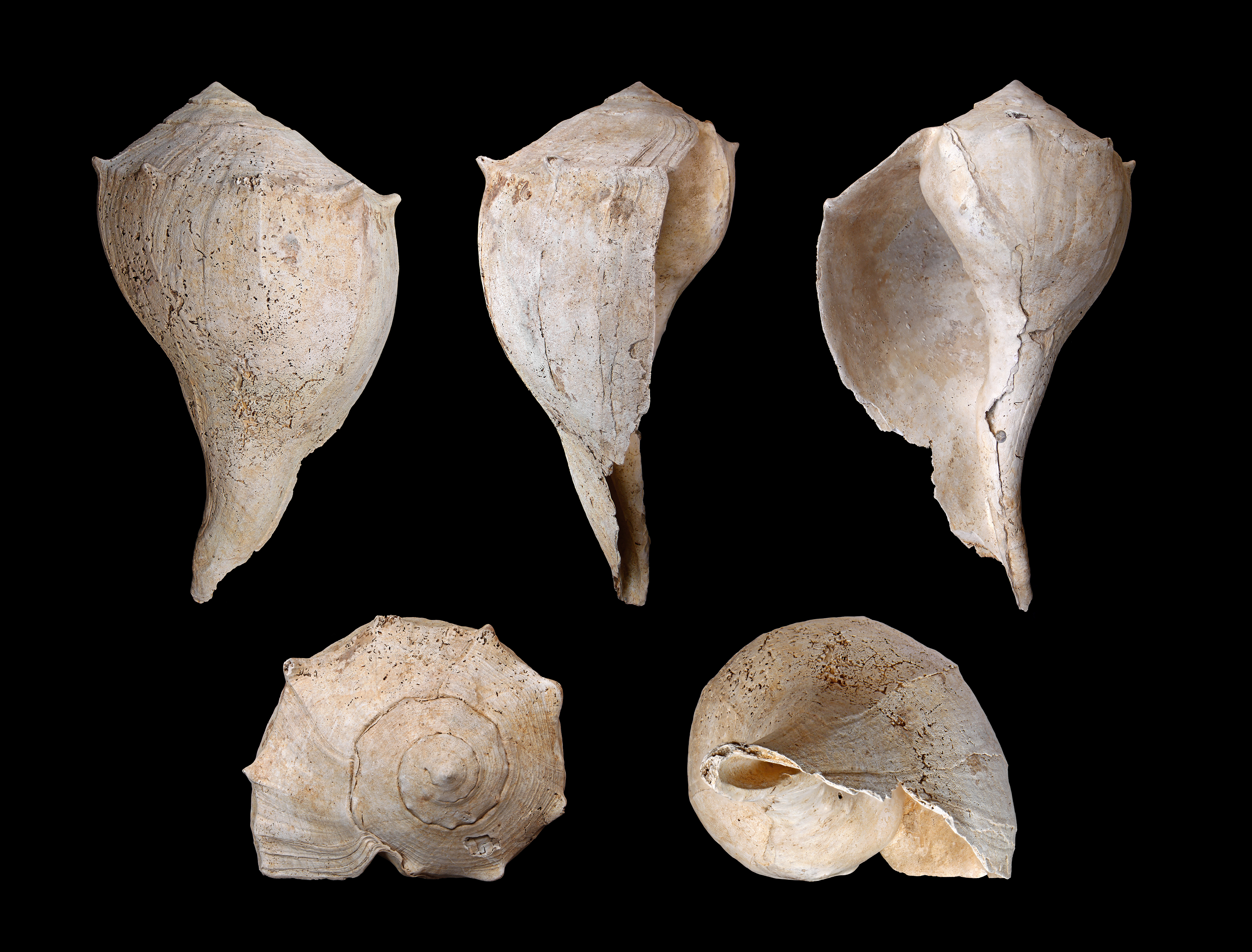
  - Shell in multiple views of a Busycon contrarium whelk
    †Busycon contrarium
  - †Busycon perversum
- Busycotypus
  - †Busycotypus canaliculatus
- Buteo
  - †Buteo jamaicensis
- Cadulus
- Caecum
  - †Caecum imbricatum
  - †Caecum pulchellum
  - †Caecum regulare
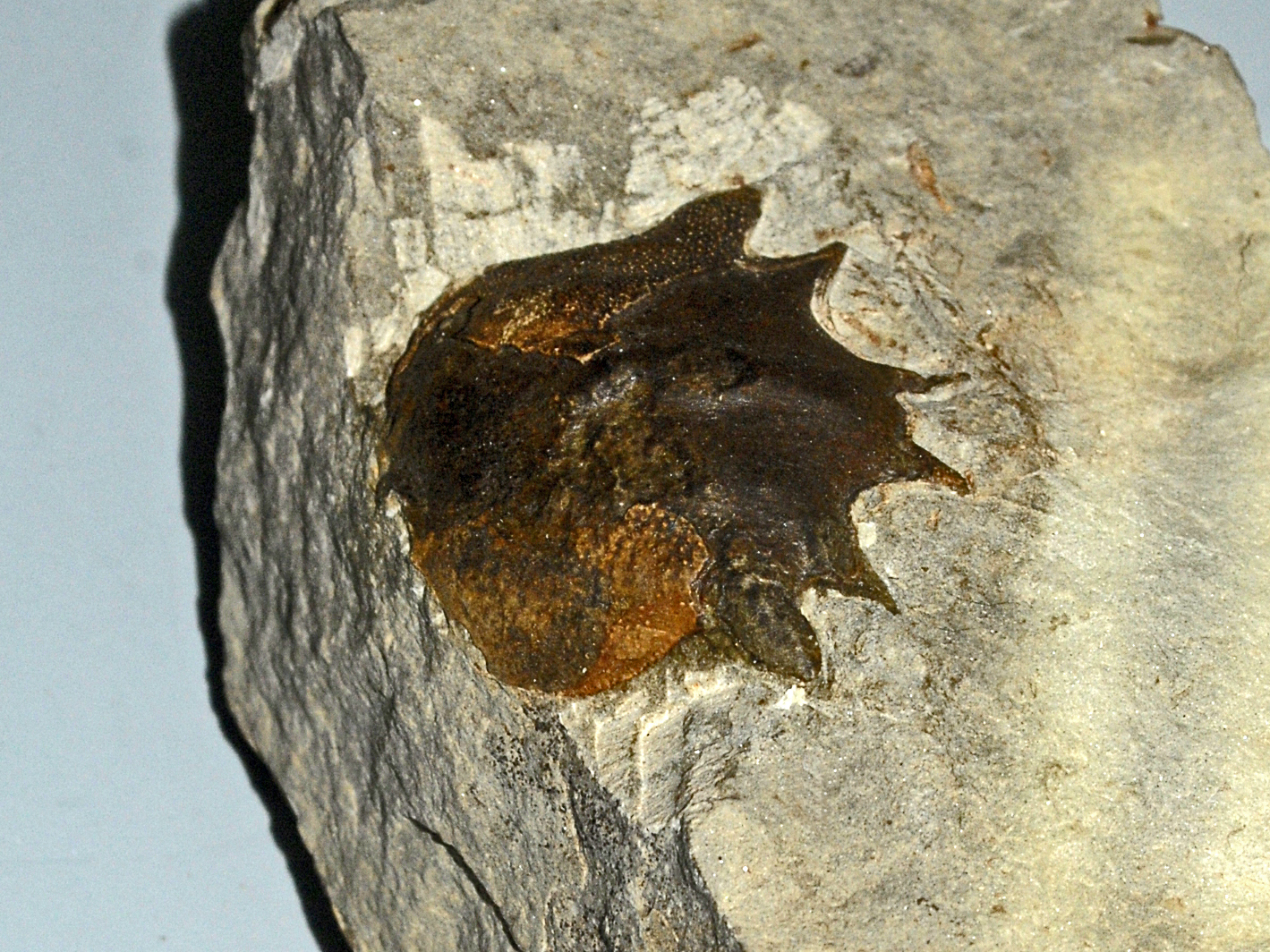
- Fossilized carapace of the Paleocene-Miocene crab Calappilia
  †Calappilia
- Calidris
  - †Calidris melanotos – or unidentified related form
- Callinectes
  - †Callinectes sapidus
- Calliostoma
- Callista
- †Callophoca
- Calonectris
  - †Calonectris borealis – or unidentified related form
  - †Calonectris diomedea – or unidentified related form
- Calotrophon
  - †Calotrophon ostrearum
- Calyptraea
  - †Calyptraea centralis
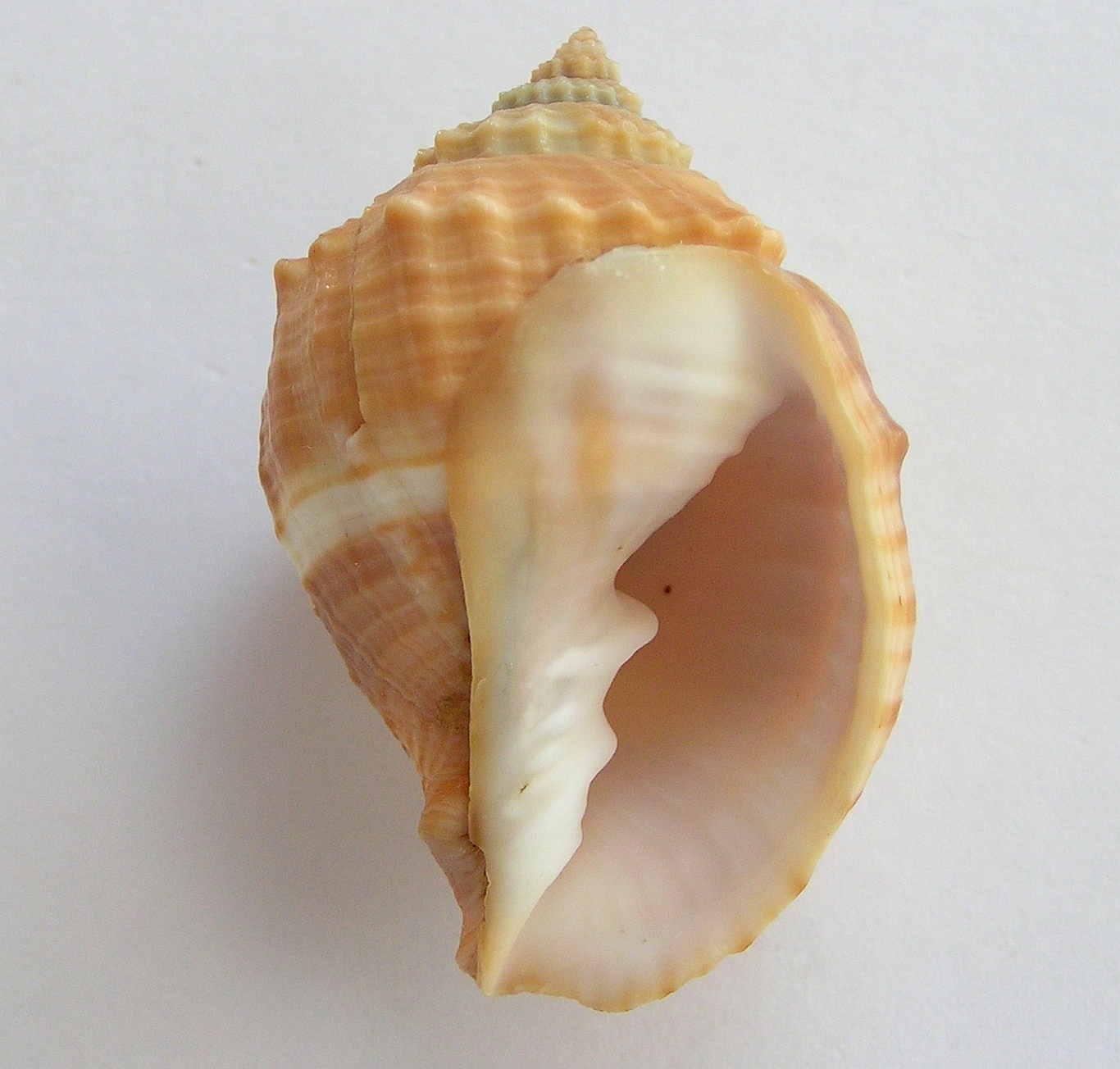
- Modern shell of a Cancellaria nutmeg snail
  Cancellaria
- Capella
  - †Capella media – or unidentified related form
- Carcharhinus
  - †Carcharhinus brachyurus
  - †Carcharhinus falciformis
  - †Carcharhinus leucas
  - †Carcharhinus macloti
  - †Carcharhinus obscurus
  - †Carcharhinus perezi
  - †Carcharhinus plumbeus
- Carcharias
  - †Carcharias taurus
- Carcharodon
  - †Carcharodon carcharias
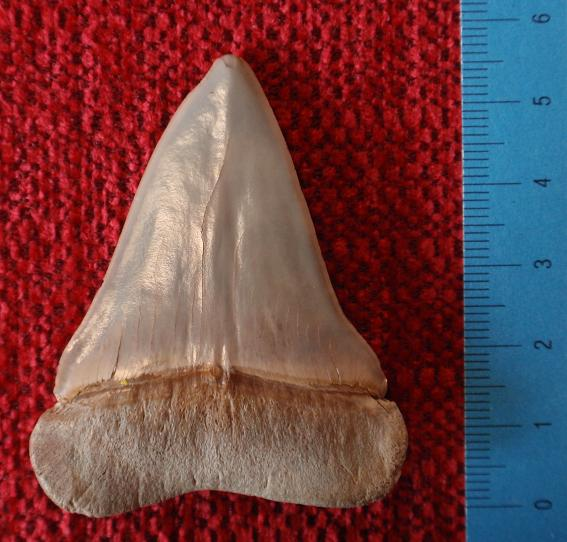
  - Fossilized tooth of the Miocene-Pliocene shark Cosmopolitodus hastalis, or broad-toothed mako
    †Carcharodon hastalis
- Carditamera
- Caretta
- Carya
- Cassidulina
- †Cassigerinella
  - †Cassigerinella chipolensis
- Cassis
- Castanea
- Catharacta
- †Caulolatilus
  - †Caulolatilus cyanops – or unidentified comparable form
- †Cavilucina
- Centropristis
  - †Centropristis striata – or unidentified comparable form
- Cerastoderma
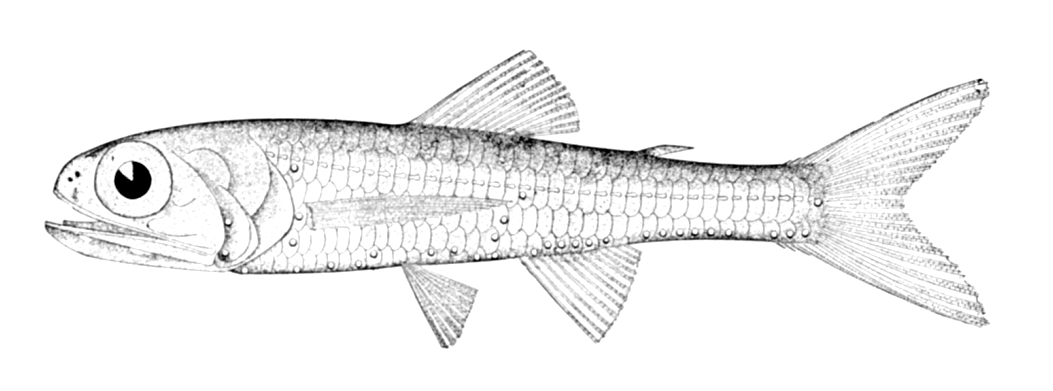
- Illustration of a living Ceratoscopelus lanternfish
  Ceratoscopelus
- Cerithiopsis
  - †Cerithiopsis vinca
- Cerithium
  - †Cerithium eburneum
- Cerodrillia – report made of unidentified related form or using admittedly obsolete nomenclature
  - †Cerodrillia simpsoni
- †Cerorhinca
- Cetorhinus
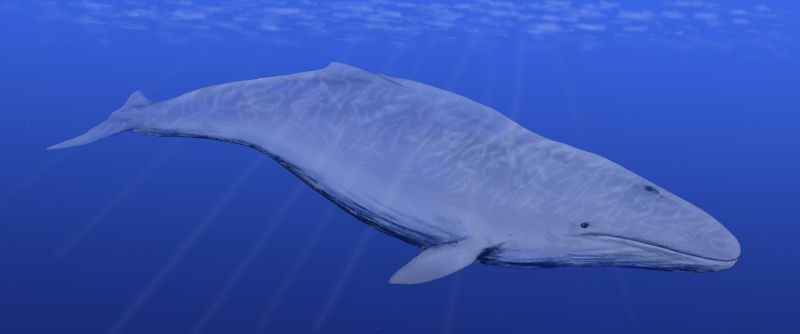
- Life restoration of the Miocene-Pliocene whale Cetotherium
  †Cetotherium
- Chaetopleura
- Chama
  - †Chama congregata
  - †Chama macerophylla
- Chamelea
- Chelonia – tentative report
- Chelonibia
- Chemnitzia
- †Chesapecten
  - †Chesapecten jeffersonius
- Chilomycterus
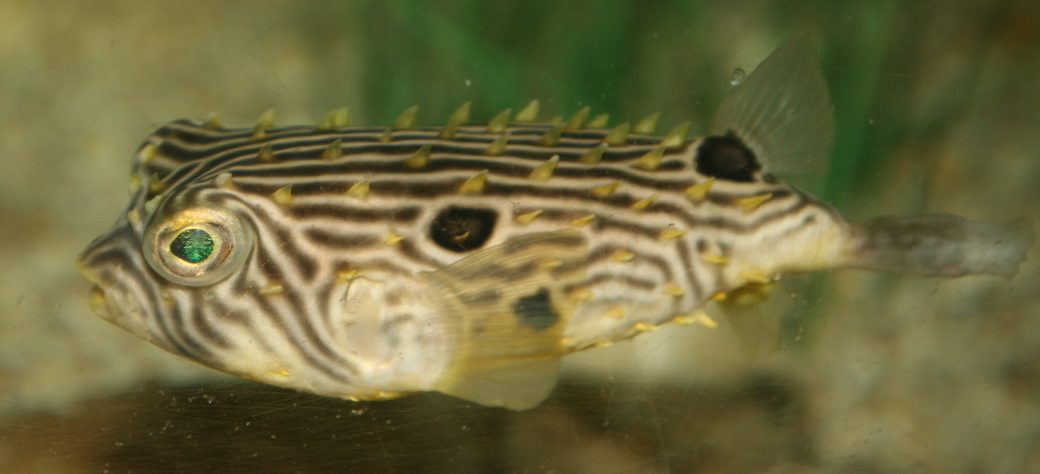
  - A living Chilomycterus schoepfi, or striped burrfish
    †Chilomycterus schoepfi
  - †Chilomycterus schoepfii
- Chione
  - †Chione cancellata
- Chlamys
- Chrysemys
- Cibicides
- Ciconia
- Cidaris
- Circulus – report made of unidentified related form or using admittedly obsolete nomenclature
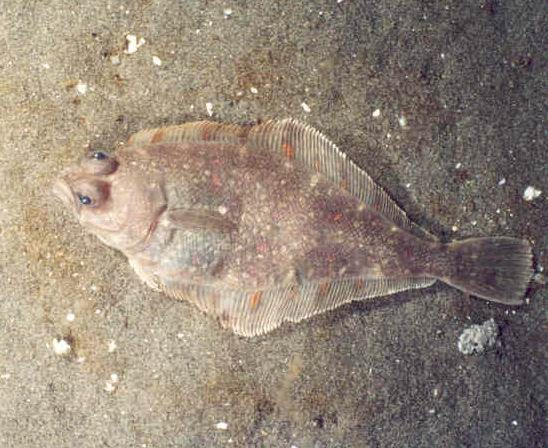
- A living Citharichthys large-tooth flounder
  Citharichthys
- Cladocora
- †Cladogramma
- Clathrodrillia – report made of unidentified related form or using admittedly obsolete nomenclature
- Clathrus
- Clavatula
- †Clavicula
- Clavilithes – or unidentified comparable form
- Clavus – report made of unidentified related form or using admittedly obsolete nomenclature
- †Claytonia – type locality for genus
- Cliona – tentative report
- Closia
- Cochliolepis
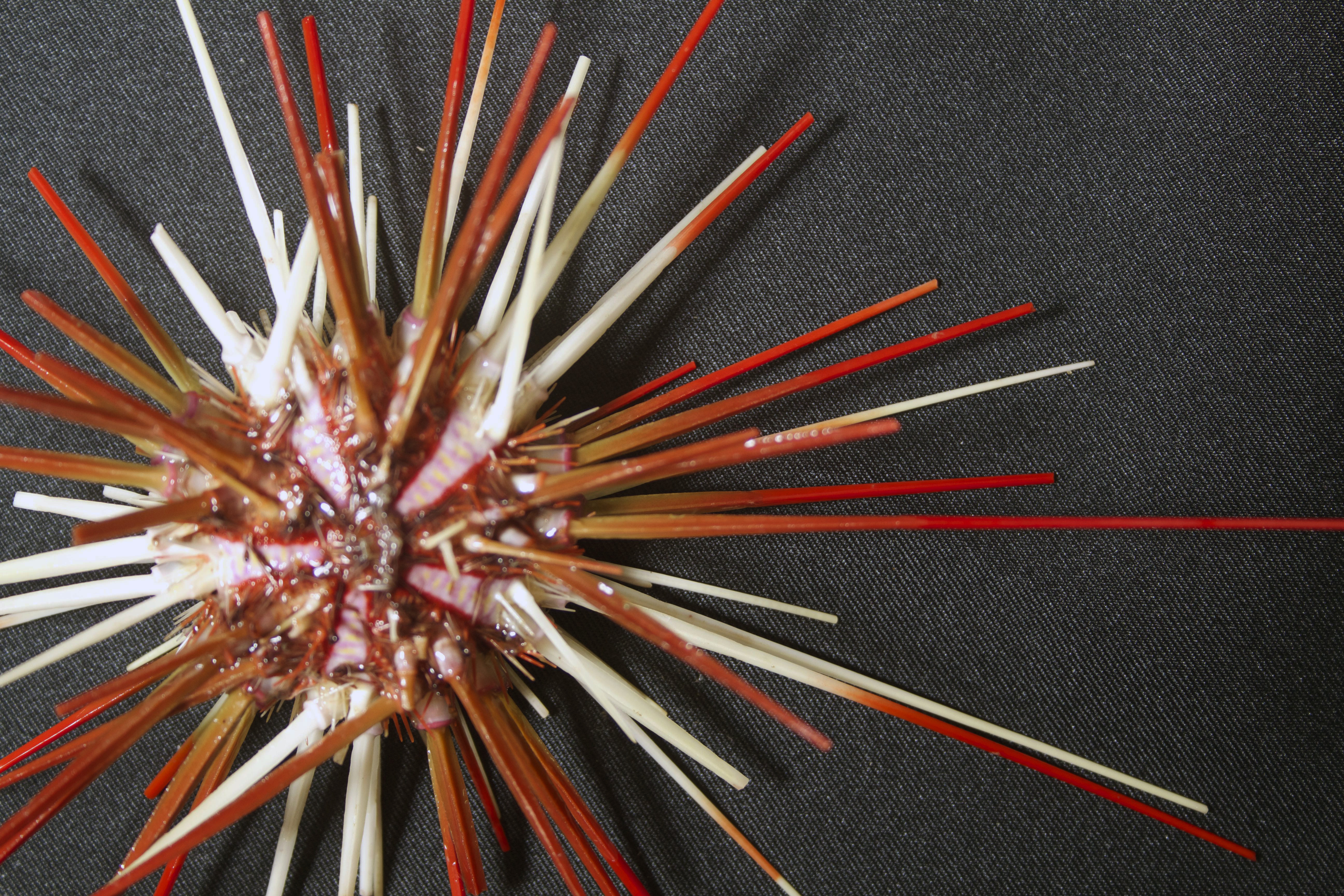
- A Coelopleurus sea urchin
  Coelopleurus
- Colubraria
- †Colymboides – tentative report
- Compsodrillia
- Concavus
- Conger
  - †Conger oceanicus – or unidentified comparable form
- Conus
- Corbicula
- Corbula
- Corvus
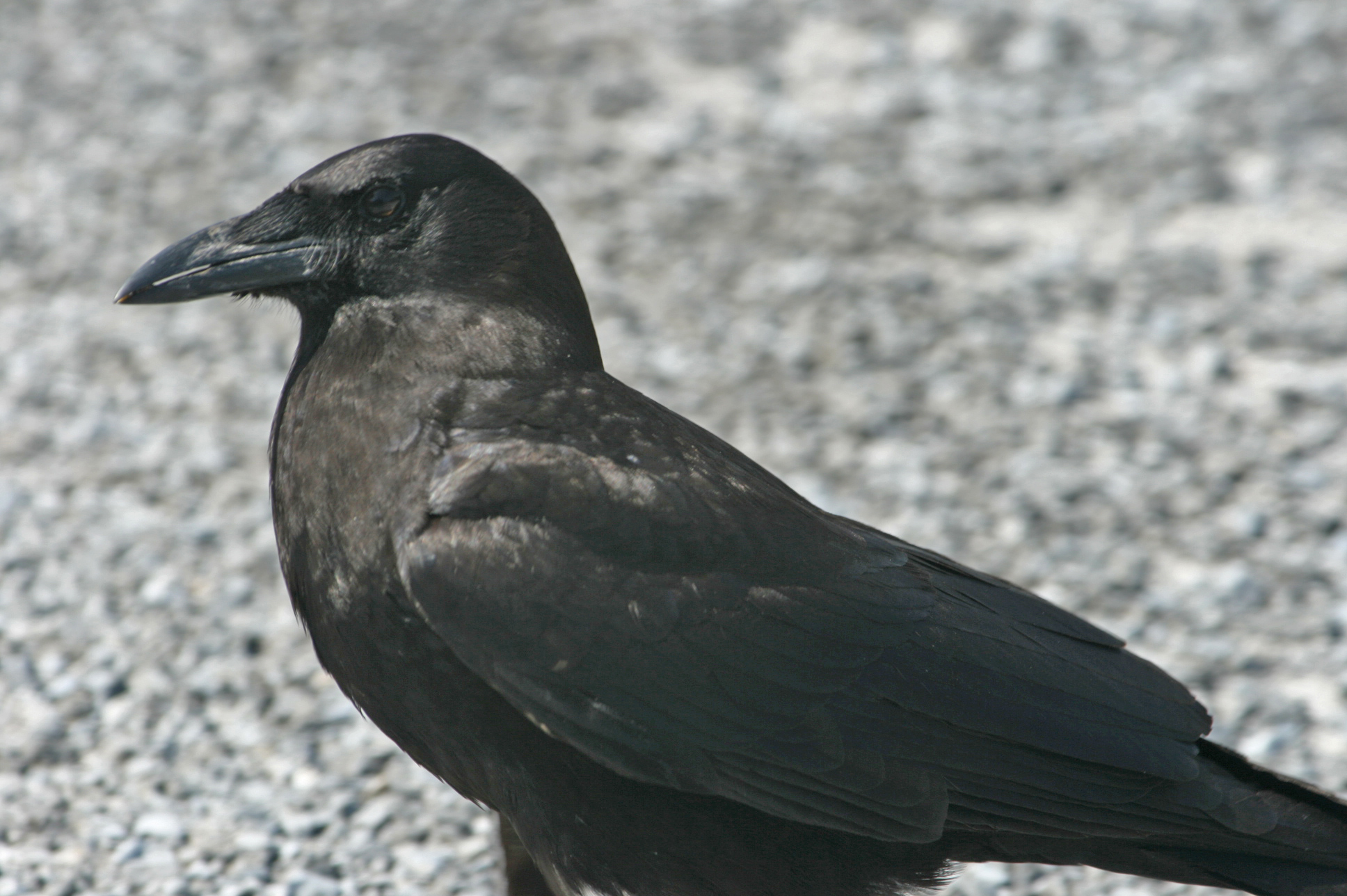
  - A living Corvus ossifragus, or fish crow
    †Corvus ossifragus – or unidentified related form
- †Corylus
- †Coscinodiscus
- †Cosmodiscus
- Cotonopsis
  - †Cotonopsis lafresnayi
- Crania
- †Craspedodiscus
  - †Crassinella lunulata
- Crassispira
- Crassostrea
  - †Crassostrea virginica
- †Crenatocetus – type locality for genus
- Crenella
- Crepidula
  - †Crepidula convexa
  - †Crepidula fornicata
  - †Crepidula plana
- Crucibulum
- Cumingia
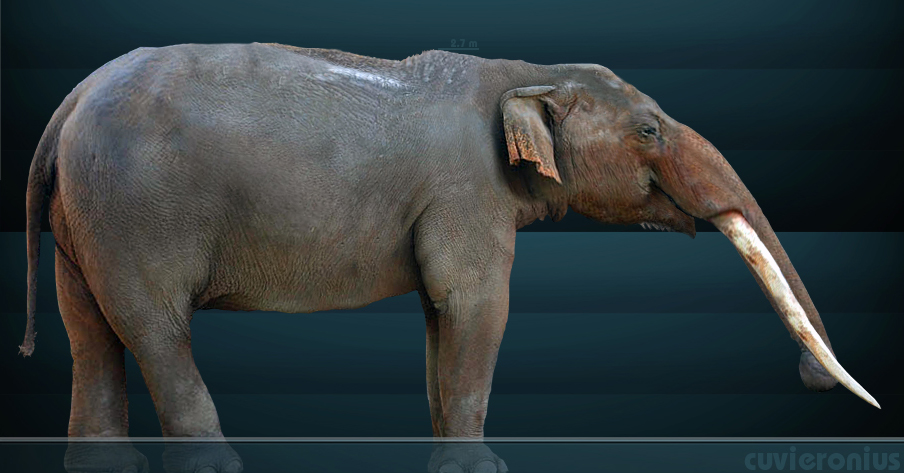
- Life restoration of the Pliocene-Holocene elephant relative Cuvieronius
  †Cuvieronius
- Cyclocardia
- Cygnus
  - †Cygnus columbianus – or unidentified related form
- Cylichna
- †Cylindracanthus
- Cymatium
- †Cymatosira
- Cymatosyrinx
- Cynoscion
  - †Cynoscion nebulosus – or unidentified comparable form
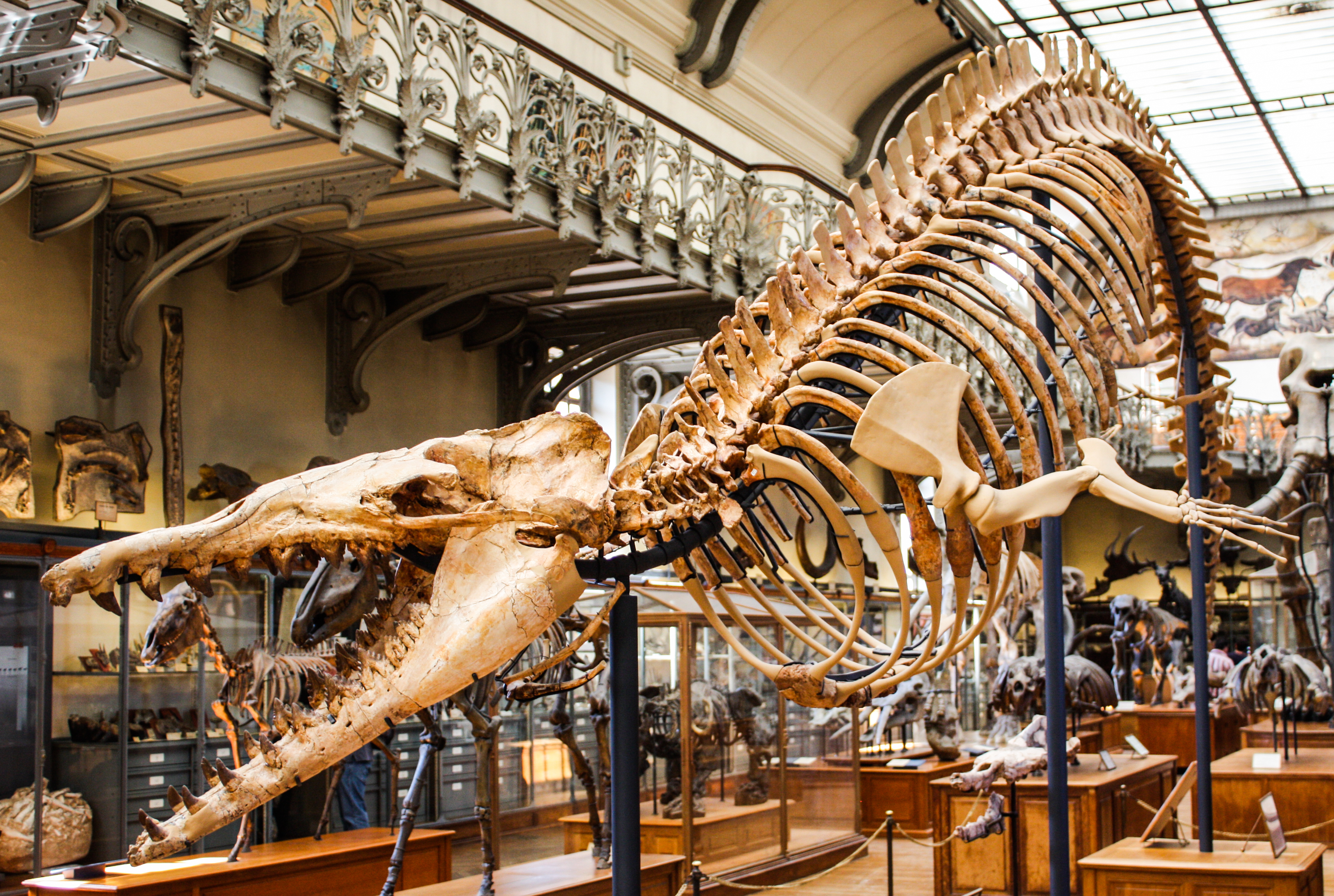
- Mounted fossilized skeleton of the Eocene whale Cynthiacetus
  †Cynthiacetus
- Cypraea
- Dasyatis
  - †Dasyatis americana – or unidentified comparable form
  - †Dasyatis centroura
  - †Dasyatis say
- †Deinosuchus
  - †Deinosuchus rugosus
- Delphinapterus
- Delphinus
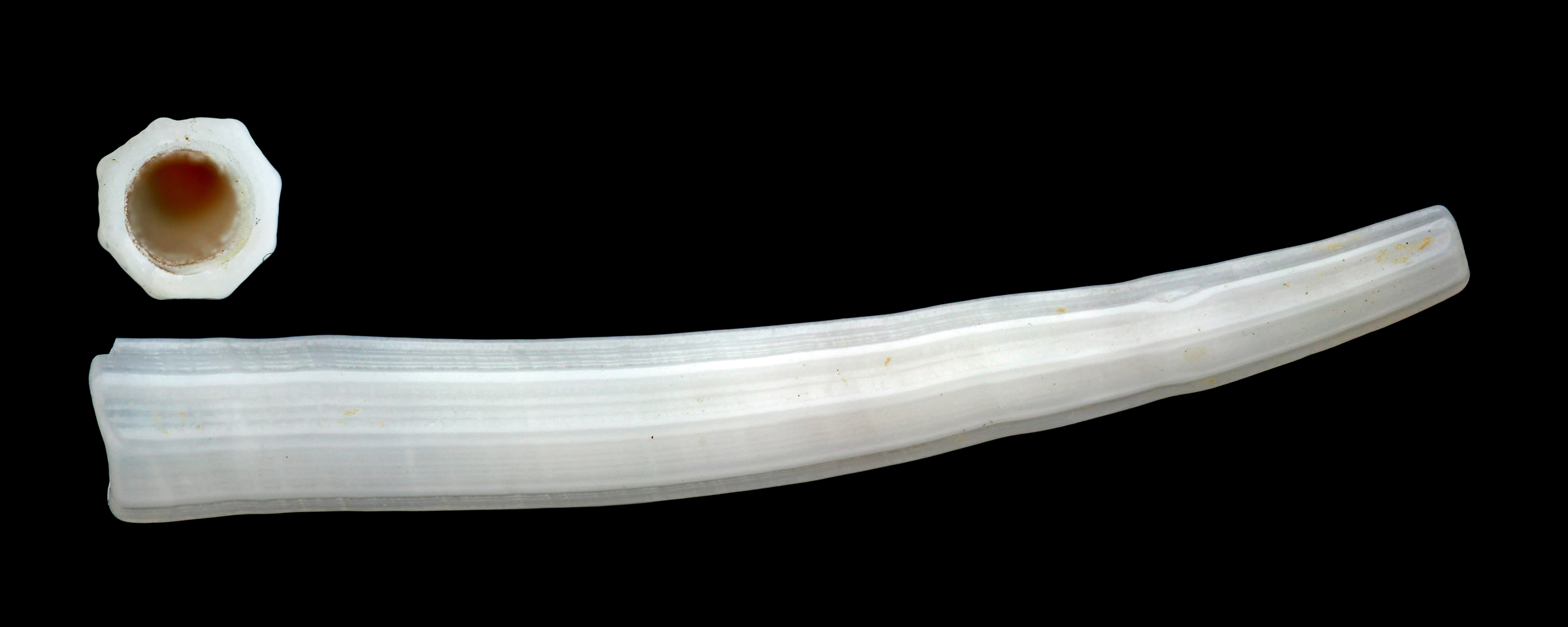
- Shell of a Dentalium tusk shell
  Dentalium
- †Denticula
- Dentimargo
- Dermomurex
- †Dictyocha
- †Didianema
- Dinocardium
  - †Dinocardium robustum
- Diodora
  - †Diplodonta punctata
- †Distephanus
- Distorsio
- Donax
  - †Donax fossor
  - †Donax variabilis
- Dosinia
  - †Dosinia discus
- Echinocardium
- Echinorhinus
- †Ecphora
- †Ectopistes
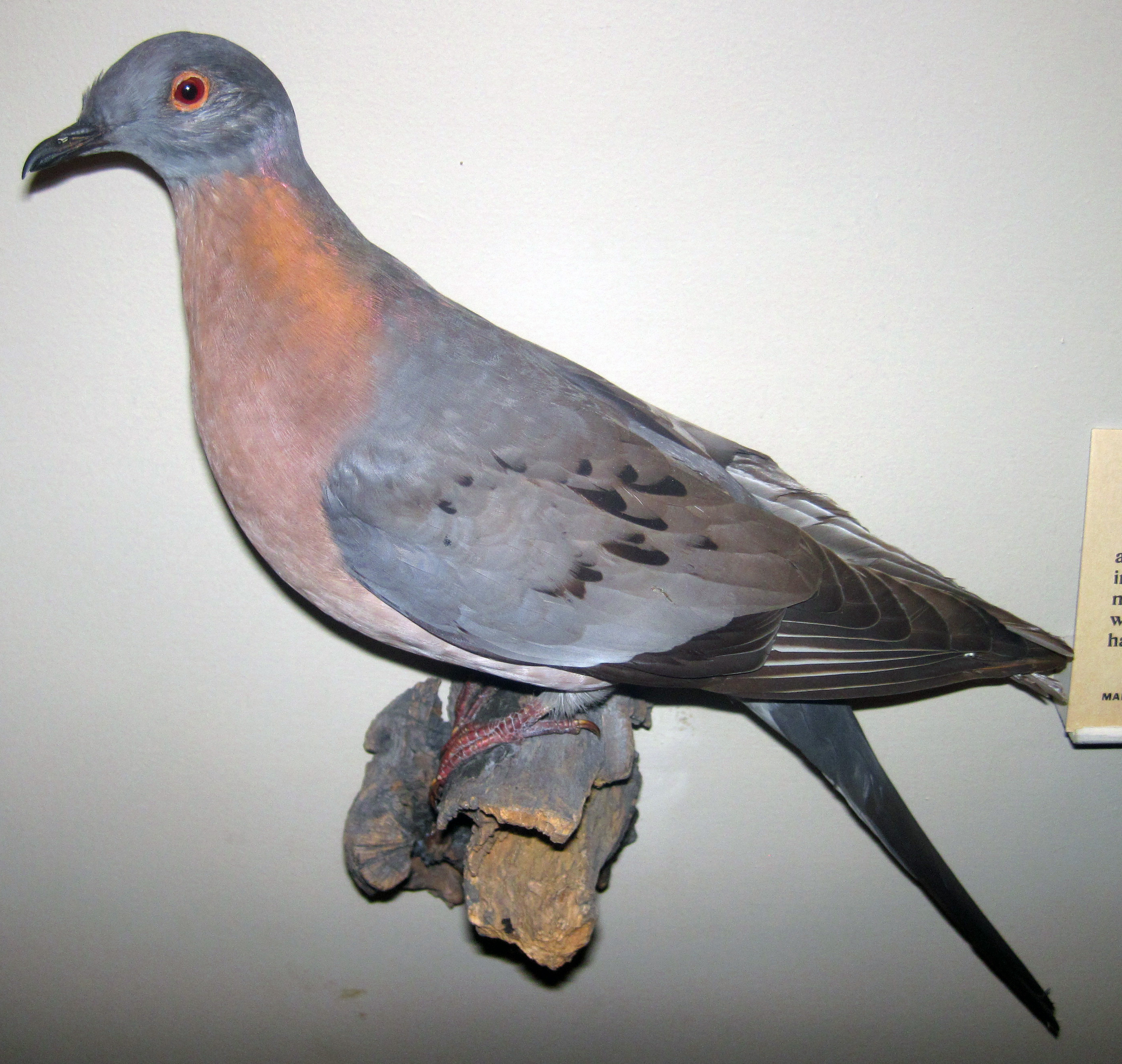
  - Taxidermied male Ectopistes migratorius, or passenger pigeon
    †Ectopistes migratorius – or unidentified related form
- Electra
- Elphidium
- Emarginula
- Ensis
  - †Ensis directus
- Epinephelus
- Epitonium
  - †Epitonium humphreysii
- Equetus
- Ervilia
- Erycina
- Eudocimus
- Eulima
- Eupleura
  - †Eupleura caudata
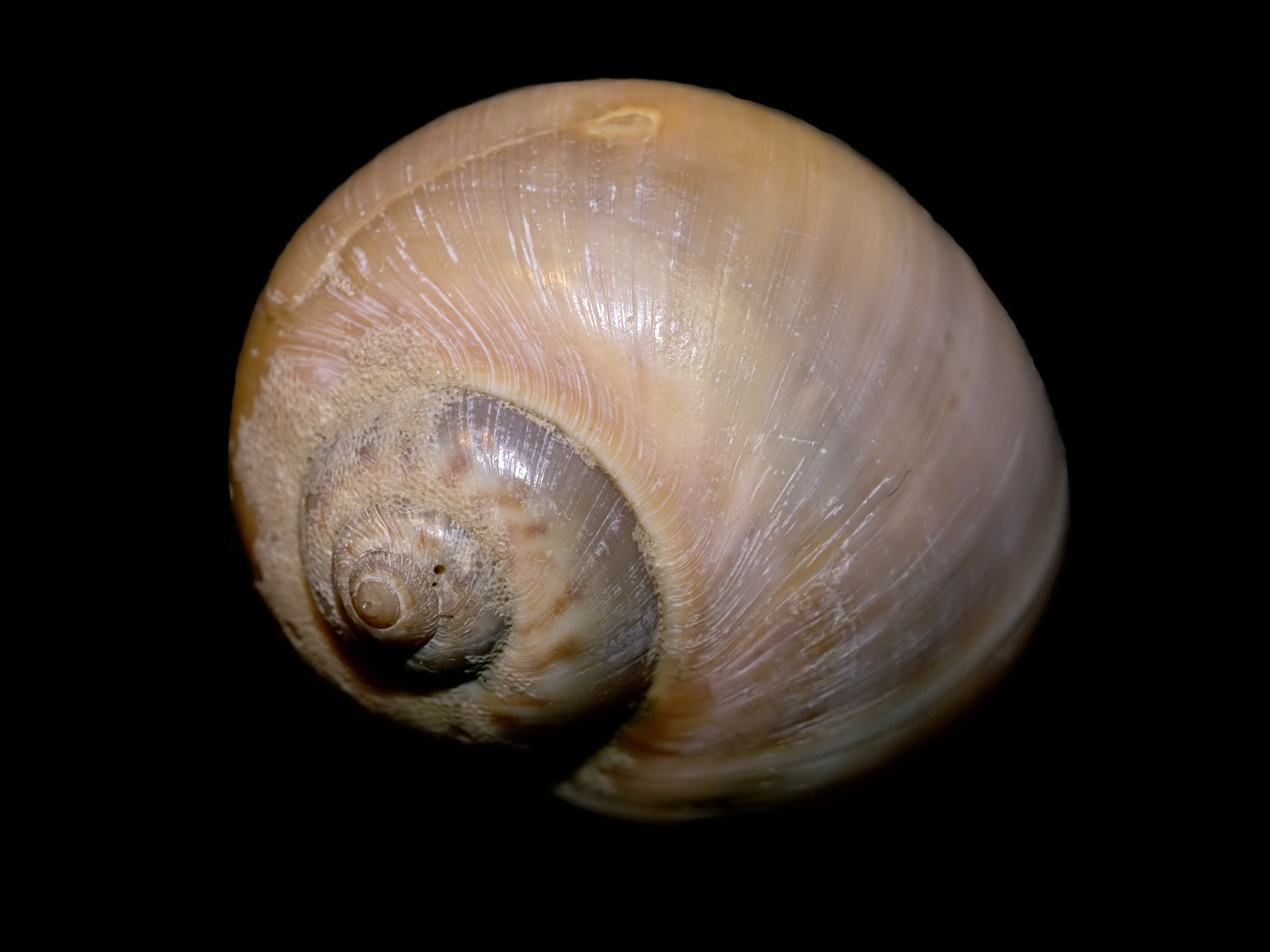
- Shell of a Euspira moon sea snail
  Euspira
  - †Euspira heros
- †Eutrephoceras
- Euvola
  - †Euvola raveneli
- Fabella
- Fasciolaria
  - †Fasciolaria tulipa
- Fenimorea
- †Ficopsis
- Ficus
  - †Ficus communis
- Flabellum
- Fratercula
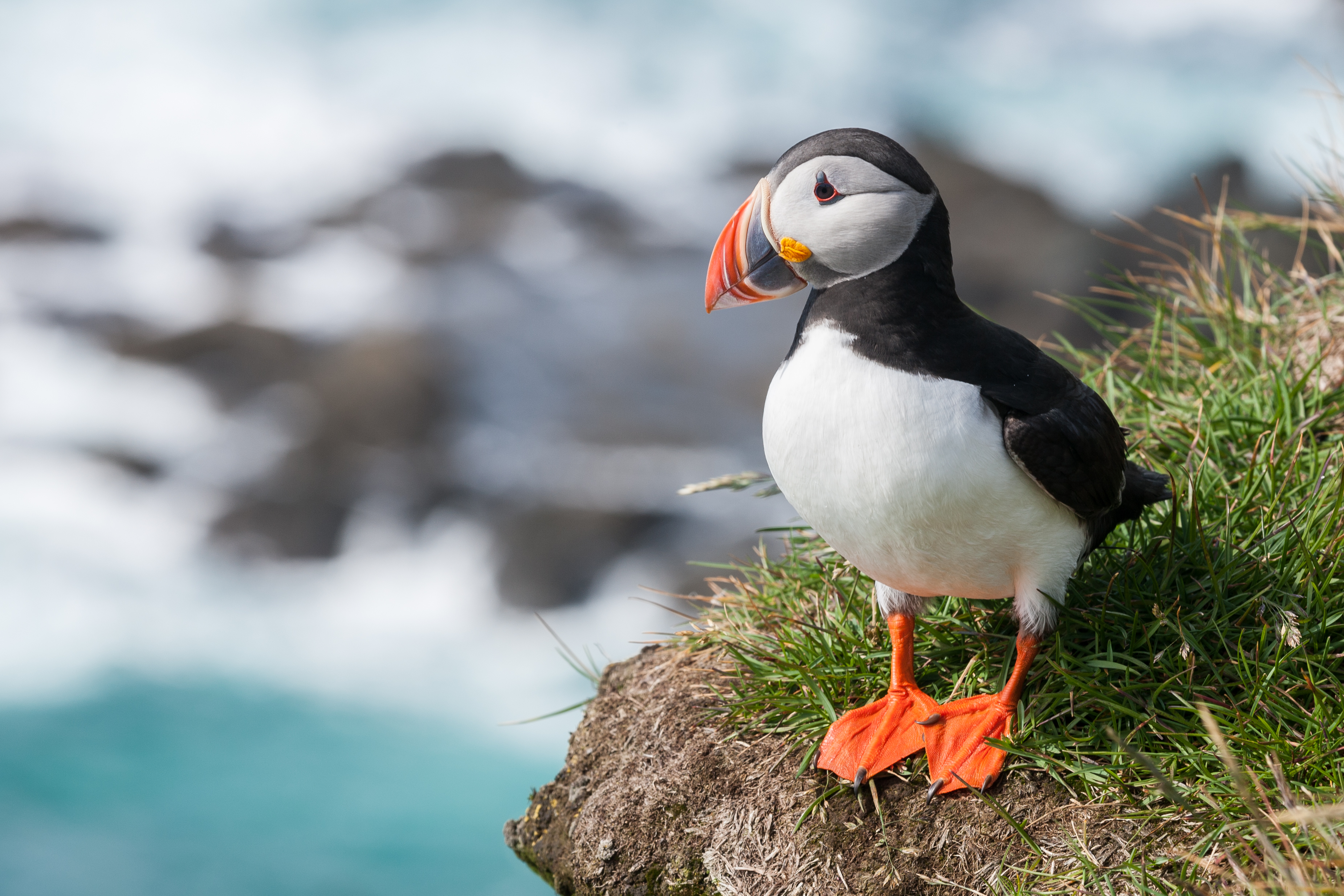
  - A living Fratercula arctica, or Atlantic puffin
    †Fratercula arctica – or unidentified related form
  - †Fratercula cirrhata – or unidentified related form
- †Fraxinus
- Fulgurofusus
- Fusinus
- Gadus
  - †Gadus morhua – or unidentified comparable form
- Galeocerdo
  - †Galeocerdo contortus
  - †Galeocerdo cuvier – or unidentified comparable form
- Galeodea
- Galeorhinus
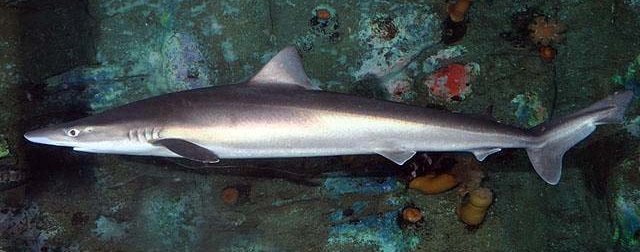
  - A living Galeorhinus galeus school shark
    †Galeorhinus galeus
- Gari
- Gastrochaena
- Gavia
- Gemma
  - †Gemma gemma
- Geochelone
- Geodia
- †Gigantostrea
- Ginglymostoma
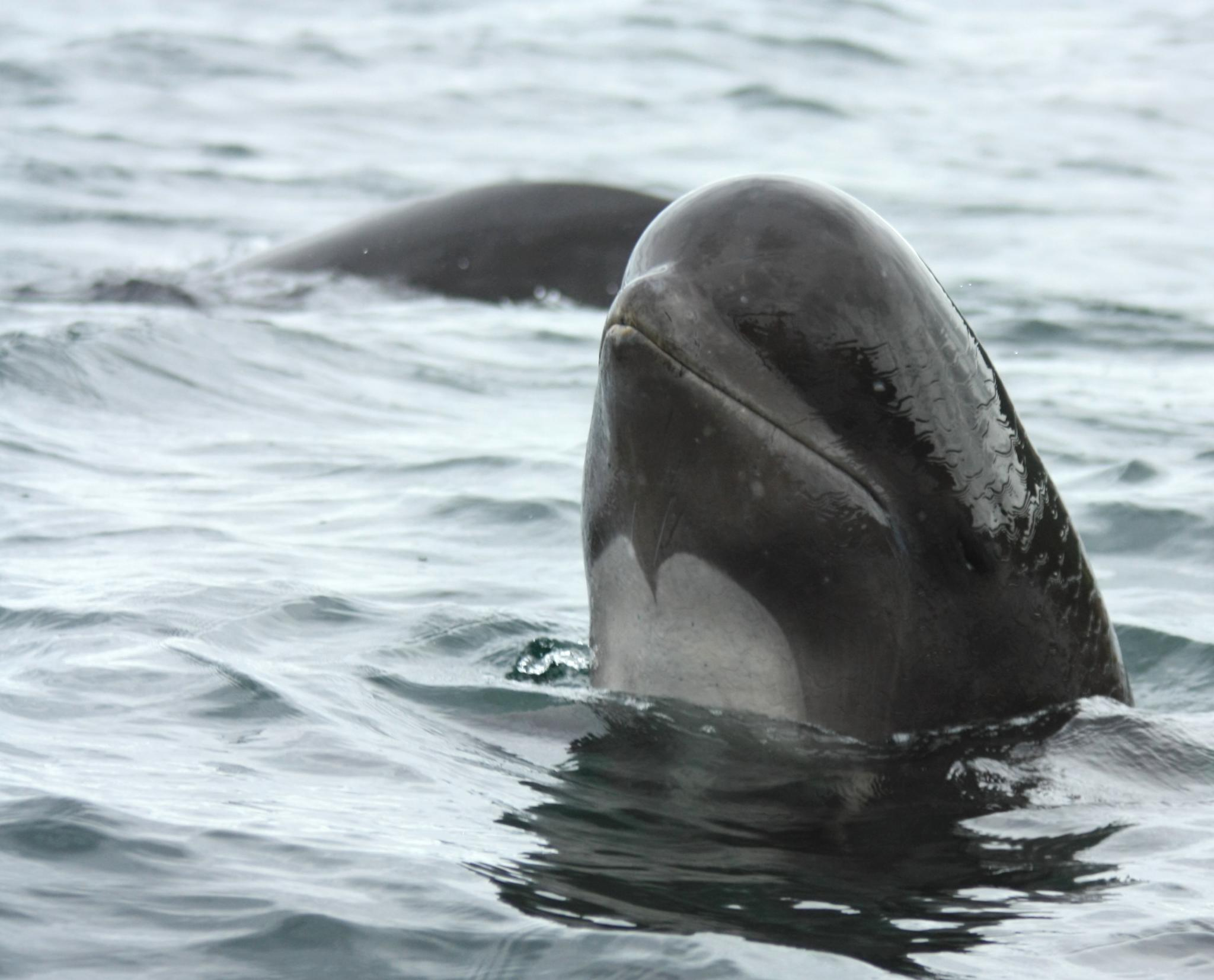
- A living Globicephala, or pilot whale
  Globicephala
- Globigerina
  - †Globigerina bulloides
- Globigerinoides
  - †Globorotalia menardii
- Glossus
- Glycymeris
  - †Glycymeris americana
- Glyphostoma
- Glyphoturris
  - †Glyphoturris eritima
- Glyptoactis
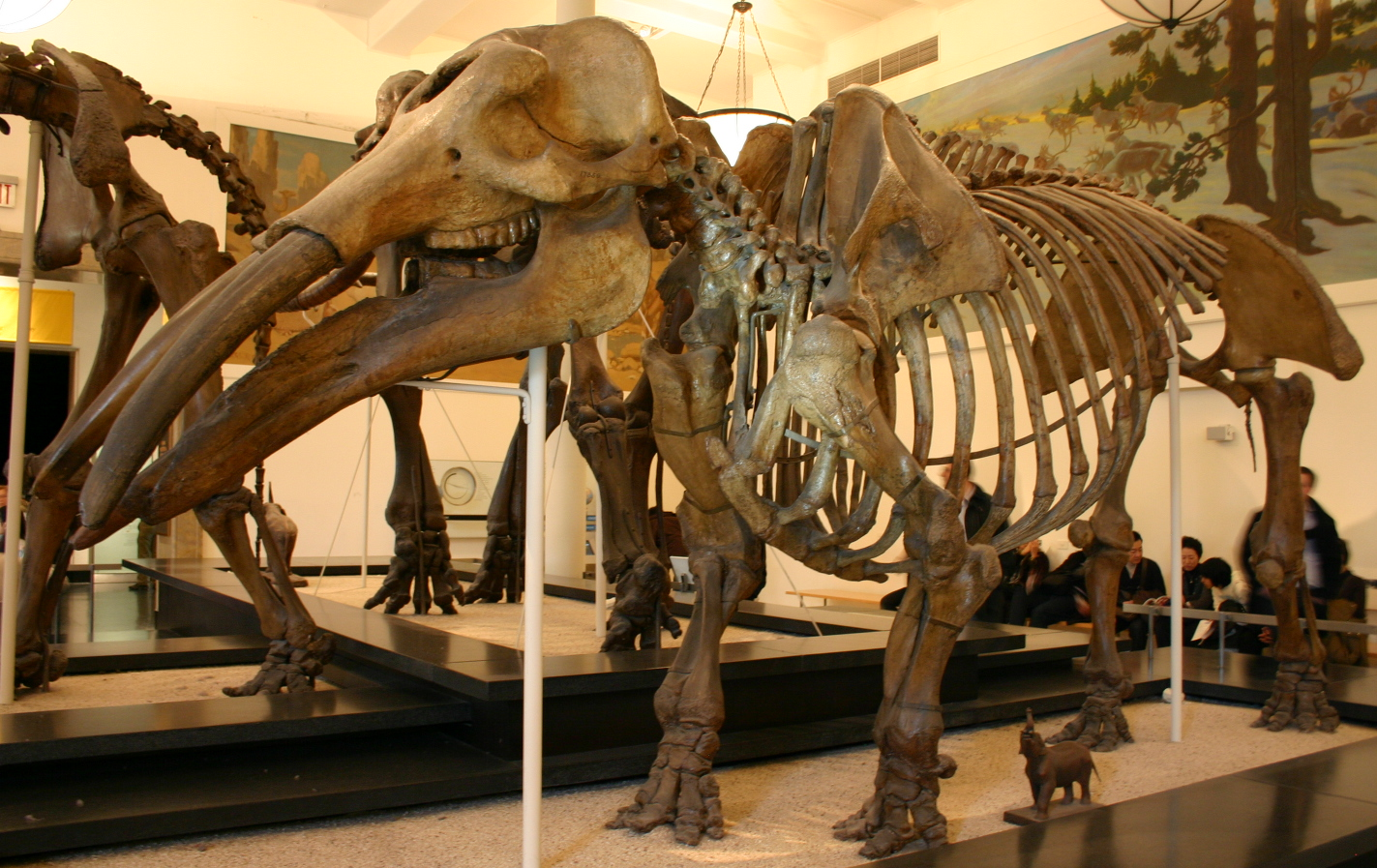
- Mounted fossilized skeleton of the Miocene-Pleistocene elephant relative Gomphotherium
  †Gomphotherium
- Granulina
- Grus
  - †Grus americana – or unidentified related form
  - †Grus antigone – or unidentified related form
- †Gryphoca
- †Hadrosaurus
- Haematopus
  - †Haematopus ostralegus – or unidentified related form
  - †Haematopus palliatus – or unidentified related form
- Haustator – tentative report
- Heilprinia
- †Heliornis
  - †Heliornis fulica – or unidentified related form
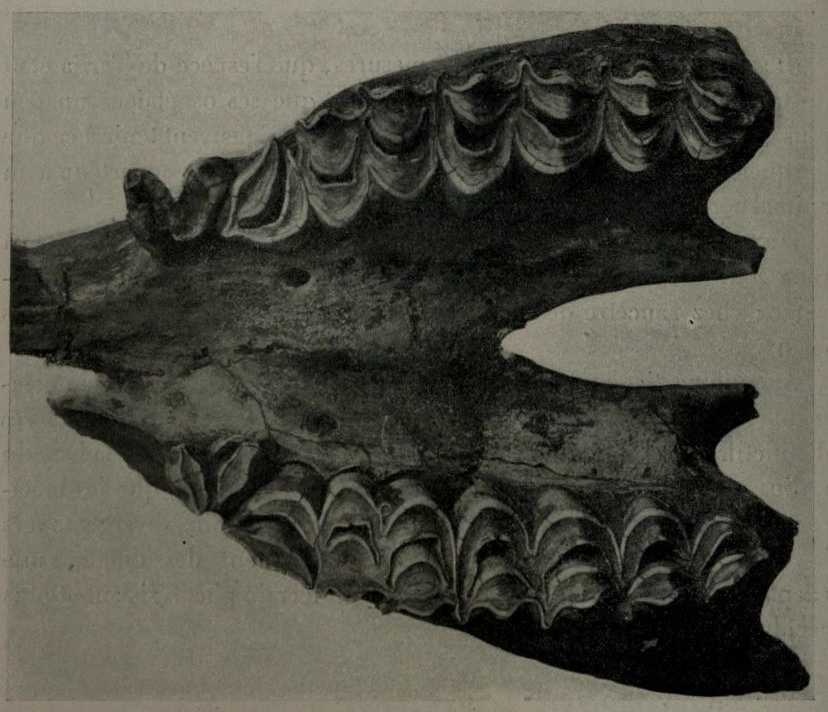
- Fossilized lower jaw of the Miocene-Pleistocene llama relative Hemiauchenia
  †Hemiauchenia – or unidentified comparable form
- Hemipristis
  - †Hemipristis serra
- †Hemirhabdorhynchus
- †Herpetocetus
- Heterodontus
- Hexanchus
- Hiatella
  - †Hiatella arctica
- Histrionicus
  - †Histrionicus histrionicus – or unidentified related form
- †Homiphoca
- Hyalina
- †Hyalodiscus
- Hydroides – tentative report
- †Hypogaleus
- Ilyanassa
  - †Ilyanassa obsoleta
  - †Ilyanassa trivittata
- Ischadium
  - †Ischadium recurvum
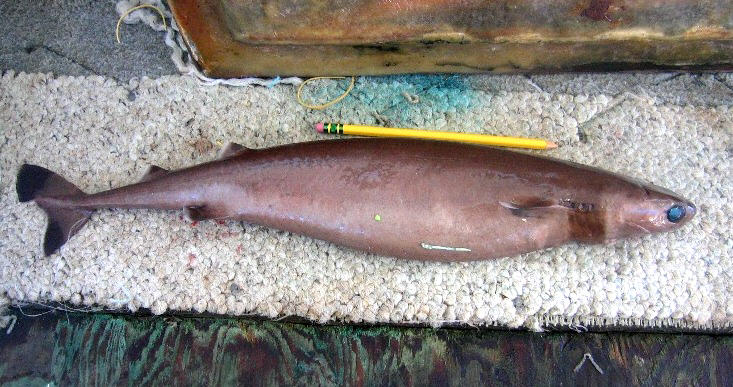
- A modern Isistius dogfish
  Isistius
- Isoetes
- Isognomon
- Istiophorus
  - †Istiophorus platypterus
- Isurus
  - †Isurus oxyrinchus
- Ithycythara
  - †Ithycythara psila
- Juniperus
  - †Juniperus virginiana – or unidentified comparable form
- †Kellum
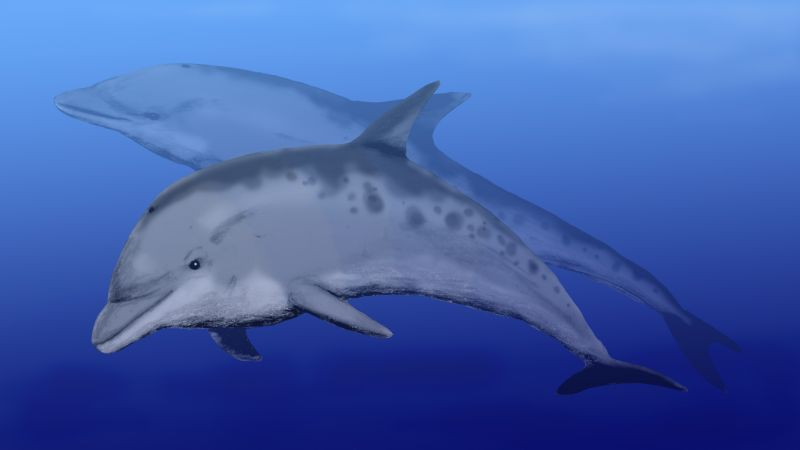
- Life restoration of the Oligocene-Miocene dolphin Kentriodon
  †Kentriodon
- Kogia – or unidentified comparable form
  - †Kogia breviceps
- †Kogiopsis – or unidentified comparable form
  - †Kogiopsis floridana
- Kuphus
- Kurtziella
  - †Kurtziella cerina
- †Kyptoceras
- Laevicardium
  - †Laevicardium mortoni
- Lagena
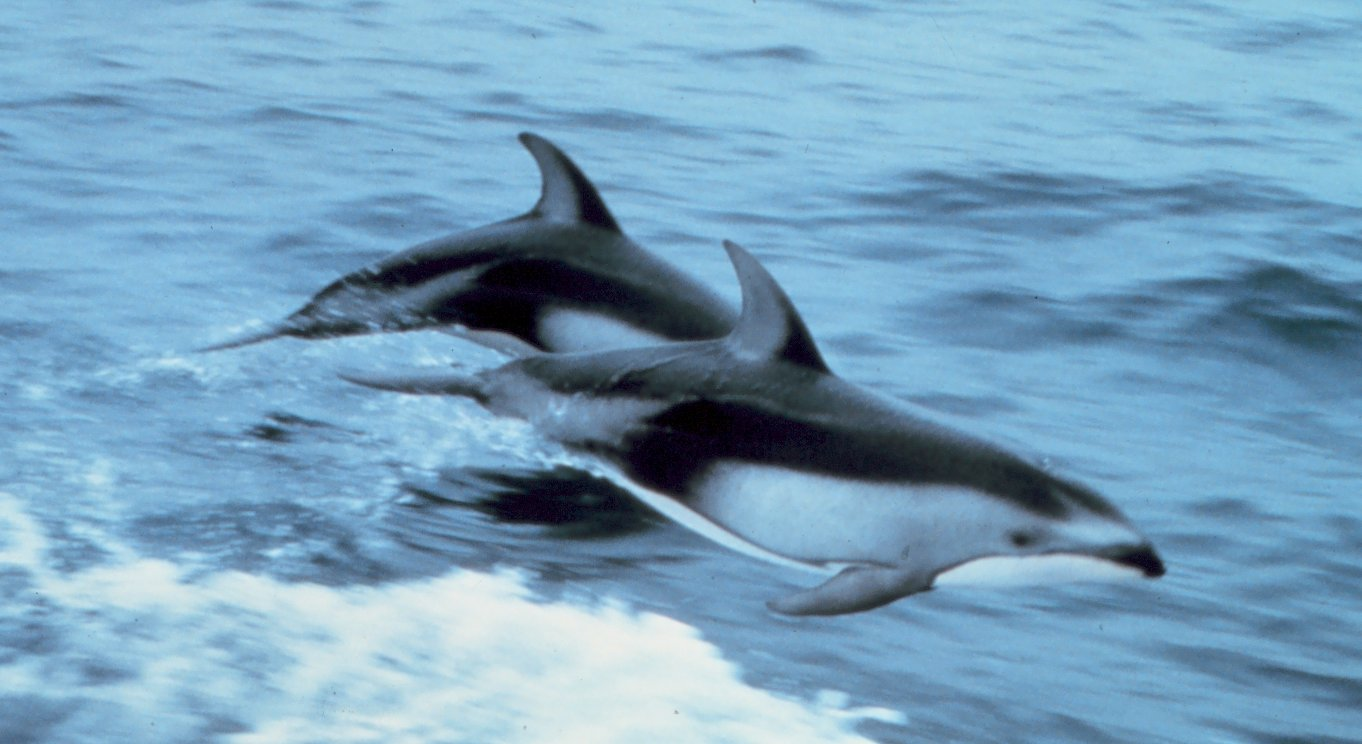
- Living Lagenorhynchus dolphins
  Lagenorhynchus
- †Lagodon
  - †Lagodon rhomboides – or unidentified comparable form
- Lamna
- Larus
  - †Larus argentatus – or unidentified related form
  - †Larus atricilla – or unidentified related form
  - †Larus delawarensis – or unidentified related form
  - †Larus minutus – or unidentified related form
- Leiostomus
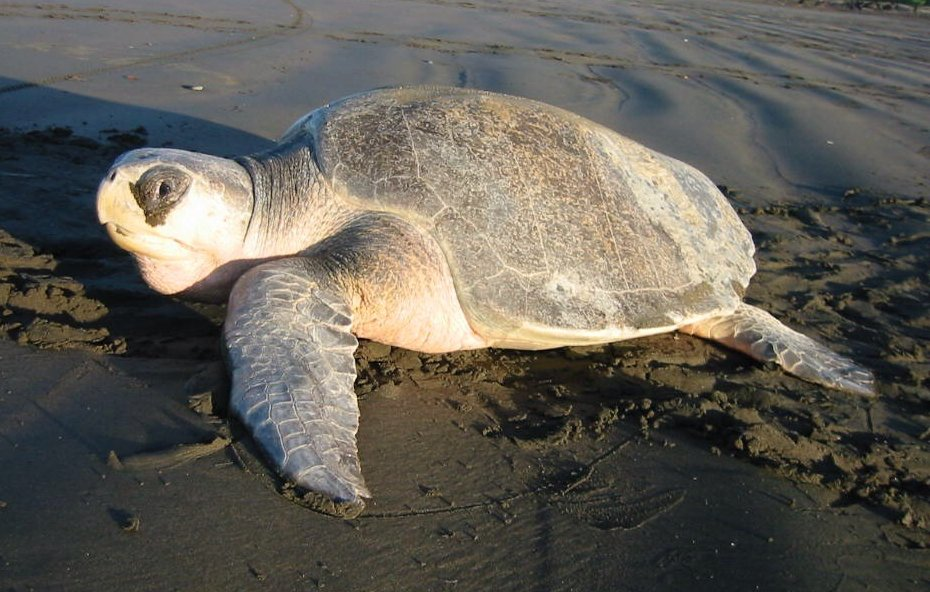
- A living Lepidochelys, or ridley sea turtle
  Lepidochelys
- Limaria
- Linga
- †Linthia
- Liquidambar
- Littoraria
  - †Littoraria irrorata
- Littorina
- †Lonicera
- Lophius
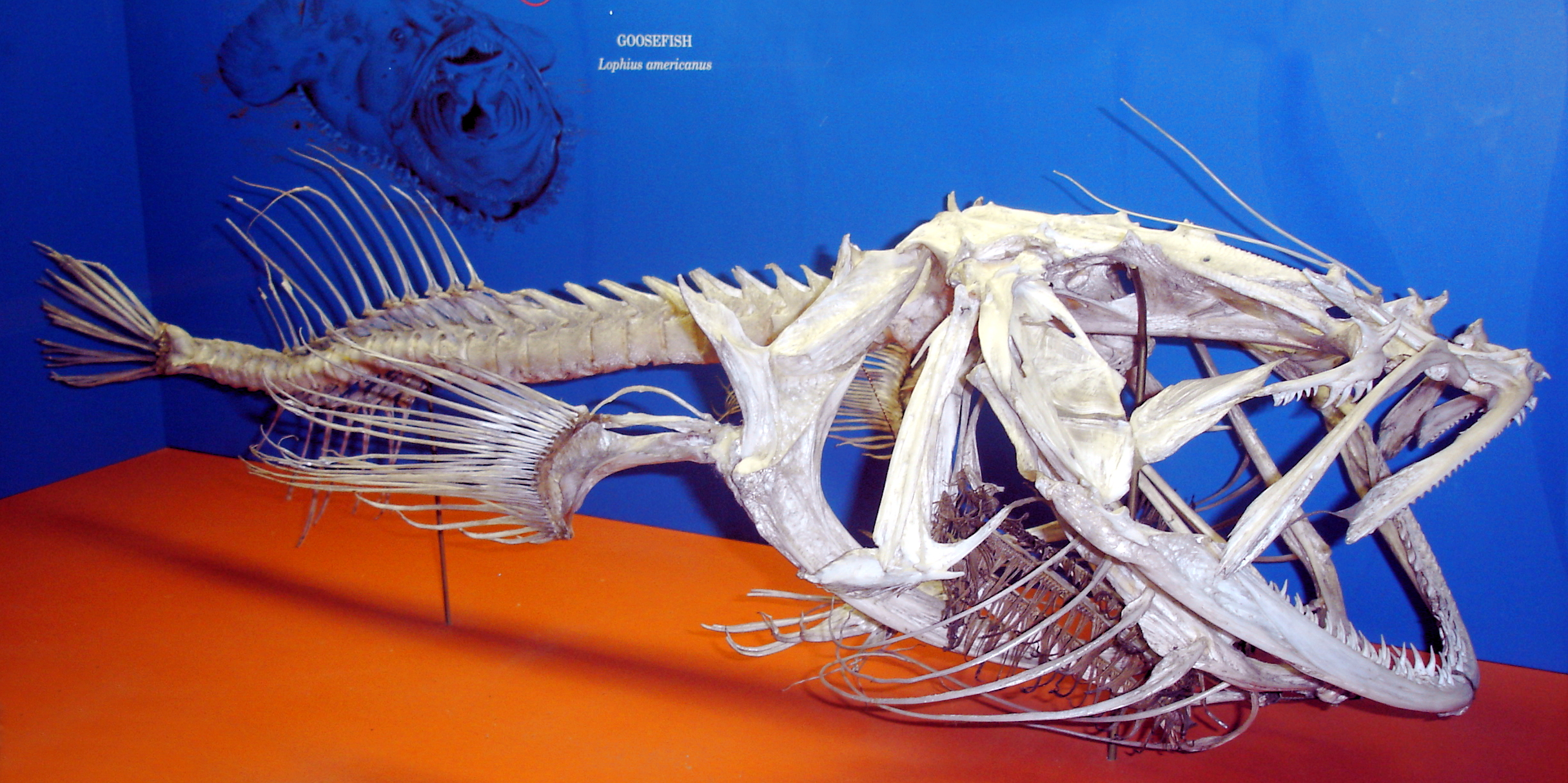
  - Mounted skeleton of a Lophius americanus, or American anglerfish
    †Lophius americanus – or unidentified comparable form
- †Lophocetus – or unidentified related form
- Lopholatilus
  - †Lopholatilus chamaeleonticeps
- Lucina
  - †Lucina pensylvanica
- Lyria
- Macoma
- Macrocallista
  - †Macrocallista nimbosa
- †Macromphalina
  - †Macromphalina pierrot
- Makaira
  - †Makaira indica
  - †Makaira nigricans
- †Mammut
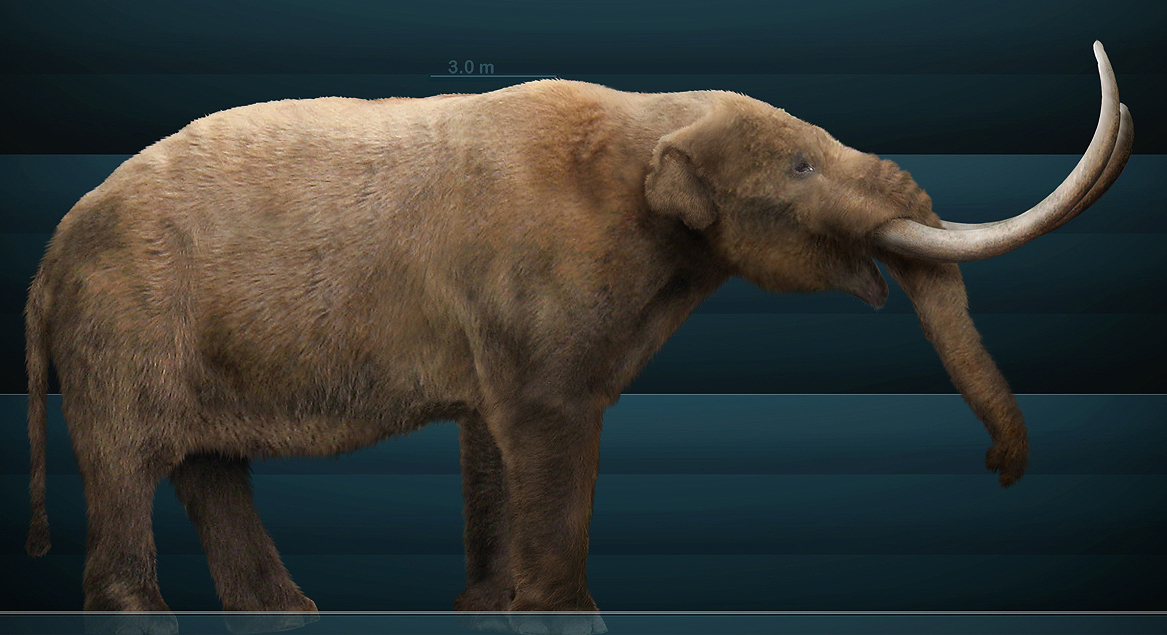
  - Restoration of a Mammut americanum, or American mastodon
    †Mammut americanum
- Manta
- Maretia
- Marginella
- Megachasma
- Megalops
  - †Megalops atlanticus – or unidentified comparable form
- Megaptera
- †Meherrinia – type locality for genus
  - †Meherrinia isoni – type locality for species
- Meiocardia
- Melanella
  - †Melanella conoidea
- Melanitta
  - †Melanitta nigra – or unidentified related form
  - †Melanitta perspicillata – or unidentified related form
- Melanogrammus
  - †Melanogrammus aeglefinus – or unidentified comparable form
- Meleagris
- Menippe – tentative report
- Mercenaria
  - †Mercenaria mercenaria
- Meretrix
- Mergus
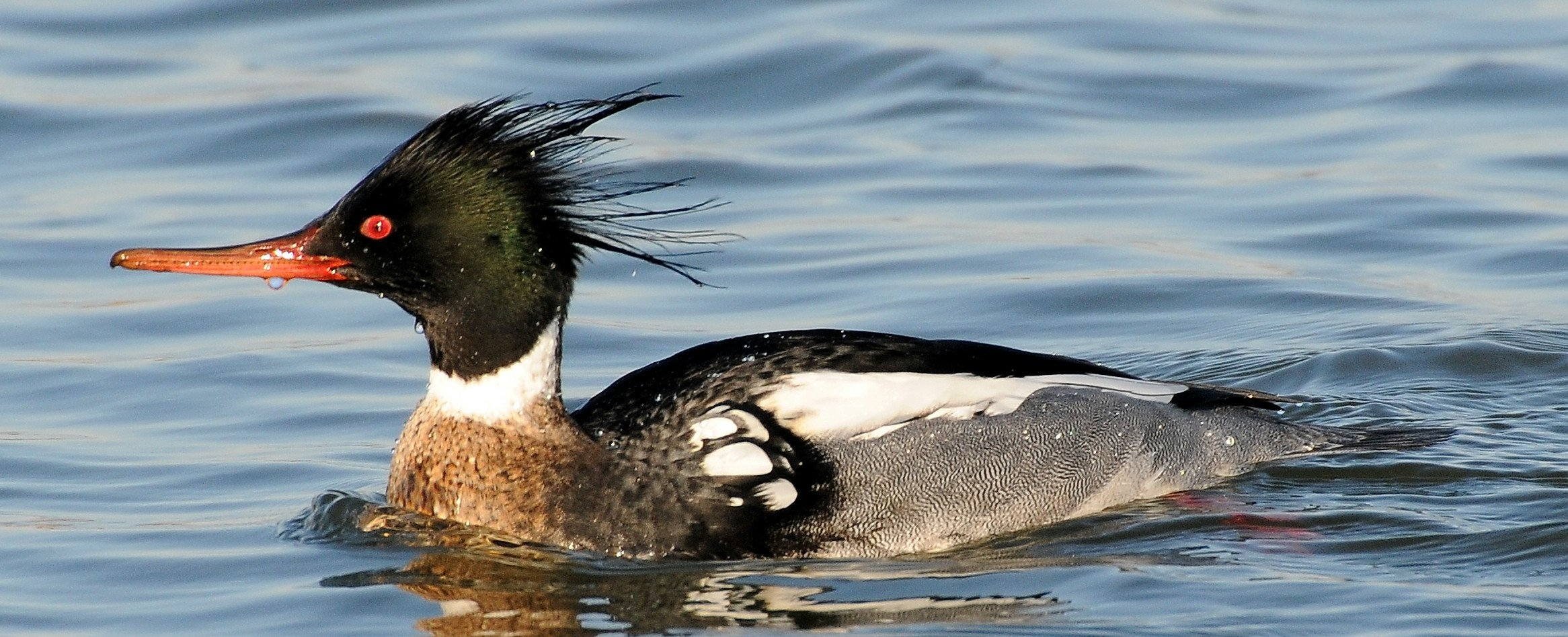
  - A living Mergus serrator, or red-breasted merganser
    †Mergus serrator – or unidentified related form
- Merluccius
  - †Merluccius albidus
  - †Merluccius bilinearis – or unidentified comparable form
- Mesoplodon
- Metulella
- Microgadus
  - †Microgadus tomcod – or unidentified comparable form
- Micropogonias
- Mitra
- Mitrella
- Mobula
- Modiolus
  - †Modiolus modiolus
- Mola
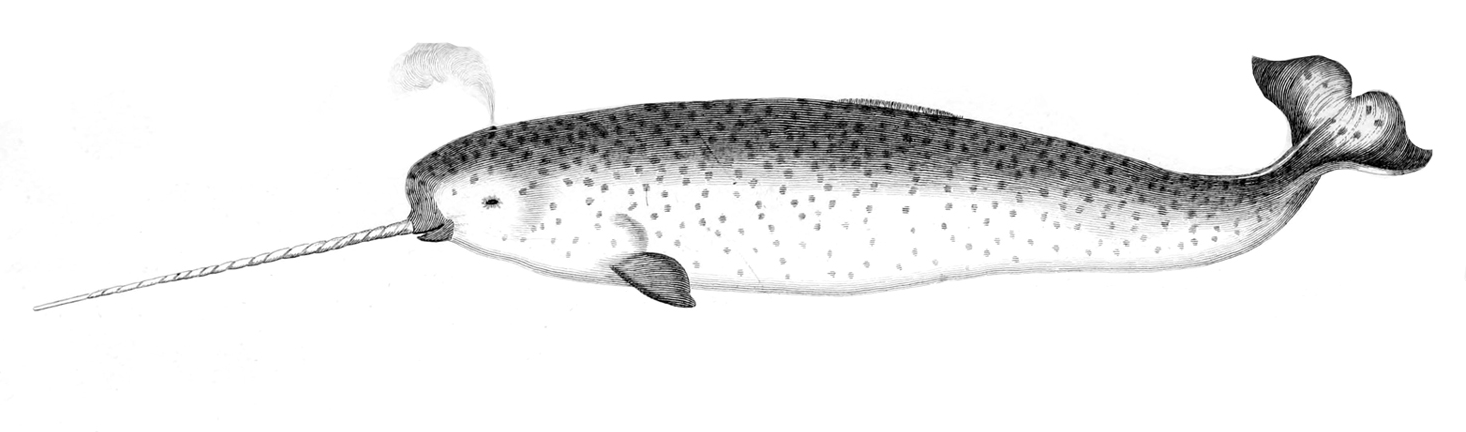
- A living Monodon monoceros, or narwhal
  Monodon – or unidentified comparable form
- Morus
- Muellerina
- Mulinia
  - †Mulinia lateralis
- Musculus
  - †Musculus lateralis
- Mustelus
- †Mya
  - †Mya arenaria
- Mycteroperca
- Myliobatis
- Myriophyllum
- Mytilus
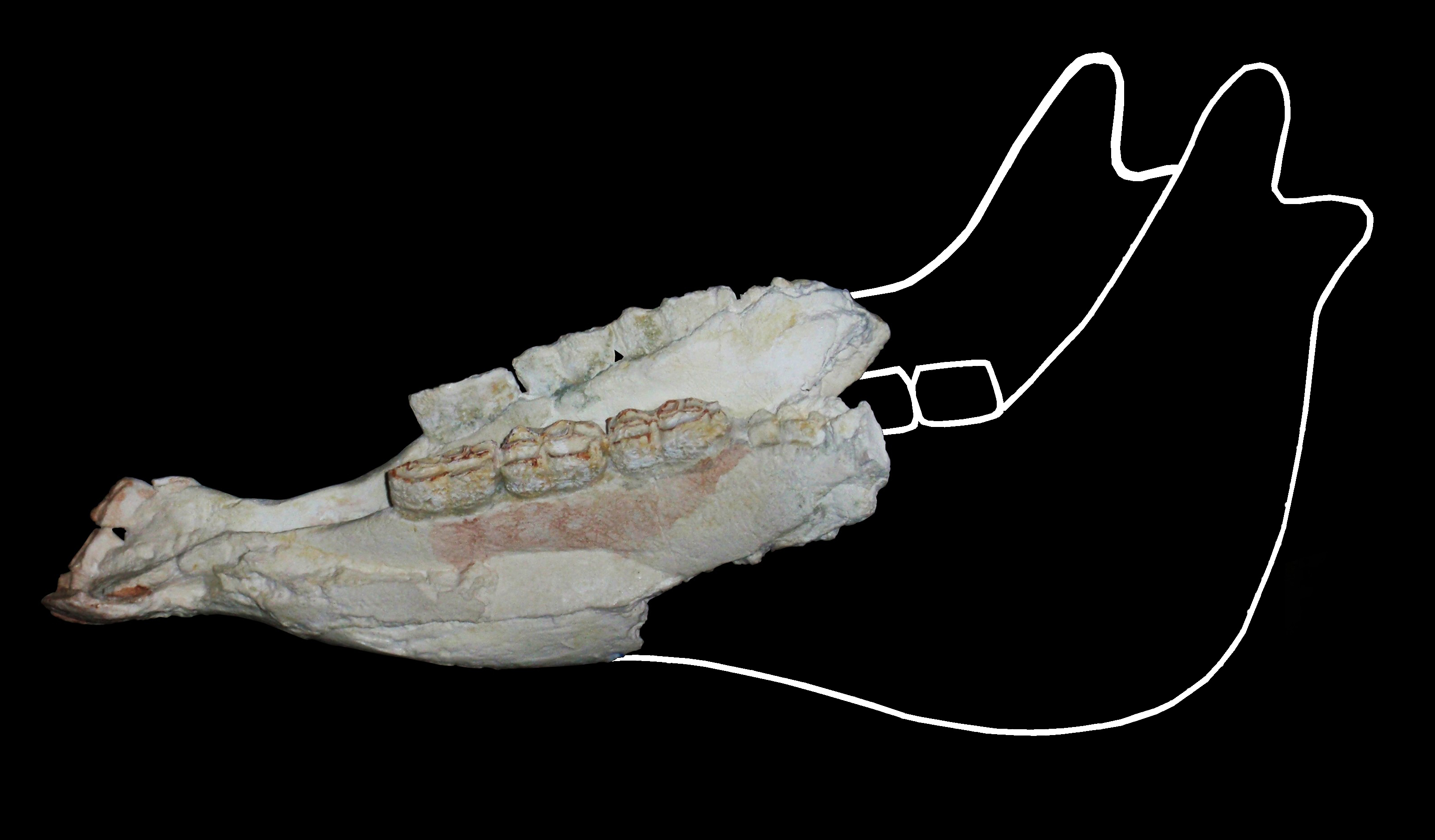
- Partial fossilized mandible of the Miocene-Pliocene horse Nannippus
  †Nannippus
- †Nanosiren – tentative report
- Nassarius
  - †Nassarius acutus
  - †Nassarius antillarum
  - †Nassarius vibex
- Naticarius
- †Navicula
- Negaprion
  - †Negaprion brevirostris
- †Neohipparion
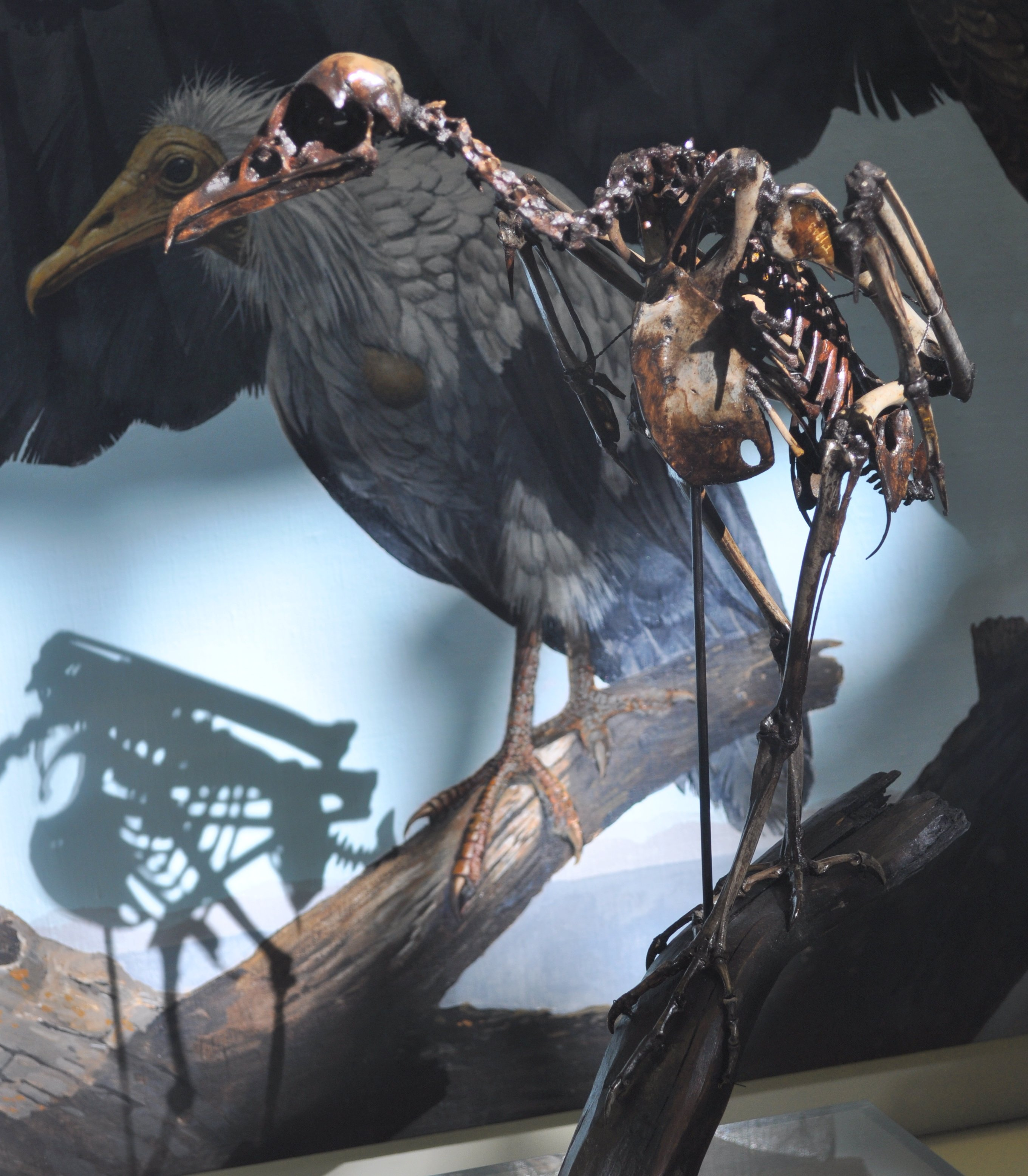
- Mounted fossilized skeleton of the Miocene Neophrontops
  Neophrontops – tentative report
- Neverita
- Niso
- †Nitzschia
- Niveria
  - †Niveria suffusa
- Notorynchus
- Nucula
  - †Nucula proxima
  - †Nuculana acuta
- Numenius
  - †Numenius borealis – or unidentified related form
- †Nuphar
- Nymphaea
- †Nyssa
- Odontaspis
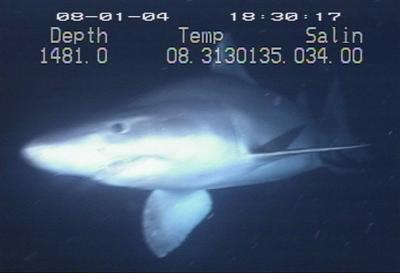
  - A living Odontaspis ferox, or smalltooth sand tiger
    †Odontaspis ferox
- Odostomia
  - †Odostomia acutidens
- Oliva
  - †Oliva sayana
- Olivella
  - †Olivella minuta
  - †Olivella mutica
- Onoba
- †Ontocetus – type locality for genus
  - †Ontocetus emmonsi – type locality for species
- Oocorys
- Ophidion
- †Opsanus
  - †Opsanus tau
- Ortalis – tentative report
- †Orycterocetus
- †Osmunda
  - †Osmunda regalis
- Ostrea
  - †Ostrea compressirostra
- Ostrya
- †Otodus
  - Diagram illustrating the largest (grey) and most conservative (red) size estimates of the Miocene-Pliocene shark Carcharocles megalodon (sometimes Carcharodon or Otodus megalodon) with a whale shark (violet), great white shark (green), and anachronistic human (black) to scale
    †Otodus megalodon
- Pachyptila
- Pagrus
- Pandion
- Pandora
- Panopea
- Paragaleus
- †Paralia
- Paralichthys
- †Parotodus
  - †Parotodus benedenii
- Parvanachis
  - †Parvanachis obesa
- Pecten
- †Pediastrum
- †Pediomeryx
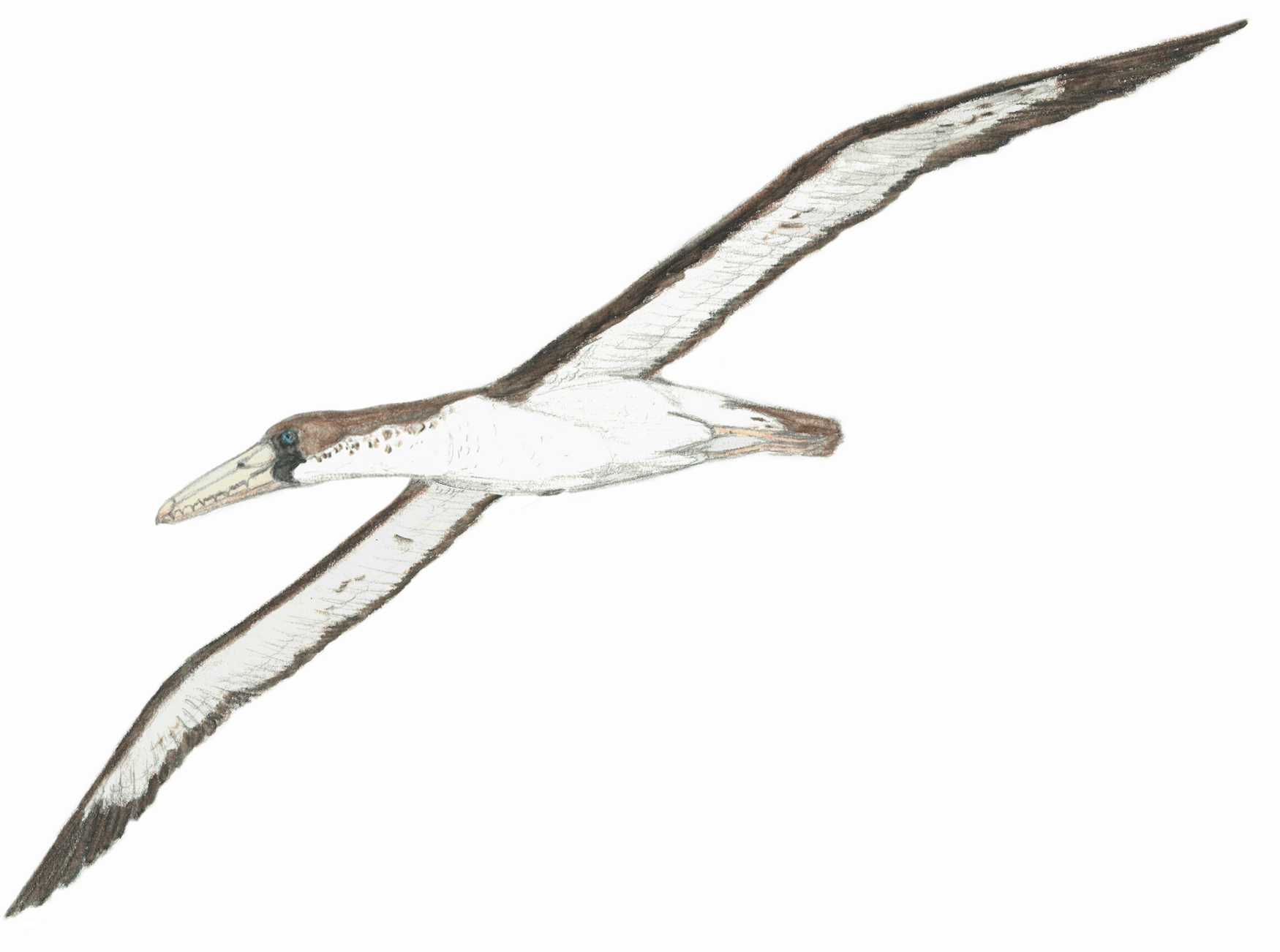
- Life restoration of the Oligocene-Pleistocene false-toothed bird Pelagornis
  †Pelagornis
- Pelecanus
  - †Pelecanus schreiberi – type locality for species
- Perotrochus
- Petaloconchus
- Petricola
  - †Petricola pholadiformis
- Phalacrocorax
- Phalium
- †Phocageneus – or unidentified related form
- †Phocanella
- †Phoebastria
  - †Phoebastria albatrus – or unidentified related form
  - †Phoebastria immutabilis – or unidentified related form
  - †Phoebastria nigripes – or unidentified related form
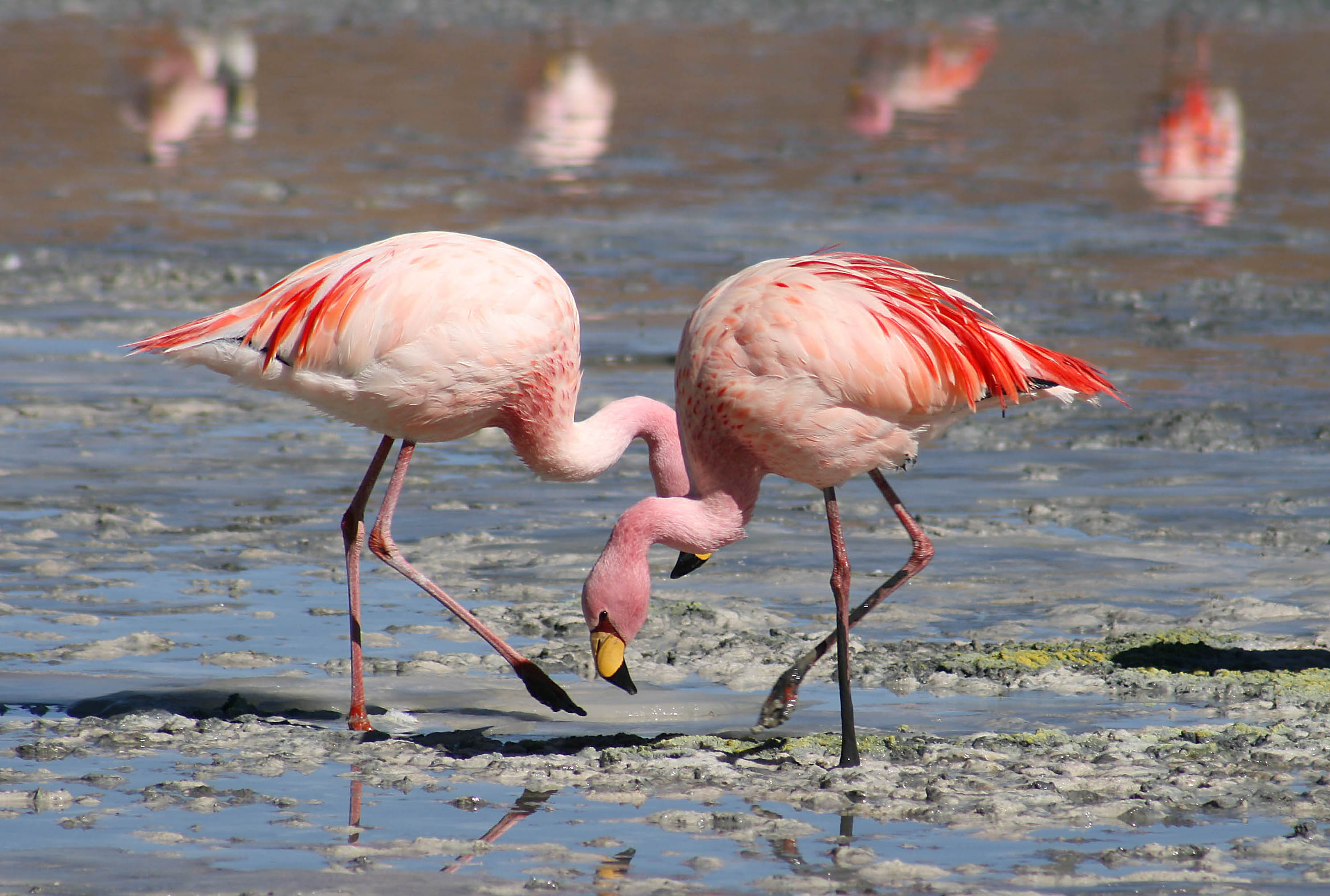
- Two Phoenicopterus, or flamingos
  Phoenicopterus
- Pholadomya
- Phyllonotus
  - †Phyllonotus pomum
- Physeter – or unidentified comparable form
  - †Physeter macrocephalus
- †Physeterula – or unidentified comparable form
- Picea
- †Pinguinus
  - †Pinguinus alfrednewtoni – type locality for species
- Pinna – tentative report
- Pinus
  - †Pinus palustris – or unidentified comparable form
- Pisania
- Pitar
  - †Pitar morrhuanus
- Placopecten
  - †Placopecten magellanicus – or unidentified related form
- †Platyphoca
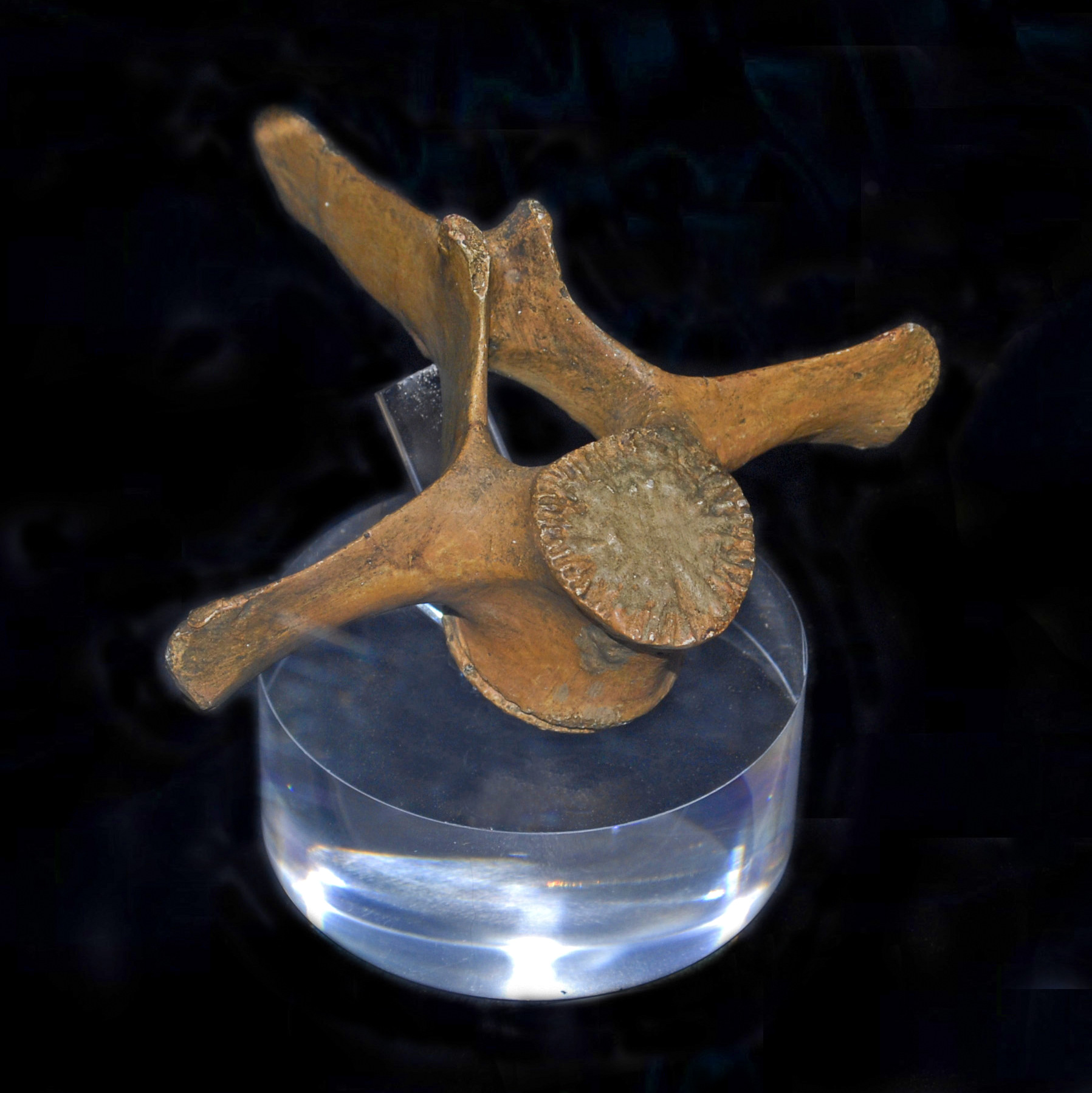
- Fossilized vertebra of the Miocene-Pleistocene baleen whale Plesiocetus
  †Plesiocetus – or unidentified comparable form
- Pleurofusia
- Pleuromeris
  - †Pleuromeris tridentata
- Pleurotomaria
- Plicatula
  - †Plicatula gibbosa
- Pluvialis
  - †Pluvialis squatarola – or unidentified related form
- Podiceps
  - †Podiceps auritus
- Pogonias
  - †Pogonias cromis – or unidentified comparable form
- Polinices
- Polydora
- Polygireulima
- Polygonum
- Polymesoda
  - †Polymesoda caroliniana
- Pomatomus
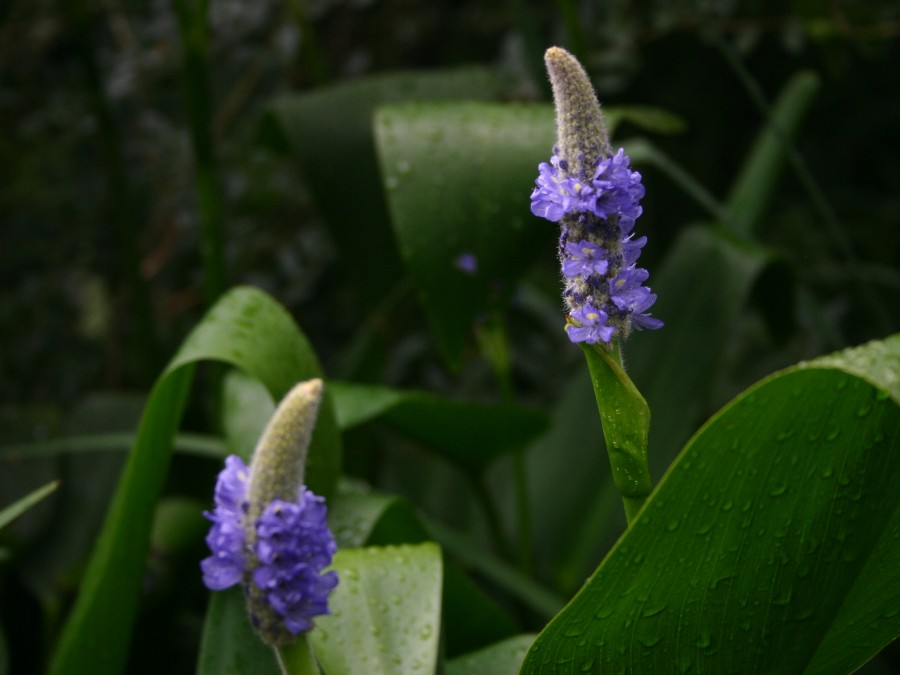
- Living Pontederia pickerel weeds
  †Pontederia
- Pontoporia – or unidentified comparable form
- Populus
- †Potamogeton
- Prionotus
  - †Prionotus evolans – or unidentified comparable form
- Pristiophorus
- Pristis
- Procellaria
  - †Procellaria aequinoctialis – or unidentified comparable form
  - †Procellaria parkinsoni – or unidentified comparable form
- †Procolpochelys
- †Protosiren
- Prunum
  - †Prunum bellum
  - †Prunum roscidum
- Psammechinus
- †Psephophorus
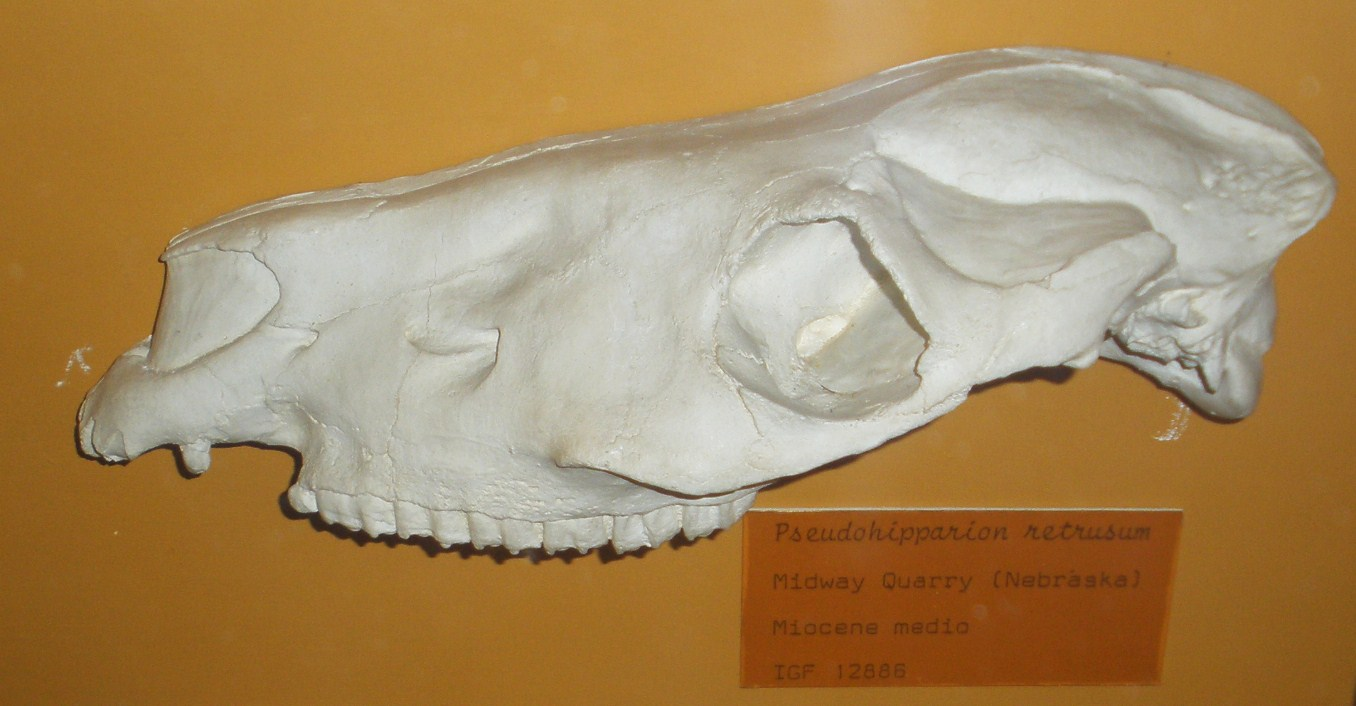
- Replica of a fossilized cranium of the Miocene horse Pseudhipparion
  †Pseudhipparion
- Pseudochama
- Pseudorca
- Pseudotorinia
- Pteria
- Pterodroma
  - †Pterodroma lessonii
- †Pterodromoides
  - †Pterodromoides minoricensis
- Pteromeris
  - †Pteromeris perplana
- Pteromylaeus
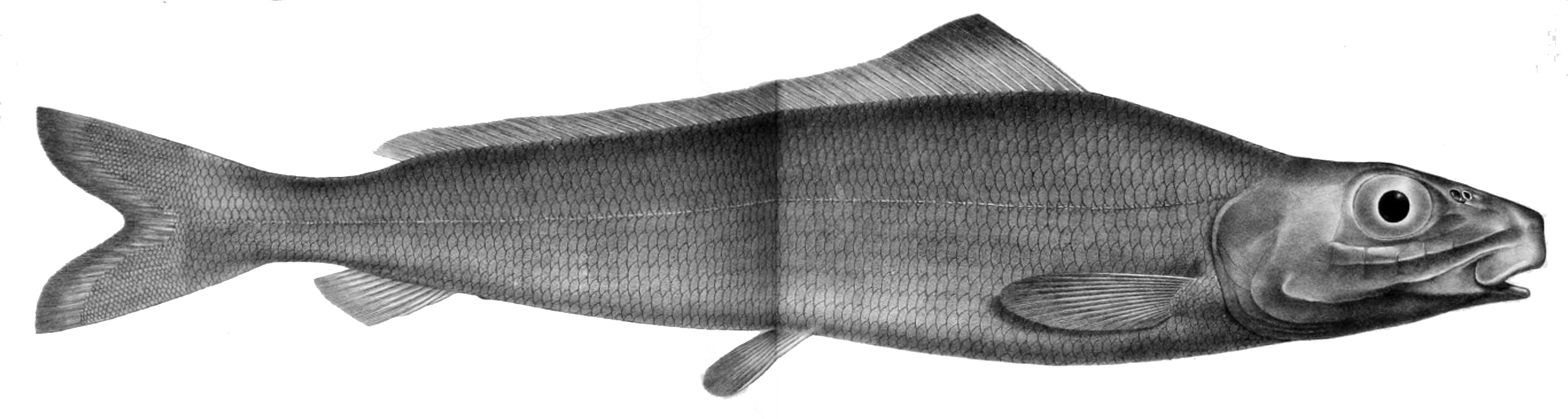
- Illustration of a living Pterothrissus gissu, or Japanese gissu
  Pterothrissus
- †Ptychosalpinx
- Puffinus
  - †Puffinus gravis – or unidentified related form
  - †Puffinus lherminieri
  - †Puffinus pacificoides – or unidentified related form
  - †Puffinus puffinus – or unidentified comparable form
  - †Puffinus tenuirostris – or unidentified related form
- Pugnus
- Puncturella
- Purpura
- Purpurellus
- Pusula
  - †Pusula pediculus
- Pycnodonte
- Pyramidella
- †Quadrans
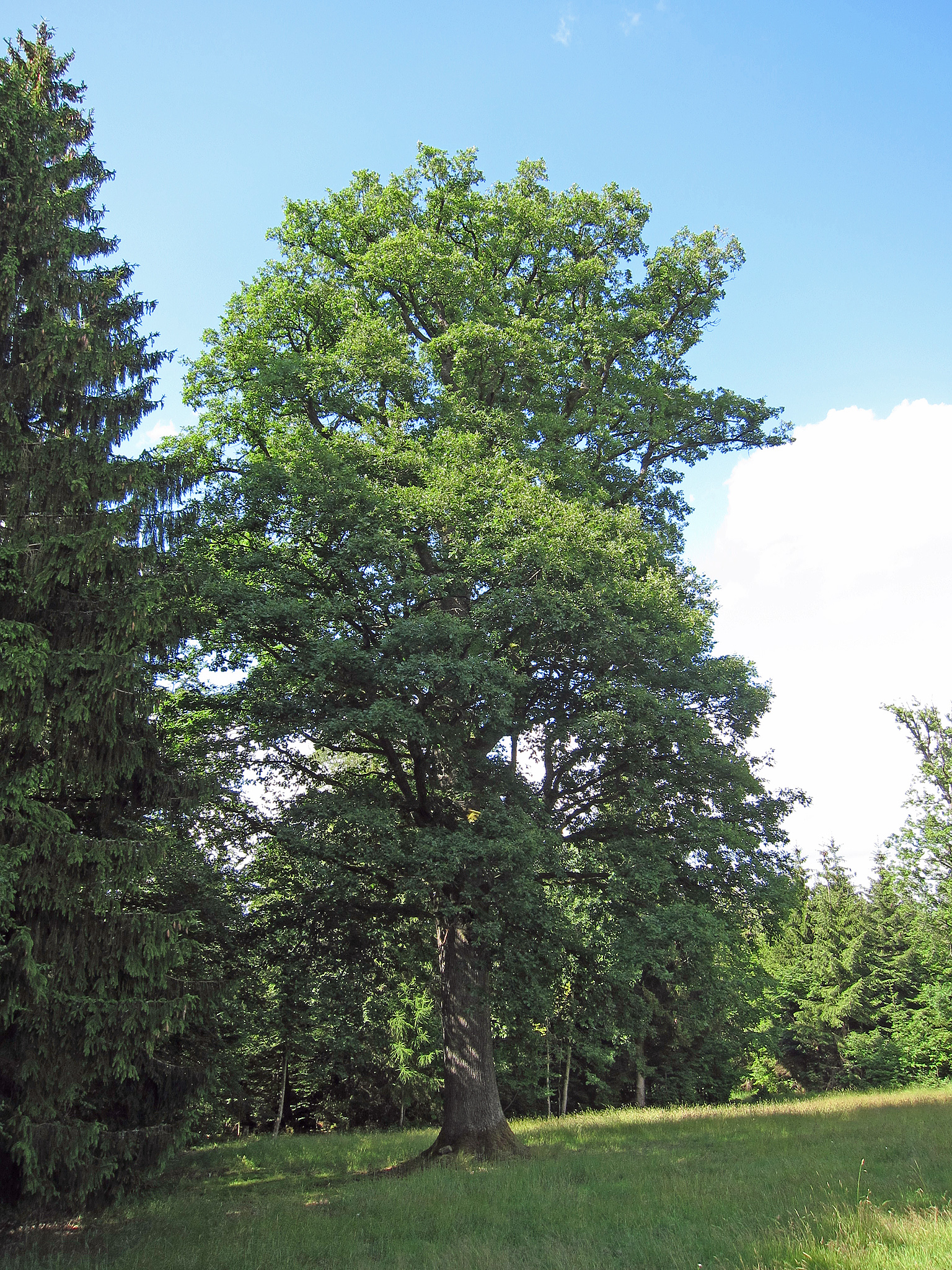
- A living Quercus, or oak tree
  Quercus
- Raja
- Rangia
- Ranina – type locality for genus
- Ranunculus
- Retilaskeya
  - †Retilaskeya bicolor
- Rhincodon
- Rhinobatos
- Rhinoptera
- Rhizoprionodon – tentative report
- Rhynchobatus
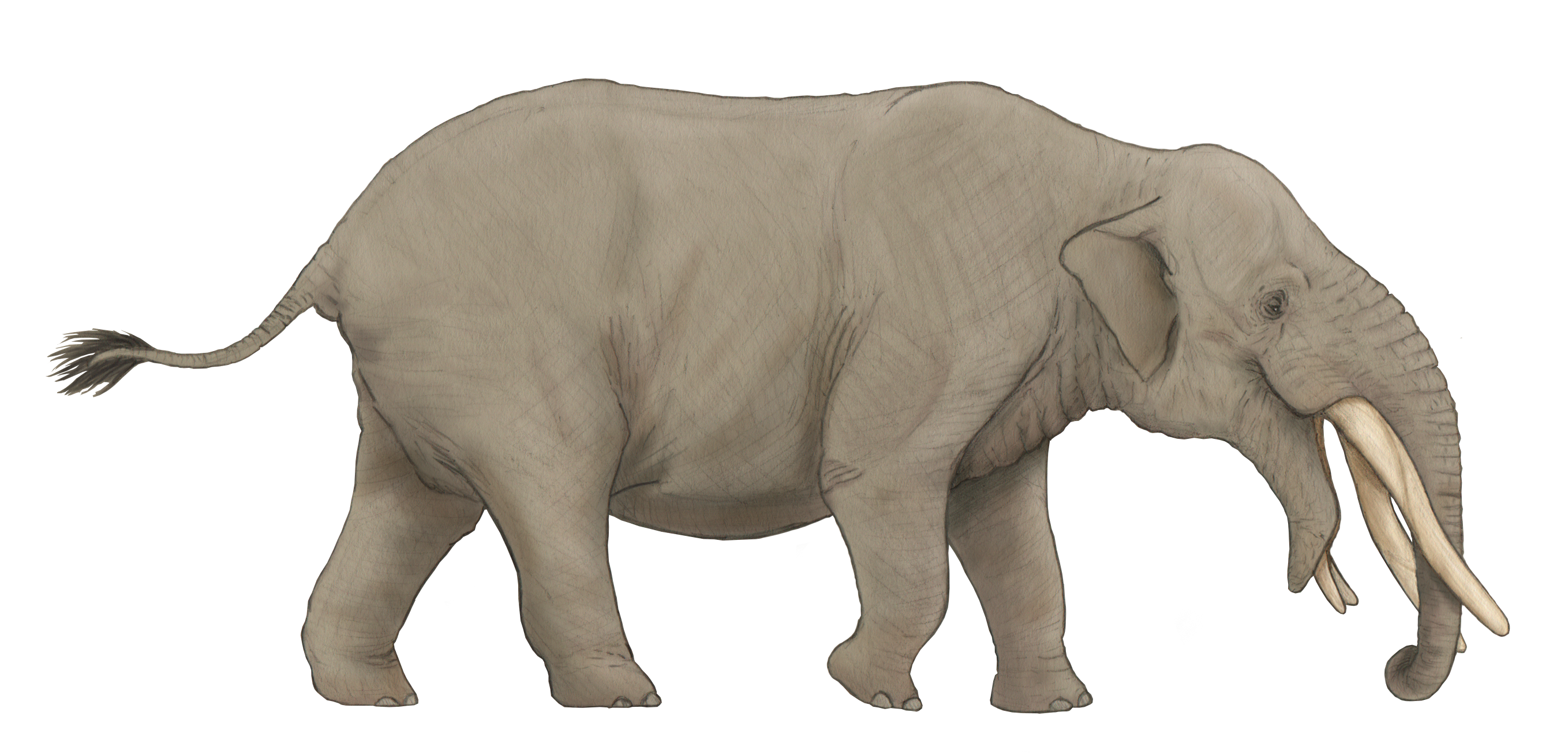
- Restoration of the Miocene-Pliocene elephant relative Rhynchotherium
  †Rhynchotherium
- Ringicula
- Rissoina
- †Robinia – type locality for genus
- Rosalina
- Sagittaria
- †Sanguisorba
  - †Sanguisorba canadensis
- †Sarda
  - †Sarda sarda – or unidentified related form
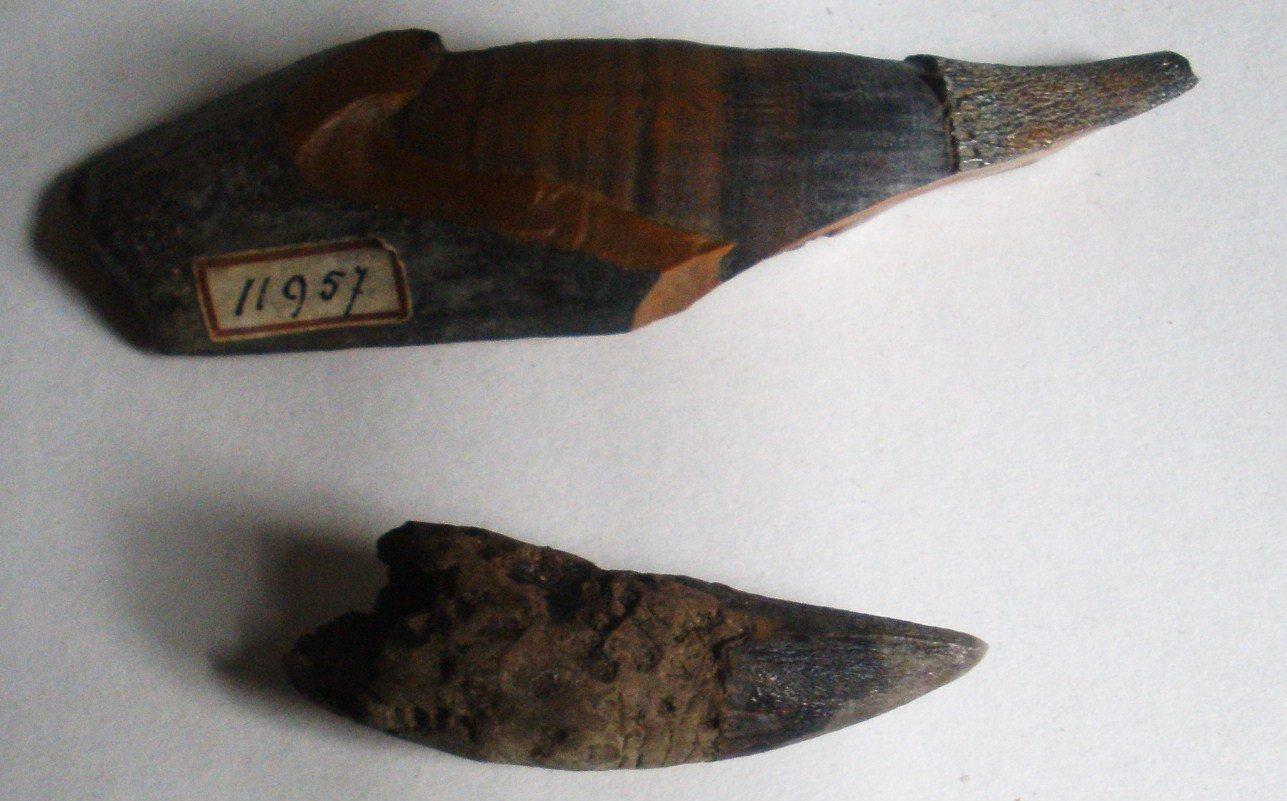
- Fossilized teeth of the Neogene sperm whale Scaldicetus
  †Scaldicetus – or unidentified comparable form
- Scaphella
- Schizaster
- Sciaenops
  - †Sciaenops ocellatus
- †Scoliodon
- Sconsia
- †Scutella
- Scyliorhinus
- Seila
  - †Seila adamsii
- Semele
- Semicassis
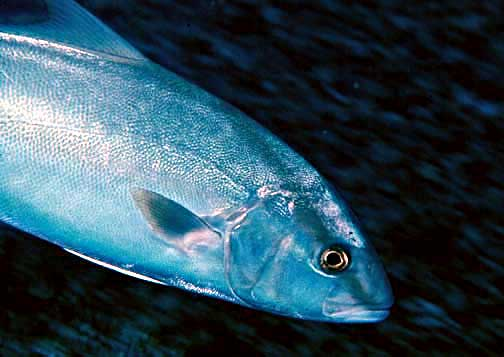
- A living Seriola, or amberjack
  Seriola
- Serpulorbis
- †Sheldonia – type locality for genus
- Siliqua
- Sinum
  - †Sinum perspectivum
- Siphonalia
- Siphonochelus
- Solariella
- Solen
- Solenosteira
  - †Solenosteira cancellaria
- Somateria
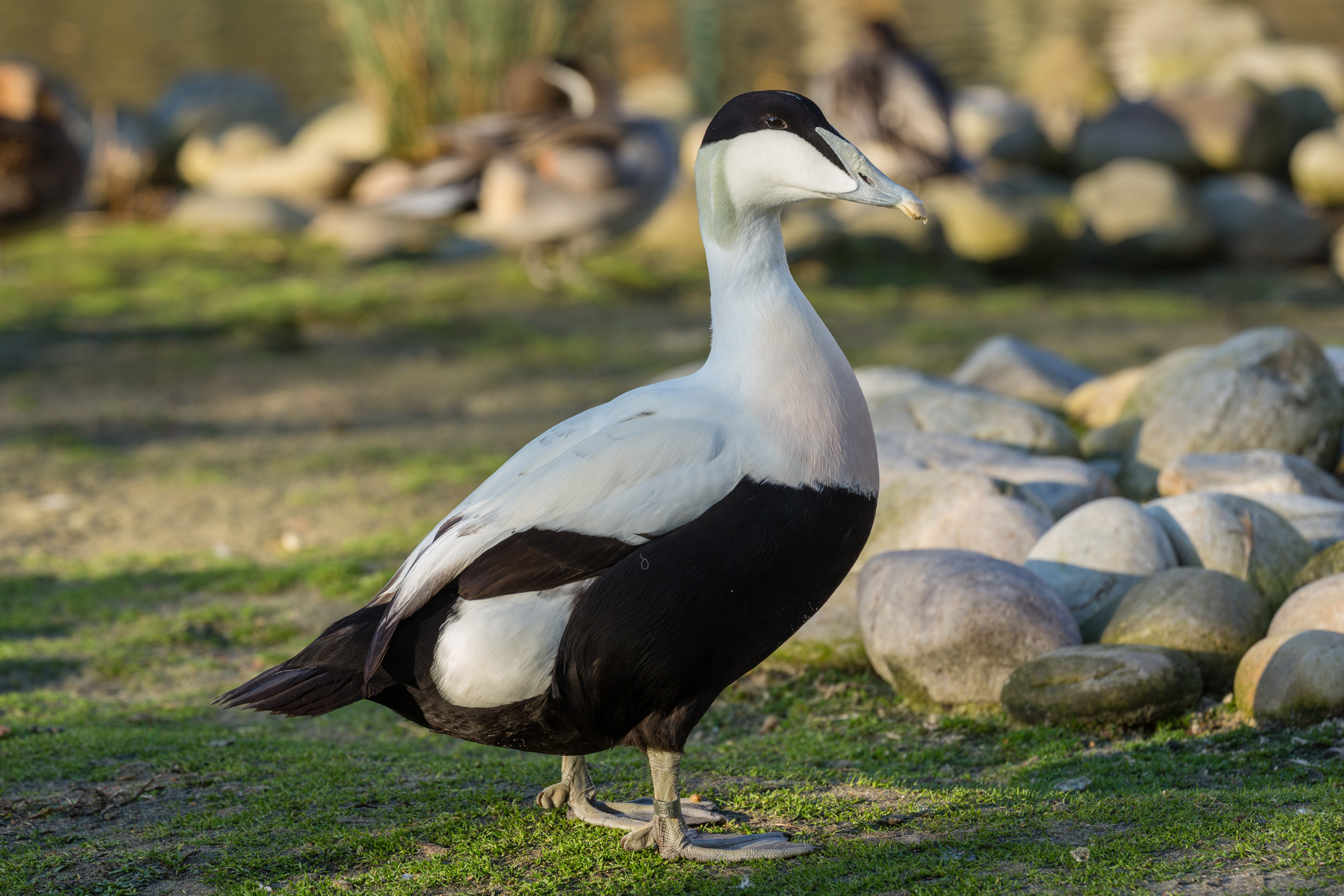
  - A living Somateria mollissima, or common eider
    †Somateria mollissima – or unidentified related form
- Sphagnum
- †Sphoeroides
- Sphyraena
  - †Sphyraena barracuda – or unidentified comparable form
- Sphyrna
  - †Sphyrna lewini
  - †Sphyrna media – or unidentified comparable form
  - †Sphyrna zygaena
- Spisula
- Spondylus
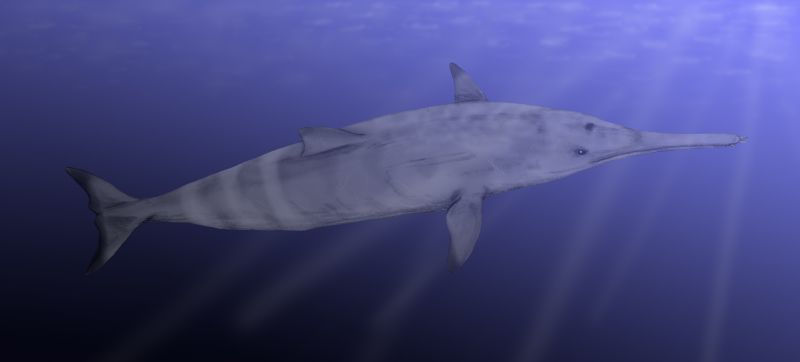
- Life restoration of the Oligocene-Miocene shark-toothed dolphin Squalodon
  †Squalodon
  - †Squalodon calvertensis
- Squalus
- Squatina
- Stellatoma – report made of unidentified related form or using admittedly obsolete nomenclature
  - †Stellatoma stellata
- †Stelletta
- Stenella
  - †Stenotomus chrysops – or unidentified comparable form
- Stercorarius
  - †Stercorarius longicaudus – or unidentified related form
  - †Stercorarius parasiticus – or unidentified related form
  - †Stercorarius pomarinus – or unidentified related form
- Sterna
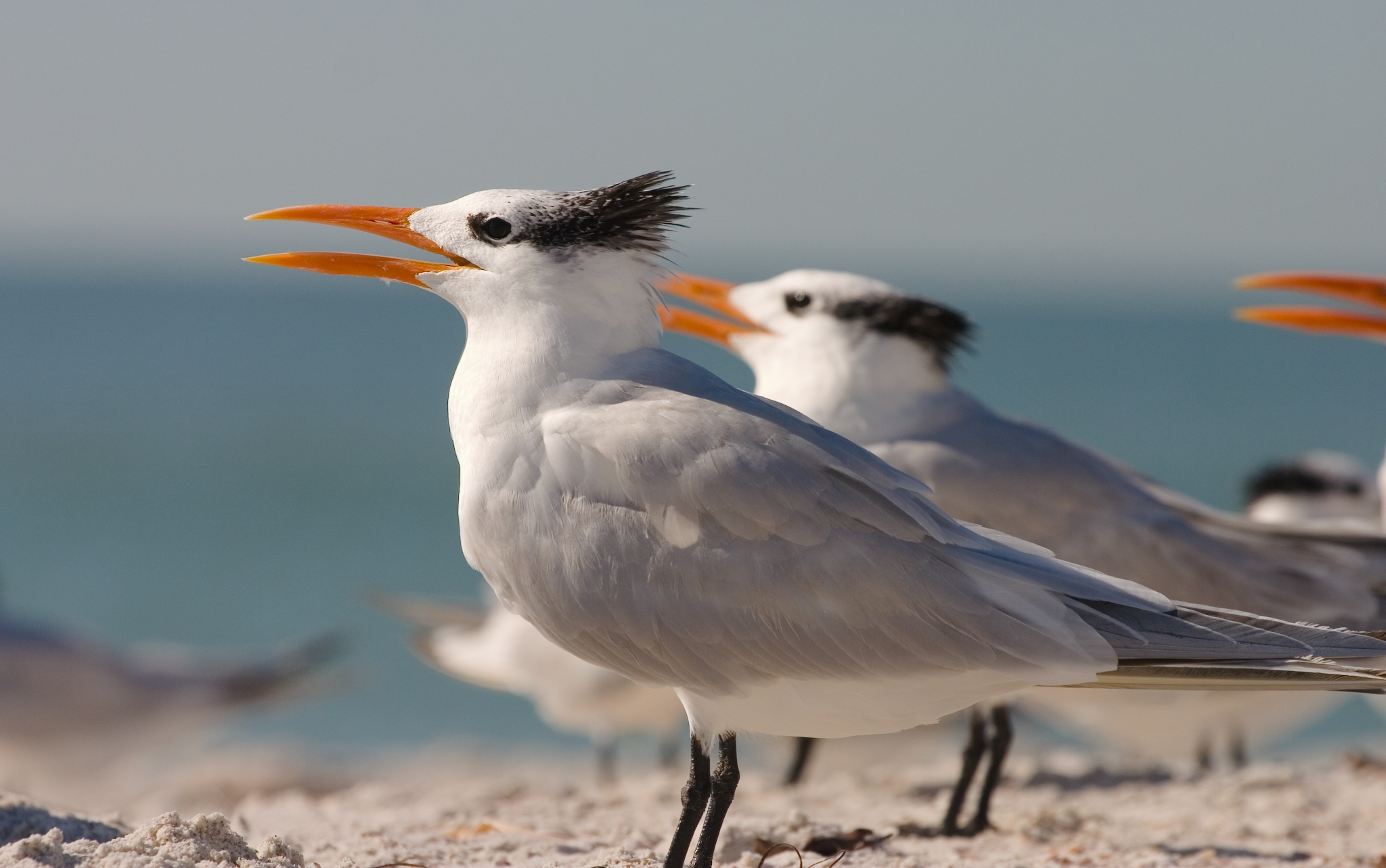
  - A living Thalasseus maximus, or royal tern
    †Sterna maxima – or unidentified related form
  - †Sterna nilotica – or unidentified related form
- Stewartia
- †Striatolamia
- Strioterebrum
- Strombiformis
- Strombina
- Strombus
- †Syllomus
- Symphurus
- Syntomodrillia
  - †Syntomodrillia lissotropis
- Tagelus
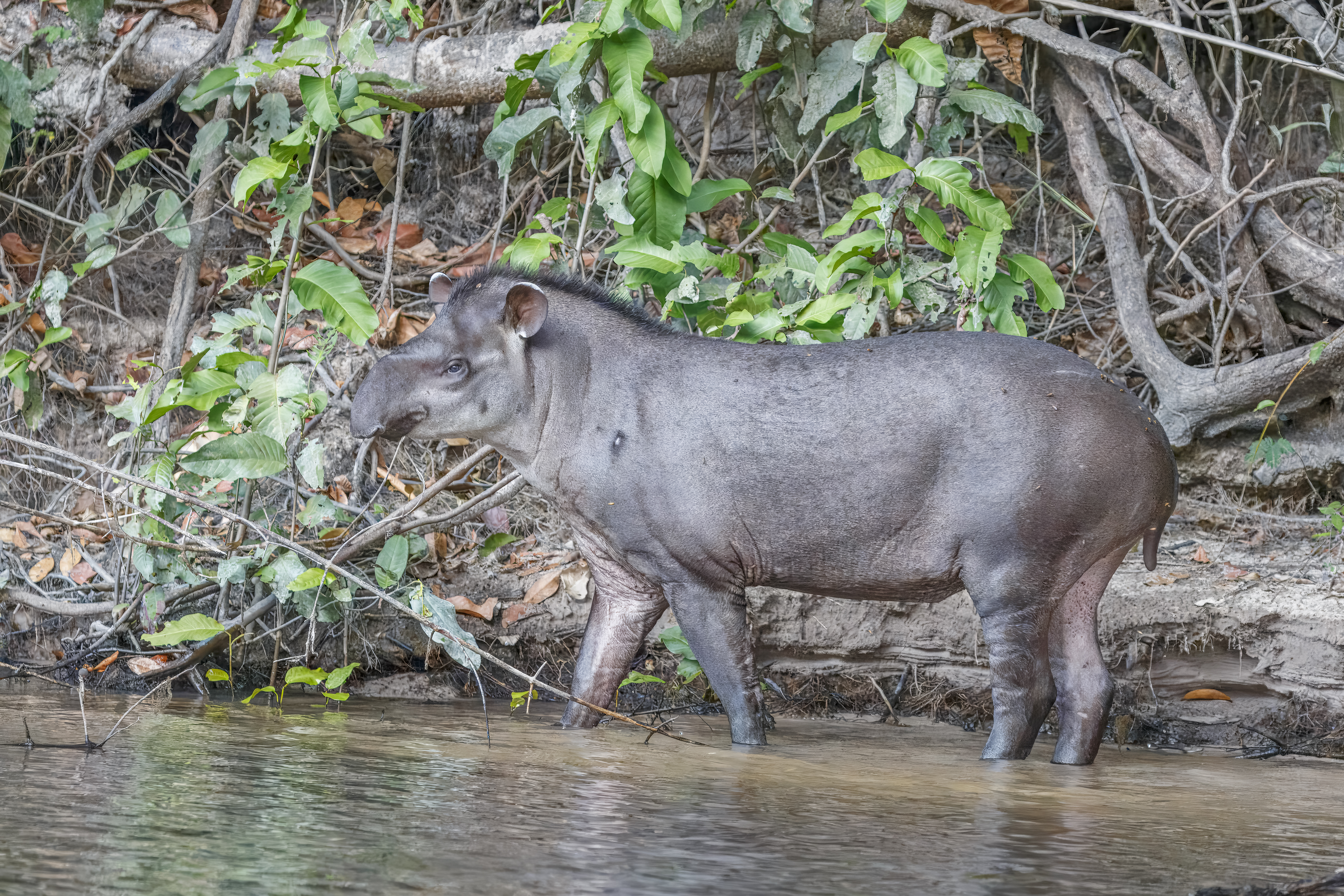
- A living Tapirus, or tapir
  Tapirus
  - †Tapirus veroensis
- Tautoga
  - †Tautoga onitis – or unidentified comparable form
- Taxodium
  - †Taxodium distichum
- Tectonatica
  - †Tectonatica pusilla
- Teinostoma
- Tellina
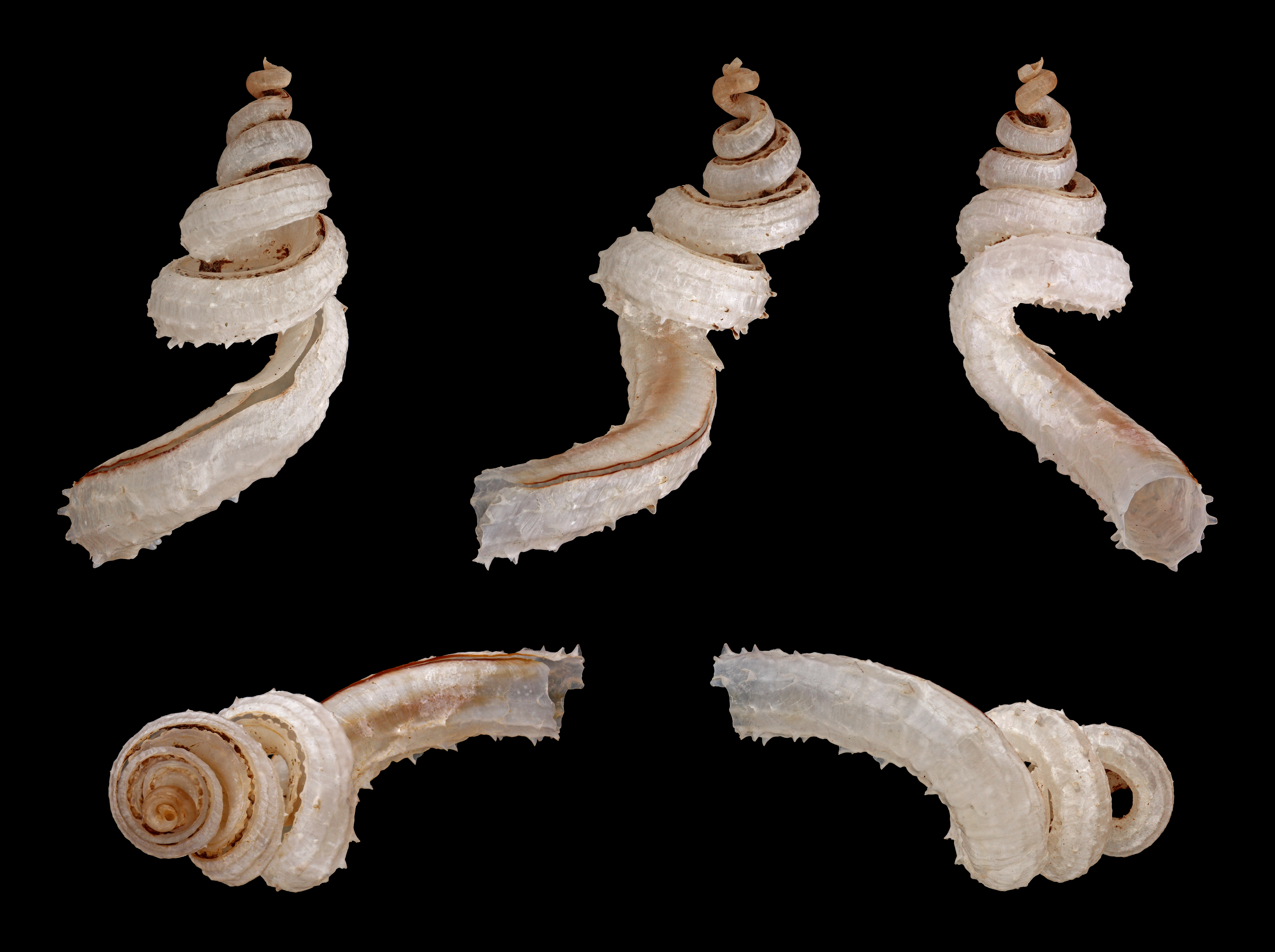
- Shell in multiple views of a Tenagodus sea snail
  Tenagodus
- Terebra
  - †Terebra protexta
- Terebratula
- †Tetraedron
- †Tetrapturus
  - †Tetrapturus albidus
- Thais
- †Thalassinoides
- †Thalassiosira
- †Thalictrum
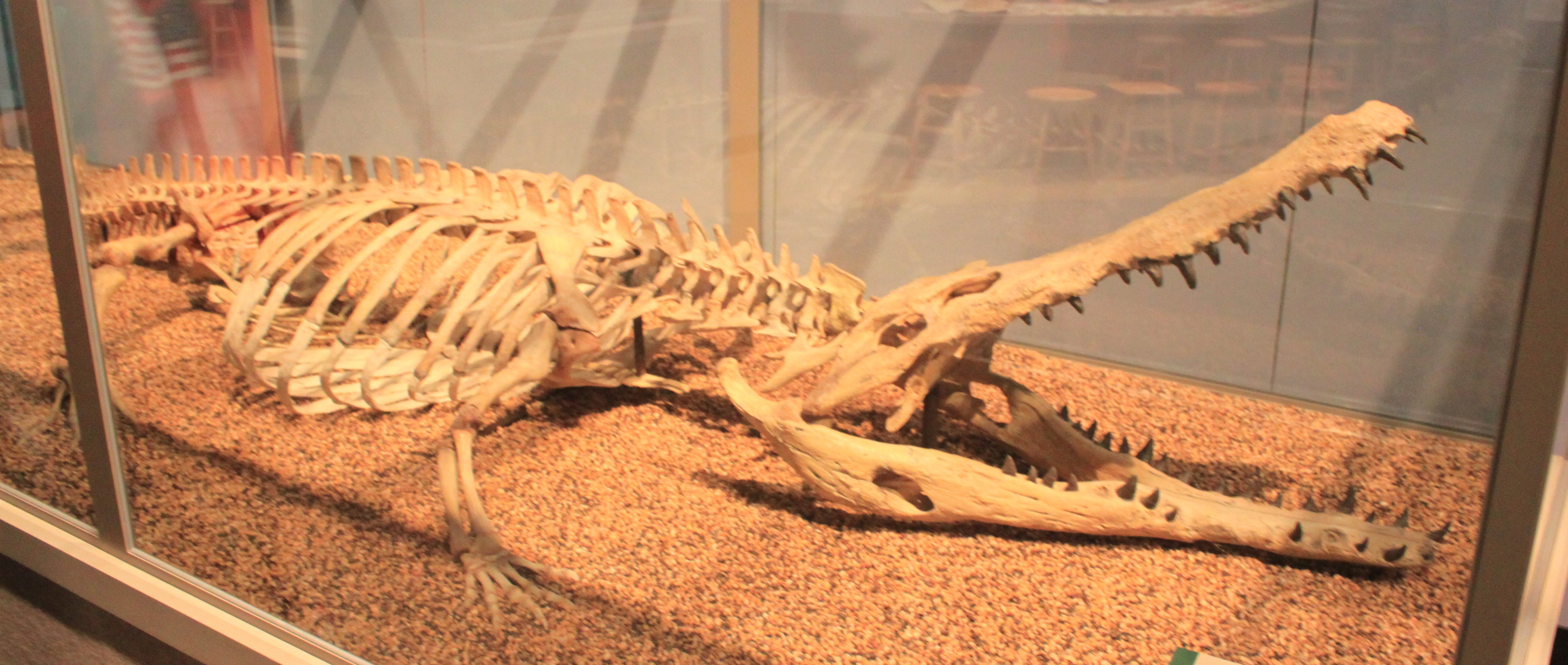
- Fossilized skeleton of the Oligocene-Miocene gavial relative Thecachampsa
  †Thecachampsa
  - †Thecachampsa antiqua
- Thracia
- Thunnus
  - †Thunnus thynnus
- Timoclea
- Trachycardium
  - †Trachycardium isocardia
  - †Trachycardium muricatum
- †Triaenodon
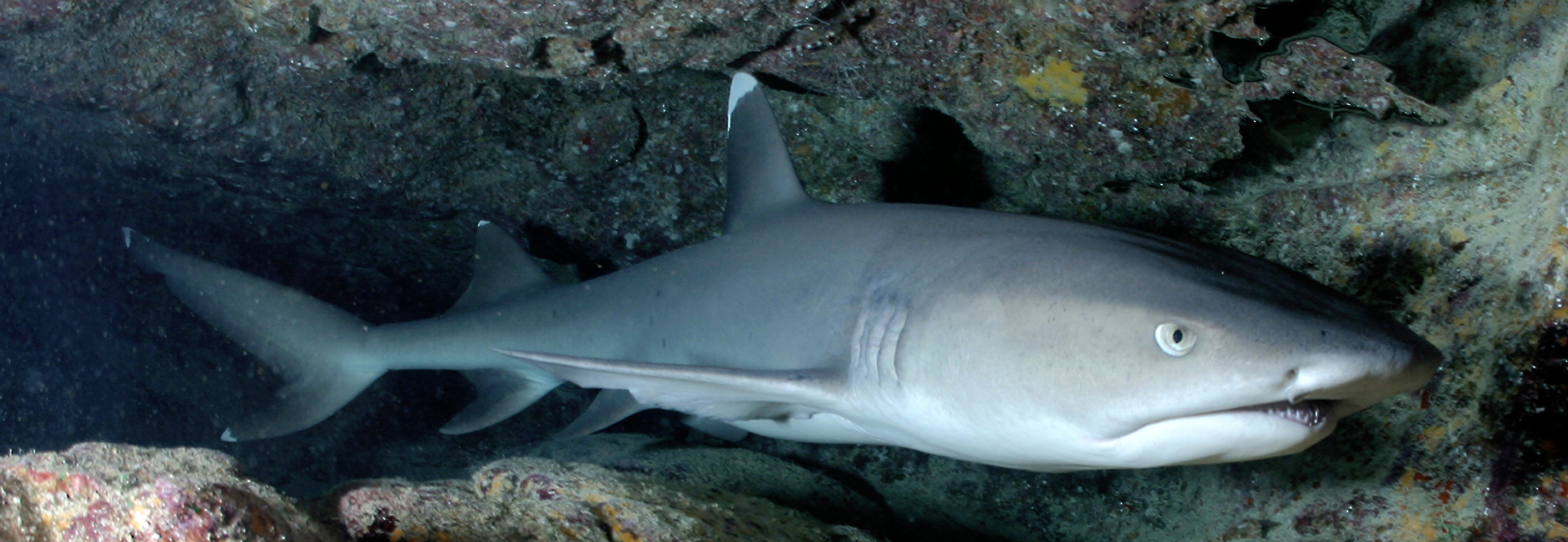
  - A living Triaenodon obesus, or whitetip reef shark
    †Triaenodon obesus
- Trigonostoma
- †Trinacria
- Tringa
  - †Tringa ochropus – or unidentified related form
- Trionyx
- Triphora
- Trochita
- Tucetona
- Turbo
  - †Turbo castanea
- Turbonilla
  - †Turbonilla abrupta
  - †Turbonilla interrupta
  - †Turbonilla nivea
- Turritella
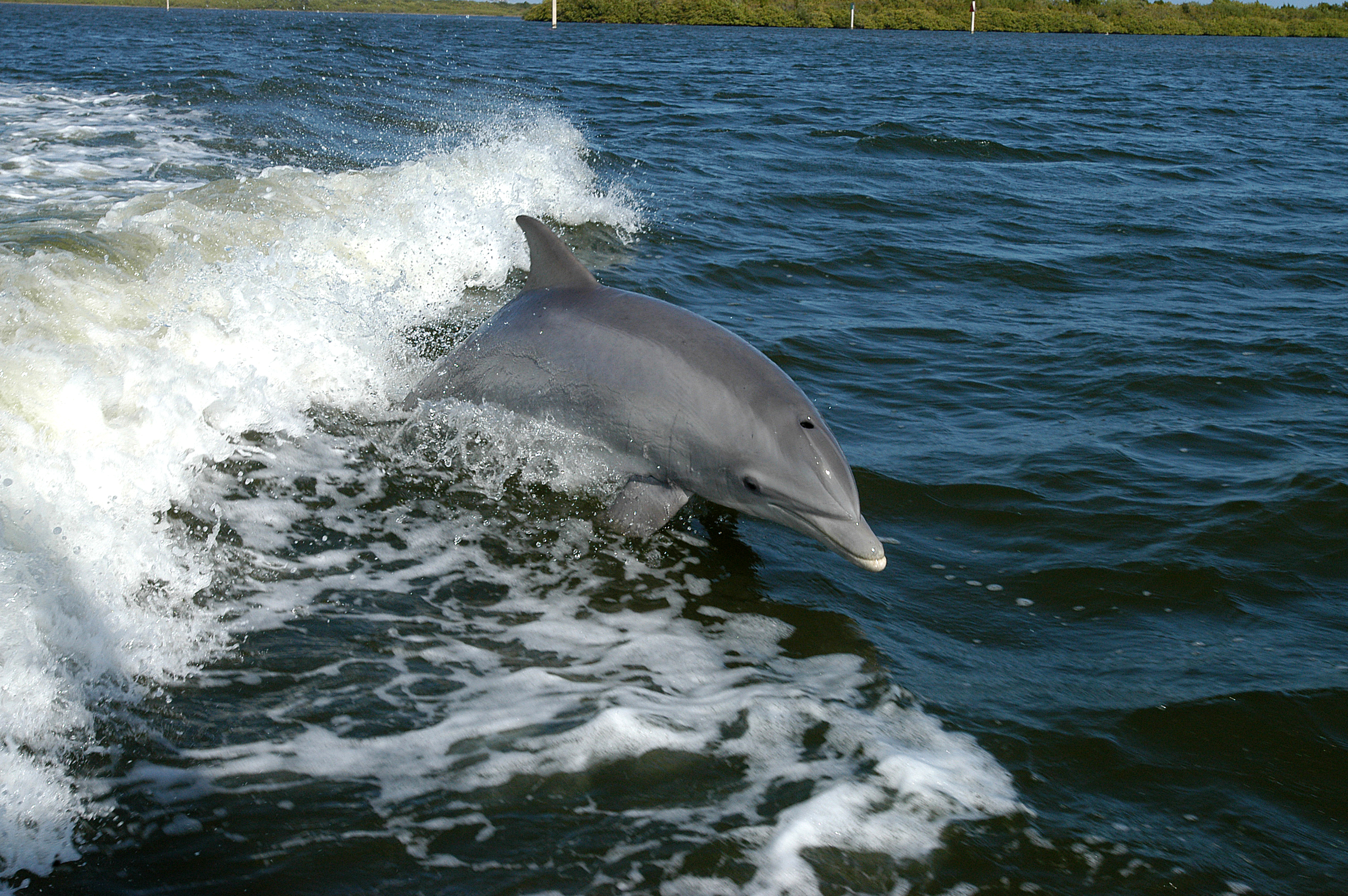
- A living Tursiops, or bottlenose dolphin
  Tursiops
- Typha
- Typhis
- Urophycis
  - †Urophycis tenuis
- Urosalpinx
  - †Urosalpinx cinerea
  - †Urosalpinx perrugata
- Vasum
- Venericardia
- Vermicularia
  - †Vermicularia knorrii – or unidentified comparable form
  - †Vermicularia spirata
- Verticordia
- Vexillum
  - †Vexillum wandoense
- †Viburnum
- Viviparus – tentative report
- Volutifusus
- Volvarina
  - †Volvarina avena
- Xenophora
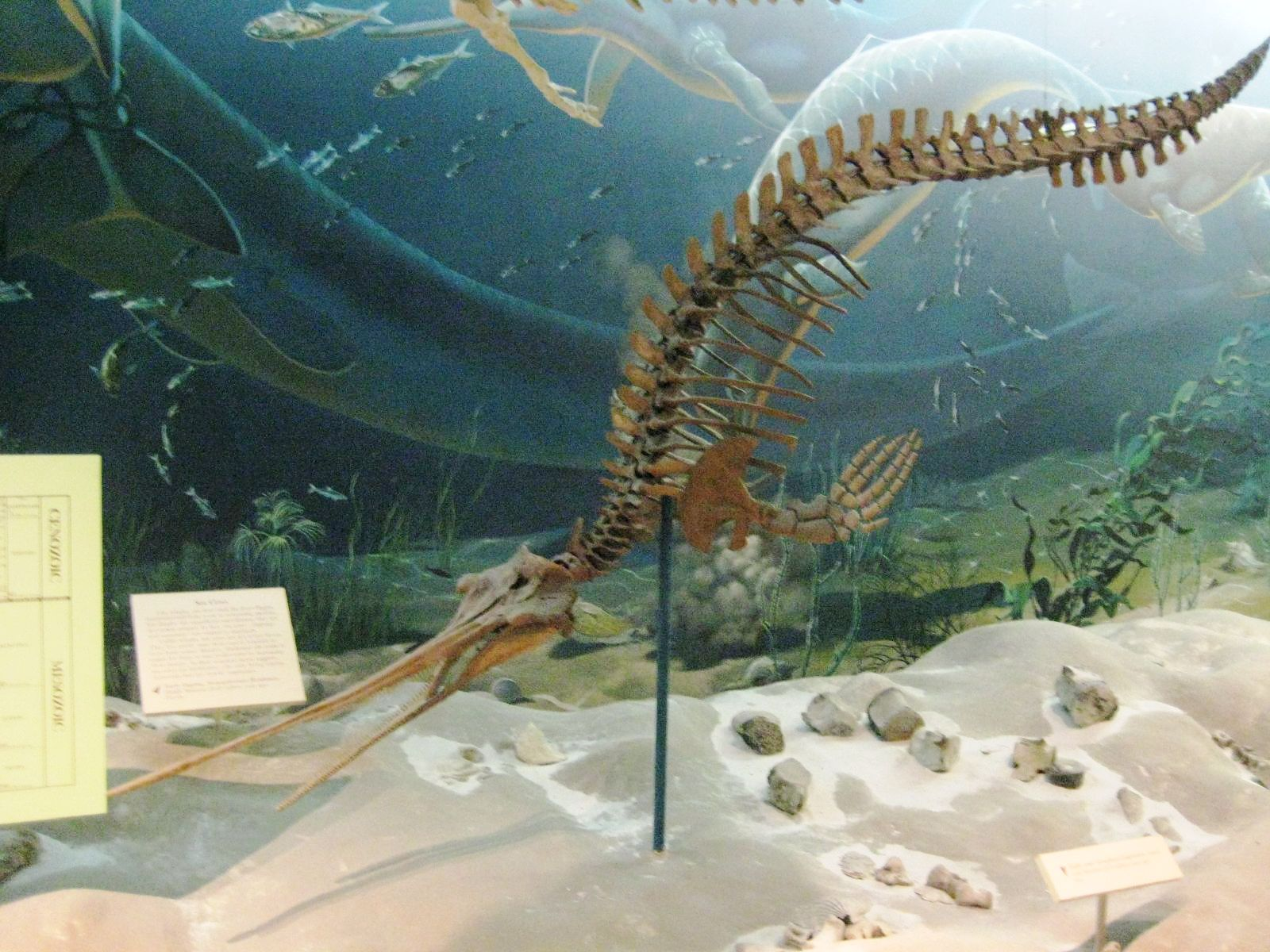
- Fossilized skeleton of the Miocene whale Xiphiacetus
  †Xiphiacetus
- Xiphias
  - †Xiphias gladius
- †Xiphiorhynchus
- Yoldia
  - †Yoldia limatula
- Ziphius
  - †Ziphius cavirostris – or unidentified comparable form
