= Hake =

Family of fishes

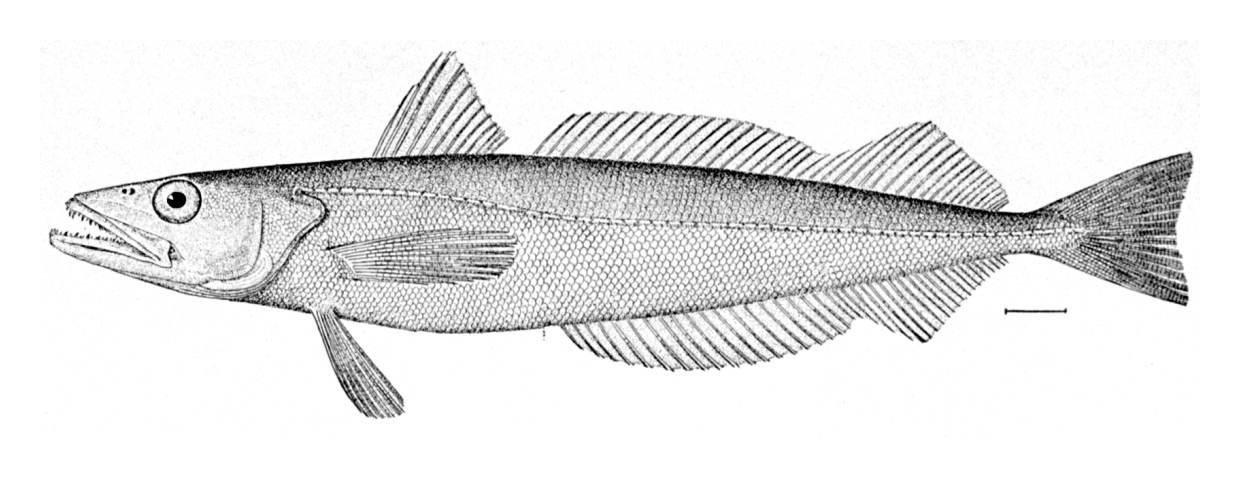
Silver hake, Merluccius bilinearis

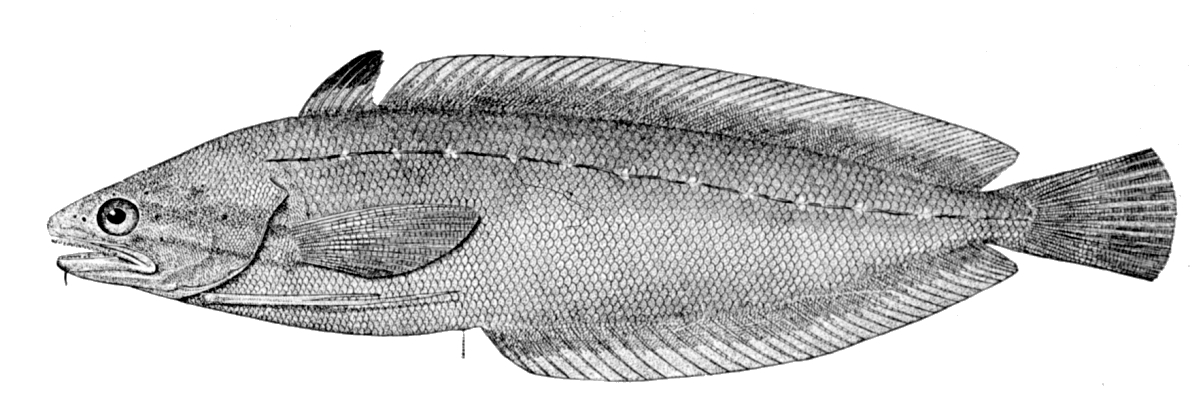
Spotted codling, Urophycis regia

Hake (/heɪk/) is the common name for fish in the Merlucciidae family of the northern and southern oceans and the Phycidae family (Note: Sometimes considered a subfamily of Gadidae.) of the northern oceans. Hake is a commercially important fish in the same taxonomic order, Gadiformes, as cod and haddock.

== Description ==
Hake are medium-to-large fish averaging from 0.5 to 3.6 kilograms (1 to 8 pounds) in weight, with specimens as large as 27 kg (60 lb). The fish can grow up to 1 metre (3 ft 3 in) in length with a lifespan of as long as 14 years.

Hake may be found in the Atlantic Ocean and Pacific Ocean in waters from 200 to 350 metres (660 to 1,150 ft) deep. The fish stay in deep water during the day and come to shallower depths during the night. An undiscerning predator, hake feed on prey found near or on the bottom of the sea. Male and female hake are very similar in appearance.

After spawning, the hake eggs float on the surface of the sea where the larvae develop. After a certain period of time, the baby hake then migrate to the bottom of the sea, preferring depths of less than 200 metres (656 ft).

== Merlucciidae ==
A total of 13 hake species are known in the family Merlucciidae:

- Argentine hake (Merluccius hubbsi), found off Argentina
- Benguela hake (Merluccius polli), found off South Africa
- Deep-water hake (Merluccius paradoxus) found in the southern Atlantic Ocean
- European hake (Merluccius merluccius), found off the Atlantic coast of Europe and western North Africa, in the Mediterranean Sea, and in the Black Sea
- Gayi hake (Merluccius gayi), found in the North Pacific Ocean
- North Pacific hake (Merluccius productus), found in the North Pacific
- Offshore hake (Merluccius albidus), found off the United States
- Panama hake (Merluccius angustimanus), found in the Eastern Pacific
- Senegalese hake (Merluccius senegalensis), found off the Atlantic coast of western North Africa
- Shallow-water hake (Merluccius capensis), found in the southern Atlantic Ocean
- Silver hake (Merluccius bilinearis), found in the Northwest Atlantic Ocean
- Southern hake (Merluccius australis), found off Chile and off New Zealand

== Commercial use ==
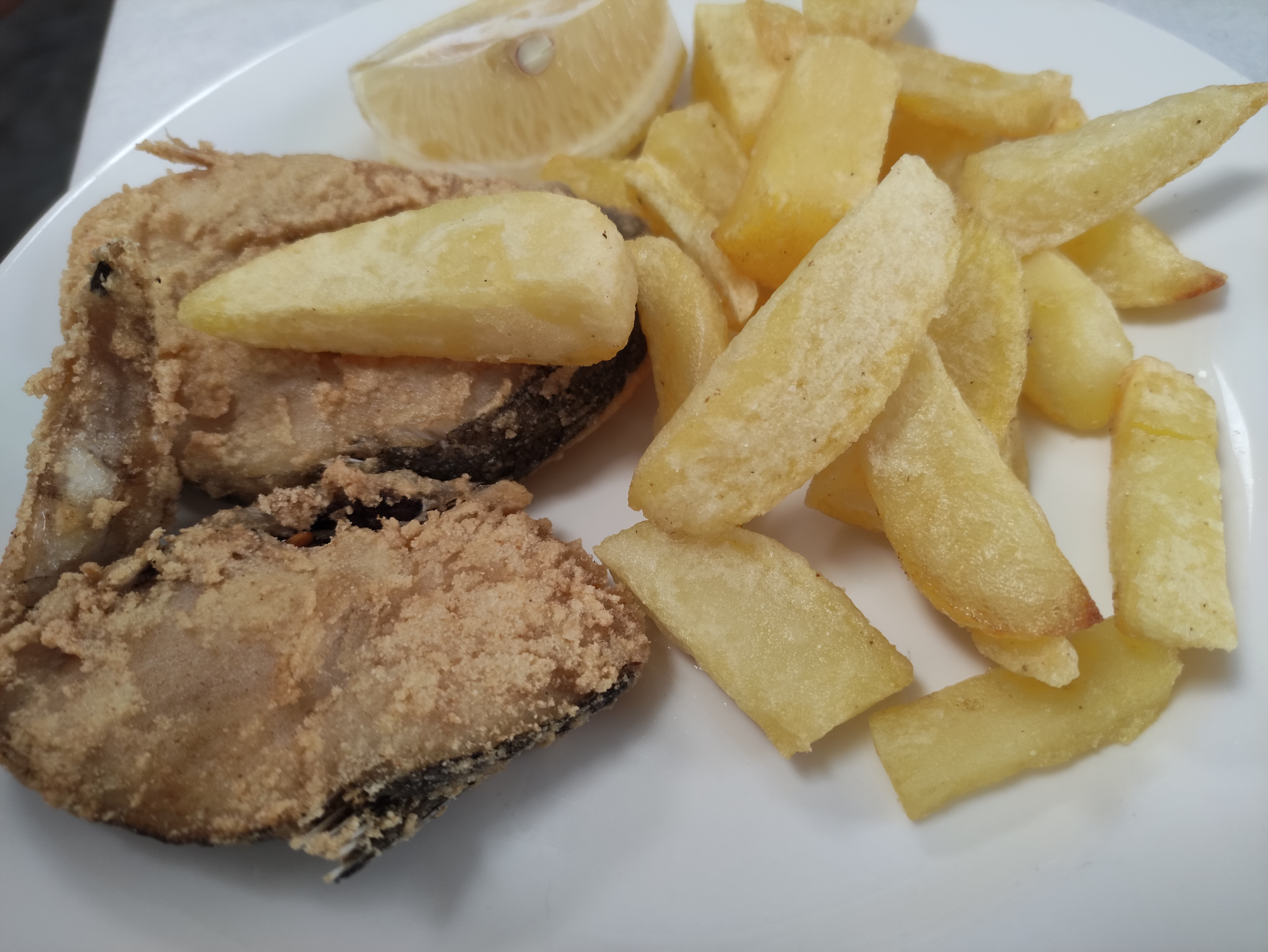
Battered hake from Valencia.

Not all hake species are viewed as commercially important, but the deep-water and shallow-water hakes are known to grow rapidly and make up the majority of harvested species. Indicators of quality in hake products for human consumption include white flesh free of signs of browning, dryness, or grayness, and with a fresh, seawater smell. Hake is sold as frozen, fillets or steaks, fresh, smoked, or salted.

=== Fisheries ===
The main catching method of deep-water hake is primarily trawling, and shallow-water hake is mostly caught by inshore trawl and longlining. Hake are mostly found in the Southwest Atlantic (Argentina and Uruguay), Southeast Pacific (Chile and Peru), Southeast Atlantic (Namibia and South Africa), Southwest Pacific (New Zealand), and Mediterranean and Black Sea (Italy, Portugal, Spain, Greece and France).

=== Over-exploitation ===
Due to overfishing, Argentine hake catches have declined drastically. About 80% of adult hake has apparently disappeared from Argentine waters. Argentine hake is not expected to disappear, but the stock may be so low that it is no longer economical for commercial fishing. In addition, this adversely affects Argentine employment, because of many jobs in the fishing industries. Conversely, Argentine hake prices rose due to hake scarcity, reducing exports and affecting the economy.

In Chile, seafood exports, especially Chilean hake, have decreased dramatically. Hake export has decreased by almost 19 percent. The main cause of this decline is the February 2010 Chile earthquake and tsunami. These disasters destroyed most processing plants, especially manufacturing companies that produce fish meal and frozen fillets.

European hake catches are well below historical levels because of hake depletion in the Mediterranean and Black Sea. Various factors might have caused this decline, including a too-high total allowable catch, unsustainable fishing, ecological problems, juvenile catches, or non-registered catches.

Namibia is the only country that has increased its hake quota, from 130,000 tonnes (130,000 long tons; 140,000 short tons) in 2009 to 145,000 tonnes (143,000 long tons; 160,000 short tons) in 2010. Furthermore, the Namibian Ministry of Fisheries adheres to strict rules regarding the catch of hake. For example, the closed seasons for hake lasts approximately two months, in September and October, depending on the level of stock. This rule has been applied to ensure the regrowth of the hake population. Supplemental restrictions forbid trawling for Hake in waters less than 200 metres (656 ft) deep (to avoid damaging non-target species habitat) and to minimize by-catch.

== Human introduction to non-native areas ==
Frank Forrester's Fishermens' Guide in 1885 mentions a hake that was transplanted from the coast of Ireland to Cape Cod on the coast of Massachusetts in the United States. It is uncertain which species it was, but the Fishermens' Guide stated:

This is an Irish salt water fish, similar in appearance to the tom cod. In Galway bay, and other sea inlets of Ireland, the hake is exceedingly abundant, and is taken in great numbers. It is also found in England and France. Since the Irish immigration to America, the hake has followed in the wake of their masters, as it is now found in New York bay, in the waters around Boston, and off Cape Cod. Here it is called the stock fish, and the Bostonians call them poor Johns. [...] It is a singular fact that until within a few years this fish was never seen in America. It does not grow as large here as in Europe, though here they are from ten to eighteen inches [250 to 460 mm] in length. [...] The general color of this fish is a reddish brown, with some golden tints—the sides being of a pink silvery luster.
