= Lyconus brachycolus =

Conservation status
- Data Deficient (IUCN 3.1)

Scientific classification
- Kingdom: Animalia
- Phylum: Chordata
- Class: Actinopterygii
- Order: Gadiformes
- Family: Lyconidae
- Genus: Lyconus
- Species: L. brachycolus

Binomial name
- Lyconus brachycolus (Holt & Byrne, 1906)

Synonyms
- Macruronus (Cynogadus) brachycolus Holt & Byrne, 1906; Macruronus brachycolus Holt & Byrne, 1906; Macruronus caninus Maul, 1951

Species of fish

Lyconus brachycolus is a species of hake fish in the family Merlucciidae.

== Description ==
Lyconus brachycolus is silvery in colour, with a black median line. It is up to 52.5 cm (20.7 in) in length with 9–11 dorsal soft rays and a small caudal fin. The specific name brachycolus means "short colon."

== Habitat ==
Lyconus brachycolus lives in the Atlantic Ocean, most commonly being found off Ireland and Madeira; it is bathydemersal, living at 150–997 m (492–3,271 ft).
