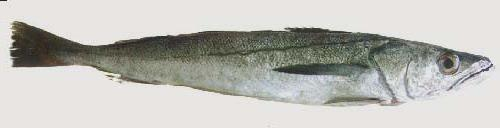

Conservation status
- Data Deficient (IUCN 3.1)

Scientific classification
- Kingdom: Animalia
- Phylum: Chordata
- Class: Actinopterygii
- Order: Gadiformes
- Family: Merlucciidae
- Genus: Merluccius
- Species: M. gayi

Binomial name
- Merluccius gayi (Guichenot, 1848)
- Range of M. g. gayi (green), M. g. peruanus (red), and some related species (blue)

Synonyms
- Merlus gayi Guichenot, 1848; Epicopus gayi (Guichenot, 1848)

= Merluccius gayi =

Species of fish

Global capture production of South Pacific hake (Merluccius gayi) in thousand tonnes from 1950 to 2022, as reported by the FAO

Merluccius gayi is a merluccid hake of the genus Merluccius, with two subspecies, the South Pacific hake or Chilean common hake (M. g. gayi) and the Peruvian hake (M. g. peruanus), found in the south-western Pacific Ocean, along the coast of South America, from Peru (Merluccius gayi peruanus) to the Chilean coasts north to the Chiloé Archipelago. During the Southern Hemisphere summer, it migrates southwards in shallow waters, while in the winter, it lives more to the north, in far deeper waters.

M. gayi is very similar to the European hake (Merluccius merluccius). They feed on crustaceans, cephalopods, and other fish.

Since at least 2023 stocks of Merluccius gayi gayi in Chile are depleted causing concern among artisanal fishers.
