= Merluccius hernandezi =

Conservation status
- Data Deficient (IUCN 3.1)

Scientific classification
- Kingdom: Animalia
- Phylum: Chordata
- Class: Actinopterygii
- Order: Gadiformes
- Family: Merlucciidae
- Genus: Merluccius
- Species: M. hernandezi

Binomial name
- Merluccius hernandezi Mattews, 1985

Species of fish

Merluccius hernandezi, the Cortez hake, is a species of fish from the family Merlucciidae, the true hakes. It is endemic to the Gulf of California where it can be found in the epipelagic and mesopelagic zones over the continental shelf, open sea, and sea mounts, to a depth of around 300m. It is a small species which has been referred to as a "dwarf hake" and is of little interest to fisheries, other than small scale local fisheries. It was described in 1985 and small hake in the Gulf of California were previously considered to be Panama hakes (Merluccius angustimanus). This species differs from the Panama hake in that in juveniles the caudal fin has a central lobe and is truncate in adults, whereas the caudal fin is emarginate in the Panama hake, its pectoral fin projects well beyond the anus in but does not do so in the Panama hake.
