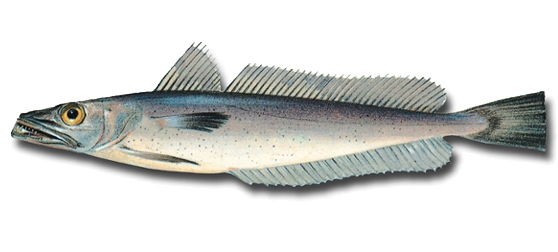

Scientific classification
- Kingdom: Animalia
- Phylum: Chordata
- Class: Actinopterygii
- Order: Gadiformes
- Family: Merlucciidae
- Genus: Merluccius
- Species: M. hubbsi

Binomial name
- Merluccius hubbsi Marini, 1933

= Argentine hake =

Species of fish

Global capture production of Argentine hake (Merluccius hubbsi) in thousand tonnes from 1950 to 2022, as reported by the FAO

The Argentine hake (Merluccius hubbsi) is a species of merluccid hake found in the southwestern Atlantic Ocean, specifically along the coast of Argentina and Uruguay. Like many of its congeners, it is of commercial importance.

== Taxonomy ==
The Argentine hake was described by the Argentine ichthyologist Tomás Marini in 1933, with the specific epithet honoring the American ichthyologist Carl L. Hubbs, who supplied the type material to Marini.

A new species of hake, Merluccius patagonicus, was described in 2003; this was the third hake species found in the southwest Atlantic, in addition to the Argentine hake and the southern hake (Merluccius australis). Some authorities consider this taxon to be synonymous with M. hubbsi.

== Description ==
The Argentine hake is very similar to the European hake (Merluccius merluccius), and it can reach up to 95 cm in length (though a length of 50-65 cm is more common) and weigh up to 5 kg.

== Biology ==
The Argentine hake lives at depths of 100-200 m, feeding on crustaceans, squids and smaller fish (anchovies and smaller hakes). It migrates southwards in spring and northwards in autumn. Females grow faster and live longer than males.

== Relationship with humans ==
The Argentine hake is commercially important, and is usually sold fresh; however, it can also be sold frozen. It is one of the main fishing exports of Argentina.
