= South African Deep Sea Trawling Industry Association =

The South African Deep-Sea Trawling Industry Association (SADSTIA) represents the trawler owners and operators active in the offshore demersal trawl fishery for hake, the most valuable of South Africa's commercial fisheries, contributing approximately 45 percent of the value of fishery production. Based in Cape Town, South Africa, SADSTIA currently has 32 members that catch, process and market the Cape hakes, Merluccius paradoxus and Merluccius capensis as well as several bycatch species.

== The offshore demersal trawl fishery for hake ==
In South Africa, hake is targeted by four distinct fisheries: the offshore and inshore demersal trawl fisheries, and the hake longline and hake handline sectors. The offshore demersal trawl fishery is by far the biggest of the four. Approximately 84% of the hake total allowable catch (TAC) is allocated to the offshore demersal trawl fishery. The inshore trawl and hake longline fisheries are each allocated approximately 6% of the TAC and the handline fishery presently accounts for about 3% of the allocation, although this has not been caught in recent years. Trawling for hake takes place in a near continuous band on well-established grounds that extend from the Namibian border on the west coast to the extreme eastern part of the Agulhas Bank off the south-east coast. Exploitation is predominantly at depths of between 300 and 800m on the west coast and less than 200m on the south coast. The offshore demersal trawl fleet consists of 53 trawlers. Twenty six fresh fish trawlers preserve hake on ice and return it to shore for processing, while 27 freezer vessels produce frozen headed and gutted (H&G) hake or sea-frozen fillets. The gear configuration consists of “otter trawls” – gear towed along the seabed with trawl doors (or otter boards) keeping the mouth of the net open. Trawlers generally tow their nets at 3.5 knots for one to three hours, mainly in daylight when targeting hake. Trawling occurs mainly over sandy sediments, but areas of muddy substrate and coarser, gravely substrates are also trawled. A five-year benthic trawl experiment was implemented between 2014 and 2019 with the purpose of determining the environmental impact of demersal trawling in South African waters. It was implemented by SADSTIA in partnership with the South African Department of Forestry, Fisheries and the Environment, the University of Cape Town, the South African Environmental Observation Network and the South African National Biodiversity Institute. The catch of the offshore demersal trawl sector amounts to approximately 130 000 tonnes per year (2013 catches) although this has varied between 118 000 and 166 000 tonnes, and consists of approximately 90% M. paradoxus and 10% M. capensis. The main bycatch species are kingklip (Genypterus capensis) and monk (Lophius vomerinus). Trawler owners and operators produce a mix of fresh and frozen products, supplying them to retail and food-service markets both locally and internationally. The main export markets are in Europe, Australia and the United States.

== A representative industry body ==
SADSTIA represents 99.6% of the rights holders in the offshore demersal trawl fishery for hake. The Association interacts with government, non-governmental organizations (NGOs) and other interested parties for the benefit of its members. SADSTIA maintains a professional relationship with a number of scientific and management organisations, which enables it to comment and provide advice on a wide range of issues pertinent to the offshore demersal trawl fishery in particular, or the South African fishing industry as a whole. An executive committee is responsible for the management of SADSTIA and a chairman and/or deputy chairman and executive secretary take care of the day-to-day running of the Association.

Since its founding in 1974, SADSTIA has played a central role in the growth and development of the offshore demersal trawl fishery. For example, the Association was instrumental in harnessing industry and government support for the assessment and accreditation of the South African trawl fishery for hake by the Marine Stewardship Council (MSC). The MSC is an independent non-profit organisation that sets a standard for sustainable fishing. The South African trawl fishery for hake achieved MSC certification in 2004 and was re-certified as sustainable and well-managed in 2010, 2015 and 2021. The expansion by SADSTIA members into markets in northern Europe (Germany and Switzerland for example) has largely been on the strength of the fishery's MSC certification.

== Transformation of the industry ==
SADSTIA is governed by a constitution that was adopted on 24 March 1974 and updated on 12 September 2002. This was in recognition of the fact that circumstances in South Africa and in the fishing industry changed considerably after 1994, the year of South Africa's transition to democracy. In fact, the structure of the offshore demersal trawl fishery has changed substantially since 1994, in keeping with South African laws and guidelines on black economic empowerment. A study published by the independent empowerment research and rating agency, Empowerdex, in April 2019 found that black shareholding is at least 66.6%. A study by independent economists, Genesis Analytics, updated this figure to 66.8% in 2020. This is in stark contrast to the period pre-1990 when only a handful of companies held rights in the fishery – all of them large and white-owned. Today, there are 33 rights holders in the fishery. These may be broadly separated into three categories: smaller companies that supply the domestic market with minimally processed hake; medium-sized companies that operate as wholesalers, serving both domestic and international markets; and large companies with sophisticated, vertically integrated operations that process hake for local and international retail markets.

== Investment and opportunities ==
The offshore demersal trawl fishery generates annual sales of hake of R4.3 billion (US$307 million). Approximately 6 600 South Africans are directly employed by SADSTIA members, while another 5 800 indirect jobs are created in associated industries. Jobs are in coastal areas, including Cape Town, Saldanha, Gansbaai, Mossel Bay and Gqebehra. Investments in trawlers and processing facilities by SADSTIA members are believed to amount to R7.6 billion (US$540 million). Workers employed in the South African offshore and inshore demersal trawl fisheries are well compensated compared to others in the fishing industry. This is because fishing is not seasonal and employment is generally on a permanent basis. And, although most fisheries workers in South Africa do not enjoy the provisions of the Basic Conditions of Employment Act of 1997, a unique labour relations framework has been established for seagoing workers in the offshore demersal and inshore trawl fisheries. A Bargaining Council was established in 2001 and a Collective Agreement, that sets out basic conditions of employment – such as set daily wages for each category of worker, set hours of work and regulated rest and leave periods – has been in effect since 2 May 2003.

== Management of the fishery ==
The offshore demersal trawl fishery for hake has been tightly managed and closely monitored since November 1977 when South Africa declared its exclusive economic zone (EEZ) under the United Nations Law of the Sea. Having gained sovereignty over its fisheries resources, South Africa immediately began implementing regulatory and conservation measures, working with the trawling industry to rehabilitate the hake stocks that had been devastated by international fishing fleets. Today, the setting of an annual total allowable catch (TAC) remains the primary management measure for regulating the hake fisheries. However, a comprehensive suite of additional measures has been developed and implemented over time to address mainly socio-economic and ecosystem concerns. These measures are as follows:

- Restrictions on vessel power and size were introduced to the inshore trawl fishery in 2003.
- Capacity management measures were introduced to the offshore demersal trawl fishery in 2008. Capacity-limitation models were developed by SADSTIA in partnership with the Department of Environmental Affairs and Tourism (now the Department of Forestry, Fisheries and the Environment) with the goal of avoiding fleet overcapacity.
- Minimum mesh size regulations aimed at minimising the catch of juvenile fish were first implemented in 1974.
- Paired trawling was prohibited in 1977 in an effort to limit the impacts of fishing on the seabed.
- Restrictions on the lengths and hook spacing of longlines were introduced in 1994.
- Limits on the size and weight of bobbins and foot ropes were introduced in 2003, again in an effort to reduce the impacts of fishing on seabed habitats.
- Marine protected areas (closed to all forms of fishing) have been introduced for a number of reasons and some impact on deep-sea trawling. For example, a specific time/area closure is aimed at protecting kingklip spawning grounds.
- Ring-fencing is a voluntary measure adopted by the hake trawl industry in 2008 to prevent the spatial expansion of trawling operations beyond areas that had already been impacted during the development of the fishery, to prevent further impact on the benthic habitat. The ring-fenced area is monitored by vessel monitoring systems (VMS) and compliance is good.
- Mitigation of seabird mortalities includes vessel-specific offal management measures, the mandatory deployment of bird-scaring devices (tori lines) and regulations regarding the greasing of trawl warps.
- Bycatch limitation measures have been introduced and include precautionary upper catch limits, "move-on" rules and restrictions on the proportions of bycatch species per landing.

Enforcement of regulations and permit conditions include monitoring of all landings, imposition of fines in the case of minor offences, or full legal action under Section 28 of the South African Marine Living Resources Act that could result in the loss of rights in the event of successful prosecution.

== Threats to sustainability ==
The awarding of three prospecting licenses for the mining of marine phosphates from the seabed off the coast of South Africa is of serious concern to SADSTIA and its members. The prospecting license areas and proposed drill sites coincide with much of the footprint of the offshore demersal trawl fishery. As a result of the threat posed by bulk marine sediment mining, SADSTIA has joined the Safeguard our Seabed Coalition which is lobbying the South African government for a moratorium on marine phosphate mining in South Africa.
