= Processa edulis =

Scientific classification
- Kingdom: Animalia
- Phylum: Arthropoda
- Class: Malacostraca
- Order: Decapoda
- Suborder: Pleocyemata
- Infraorder: Caridea
- Family: Processidae
- Genus: Processa
- Species: P. edulis

Binomial name
- Processa edulis (Risso, 1816)

Synonyms
- Cancer pellucidus Nardo, 1847; Nika edulis Risso, 1816; Nikoides pontica Sowinsky, 1882; Processa pontica (Sowinsky, 1882)

Species of crustacean (caridean shrimp)

Processa edulis is a species of caridean shrimp found in shallow water in the Atlantic Ocean and the Mediterranean Sea. It mostly inhabits seagrass beds and eelgrass flats, hiding by day and feeding at night. A common name for it is nika shrimp.

== Description ==
Processa edulis is a moderate-sized shrimp, males being 12 to 34 mm (0.47 to 1.34 in) in length and females 25 to 52 mm (0.98 to 2.05 in). The rostrum is short, not extending beyond the eyes, and is tipped with a tooth and a point. The first two pairs of legs are asymmetrical; leg 1 has a claw on the left side and a clamp on the right; leg 2 has a clamp on both sides, but the left leg is longer than the right. During the day this shrimp is white but at night it becomes pink or red, with a scattering of tiny white spots, which are the chromatophores. The main pigments that result in this red colouring are astaxanthin and derived esters.

== Distribution and habitat ==
Processa edulis occurs in the eastern Atlantic Ocean between 55° and 33° North, the North Sea, the English Channel, the Mediterranean Sea and the Black Sea. It is a shallow water species, being found on soft bottoms in seagrass beds and among eelgrass. It is common in Posidonia beds in the English Channel, and is sometimes found among seaweeds growing on the sandy seabed. It hides among the foliage or buries itself in the sand by day, emerging at night to feed.

== Ecology ==
Processa edulis feeds on small invertebrates such as nematodes, polychaete worms, amphipods, isopods, ostracods, decapod larvae, foraminifera, molluscs and fish eggs, and occasionally diatoms and fragments of seagrass and seaweed. An analysis of the stomach content of specimen procured from the sea near the Ebro Delta showed a negligible amount of plant matter, leading to the hypothesis that Processa edulis is exclusively carnivorous, and the plants were only ingested by accident. It tears up its prey with its asymmetric front legs. Although this shrimp is edible, it has been little studied, perhaps because it is only caught when trawling takes place at night.

This shrimp is believed to be a protandric hermaphrodite, starting life as a male and becoming female as it grows larger. This view is born out by the presence of large numbers of moderate-sized females that make their appearance in mid-July, much the same time as there is a sharp decline in the number of males. At any time of year, small females are very rare, and the few there are may in fact be undifferentiated juveniles, and large males are non-existent. Breeding takes place between March and September, during which time several batches of eggs are laid. The female attaches the eggs to her abdominal legs; they are green at first, becoming grey before hatching after three to four weeks. The development of the planktonic larvae takes a further three to four weeks before they settle on the seabed to undergo metamorphosis into juvenile shrimps.

== Laboratory studies on circadian rhythm ==
Its activity cycle has also been studied under laboratory conditions. While kept in constant darkness, Processa edulis maintained its circadian rhythm and emerged at the time of "expected night", with over half of the captured individuals remaining buried in the sand substrate during "expected day". When exposed to artificial light stimuli, the specimens exhibited a strong reaction that was synchronized in all individuals, which emerged from the sand after 15–20 min after the light was turned off.
