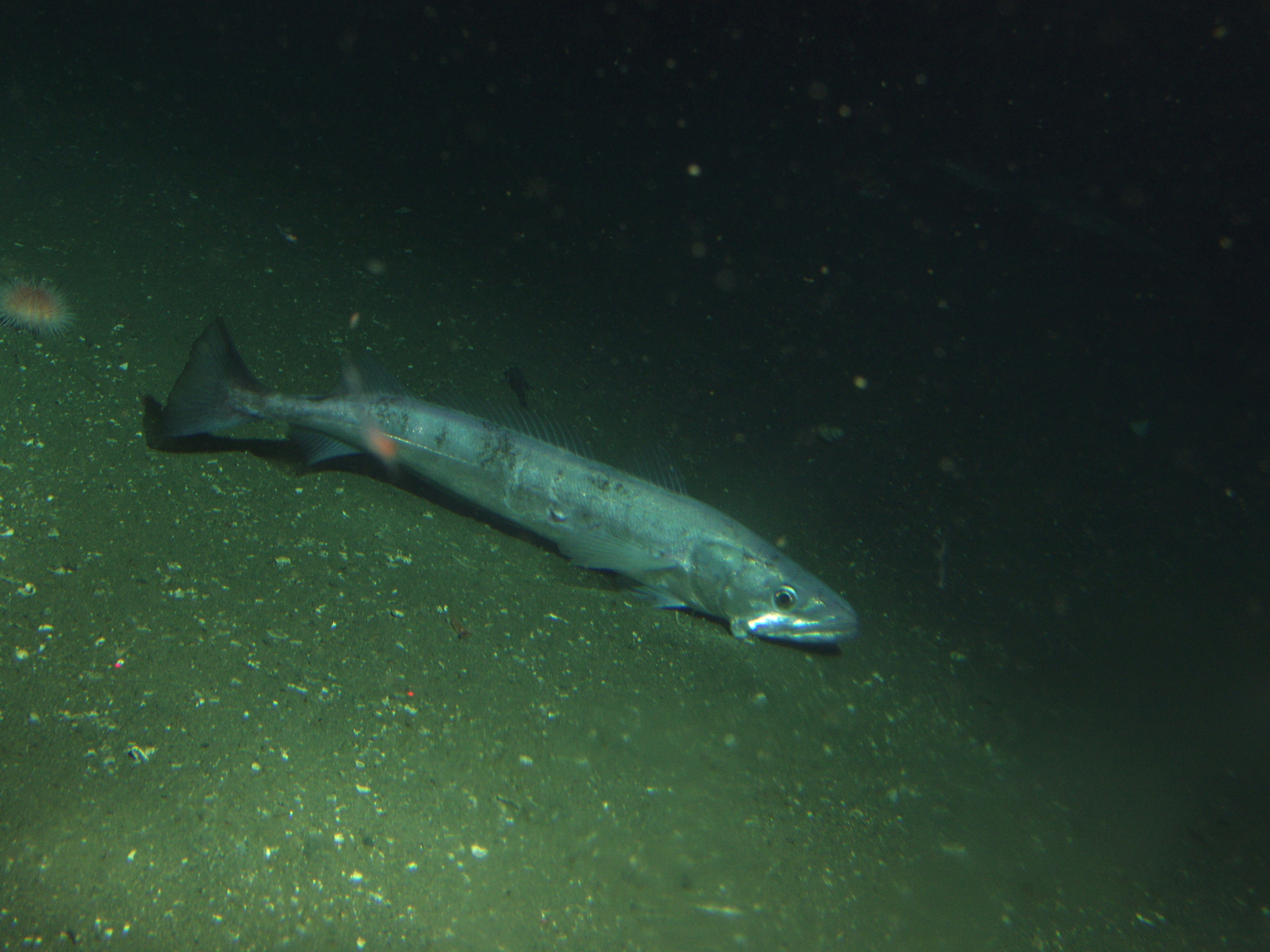
- Merluccius productus

Scientific classification
- Kingdom: Animalia
- Phylum: Chordata
- Class: Actinopterygii
- Order: Gadiformes
- Family: Merlucciidae
- Genus: Merluccius; Rafinesque, 1810

Type species
- Merluccius smiridus Rafinesque, 1810
- Distribution of American Merluccius spp.

Synonyms
- Epicopus Günther, 1860; Homalopomus Girard, 1856; Huttonichthys Whitley, 1937; Hydronus Minding, 1832; Merlangus Rafinesque, 1810; Merlucius Gronow, 1854; Merlus Guichenot, 1848; Onus Rafinesque, 1810; Polydatus Gistel, 1848; Stomodon Mitchill, 1814; Trachinoides Borodin, 1934

= Merluccius =

Genus of fishes

Merluccius is a genus of merluccid hakes from the Atlantic and Pacific Oceans, where mainly found relatively deep.

The generic name is derived from French mer ("sea") and Latin lucius, "pike."

== Species ==
The 13 recognized species in this genus are:

- Merluccius albidus (Mitchill, 1818) (offshore silver hake)
- Merluccius angustimanus Garman, 1899 (Panama hake)
- Merluccius australis (F. W. Hutton, 1872) (southern hake)
- Merluccius bilinearis (Mitchill, 1814) (silver hake)
- Merluccius capensis Castelnau, 1861 (shallow-water Cape hake)
- Merluccius gayi (Guichenot, 1848)
  - M. g. gayi (Guichenot, 1848) (South Pacific hake)
  - M. g. peruanus Ginsburg, 1954 (Peruvian hake)
- Merluccius hubbsi Marini, 1933 (Argentine hake)
- Merluccius merluccius (Linnaeus, 1758) (European hake)
- Merluccius paradoxus Franca, 1960 (deep-water cape hake)
- Merluccius patagonicus Lloris & Matallanas, 2003 (Patagonian hake)
- Merluccius polli Cadenat, 1950 (Benguela hake)
- Merluccius productus (Ayres, 1855) (North Pacific hake)
- Merluccius senegalensis Cadenat, 1950 (Senegalese hake)

Synonyms

- Merluccius hernandezi C. P. Mathews, 1985 (Cortez hake); valid as M. productus
- Merluccius tasmanicus Matallanas & Lloris, 2006; valid as M. australis
