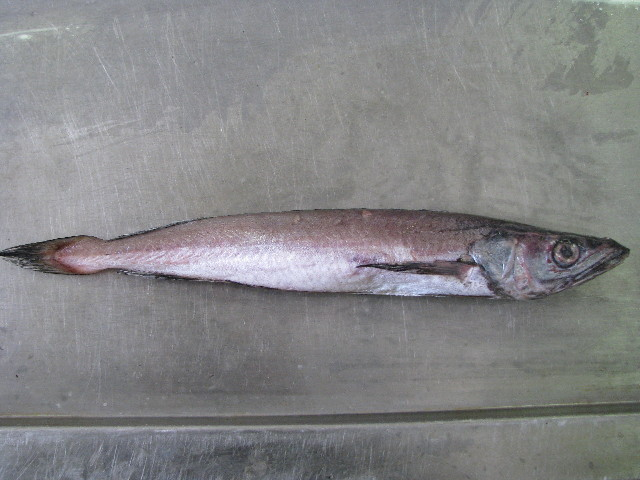

Conservation status
- Least Concern (IUCN 3.1)

Scientific classification
- Domain: Eukaryota
- Kingdom: Animalia
- Phylum: Chordata
- Class: Actinopterygii
- Order: Gadiformes
- Family: Merlucciidae
- Genus: Merluccius
- Species: M. capensis

Binomial name
- Merluccius capensis Castelnau, 1861

= Merluccius capensis =

Shallow-water Cape hake

Species of fish

Global capture production of Cape hakes (Merluccius capensis, M.paradoxus) in million tonnes from 1950 to 2022, as reported by the FAO

Merluccius capensis (shallow-water Cape hake or South African hake) is a ray-finned fish in the genus Merluccius, found in the south-eastern Atlantic Ocean, along the coast of South Africa. It is a long, lean fish with a large head, similar in appearance to the European hake and the deep-water Cape hake. By day, it lives close to the bottom on the continental shelf and upper slope at depths not usually exceeding 400 m (1,300 ft); it makes a large, daily vertical migration rising at night to feed in the nectonic zone, and it also migrates southwards in spring and northwards in autumn. It is an important commercial fish species in southern Africa.

== Description ==
Very similar to Merluccius merluccius (European hake) and Merluccius paradoxus (the deep-water Cape hake), M. capensis has an average length around 50 cm, up to a maximum around 120 cm (47 in). It is a long, lean fish with a large head, light brown above and white or silvery below. The first dorsal fin has a single spine and 9 to 11 soft rays, while the second has 38 to 43 soft rays. The anal fin has no spines and 37 to 41 soft rays. The caudal fin has a flat end or is slightly concave.

== Distribution ==
Its range extends southwards around the coast and into the Indian Ocean. On the east coast, it is less abundant and is rarely found in significant numbers north of KwaZulu-Natal. On the west coast, M. capensis occurs as far north as Benguela in Angola, where its distribution overlaps that of Merluccius polli, the Benguela hake. It lives close to the bottom on the continental shelf and upper slope at depths from 50 to 500 m, usually not below 400 m. Its preferred depth partly overlaps that of Merluccius paradoxus between depths of 200 and 400 m.

In South Africa, M. capensis is one of the most important commercial food fishes. Caught via demersal trawling, the associated industry is represented by the South Africa Deep Sea Trawling Industries Association (SADSTIA). It is known locally (from the Afrikaans stokvis) as stockfish, not to be confused with the dried cod usually known by that name.

== Ecology ==
The shallow-water Cape hake might be classified as a euryphagous carnivore; immature specimens feed on small, deep-sea fishes and crustaceans. Large hake feed on squid and fishes, as well; smaller hake and jack mackerel are major components of their diet.

The shallow-water Cape hake migrates vertically, daily, being demersal by day and nektonic by night. On a seasonal basis, it migrates southwards in spring and northwards in autumn. Spawning is variably reported either to be year-round, or to occur mainly from mid-spring to early summer.

The Cape hake is often fished together with the species Merluccius paradoxus, which generally lives at greater depths. Most reported catches combine both species, but the range of M. capensis continues towards the north-west coast of southern Africa, in the region of Angola, where, for practical purposes, M. paradoxus does not occur.
