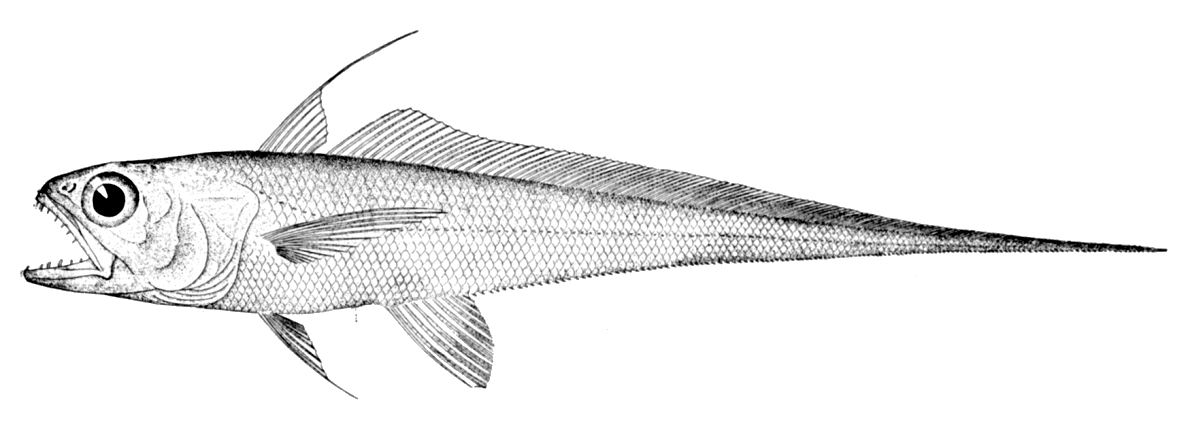

Conservation status
- Least Concern (IUCN 3.1)

Scientific classification
- Kingdom: Animalia
- Phylum: Chordata
- Class: Actinopterygii
- Order: Gadiformes
- Suborder: Macrouroidei
- Family: Steindachneriidae; Parr, 1942
- Genus: Steindachneria; Goode & Bean, 1888
- Species: S. argentea

Binomial name
- Steindachneria argentea Goode & T. H. Bean, 1896

= Luminous hake =

Luminous hake Temporal range: Late Oligocene–present

Species of fish

The luminous hake (Steindachneria argentea) is a West Atlantic member of the gadiform fishes. It is the only extant member of its genus, and of the family Steindachneriidae. It was formerly placed in the Merlucciidae.

== Evolution ==
Steindachneria argentea is the only extant species within its genus and family. However, a fossil skeleton of a close relative, †Parasteindachneria Swidnicki, 1990 has been recovered from the Late Oligocene-aged Menilite Formation of Poland. In addition, two fossil species of Steindachneria are known exclusively from otoliths: †S. goederti Nolf, 2002 from the Early Miocene of Chile (Navidad and Lacui Formations) and Washington, US (Astoria Formation), and S. svennielseni Nolf, 2002 from the Early Miocene of Chile (Navidad, Lacui, and Ranquil Formations) and potentially Venezuela (Cantare Formation).

S. svennielseni is notable for the extremely high number of fossil otoliths known from Chile, forming a growth series spanning juvenile to adult individuals. Allometry based on these otoliths suggest extreme morphological changes as the fish grew, to an extent not observed in any other fossil fish taxa known from otoliths.

== Characteristics ==
Luminous hake grow to a maximum of 30 cm (12 in) in total length. They have a silver colored body with slight brown coloring in dorsal areas, a purple tint ventrally, and a dark oral cavity. They have big eyes on a large head and a tapering body that ends in a point since they have no caudal fin. Their luminosity comes from a characteristic striated light organ on the sides of the head and lower (ventral) half of the body. The anus is found between the pelvic fins and is widely separated from the urogenital opening located anterior to the anal fin.

Luminous hake have uninterrupted lateral lines. They have a combined total of 18–20 gill rakers with five on the upper limb and 13–15 on the lower limb. The front of the first of two dorsal fins is the location of its one spine. The one anal fin is made up of a total of 123–125 soft rays. They possess paired pectoral and pelvic fins. The pectoral fins have 14–17 soft rays. The pelvic fins are located in the thoracic region.

== Distribution ==
Luminous hake are common in deep water but can be found on the outer shelf and on soft muddy bottoms of the Western Atlantic, Florida, northern Gulf of Mexico through Central America to Venezuela. The luminous hake occur at a depth range of 400–500 metres (1,300–1,600 ft).

== Other information ==
- This species is of no interest by fisheries.
- Merluccius albidus is a predator of luminous hake.
