= Merluccius tasmanicus =

Scientific classification
- Kingdom: Animalia
- Phylum: Chordata
- Class: Actinopterygii
- Order: Gadiformes
- Family: Merlucciidae
- Genus: Merluccius
- Species: M. tasmanicus

Binomial name
- Merluccius tasmanicus Matallanas & Lloris, 2006

Species of fish

Merluccius tasmanicus is a species of fish from the family Merlucciidae from the western Pacific and south-eastern Pacific and south-western Atlantic which was described in 2006. It is however considered to be synonymous with Merluccius australis by some authorities.
