= Merluccius patagonicus =

Scientific classification
- Kingdom: Animalia
- Phylum: Chordata
- Class: Actinopterygii
- Order: Gadiformes
- Family: Merlucciidae
- Genus: Merluccius
- Species: M. patagonicus

Binomial name
- Merluccius patagonicus Lloris & Matallanas, 2003

Species of fish

Merluccius patagonicus, the Patagonian hake, is a species of fish from the family Merlucciidae from the western South Atlantic which was described in 2003. However some authorities consider the distinguishing features of M. patagonicus to be within the range of variability for M. hubbsi and that M. patagonicus is therefore a synonym of M. hubbsi.

Males have a maximum recorded length of 56.2 cm (22.1 in) while females are known to grow up to a maximum length of 71 cm (28 in). This species lives to a maximum depth of 95 metres (312 feet).
