= Forkbeard =

Forkbeard may refer to:

- Swein Forkbeard, died 1014, King of Denmark and briefly King of England
- Phycis phycis, a fish called the forkbeard
