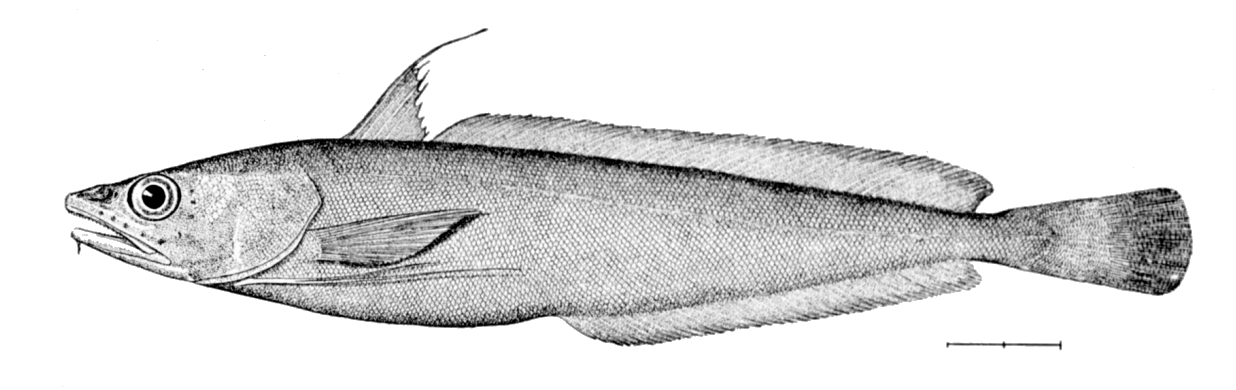

Scientific classification
- Domain: Eukaryota
- Kingdom: Animalia
- Phylum: Chordata
- Class: Actinopterygii
- Order: Gadiformes
- Family: Phycidae
- Genus: Urophycis
- Species: U. tenuis

Binomial name
- Urophycis tenuis (Mitchill, 1814)

Synonyms
- Gadus tenuis Mitchill, 1814; Phycis tenuis (Mitchill, 1814); Phycis furcatus Fleming, 1828; Phycis dekayi Kaup, 1858; Phycis borealis Saemundsson, 1913

= White hake =

Species of fish

The white hake or mud hake (Urophycis tenuis) is a phycid hake. It is found in the deeper waters in the northwest Atlantic Ocean.

== Description ==
The species can grow to be up to 30 cm by the end of the first year, and 400 mm if male and 480 mm if female by the first reproduction. It grows to a maximum length of 1.35 m (4.4 ft).

== Distribution and habitat ==
The white hake is found in the northwest Atlantic from North Carolina to Newfoundland, at depths of about 180–1,000 m (590–3,280 ft).

== Reproduction and development ==
Spawning season for the white hake starts in late winter or early spring. It has been difficult to study the breeding habits of the white hake due to researchers’ issue with finding ripe females. Studies have found that larvae for the species occur in warm Slope Sea waters, but further along in development, the species can be found in continental shelf waters.
