= Nikoides danae =

Scientific classification
- Domain: Eukaryota
- Kingdom: Animalia
- Phylum: Arthropoda
- Class: Malacostraca
- Order: Decapoda
- Suborder: Pleocyemata
- Infraorder: Caridea
- Family: Processidae
- Genus: Nikoides
- Species: N. danae

Binomial name
- Nikoides danae Paulson, 1875

Species of crustacean

Nikoides danae is a species of crustacean in the family Processidae, first described in 1875 by Otton Mikhailovich Paulson.

It is a bottom dwelling species found at depths of 0-5 m, in shallow waters of the Central Pacific, off New Caledonia and French Polynesia.
