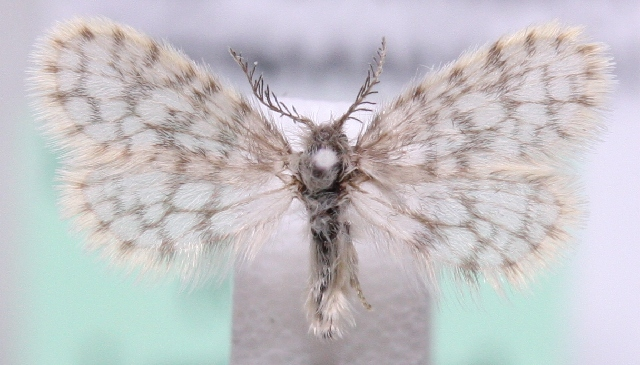

Scientific classification
- Kingdom: Animalia
- Phylum: Chordata
- Class: Actinopterygii
- Order: Gadiformes
- Family: Phycidae
- Genus: Whittleia
- Species: W. retiella

Binomial name
- Whittleia retiella (Newman, 1847)

Synonyms
- Psyche retiella Newman, 1847; Whittleia cimbriella Rebel, 1938

= Whittleia retiella =

Species of moth

Whittleia retiella is a moth of the Psychidae family. It is found in Great Britain, the Netherlands, France, Germany, Denmark and Sweden.

The wingspan is 13–17 mm. Adult males are on wing from April to May. Females are wingless.

The larvae feed on Puccinellia maritima, Artemisia and Atriplex species.

== Subspecies ==
- Whittleia retiella retiella
- Whittleia retiella cimbriella Rebel, 1938
