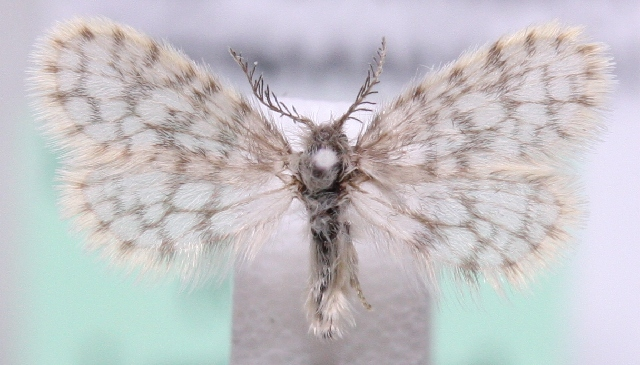
- Whittleia retiella

Scientific classification
- Domain: Eukaryota
- Kingdom: Animalia
- Phylum: Chordata
- Class: Actinopterygii
- Order: Gadiformes
- Family: Phycidae
- Genus: Whittleia; Tutt, 1900

= Whittleia =

Genus of moths

Whittleia is a genus of moths of the Psychidae family.

== Species ==
- Whittleia retiella (Newman, 1847)
- Whittleia schwingenschussi Rebel, 1910
- Whittleia undulella (Fischer v. Röslerstamm, 1837)
