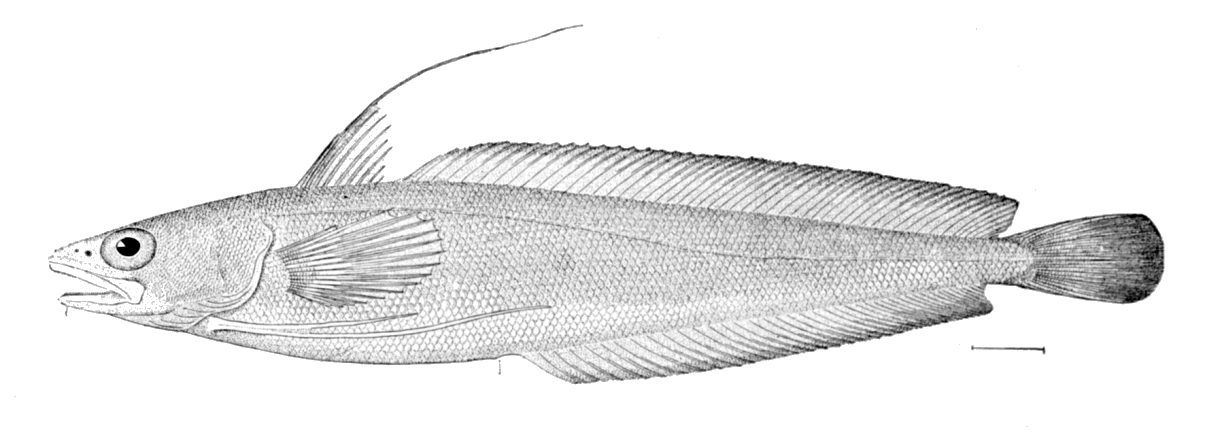

Scientific classification
- Domain: Eukaryota
- Kingdom: Animalia
- Phylum: Chordata
- Class: Actinopterygii
- Order: Gadiformes
- Family: Phycidae
- Genus: Urophycis
- Species: U. chuss

Binomial name
- Urophycis chuss (Walbaum, 1792)

Synonyms
- Blennius chuss Walbaum, 1792; Phycis chuss (Walbaum, 1792); Enchelyopus americanus Bloch & Schneider, 1801; Phycis americanus (Bloch & Schneider, 1801); Gadus longipes Mitchill, 1814; Phycis marginatus Rafinesque, 1818; Phycis filamentosus Storer, 1858

= Red hake =

Species of fish

The red hake or squirrel hake fish, Urophycis chuss, is a species of phycid hake. It is found in the Atlantic Ocean at depths between 10 and 500 m. It grows to about 30 in (75 cm) and 7 lb (3.2 kg). Red hake are edible, and are sought out by recreational fisherman as a gamefish.

== About ==
Red hake are distributed from the Gulf of St. Lawrence to North Carolina. They are most abundant from the western Gulf of Maine to southern New England. Red hake prefer water temperatures between 5 and 12 °C, causing them to migrate seasonally. Throughout the spring and summer, they migrate into more shallow waters to spawn. During winter, they tend to move to deeper waters offshore in the Gulf of Maine and along southern New England and Georges Bank all the way to wrecks off the coast of New Jersey. Red hake spawn from May until November.

== Appearance ==
Depending on the environment, red hake vary in color. Most tend to be a reddish brown to olive-brown color on their sides with pale tan spots. Underneath, they vary in shades of white. Red hake have a barbel on their chin as they are a member of the hake family. Their dorsal fin is triangular, but their second dorsal and anal fins are long, continuous, and do not attach to the tail fin, much like an eel. The head is small, but has a large mouth with many small teeth.

== Sources ==
- Froese, Rainer; Pauly, Daniel (eds.). "Urophycis chuss". FishBase. April 2006 version.
