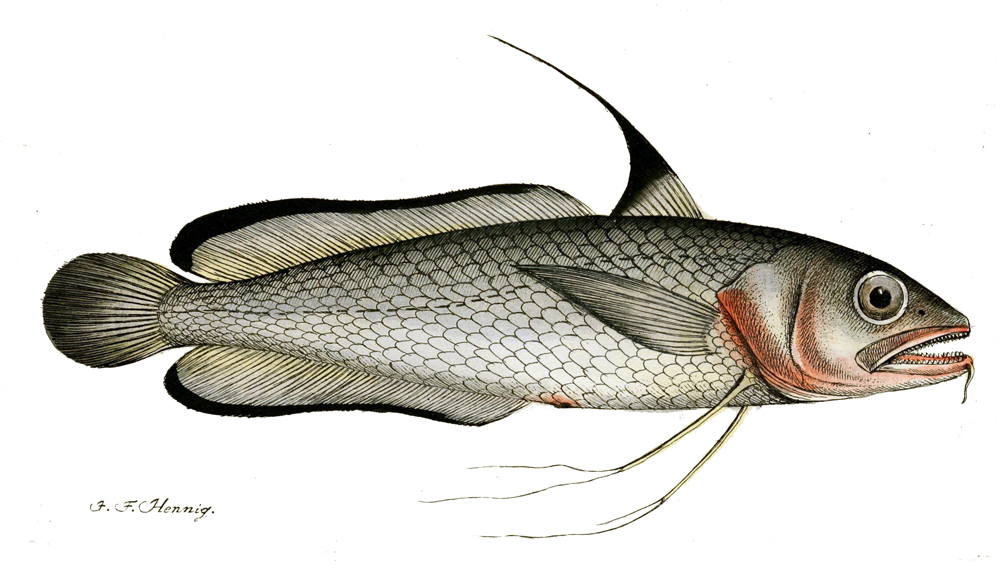

Scientific classification
- Domain: Eukaryota
- Kingdom: Animalia
- Phylum: Chordata
- Class: Actinopterygii
- Order: Gadiformes
- Family: Phycidae
- Genus: Phycis
- Species: P. blennoides

Binomial name
- Phycis blennoides (Brünnich, 1768)

= Phycis blennoides =

Species of fish

Phycis blennoides, the greater forkbeard, is a species of fish belonging to the family Phycidae.

It is native to Europe, Northern Africa, Northern America.
