= Rhinocephalus =

Scientific classification
- Kingdom: Animalia
- Phylum: Chordata
- Class: Actinopterygii
- Division: Teleostei
- Order: Gadiformes
- Family: Merlucciidae
- Genus: †Rhinocephalus; Casier, 1966

Extinct genus of fishes

Rhinocephalus is an extinct genus of prehistoric bony fish.

== See also ==
- Prehistoric fish
- List of prehistoric bony fish
