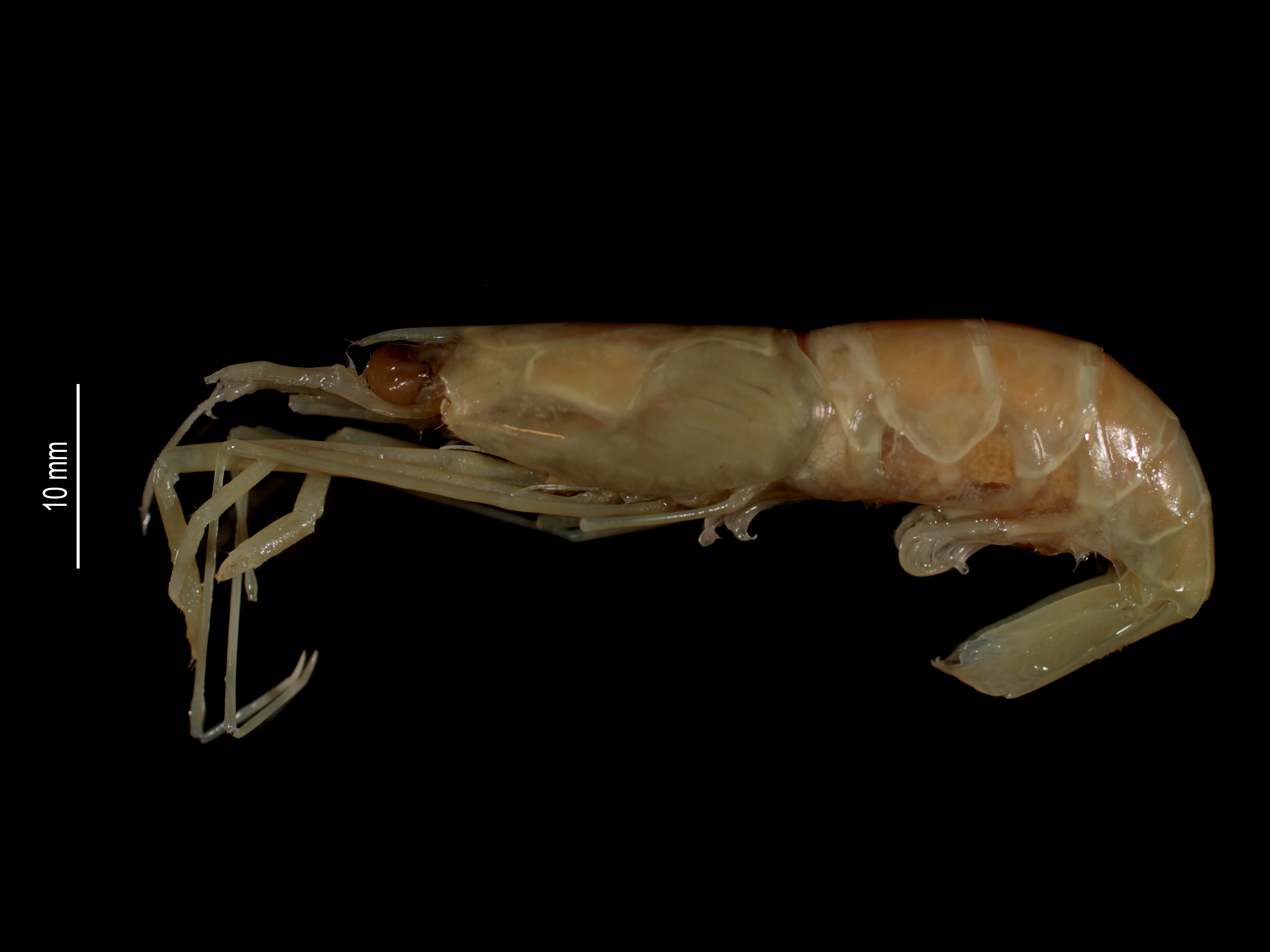
- Nikoides longicarpus

Scientific classification
- Domain: Eukaryota
- Kingdom: Animalia
- Phylum: Arthropoda
- Class: Malacostraca
- Order: Decapoda
- Suborder: Pleocyemata
- Infraorder: Caridea
- Family: Processidae
- Genus: Nikoides; Paul'son, 1875

= Nikoides =

Family of crustaceans

The Nikoides are a genus in the Processidae family of shrimp, first described in 1875 by Otton Mikhailovich Paulson.

In Australia it is found off the northern coasts of Western Australia, the Northern Territory, and Queensland.

Species accepted by WoRMS are:

- Nikoides boraboraensis Burukovsky, 2002
- Nikoides danae Paulson, 1875
- Nikoides gurneyi Hayashi, 1975
- Nikoides longicarpus Noël, 1986
- Nikoides maldivensis Borradaile, 1915
- Nikoides multispinatus Hayashi, 1981
- Nikoides plantei Burukovsky, 2007
- Nikoides schmitti Manning & Chace, 1971
- Nikoides sibogae De Man, 1918
- Nikoides steinii (Edmondson, 1935)
- Nikoides subdistalis Komai & Hirabayashi, 2021
