= Lyconus =

Scientific classification
- Kingdom: Animalia
- Phylum: Chordata
- Class: Actinopterygii
- Division: Teleostei
- Order: Gadiformes
- Suborder: Macrouroidei
- Family: Lyconidae; Günther, 1887
- Genus: Lyconus; Günther, 1887

Type species
- Lyconus pinnatus Günther, 1887

Genus of fishes

Lyconus is a genus of gadiform fish known only from the Atlantic Ocean. It is the only genus in the family Lyconidae. It was formerly placed in the Merlucciidae.

== Species ==
The currently recognized species in this genus are:

- Lyconus brachycolus Holt & Byrne, 1906
- Lyconus pinnatus Günther, 1887
