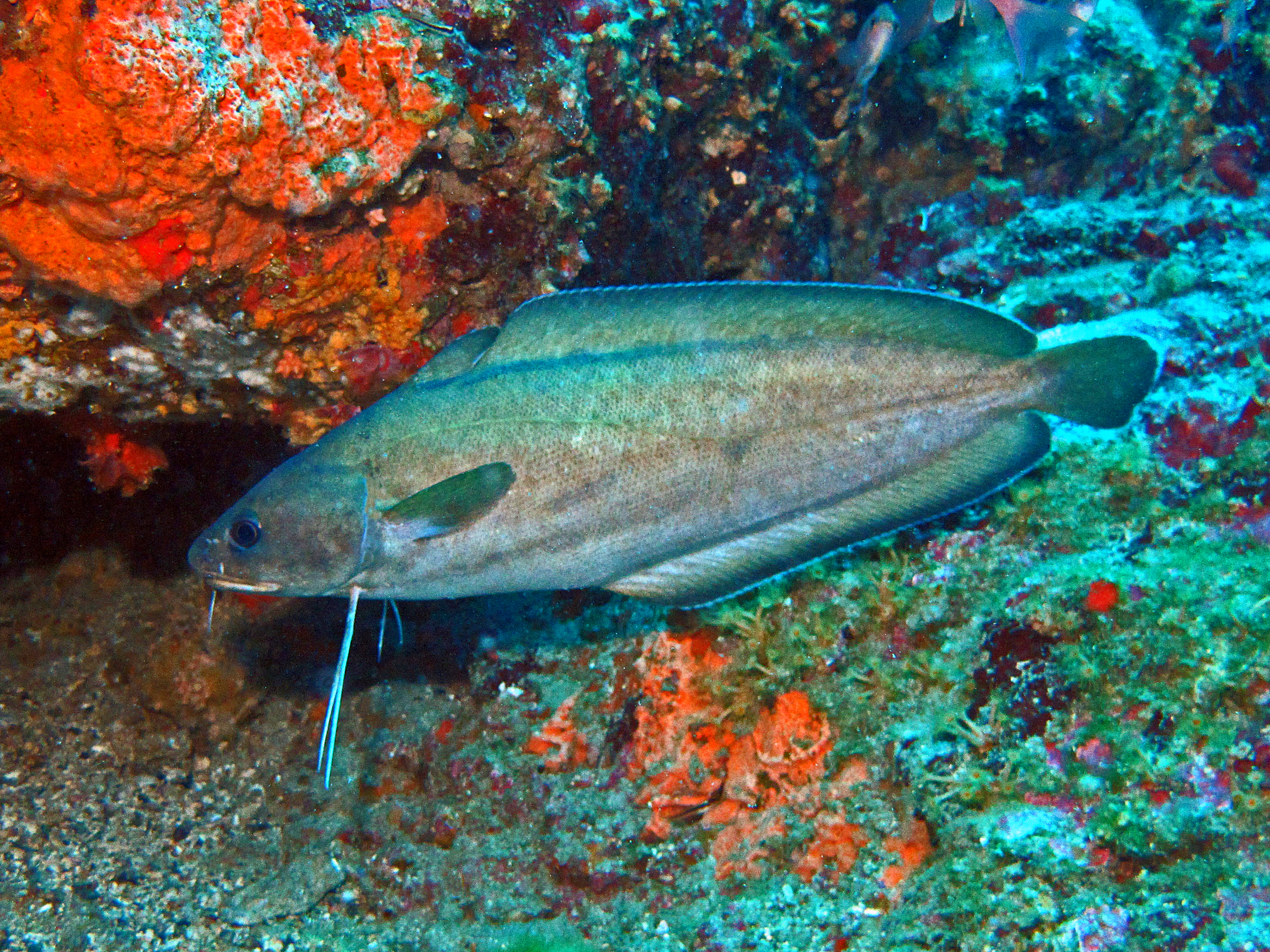

Conservation status
- Least Concern (IUCN 3.1)

Scientific classification
- Kingdom: Animalia
- Phylum: Chordata
- Class: Actinopterygii
- Order: Gadiformes
- Family: Phycidae
- Genus: Phycis
- Species: P. phycis

Binomial name
- Phycis phycis (Linnaeus, 1766)

Synonyms
- Blennius phycis Linnaeus, 1766; Phycis furcatus (Bowdich, 1825); Phycis limbatus (Valenciennes, 1838); Phycis mediterraneus (Delaroche, 1809); Tinca marina (Walbaum, 1792)

= Phycis phycis =

Forkbeard

Species of fish

Phycis phycis, the forkbeard, is a species of phycid hakes in the family Phycidae.

== Etymology ==
Genus and species names Phycis derive from Greek, phykon meaning seaweed, as these fishes usually live hidden among seaweeds.

== Description ==
Phycis phycis commonly can reach a length of 25 centimetres (9.8 in), with a maximum length of 65 centimetres (26 in) in males.

These fishes have a wide mouth with thick lips. A barbel is present on the chin. They do not have any thorn in the fins, but show elongated pelvic-fin rays reduced to bifid filaments, with 2 soft rays. The dorsal fin is a double and rounded (the first can have 9 or 11 soft rays, the second 56 or 65). The caudal fin is rounded, with 27 or 29 soft rays. Vertical fins distally reaching the origin of the anal fin. They are dark, sometimes with a pale margin. Body color is dark brown or gray on the back, but ventrally the color becomes paler.

== Biology ==
Forkbeards are nocturnal; during the daytime, they tend to hide between rocks. These forkbeards feed on small fish and several species of invertebrates. Breeding takes place from January to May. Scientists consider forkbeards to be comparatively slow-growing fishes enjoying long lifespans.

== Distribution and habitat ==
This species is present in the Mediterranean, in Portugal and in western coast of northern Africa and the Azores. These fishes live on hard and sandy-muddy bottoms close to the rocks usually, at depths of 100–650 m.
