= Lyconodes =

Scientific classification
- Kingdom: Animalia
- Phylum: Chordata
- Class: Actinopterygii
- Division: Teleostei
- Order: Gadiformes
- Family: Merlucciidae
- Genus: Lyconodes; Gilchrist, 1922
- Species: L. argenteus

Binomial name
- Lyconodes argenteus Gilchrist, 1922

Species of fish

Lyconodes argenteus is a species of merluccid hake so far known only from the southeast Atlantic Ocean near to South Africa. This species grows to 4.5 cm (1.8 in) in total length.
