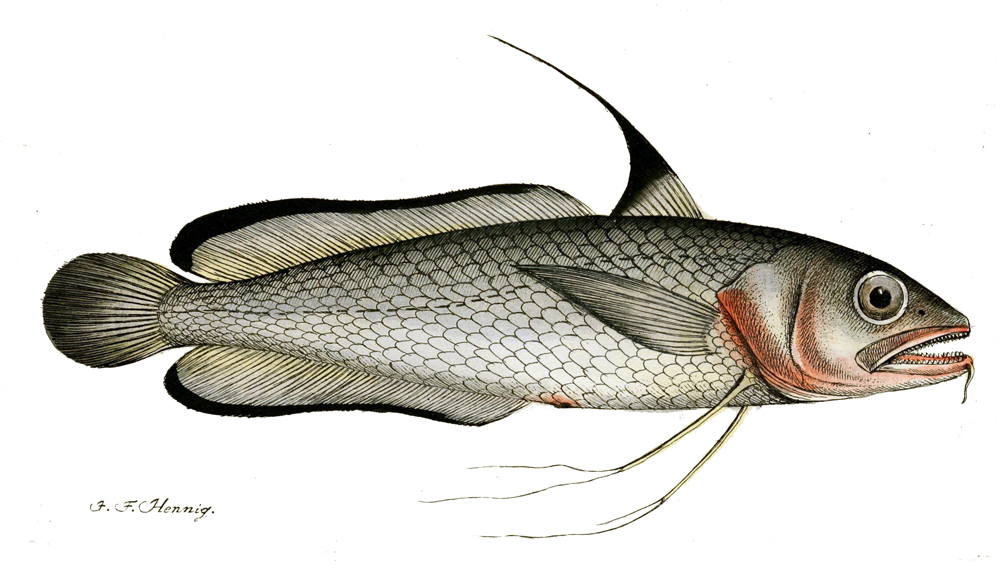
- Greater forkbeard (P. blennoides)
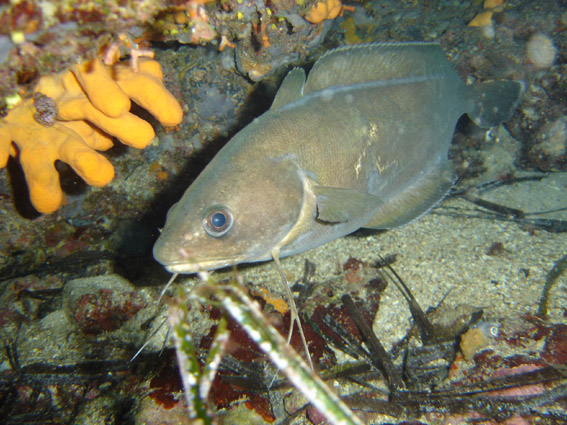
- Forkbeard (P. phycis)

Scientific classification
- Domain: Eukaryota
- Kingdom: Animalia
- Phylum: Chordata
- Class: Actinopterygii
- Order: Gadiformes
- Family: Phycidae
- Genus: Phycis; Walbaum, 1792

Type species
- Blennius phycis Linnaeus, 1766

= Phycis =

Genus of fishes

Phycis is a genus of phycid hakes from the North Atlantic, including the Mediterranean Sea.

== Species ==
There are currently three recognized species in this genus:

- Phycis blennoides (Brünnich, 1768) (Greater forkbeard)
- Phycis chesteri Goode & T. H. Bean, 1878 (Longfin hake)
- Phycis phycis (Linnaeus, 1766) (Forkbeard)
