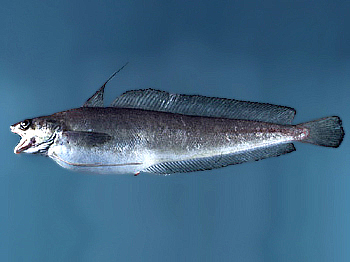
- Urophycis chuss

Scientific classification
- Kingdom: Animalia
- Phylum: Chordata
- Class: Actinopterygii
- Division: Teleostei
- Order: Gadiformes
- Family: Phycidae
- Genus: Urophycis; T. N. Gill, 1863

Type species
- Blennius regius Walbaum, 1792

Synonyms
- Emphycus Jordan & Evermann, 1898

= Urophycis =

Genus of fishes

Urophycis is a genus of phycid hakes.

== Species ==
There are currently 8 recognized species in this genus:

- Urophycis brasiliensis (Kaup, 1858) (Brazilian codling)
- Urophycis chuss (Walbaum, 1792) (Red hake)
- Urophycis cirrata (Goode & T. H. Bean, 1896) (Gulf hake)
- Urophycis earllii (T. H. Bean, 1880) (Carolina hake)
- Urophycis floridana (T. H. Bean & Dresel, 1884) (Southern codling)
- Urophycis mystacea A. Miranda-Ribeiro, 1903
- Urophycis regia (Walbaum, 1792) (Spotted codling)
- Urophycis tenuis (Mitchill, 1814) (White hake)
