= Tomás Leandro Marini =

Argentine ichthyologist (1902–1984)

- Born: February 27, 1902; Buenos Aires, Argentina
- Died: December 2, 1984 (aged 82); Buenos Aires, Argentina
- Scientific career
- Fields: Ichthyology

Tomás Leandro Marini (February 27, 1902 – December 2, 1984) was an Argentine ichthyologist.

== Work ==
Argentine hake (Merluccius hubbsi), 1933
