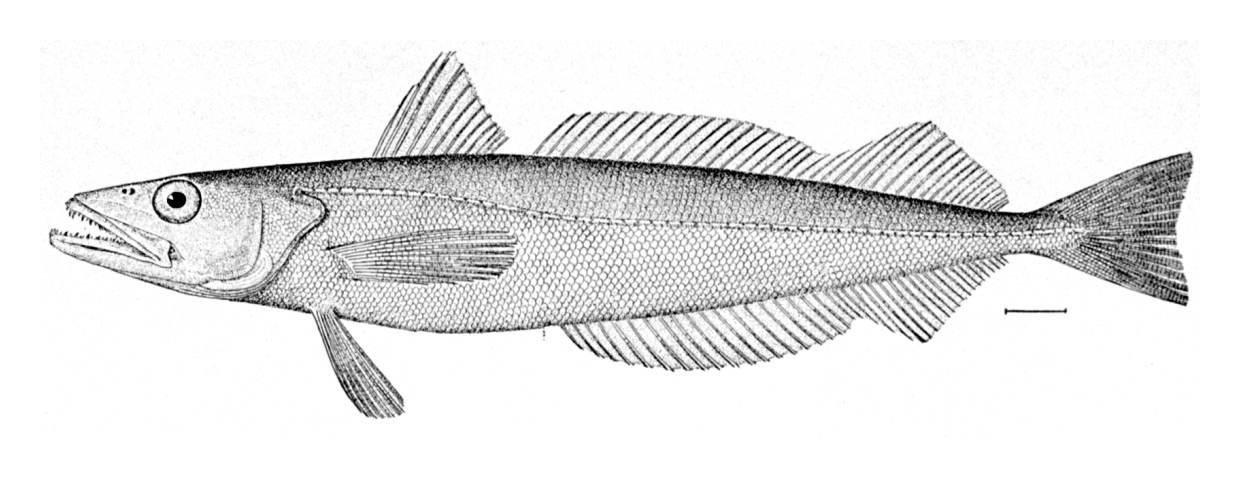

Conservation status
- Near Threatened (IUCN 3.1)

Scientific classification
- Kingdom: Animalia
- Phylum: Chordata
- Class: Actinopterygii
- Division: Teleostei
- Order: Gadiformes
- Family: Merlucciidae
- Genus: Merluccius
- Species: M. bilinearis

Binomial name
- Merluccius bilinearis (Mitchill, 1814)

Synonyms
- Stomodon bilinearis Mitchill, 1814

= Silver hake =

Species of fish

The silver hake, Atlantic hake, or New England hake (Merluccius bilinearis) is a merluccid hake of the genus Merluccius, found in the northwest Atlantic Ocean. It is highly predatory and typically feeds on fish and crustaceans.

== Appearance ==
The silver hake is a long, thin species with a protruding lower jaw and two dorsal fins. This hake is named as such for its silvery coloring, while darker dorsally. They typically grow to be about 37 cm (15 in), but can reach a maximum length of 76 cm (30 in).

== Occurrence ==
The silver hake typically inhabits relatively warm bottom waters, where temperatures are around 5–10 °C. The species is found in the northwest Atlantic Ocean at depths between 55 and 914 m (180 and 3,000 ft). It is found along the eastern coast of Canada and United States, as well as in the Bahamas, but it is most common between Newfoundland and South Carolina.
