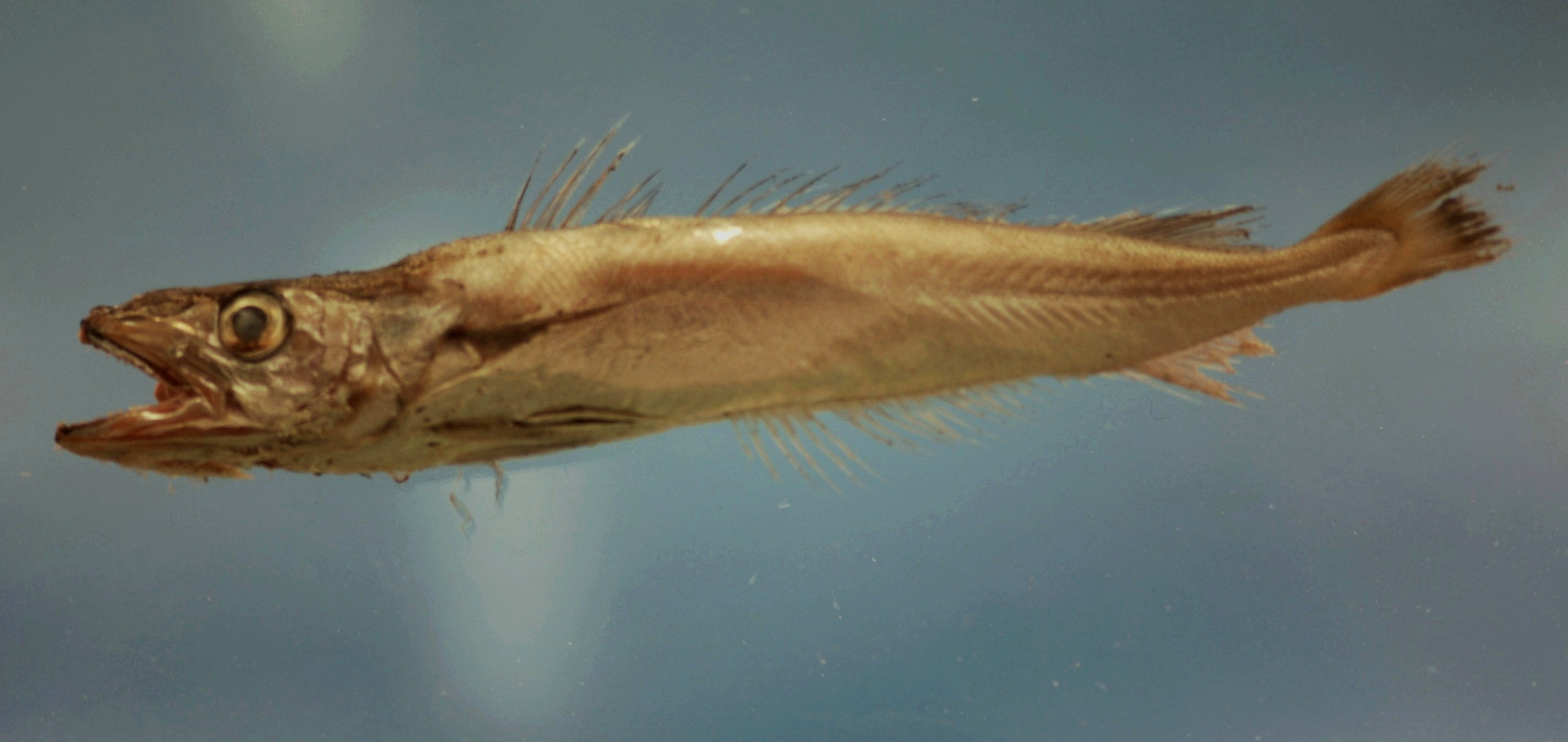

Conservation status
- Least Concern (IUCN 3.1)

Scientific classification
- Domain: Eukaryota
- Kingdom: Animalia
- Phylum: Chordata
- Class: Actinopterygii
- Order: Gadiformes
- Family: Merlucciidae
- Genus: Merluccius
- Species: M. albidus

Binomial name
- Merluccius albidus (Mitchill, 1818)

= Merluccius albidus =

Species of fish

Merluccius albidus, sometimes known as the offshore hake, offshore silver hake, or offshore whiting, is a species of fish in the family Merlucciidae. It is found on the outer (offshore) continental shelf at depths of 70–1,170 m (230–3,840 ft) in the west Atlantic, ranging from New England to French Guiana. It reaches 70 cm (28 in) in length and 4.1 kg (9.0 lb) in weight.
