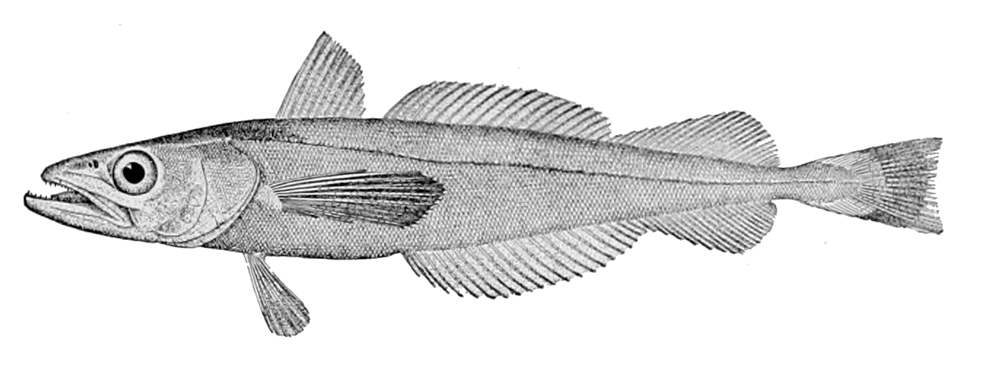

Conservation status
- Least Concern (IUCN 3.1)

Scientific classification
- Kingdom: Animalia
- Phylum: Chordata
- Class: Actinopterygii
- Division: Teleostei
- Order: Gadiformes
- Family: Merlucciidae
- Genus: Merluccius
- Species: M. productus

Binomial name
- Merluccius productus (Ayres, 1855)

Synonyms
- Merlangus productus Ayres, 1855; Homalopomus trowbridgii Girard, 1856

= North Pacific hake =

Species of fish

The North Pacific hake, Pacific hake, Pacific whiting, or jack salmon (Merluccius productus) is a ray-finned fish in the genus Merluccius, found in the northeast Pacific Ocean from northern Vancouver Island to the northern part of the Gulf of California. It is a silver-gray fish with black speckling, growing to a length of 90 cm (3 ft). It is a migratory offshore fish and undergoes a daily vertical migration from the surface to the seabed at depths down to about 1,000 m (3,300 ft).

It is the target of an important commercial fishery off the West Coast of the United States, and annual quotas are used to prevent overfishing. Pacific Hake (whiting) contains an enzyme in its tissues that can rapidly spoil the fish in under 12 hours, causing the tissues to disintegrate. Fisheries that target Pacific Hake typically deliver the fish to processing plants within several hours of being caught. At the processing plants, an enzyme inhibitor is added to the raw fish to slow spoilage and neutralize the specific enzyme responsible for rapid deterioration. Almost all Pacific Hake that is wild caught is converted into fish paste and processed into surimi which allows the enzyme inhibitor to be mixed into the fish paste to make crab sticks and other processed fish products. Over 70% of the Pacific Hake caught and processed into surimi is shipped to Japan and Korea.

== Description ==
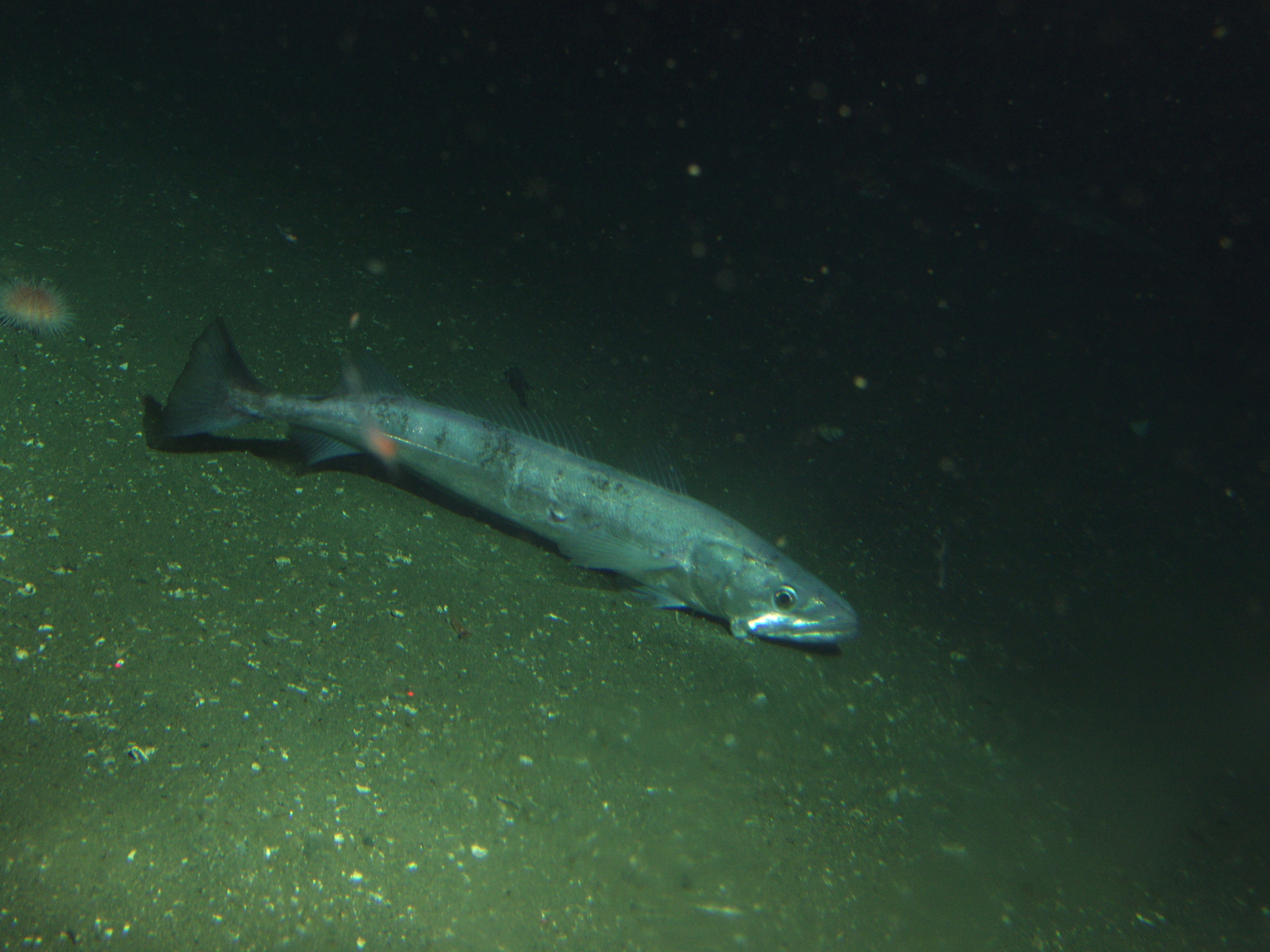
M. productus California, Cordell Bank National Marine Sanctuary

Its length is about 3 ft (90 cm), and it can live up to 20 years. Its coloration is metallic silver-gray with black speckling and pure silvery white on the belly. The North Pacific hake has two dorsal fins and a truncated caudal fin. Its pectoral fin tips usually reach to or beyond the origin of its anal fin. The caudal fin is always concave.

== Reproduction ==
North Pacific hake spawn from January to June. They may spawn more than once per season, so absolute fecundity is difficult to determine. Historically, inshore female Pacific hake matured at 15 in (37 cm) and 4–5 years of age. Currently, length at 50% maturity for females in the Port Susan North Pacific hake population is about 8.5 in (21.5 cm), compared to 11.7 in (29.8 cm) in the 1980s. Females mature at 3–4 years of age and 13.4 to 15.7 in (34–40 cm), and nearly all males are mature by age three and as small as 11 in (28 cm).

== Ecology ==
They occur from the surface to depths of 1,000 m (3,300 ft). North Pacific hake are nocturnal feeders that undergo daily vertical migrations off the bottom to feed on a variety of fishes and invertebrates. Their diet includes shrimp, plankton, and smaller fish such as lanternfish. They are an important prey item for sea lions, small cetaceans, and dogfish sharks.

The three recognized stocks of Pacific hake are a highly migratory offshore (or coastal) stock that ranges from southern California to Queen Charlotte Sound, a central-south Puget Sound stock, and a Strait of Georgia stock. The offshore North Pacific hake stock spawned off south-central California to Baja California in January and February during the 1960s, 1970s, and 1980s. In spring and summer, adults migrated northward to feed to as far as central Vancouver Island (and as far as Queen Charlotte Sound in some years). In the fall, adults migrated southward toward spawning grounds. Since the early 1990s, a portion of the offshore stock has remained off the west coast of Canada year-round, and some Pacific Hake have been observed spawning off the west coast of Vancouver Island. Resident Pacific hake in Puget Sound spawn in Port Susan and Dabob Bay from February through April. The Strait of Georgia resident stock aggregates to spawn in the deep basins of the south-central strait, where peak spawning occurs from March to May.

== Fisheries and conservation ==
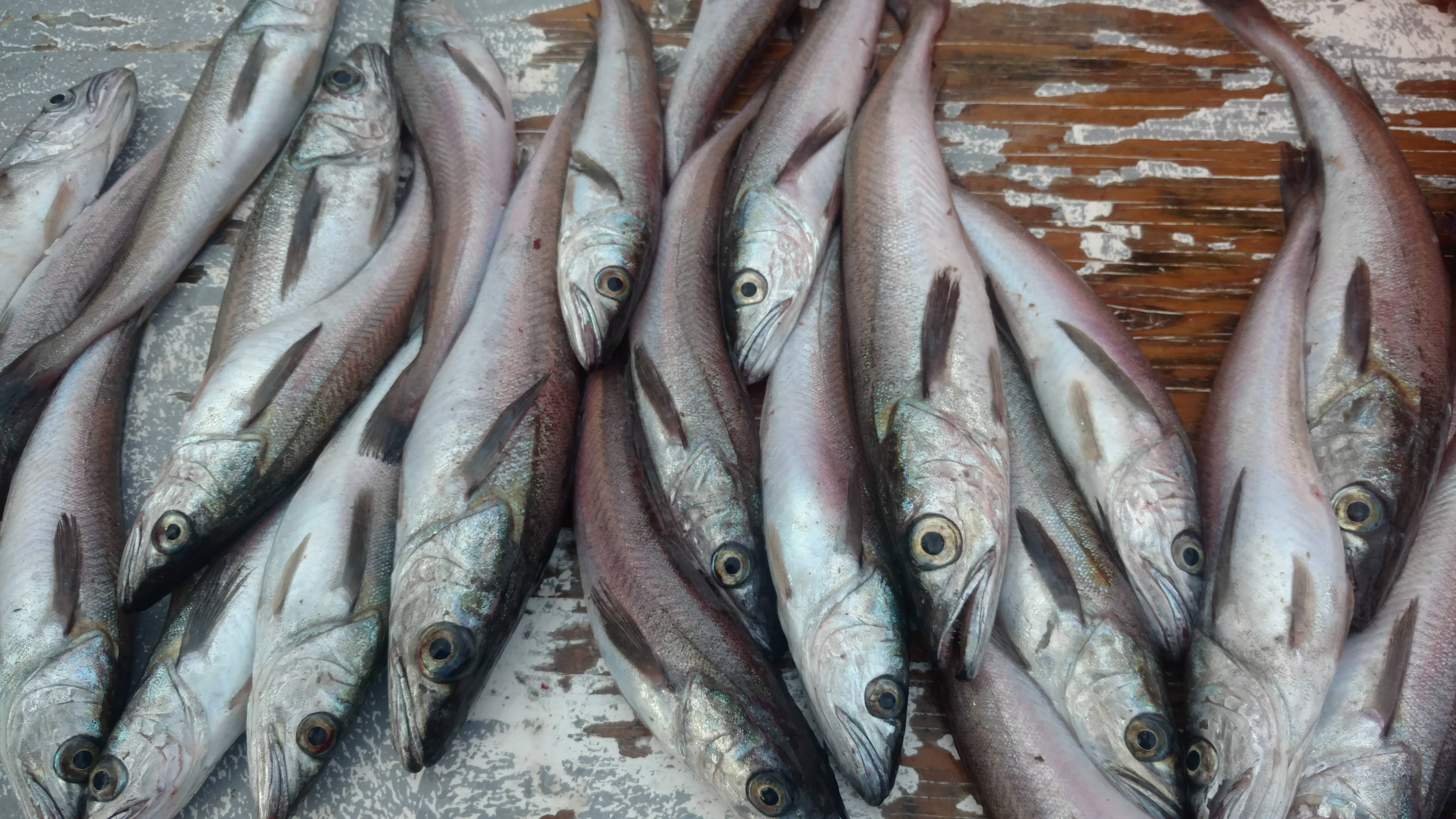
A collection of young North Pacific hake caught off the coast of central California during a bottom-trawl survey

Global capture production of North Pacific hake (Merluccius productus) in thousand tonnes from 1965 to 2022, as reported by the FAO

Pacific hake support one of the most important commercial fisheries off the West Coast of the United States. Of the three recognized stocks mentioned, the latter two stocks are managed by state and local management agencies, but the offshore, or coastal, fishery in U.S. waters is managed by the Pacific Fishery Management Council through its Pacific Coast Groundfish Fishery Management Plan. Originally approved in 1982, the plan now manages over 90 different species through a number of measures, including harvest guidelines, quotas, trip and landing limits, area restrictions, seasonal closures, and gear restrictions (such as minimum mesh size for nets). Annual quotas are the primary management tool used to limit the catch of hake. Pacific hake were declared overfished by the US government in 2002. The stock was declared rebuilt and no longer depleted in 2004. The coast-wide (U.S. and Canada) Pacific hake stock is assessed annually by a joint technical team of scientists from both countries.

In 2003, the U.S. and Canada signed an agreement that allocates a set percentage of the Pacific hake catch to American and Canadian fishermen over the next decade, and established a process for the review of science and the development of management recommendations. Beginning in late 2007, management of Pacific hake and related science activities was coordinated under the provisions of this international treaty with Canada.

A recent stock assessment of the coastal stock estimated that the offshore stock of Pacific hake is at a healthy level (above the management reference points) with overfishing not occurring. Supported by annual stock assessments such as this, the Marine Stewardship Council certified the midwater Pacific hake (whiting) fishery on the coastal stock in the U.S. and Canada as sustainable in 2009 and renewed the certification in 2014.

The local and state-managed Puget Sound and Strait of Georgia stocks are "species of concern" - species that NOAA Fisheries Service has concerns about regarding population status and threats, but has insufficient information to indicate a need to list the species under the Endangered Species Act (ESA). No directed commercial fishery for this stock has occurred since 1991.

The National Marine Fisheries Service received a petition to list the North Pacific hake under the ESA. The petition was denied on 24 November 2000 (65 FR 70514), but concerns and uncertainties remained. During the review for ESA listing, the Georgia Basin distinct population segment (DPS) was identified to include both the Puget Sound and Strait of Georgia stocks. The Georgia Basin DPS of the North Pacific hake (called Pacific hake by NMFS) was made a US National Marine Fisheries Service species of concern. Species of concern are those species about which the National Oceanic and Atmospheric Administration, National Marine Fisheries Service, has some concerns regarding status and threats, but for which insufficient information is available to indicate a need to list the species under the ESA.

Potential range expansion by Humboldt squid has been a cause for concern, because they are predators of hake.

== Nutrition ==
Nutrition information for Pacific hake is as follows.

Serving Size	100g
=== Calories ===	82 kcal
=== Protein ===	16.7 g
Protein calories: 71 kcal Protein calories % : 86.7%	
=== Fat ===	1.2 g
Fat calories: 11 kcal Fat calories % : 13.3%	
=== Carbohydrate ===	0.0 g
Carbohydrate calories: 0 kcal Carbohydrate calories % : 0.0%	
Cholesterol	71.1 mg
Sodium	119 mg

Serving Size	per 100g	per 100 kcal
Omega 3 (EPA+DHA)	451 mg	550 mg
Vitamin B3	1.7 mg	2.1 mg
Vitamin B6	0.1 mg	0.1 mg
Vitamin B12	1.9 mcg	2.3 mcg
Vitamin D	<37 IU	<45 IU
Vitamin E	0 mg	0 mg
Calcium	7 mg	9 mg
Magnesium	25.6 mg	31.0 mg
Phosphorus	166 mg	203 mg
Potassium	303 mg	370 mg
Selenium	30 mcg	37 mcg
