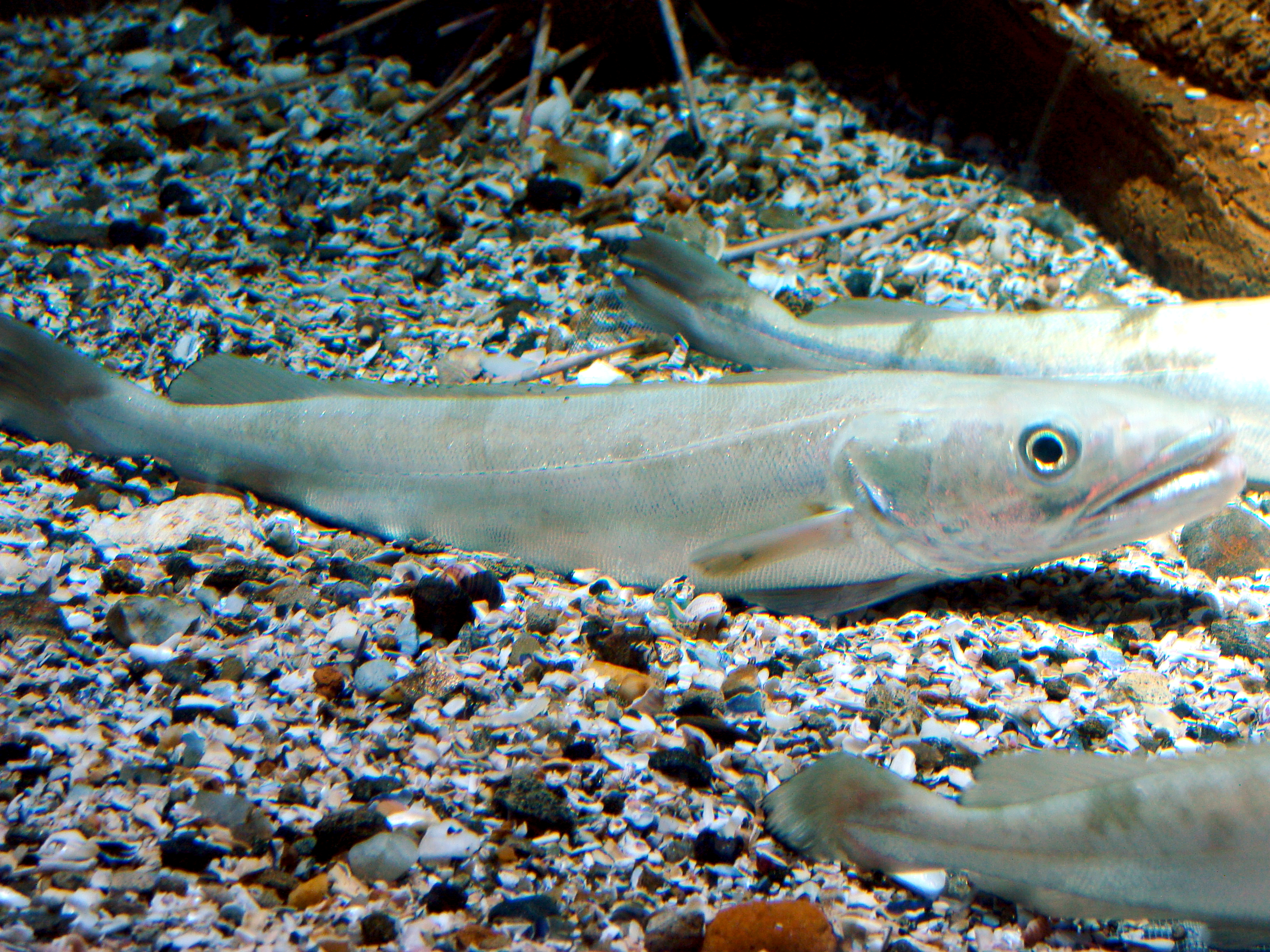

Conservation status
- Least Concern (IUCN 3.1)

Scientific classification
- Kingdom: Animalia
- Phylum: Chordata
- Class: Actinopterygii
- Division: Teleostei
- Order: Gadiformes
- Family: Merlucciidae
- Genus: Merluccius
- Species: M. merluccius

Binomial name
- Merluccius merluccius (Linnaeus, 1758)

Synonyms
- Gadus merluccius Linnaeus, 1758; Gadus ruber Lacépède, 1803; Hidronus marlucius Minding, 1832; Merluccius argentatus Günther, 1862; Merluccius esculentus Risso, 1827; Merluccius linnei Malm, 1877; Merluccius smiridus Rafinesque, 1810; Merluccius vulgaris Fleming, 1828; Merlucius ambiguus Lowe, 1841; Merlucius lanatus Gronow, 1854; Merlucius sinuatus Swainson, 1838; Onus riali Rafinesque, 1810; Trachinoides maroccanus Borodin, 1934; Trachinoides moroccanus Borodin, 1934

= Merluccius merluccius =

European hake

Species of fish

Merluccius merluccius or the European hake is a merluccid hake of the genus Merluccius. Other vernacular names include Cornish salmon and herring hake. It is a predatory species, which was often netted alongside one of its favoured prey, the Atlantic herring, hence the latter common name. It is found in the eastern Atlantic from Norway and Iceland south to Mauritania and into the Mediterranean Sea. It is an important species in European fisheries and is heavily exploited, with some populations being fished unsustainably.

== Description ==
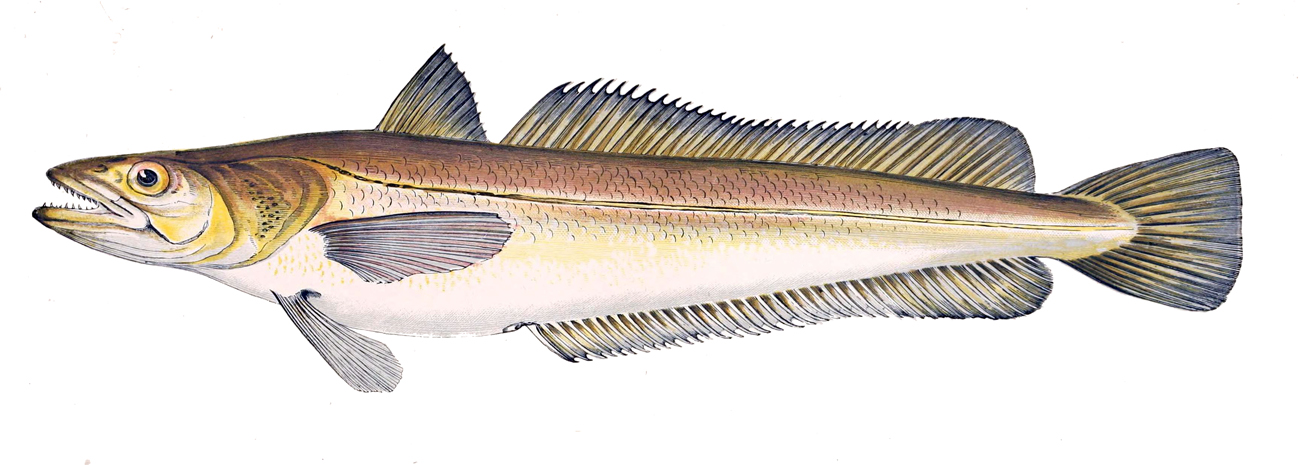
Merluccius merluccius

Merluccius merluccius is a slim-bodied fish with a large head and large jaws in which are set a number of large curved teeth, the lower jaw having two rows of teeth and the upper jaw one row. The inside of the mouth and the branchial cavity are black. The body is at its widest just behind its head. It has two dorsal fins, the first triangular, high with a short base, while the second is long, nearly the same length as the anal fin, and both the second dorsal fin and the anal fin have a slightly convex profile. The first dorsal fin has a single spine and 7 to 10 fin rays; the second dorsal fin has 36 to 40 fin rays and the anal fin has 36 to 40 fin rays. The tips of the pectoral fins extend to the level of the origin of the anal fin in young fish that are less than 20 cm (7.9 in) in standard length but does not do so in adults. The caudal fin is well developed and has a truncate margin. The lateral line is straight and darker than the background colour. It is blue-grey on the back, silvery on the flanks and whitish on the underside. They grow to 180 cm (71 in) but this is rare and a more common larger size is 100 cm (39 in).

== Distribution ==
Merluccius merluccius is found in the eastern Atlantic from Norway and Iceland, south along the European coast to the Straits of Gibraltar and south along the west coast of Africa to Mauritania. It also occurs in the Mediterranean Sea. It extends into the Black Sea but it is restricted to the southern and western (Bulgarian Black Sea Waters, Cape Emine) shorelines of this sea. In the Baltic Sea it does not normally extend further east than the Kattegat but it has been recorded as far east as Lithuania.

== Habitat and biology ==
The European hake is normally found at depths of between 70 m (230 ft) and 370 m (1,210 ft), although it may also occur within a wider range of depths, being found from inshore waters as shallow as 30 m (98 ft) down to 1,000 m (3,300 ft). During the day it stays close to the bottom and at night it becomes more active and uses more of the water column. This species has a very long spawning period, which differs between populations, spawning occurring latest in the more northerly populations. In the Mediterranean spawning lasts from December to June, February–May in the Bay of Biscay, April–July off western Iceland and May–August off western Scotland. In the Adriatic Sea spawning occurs throughout the year but peaks in summer and winter. The female hake are partial spawner, laying eggs four or five times during a spawning season with rests in between. Spawning occurs between 100 and 300 m depth in the Mediterranean and in the Celtic Sea at depths no greater than 150 m (490 ft) . In the Adriatic the recruitment of young hake into the breeding stock has two peaks, the first peak occurring in the spring and the second in the autumn. Juveniles live on muddy bottoms up to the age of three years, when they move towards the coast. Most females attain sexual maturity during their seventh year at around 57 cm (22 in) in length, whilst for males this occurs in their fifth year and on attaining a length of 40 cm (16 in) in the Atlantic, whereas in the Mediterranean, males mature at 26–27 cm (10–11 in) and females at 36–40 cm (14–16 in). The females are faster growing than the males and each female has a fecundity reported as 2 to 7 million eggs. They live to a maximum age of 20 years.

The principal spawning grounds are in the southern portion of its range in the canyons and rocky bottoms of the Bay of Biscay in the shelf break area. The maximum production of eggs occurs at depths of approximately 200 m (660 ft). The larvae are either deposited in the nursery areas of the Bay of Biscay or swept further out to sea, depending on the direction of the current. The more larvae deposited in the nursery areas is highly correlated with successful recruitment of adult hake into the population. After two months, the eggs hatch and the juvenile hake demonstrate a diel vertical migration, staying near the muddy bottoms during daylight hours and ascending to feed at shallower depths during the night. The adults also prefer to rest near the bottom during the day but they do not ascend to as near the surface as the juveniles Individual hake may be seen foraging alone near the seabed but higher in the water column they tend to feed in shoals.

Small European hake up to 16 cm (6.3 in) long, those less than a year old, feed mostly on crustaceans such as krill, mysids and amphipods. It is at this stage of their lives that they prefer deeper water. As they grow and become more piscivorous they migrate to shallower areas where they start to feed on fish. In the Adriatic their main prey are pilchard (Sardina pilchardus), European sprat (Sprattus sprattus) and European anchovy (Engraulis encrasicolus), as well as Atlantic mackerel (Scomber scombrus), Horse mackerel Trachurus spp. and they can also be cannibalistic. Cephalopods were also recorded in the stomachs of sampled hakes from the Adriatic. In the north east Atlantic this species has been recorded feeding on blue whiting, horse mackerel and clupeids and it is regarded as an apex predator in this area. In the central Mediterranean Sea the young hake, between 5 cm (2.0 in) and 10.9 cm (4.3 in) in total length, fed predominantly on the euphausiid Nictiphanes couchi and the mysid Lophogaster typicus with decapods as secondary prey. At total lengths between 11 cm (4.3 in) and 15.9 cm (6.3 in) had a more varied diet with an increased utilisation of euphausiids but they also consumed an increased number of decapods, these were from a wide variety of species, such as Chlorotocus crassicornis, Alpheus glaber, Plesionika heterocarpus, Pasiphaea sivado, and Solenocera membranacea with fish and mysids being less important. Small cephalopods especially Sepiolidae, Sepietta oweniana and Alloteuthis media were also taken.

As the hake grows larger fish become more important in the diet, hake with total lengths of between 16 cm (6.3 in) and 35.9 cm (14.1 in) have diets dominated by clupeids, especially pilchards and anchovies. Once a length of 36 cm (14 in) was attained the fish had shifted to an entirely piscivorous diet and the favoured prey changed to centracanthids such as Spicara flexuosa and Centracanthus cirrus with the importance of clupeids declining at the same time. Decapods were also taken, especially Processa spp. and Solenocera membranacea while mysids, euphausiids and cephalopods were not a feature of the diets of these larger fish. The rate of cannibalism recorded increased with increasing size with the larger fish having a diet consisting of up to 71% smaller conspecifics. In the Atlantic off the Portuguese coasts a study found that hake were opportunistic feeders and preferred the demersal fish species that were most abundant at any given time with the main prey blue whiting, Atlantic mackerel, chub mackerel, European anchovy and pilchard. Its habit of feeding on clupeids led to the vernacular name "herring hake", this may lead to hake being netted along with the herring. This is consistent with a 19th-century account: "It is a very voracious fish, devouring great numbers of herrings and pilchards; hence it is frequently called the Herring Hake."

=== Parasites ===
Merluccius merluccius parasites have been well studied and as many as nineteen species of metazoan parasites have been identified on hake in a single study from the Mediterranean. These included five species of ectoparasite, one species of Monogenea and four species of Copepoda and fourteen species of endoparasite made up of Platyhelminthes: four digeneans, two cestodes and six nematodes: as well as two acanthocephalans.

== Fisheries ==
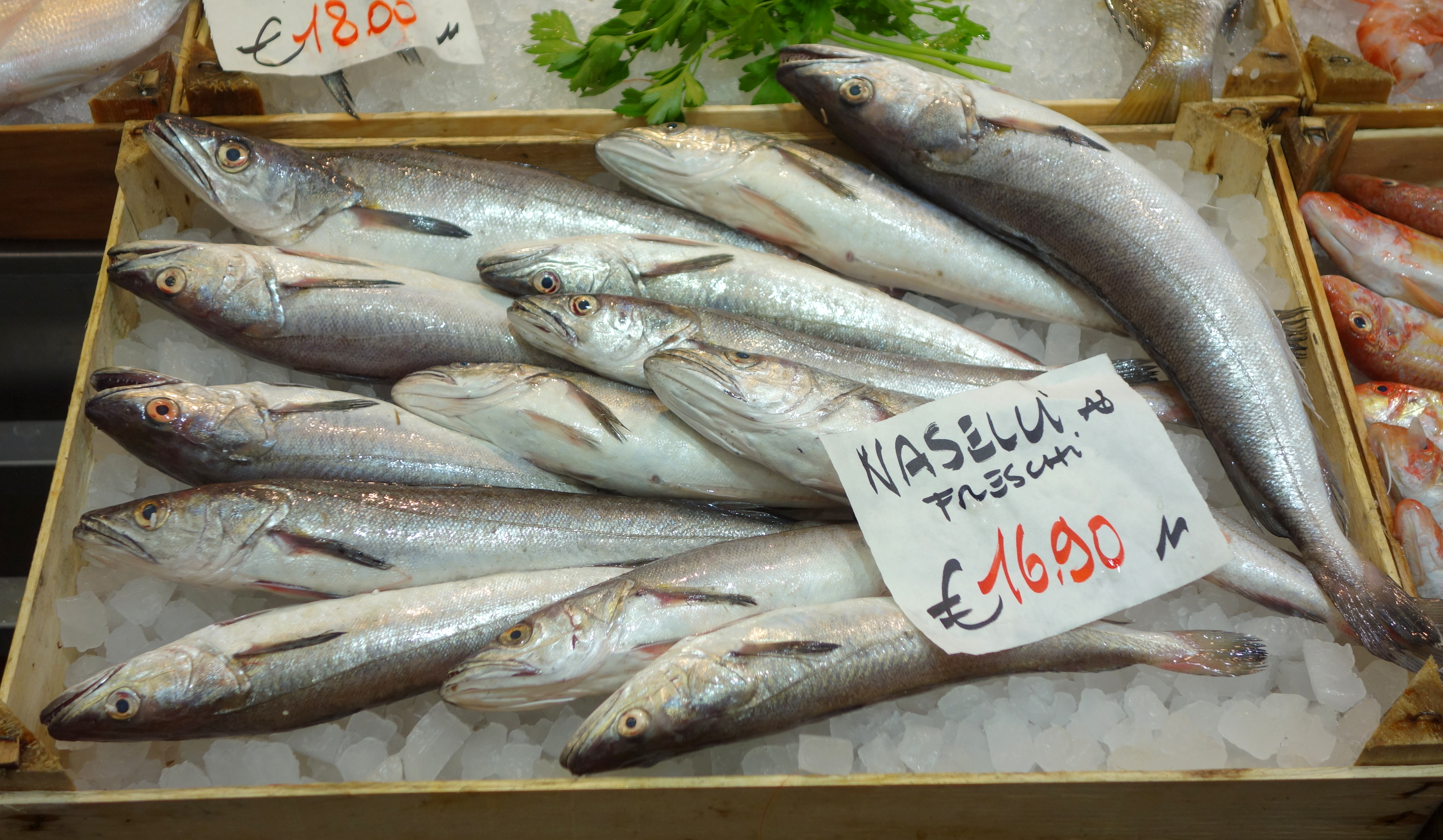
Hake - Mercato Orientale - Genoa, Italy - DSC02485

Global capture production of European hake (Merluccius merluccius) in thousand tonnes from 1950 to 2022, as reported by the FAO

Merluccius merluccius is one of the most important demersal quarry species for fisheries over the western European continental shelf and this means that it is extensively studied. This species is vulnerable to overfishing because it grows slowly and the females attain sexual maturity at a relatively old age. However, there is still some uncertainty around both its population structure and the state of the stocks. More than 160,000 tonnes (180,000 short tons) were landed in 1955 compared to approximately 60,000 tonnes (66,000 short tons) in 2000 although this increased to nearly 100,000 tonnes (110,000 short tons) in 2009 and 2010. Around 12,900 tonnes (14,200 short tons) were landed during 2011 at United Kingdom ports, and this catch was valued £22.5 million, however only 200 tonnes of hake were consumed in the UK that year, so most of this catch was exported. There are two main stocks of European Hake in the Atlantic, a northern and a southern one. The northern stock is thought to be being exploited within its safe biological limits and to have an increasing population, although in 2011 the total allowable catch was exceeded by up to 30%. The southern and Mediterranean populations are thought to be being overexploited and the fisheries to be outside sustainable limits. For example, in the Gulf of Lions hake constituted an important fraction of commercial landings but the stock has been overexploited so that only juveniles and young adults occur on the continental shelf following decades of intensive bottom trawling. The main fishing areas where hake at caught are to the north and west of Scotland, the west and south of Ireland, the Bay of Biscay, the Portuguese coast and the western coast North Africa.

== Conservation ==
The northern European hake stock has recovered since the introduction of measures in 2001. Fisheries are regulated through restrictions on fishing effort, such as selectivity, fishing closures and minimum landing size. Additionally, individual states lay down their own regulations on matters such as minimum landing size, examples being Turkey where the minimum landing size is 25 cm (9.8 in) or Morocco where it is 20 cm (7.9 in), this is also the European Union's minimum landing size. M. merluccius has been assessed on some Regional red Lists and the population in the Mediterranean is classed a Vulnerable, in the Baltic as Near Threatened and that in the Eastern Central Atlantic as Least Concern. Overall the Northeast Atlantic stock appears to be expanding its range, and of the two distinct stocks, northern and southern, the northern stock has shown an increase in stock biomass, which over the five years to 2015 increased by a factor of five. On the other hand, the southern stock is still overfished, albeit slightly, and the stock biomass in the 10 years to 2015 increased. Therefore, the IUCN class Merluccius merluccius as Least Concern.

== Use as food ==
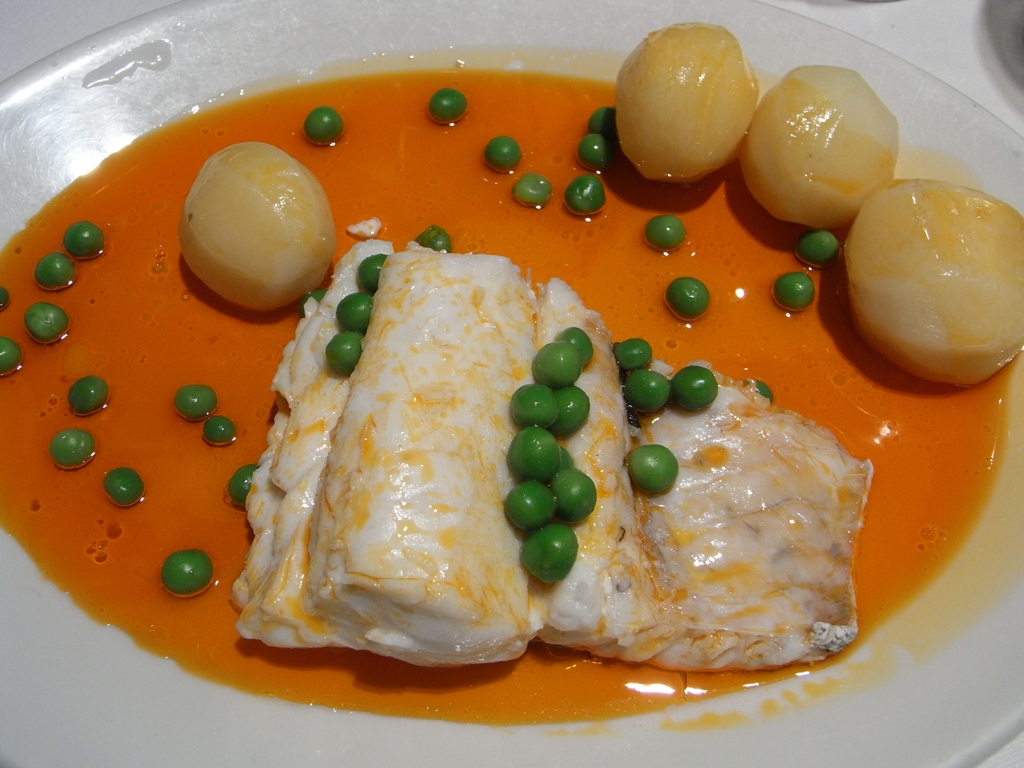
Pescada á galega, Galician-style hake.

European hake is mainly sold in its fresh form, but it may also be frozen, dried, salted and canned. The flesh has a mild flavour, more subtle than that of cod with a white flaky texture. The raw flesh is quite soft but when it has been cooked the texture changes to firm and meaty. In France this popular species is marketed as "colin" and occasionally as "saumon blanc", i.e. "white salmon". It is also a popular food fish in Iberia where it is grilled, pan-fried and baked. The meat can be matched with strong flavours and hake is often cooked with tomatoes, garlic, chorizo and paprika.

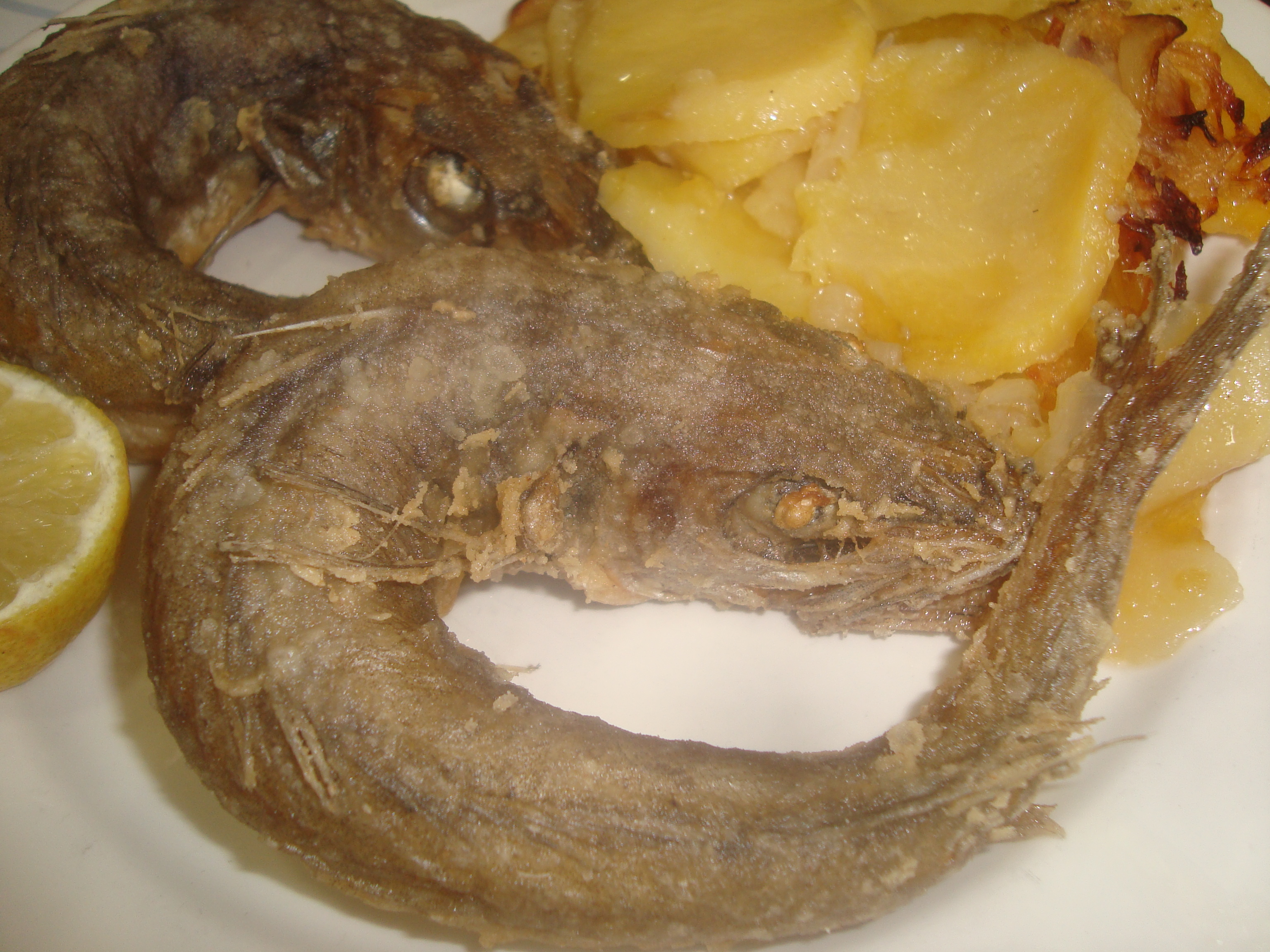
Pescadillas are often presented biting their tails.

A medium-sized hake, known in Spanish as pescadilla, is often presented with its mouth biting its tail receiving the name of pescadilla de rosca ("torus hake"). La pescadilla que se muerde la cola, "the hake that bites its tail", is a proverbial Spanish expression for circular reasoning and vicious circles.
