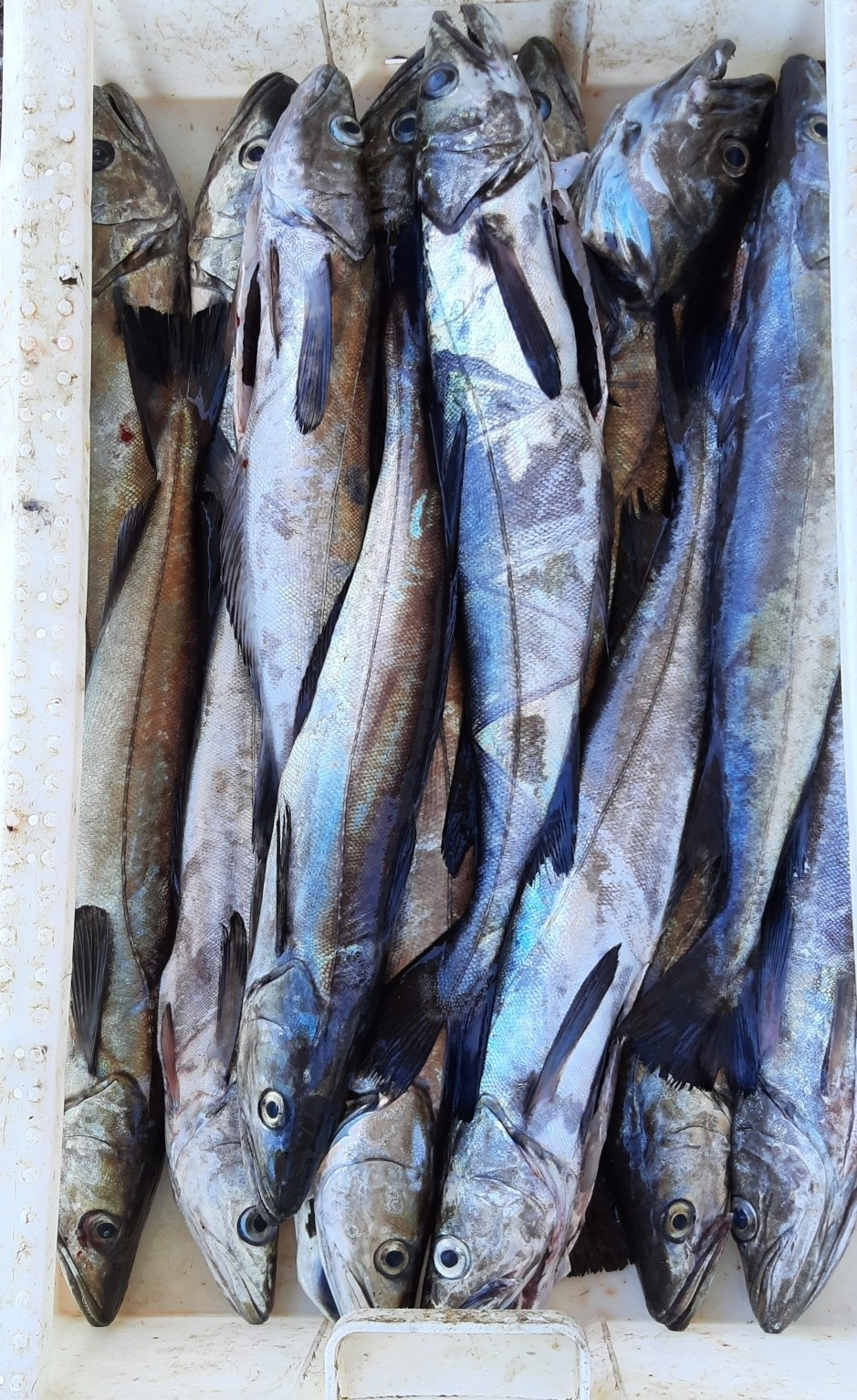

Scientific classification
- Kingdom: Animalia
- Phylum: Chordata
- Class: Actinopterygii
- Order: Gadiformes
- Family: Merlucciidae
- Genus: Merluccius
- Species: M. australis

Binomial name
- Merluccius australis (Hutton, 1872)

Synonyms
- Gadus australis Hutton, 1872; Merlangius australis (Hutton, 1872); Merluccius polylepis Ginsburg, 1954

= Merluccius australis =

Species of fish

Merluccius australis, the southern hake, is a species of fish from the family Merlucciidae, the true hakes. It is found in the southern Pacific and Atlantic Oceans with two disjunct populations, one around southern South America and the other in the waters around New Zealand.

== Description ==
Merluccius australis has a more slender body compared to other species of Merluccius, with a short head which makes up around a quarter of its standard length and a protruding lower jaw with some visible teeth. The anterior dorsal fin has a single spine and 9 to 12 fin rays and the posterior dorsal fin has 39 to 45 fin rays. The anal fin has 40 to 46 fin rays and the pectoral fins are long and thin, but they do not reach as far as the origin of anal fin in specimens longer than 50 cm standard length. The caudal fin margin is normally truncate, but in smaller specimens it can be slightly emarginate. The scales are small and there are 144 to 171 scales along the lateral line. They have a steel grey back which is tinged with blue, paler on sides, and a silvery white belly with dark fins. It grows to a maximum length of 160 cm but lengths of between 60 cm and 100 cm are more commonly recorded.

== Distribution ==
Merluccius australis has two distinct populations one in New Zealand and the other in the eastern South Pacific and western South Atlantic. The New Zealand population is found over the Chatham Rise, Campbell Plateau and around South Island north to the East Cape, the South American population extends from Chiloé Island south to 59°S in the Pacific, around Cape Horn and north to 38°S in the South Atlantic. It is also found off the Falkland Islands.

== Habitat and biology ==
Merluccius australis occurs at depths between 415 and 1 000 m with temperatures at the bottom of 5.8 to 8.0 °C off New Zealand and 62 to 800 m with bottom temperatures 3.8 to 9.0 °C in South American waters. The adults are probably migratory, moving south to feed during the Austral summer and returning north in the winter to spawn. Off South America spawning takes place from May to August south of 47°S, in three separate areas. The spawning areas are situated in fjords and channels. They reach sexual maturity at around 65 cm in length for males and 85 cm for females, around 6 years of age. The sex ratio is skewed towards females. The adults are predatory, feeding on southern blue whiting, whiptails, nototheniids and squid. Off New Zealand population the population spawns from July to August in the waters west of South Island at depths from 800 to 1000m, and here they also feed mainly on fish, particularly gadoids but also on squid, krill and benthic invertebrates. On the northern part of the Campbell Plateau spawning occurs between September and November and at the Chatham Rise between November and January. They can live as long as 28 years.

== Taxonomy ==
Merluccius australis has two subspecies according to some authorities:

- Merluccius australis australis Hutton, 1872, New Zealand
- Merluccius australis polylepis Ginsburg, 1954, South America

However, the existence of separate populations made up of differently sized individuals off the east and west coasts of New Zealand suggest that M. australis may not be a single species.

A new species of hake which was said to be largely sympatric with M. australis but which was also said to be found off Japan was described in 2006, Merluccius tasmanicus, but this taxon is not universally accepted a valid and it may be a synonym of M. australis.

== Fisheries ==
In New Zealand M. australis are caught almost exclusively by large trawlers, which both target this species and take it as by‐catch when the primary target is species such as hoki (Macruronus novaezelandiae) and southern blue whiting (Micromesistius australis). The population off the west coast of South Island has been estimated to have an unfished biomass of 88,900 tonnes and this fishery consistently produces the greatest annual landings. The Sub‐Antarctic population is the largest of the three populations and has an estimated unfished spawning biomass of 94,200 tonnes, however this stock has probably undergone the lowest levels of fishing. The third stock, in the area of the Chatham Rise is the smallest and has an unfished biomass of 37,000 tonnes has suffered the heaviest exploitation and is currently considered to be in a rebuilding phase.

The South American population is targeted by fisheries mainly from by Argentina and Chile. The annual catch reached a peak in 1987 but has now stabilised at between 3000 tonnes and 4000 tonnes in the Atlantic and around 25000 tonnes in the Pacific. Caught with trawls and marketed fresh, frozen, and as fishmeal.
