= Panama hake =

Conservation status
- Least Concern (IUCN 3.1)

Scientific classification
- Kingdom: Animalia
- Phylum: Chordata
- Class: Actinopterygii
- Division: Teleostei
- Order: Gadiformes
- Family: Merlucciidae
- Genus: Merluccius
- Species: M. angustimanus

Binomial name
- Merluccius angustimanus Garman, 1899

Species of fish

The Panama hake (Merluccius angustimanus), also known as the dwarf hake, is a merluccid hake found off the west coast of the Americas from Del Mar, California, to Ensenada de Tumaco, Colombia.

== Description ==
The Panama hake is a relatively small species which does not normally grow to a greater length than 30 cm, although specimens have been described up to 40 cm. It has a relatively long head and long pectoral fins which reach at least to the origin of the anal fin. The anterior dorsal fin has a single spine and 9–12 fin rays, while the posterior dorsal fin has 36–40 rays. The caudal fin can be truncate or emarginated and it has 121–134 scales along the lateral line. It is a silvery colour above and whitish below.

== Distribution ==
The Panama hake is an eastern Pacific species which is found from southern California and the Gulf of California south to Colombia, although its reported presence in many areas within this range needs verification.

== Habitat and biology ==
The Panama Hake is a demersal, bathypelagic species which occurs from the shallow continental shelf at 80m to the upper continental slope as deep as 500m, as well as in the ocean's midwaters and over sea mounts such as Uncle Sam Bank. It has pelagic eggs and larvae and feeds on fish and invertebrates. It spawns from April to June or even later. they reach sexual maturity when they attain a length of 18 to 19 cm. They may live for up to seven years.

== Fishing ==
M. angustimanus has little importance commercially because of its small size and low abundance, although it fetches high prices when it occasionally shows up on the market, as it is sometimes exported on a local level.
