= Merluccius paradoxus =

Deep-water Cape hake

Scientific classification
- Kingdom: Animalia
- Phylum: Chordata
- Class: Actinopterygii
- Order: Gadiformes
- Family: Merlucciidae
- Genus: Merluccius
- Species: M. paradoxus

Binomial name
- Merluccius paradoxus Franca, 1960

Species of fish

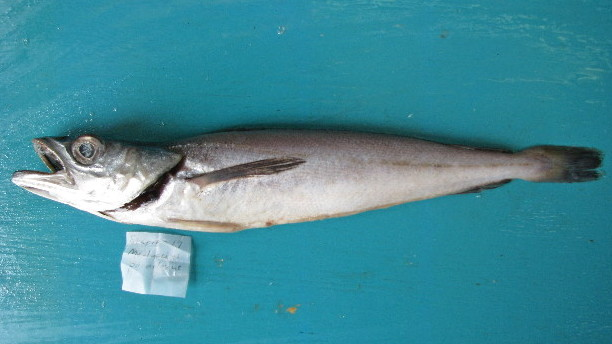

Merluccius paradoxus, the deep-water Cape hake, is a merluccid hake of the genus Merluccius, found in the south-eastern Atlantic Ocean, along the coast of Southern Africa, south of Angola. Its range extends in decreasing abundance around the southern coast of Africa and into the Indian Ocean, but it is at its most plentiful in the cold, nutrient-rich fishing grounds of the Benguela Current.

In South Africa, in combination with Merluccius capensis, the shallow-water Cape hake, it is one of the most important commercial food fishes and locally is generally known as "stockfish" (this English name being derived from the Afrikaans stokvis).

Very similar to M. merluccius (European hake), it has an average length of 40–60 cm, up to a maximum of about 80 cm. It lives close to the bottom in muddy areas on the continental shelf and slope. It usually is to be found at depths of 200 to 850 m, although most commonly below 400 m. Immature specimens feed on small deep-sea fishes and crustaceans, especially Euphausiacea. Mature hake feed mainly on fish, squid, and crustaceans, especially Mysidacea and Euphausiacea.

Little information is available on its migratory habits as compared to those of M. capensis, which has been fairly well studied.

The deep-water Cape hake is often fished together with M. capensis, which usually occurs at shallower depths. Most reported commercial catches combine both species, but towards the northwest coast of Southern Africa, in the region of Angola, M. paradoxus does not occur.
