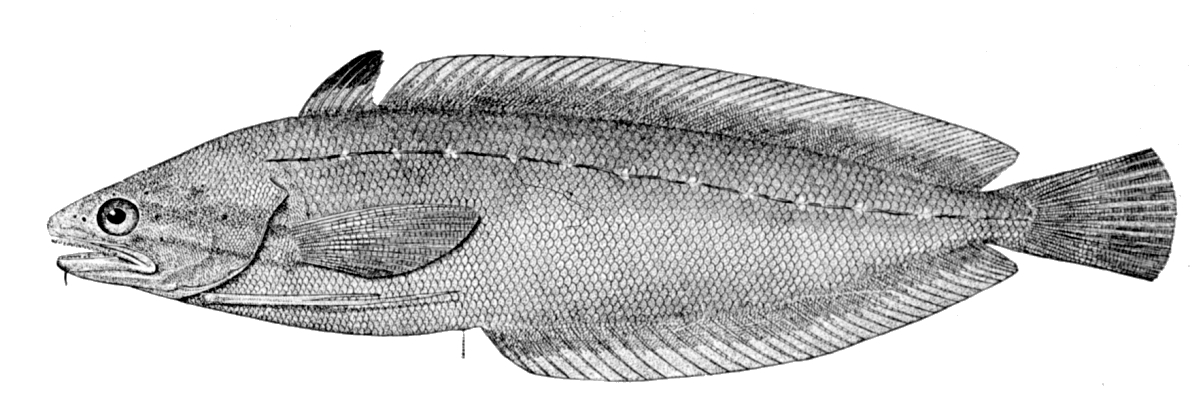

Conservation status
- Least Concern (IUCN 3.1)

Scientific classification
- Kingdom: Animalia
- Phylum: Chordata
- Class: Actinopterygii
- Order: Gadiformes
- Family: Phycidae
- Genus: Urophycis
- Species: U. regia

Binomial name
- Urophycis regia (Walbaum, 1792)

Synonyms
- Blennius regius Walbaum, 1792; Enchelyopus regalis Bloch & Schneider, 1801; Gadus punctatus Mitchill, 1814; Phycis punctatus (Mitchill, 1814); Urophycis regius (Walbaum, 1792)

= Urophycis regia =

Species of fish

Urophycis regia (spotted hake or spotted codling) is a species of phycid hake.

== Description ==
The spotted hake can be distinguished by its tapering body, two dorsal fins, and filamentous pelvic fins similar to the white and red hake. It differs from the two, however, but not having a third ray of the dorsal fin prolonged into a filament, by having larger scales, and a larger mouth with the end of the maxillary behind the level of the back of the eye. Its coloration is distinctive, having a black distal half of the dorsal fin with a narrow white margin. The lateral line is black but interrupted by a series of white spots. Its pelvic fins are white.

== Distribution and habitat ==
The spotted codling is found in the northwestern Atlantic from Canada to the Gulf of Mexico.
