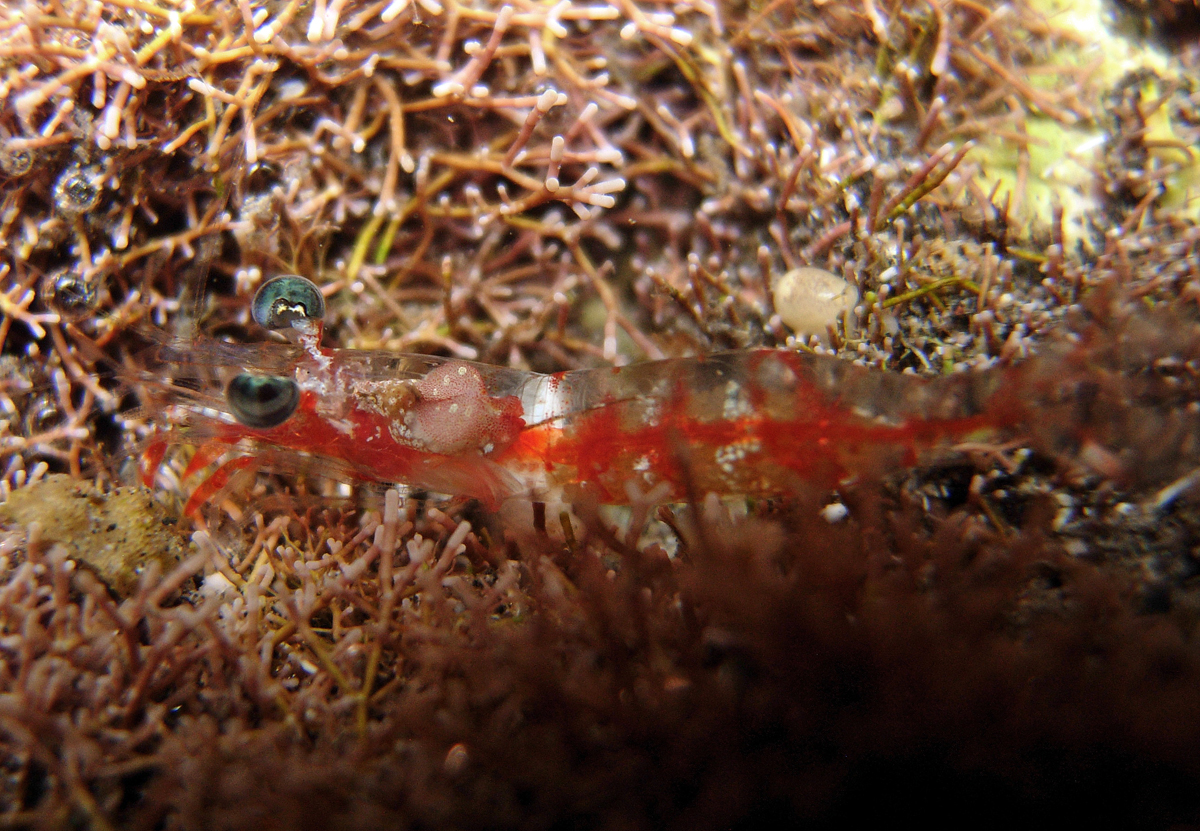

Scientific classification
- Kingdom: Animalia
- Phylum: Arthropoda
- Clade: Pancrustacea
- Class: Malacostraca
- Order: Decapoda
- Suborder: Pleocyemata
- Infraorder: Caridea
- Superfamily: Processoidea; Ortmann, 1896
- Family: Processidae; Ortmann, 1896

Genera
- Ambidexter Manning & Chace, 1971; Clytomanningus Chace, 1997; Hayashidonus Chace, 1997; Nikoides Paul'son, 1875; Processa Leach, 1815

= Processidae =

Family of crustaceans

The Processidae are a family of shrimp, comprising 65 species in five genera, and the only family in the superfamily Processoidea. They are small, nocturnal animals, mostly living in shallow seas, particularly on grass flats. The first pereiopods are usually asymmetrical, with a claw on one, but not the other (Ambidexter forming the exception to this rule). The rostrum is generally a simple projection from the front of the carapace, with two teeth, one at the tip, and one further back.
