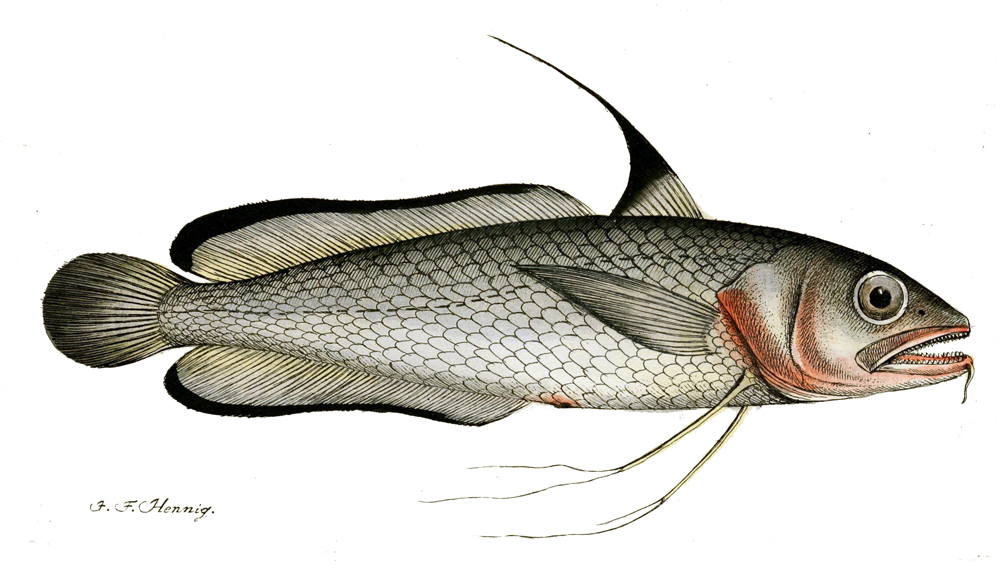
- Greater forkbeard (Phycis blennoides)
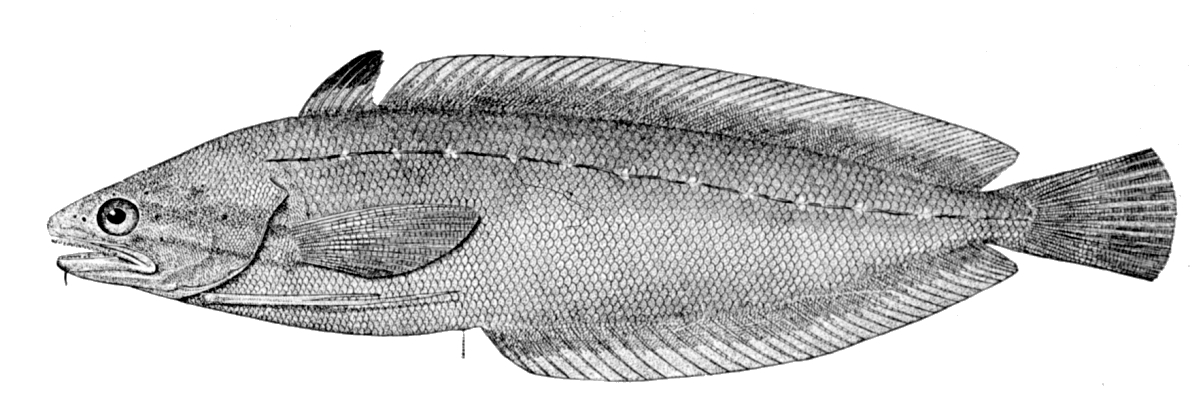
- Spotted codling (Urophycis regia)

Scientific classification
- Kingdom: Animalia
- Phylum: Chordata
- Class: Actinopterygii
- Order: Gadiformes
- Suborder: Gadoidei
- Family: Phycidae; Swainon, 1838

Genera
- Phycis; Urophycis

= Phycidae =

Phycid hakes

Family of fishes

The Phycidae are a family of hakes in the order Gadiformes. They are native to the Atlantic Ocean, but the juveniles of some species enter estuaries. Sometimes this family is classified as the subfamily Phycinae of the cod family, Gadidae, but Eschmeyer's Catalog of Fishes currently classifies it as a distinct family within the Gadoidei.
