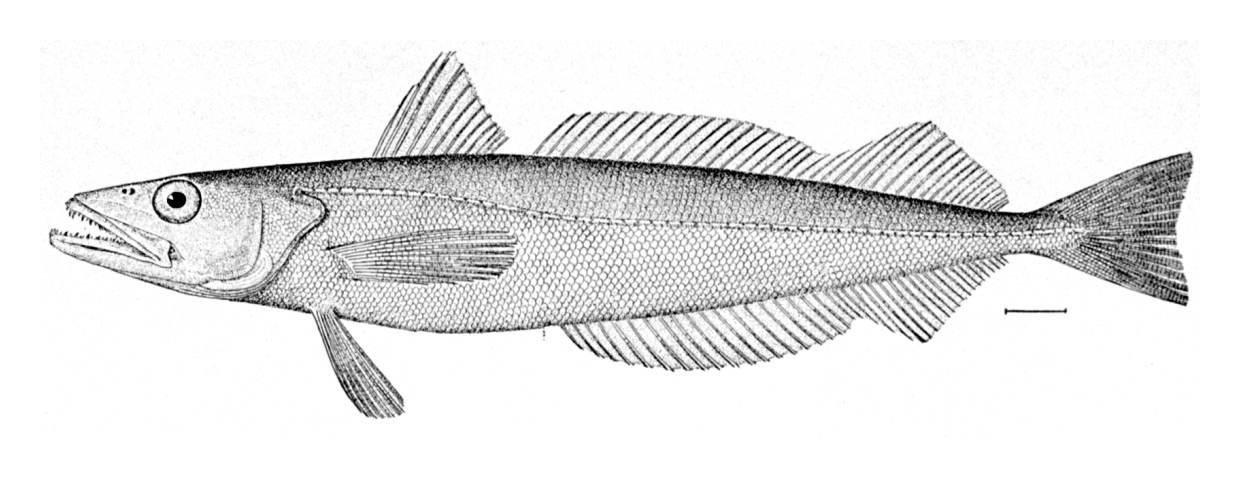
- Silver hake, Merluccius bilinearis

Scientific classification
- Kingdom: Animalia
- Phylum: Chordata
- Class: Actinopterygii
- Division: Teleostei
- Order: Gadiformes
- Suborder: Merluccioidei
- Family: Merlucciidae; T. N. Gill, 1884

Genera
- Lyconodes Gilchrist, 1922; Merluccius Rafinesque, 1810

= Merlucciidae =

Merlucciidae Temporal range: Middle Eocene–present

Family of fishes

The Merlucciidae, commonly called merluccid hakes /mərˈluːtʃɪd/, are a family of cod-like fish, containing two genera. They are the only member of the suborder Merlucciodei. They are native to cold water in the Atlantic and Pacific oceans, and typically are found at depths greater than 50 m (160 ft) in subtropical, temperate, sub-Arctic or sub-Antarctic regions.

These predatory fish are up to 1.55 m (5 ft 1 in) in length, though most only reach about half that length, inhabiting the waters of the continental shelf and upper continental slope, where they feed on small fish such as lanternfishes. Several species are important commercial fish, for example the North Pacific hake (Merluccius productus) that is fished off western North America.

This family contained many more genera in the past. However, Steindachneria, Lyconus and Macruronus have been found to represent their own distinct clades more closely related to the rattails, and are thus now placed in their own families within the Macrouroidei. This leaves Merluccius and Lyconodes as the only remaining members of the Merlucciidae and Merluccioidei.

Fossil merlucciid remains are known from the mid-late Eocene of Sverdlovsk, Russia, suggesting that they inhabited the former Turgai Strait. The fossil gadiform †Rhinocephalus Casier, 1966 from the Early Eocene of England has sometimes been considered an early merlucciid, but is currently thought to belong to an uncertain family. Alleged merluciid fossils from the middle Eocene-aged La Meseta Formation of Seymour Island, Antarctica are now thought to belong to small individuals of the early notothenioid †Mesetaichthys.

== In popular culture ==
Mascot of FC Lorient
