= Yorktown Formation =

Geological Formation in the United States

- Stratigraphic range: Early to Middle Pliocene, 4.8–3.15 Ma
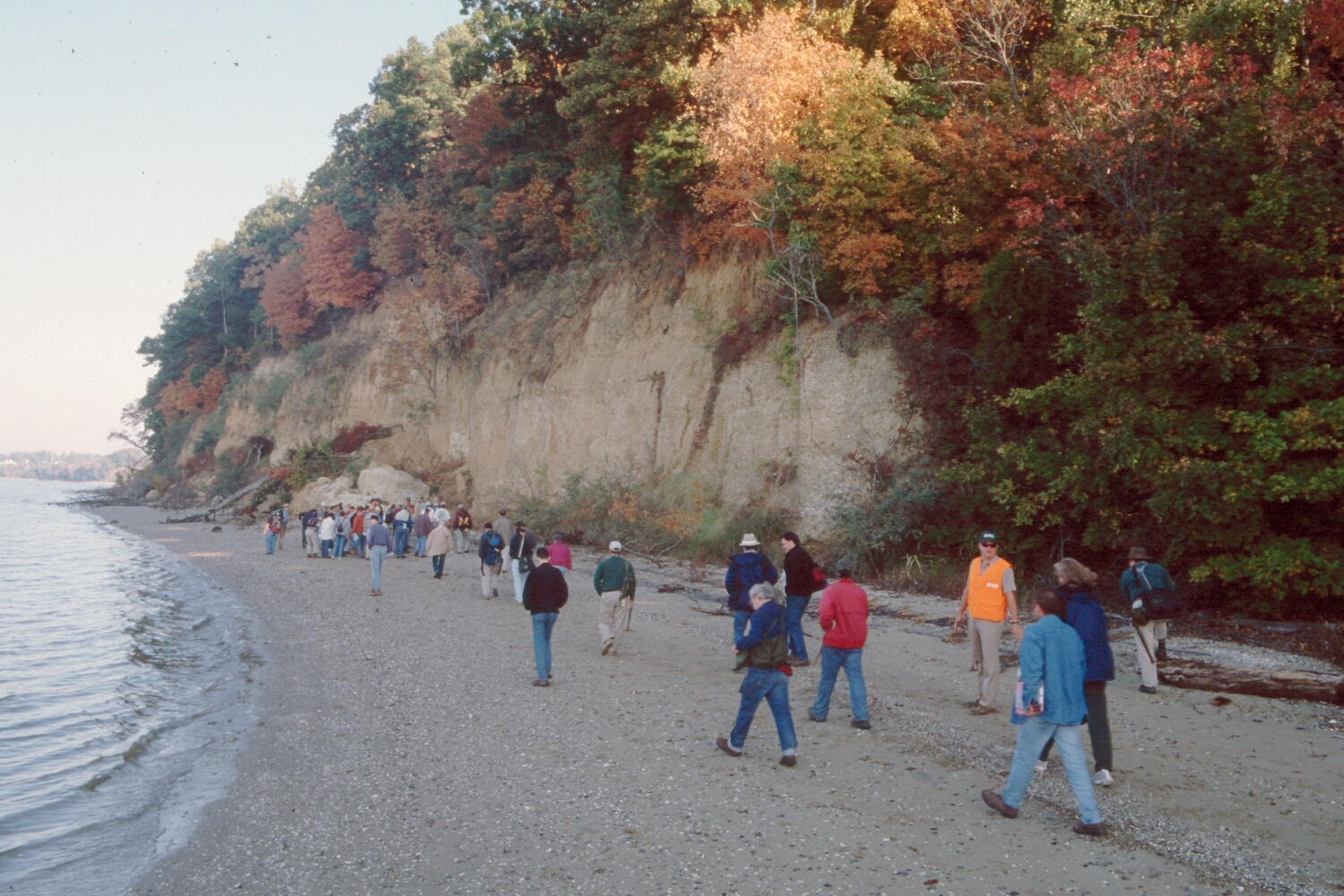
- Outcrop of the Yorktown Formation at Carters Grove Bluffs along the James River
- Type: sedimentary
- Unit of: Chesapeake Group
- Sub-units: Sunken Meadow Member, Rushmere Member, Morgarts Beach Member, Moore House Member, Tunnels Mill Member
- Underlies: Croatan Formation
- Overlies: Eastover Formation, Pungo River Formation

Lithology
- Primary: Sandstone, claystone
- Other: shells

Location
- Region: Atlantic Coastal Plain of North America
- Extent: Maryland, Virginia, North Carolina, South Carolina

Type section
- Named for: Yorktown, Virginia
- Named by: Clark and Miller, 1906

The Yorktown Formation is a mapped bedrock unit in the Coastal Plain of Maryland, Virginia, North Carolina and South Carolina. It is overconsolidated and highly fossiliferous.

== Description ==
The Yorktown is composed largely of overconsolidated sand and clay with abundant calcareous shells, primarily bivalves.

=== Stratigraphy ===
The Yorktown unconformably overlies the Miocene Eastover Formation, and conformably underlies the Pliocene Croatan Formation.

The Yorktown was divided into members by Ward and Blackwelder (1980). These are in ascending order: Sunken Meadow Member, Rushmere Member, Morgarts Beach Member, and Moore House Member. The uppermost Tunnels Mill Member is recognized in Maryland only.

=== Notable exposures ===
- Type Section: Yorktown, Virginia on southwest side of York River, York County
- Carters Grove Bluffs, north side of James River 37°12′33″N 76°38′00″W
- Moore House Bluff, southwest side of York River, York County 37°13′25″N 76°29′14″W (very close to type section)

==== Aurora mine ====
The most diverse paleobiota of the Yorktown Formation has been recovered from the Aurora mine of Beaufort County, North Carolina, where it overlies the intensively-mined Pungo River Formation. As with the Pungo River Formation, this locality has become a prime target for fossil collecting, and some of the most notable fossils from both formations are displayed at the Aurora Fossil Museum. Foraminiferal analyses suggests that this locality belongs the Early Pliocene-aged Sunken Meadow Member. The Yorktown fauna at the Aurora mine is far more diverse than the Pungo River fauna from the same locality, as the Pungo River sediments are mechanically processed for their phosphorite, while the Yorktown sediments are discarded and are thus in better condition for study. This locality was likely deposited in a bay, with older sediments being deposited at a depth of 80 to 100 metres (260 to 330 ft) underwater, while younger sediments were deposited at a depth of 30 metres (98 ft) underwater.

Clear differences are seen in the paleoichthyofauna of the Pungo River Formation and the overlying Yorktown Formation at the Aurora mine, with the Pungo River fauna representing almost exclusively warm-water taxa, while the Yorktown fauna preserves both warm and cooler-water taxa. These fossils provide important evidence for the significant cooling of ocean temperatures between the Miocene and Pliocene. However, the invertebrate fauna from both time periods appears to have cool-temperate affinities.

== Age ==
Hazel (1971) revised the age of the Yorktown from Miocene to Late Miocene to Early Pliocene using ostracod biostratigraphy. The age was revised by Gibson (1983) to extend into the Middle Pliocene based on foraminifera. Further biostratigraphic work with ostracods and foraminifera was completed by Cronin (1991), which also summarized previous investigations. More recently, Spivey (2025) dated the Sunken Meadow Member to the Zanclean stage, about 4.8 to 3.8 million years ago, while Dowsett et al (2001) dated the Rushmere and Morgarts Beach Members to the early-mid Piacenzian stage, about 3.3 to 3.15 million years ago. The deposition of these latter two members is thought to be linked to a marine transgression caused by the mid-Piacenzian warm period.

== Invertebrates ==
- Bivalves, including Glycymeris subovata, Chesapecten jeffersonius, Chesapecten madisonius, Mercenaria tridacnoides, Panopera reflexa, Chama, Ensis, Striarca and Noetia (see Noetiidae), Cerastoderma, Dosinia, Mulinia, Kuphus (Shipworm), Panope (Geoduck), and the oyster Ostrea
- Gastropods, including Crucibulum, Calliostoma, Busycon, Turritella, and Crepidula
- Scleractinian corals, including Septastrea marylandica, Paracyathus vaughani (see Caryophylliidae), and Astrangia lineata
- Ostracods
- Bryozoans
- Barnacles, including Balanus
- Worms
- Sponges

== Vertebrate paleobiota ==
As per the Paleobiology Database:

=== Cartilaginous fishes ===
Based on Purdy et al. (2001):

==== Sharks ====
Genus	Species	Locality	Notes	Images
Alopias	A. vulpinus		The modern common thresher.	
Carcharhinus	C. leucas		The modern bull shark.	
Carcharhinus	C. macloti		The modern hardnose shark.	
Carcharodon	C. carcharias		The modern great white shark.	
Carcharodon	"C. xiphodon"		A relative of the great white shark.	
Carcharias	C. taurus		The modern sand tiger shark.	
Chaenogaleus	C. affinis		A relative of the hooktooth shark.	
Echinorhinus	E. cf. blakei		A bramble shark.	
Galeocerdo	G. cf. cuvier		A tiger shark, potentially the modern tiger shark.	
Hemipristis	H. serra		A relative of the snaggletooth shark.	
Hexanchus	H. sp.		A sixgill shark.	
Isistius	I. sp.		A cookiecutter shark.	
Isurus	I. oxyrinchus		The modern shortfin mako shark.	
Lamna	L. sp.		A relative of the porbeagle.	
Megachasma	M. sp.		A relative of the megamouth shark.	
Negaprion	N. brevirostris		The modern lemon shark.	
Notorynchus	N. cepedianus		The modern broadnose sevengill shark.	
Odontaspis	O. cuspidata		A relative of the smalltooth sand tiger.	
Otodus	O. megalodon		A megatooth shark, the megalodon.	
Paragaleus	P. sp.		A weasel shark.	
Parotodus	P. benedenii		A lamniform shark of uncertain affinities.	
Scyliorhinus	S. sp.		A catshark.	
Sphyrna	S. lewini		The modern scalloped hammerhead.	
Sphyrna	S. zygaena		The modern smooth hammerhead.	
Sphyrna	S. cf. media		A hammerhead shark, potentially the modern scoophead.	
Squalus	S. sp.		A dogfish.	
Squatina	S. sp.		An angelshark.	

==== Rays ====
Genus	Species	Locality	Notes	Images
Aetobatus	A. sp.		An eagle ray.	
Bathytoshia (=Dasyatis)	B. centroura		The modern roughtail stingray.	
Mobula	M. sp.		A devil ray.	
Pristis	P. cf. pectinatus		A sawfish, potentially the modern smalltooth sawfish.	
Raja	R. sp.		A skate.	

=== Ray-finned fishes ===
Based on Purdy et al. (2001):

Genus	Species	Locality	Notes	Images
Acanthocybium	A. solandri		The modern wahoo.	
Acipenser	A. cf. oxyrhynchus		A sturgeon, potentially the modern Atlantic sturgeon.	
?Agonidae indet.			A potential poacher of uncertain affinities.	
Alosa	A. cf. sapidissima		A shad, potentially the modern American shad.	
Aluterus	A. sp.		A filefish.	
Ammodytes	A. hexapterus		The modern Arctic sand lance.	
Anisotremus	A. sp.		A grunt.	
Archosargus	A. cf. probatocephalus		A porgy, potentially the modern sheepshead.	
Astroscopus	A. sp.		A stargazer.	
Auxis	A. sp.		A frigate tuna.	
Bagre	B. sp.		A sea catfish.	
Brotula	B. barbata		The modern bearded brotula.	
Caulolatilus	C. cf. cyanops		A deepwater tilefish, potentially the modern blackline tilefish.	
Centropristis	C. cf. striata		A seabass, potentially the modern black sea bass.	
Ceratoscopelus	C. maderensis		The modern Madeira lanternfish.	
Chilomycterus	C. schoepfi		The modern striped burrfish.	
Chilomycterus	?C. sp		A giant Diodontidae, known from two 71mm long tooth plates similar to Chilomycterus reticulatus. These plates suggest it may have reached over 1.5 m in length.	
Citharichthys	C. sp.		A sanddab.	
Conger	C. cf. oceanicus		A conger eel, potentially the modern American conger.	
Congridae indet.			A conger eel of uncertain affinities.	
Cynoscion	C. cf. nebulosus		A weakfish, potentially the modern spotted seatrout.	
Diplectrum	D. cf. formosum		A sand perch, potentially the modern sand perch.	
Epinephelus	E. sp.		A grouper.	
Equetus	E. cf. umbrosus		A drumfish, potentially the modern cubbyu.	
Gadus	G. cf. morhua		A cod, potentially the modern Atlantic cod.	
Istiophorus	I. platypterus		The modern sailfish.	
Kajikia	K. albida		The modern white marlin.	
Kathetostoma	K. sp.		A stargazer.	
Leiostomus	L. sp.		A relative of the spot.	
Lagodon	L. cf. rhomboides		A porgy, potentially the modern pinfish.	
Lopholatilus	L. chamaeleonticeps		The modern great northern tilefish.	
Lopholatilus	L. rayus		An extinct deepwater tilefish.	
Lophius	L. cf. americanus		A monkfish, potentially the modern American anglerfish.	
Makaira	M. indica		The modern black marlin.	
Makaira	M. nigricans		The modern Atlantic blue marlin.	
Makaira	M. purdyi		An extinct marlin.	
Melanogrammus	M. cf. aeglefinus		A cod, potentially the modern haddock.	
Merluccius	M. albidus		The modern offshore hake.	
Merluccius	M. cf. bilinearis		A hake, the modern silver hake.	
Merluccius	M. sp.		A hake.	
Merlangiogadus	M. congatus		An extinct gadid.	
Micropogonias	M. sp.		A drumfish.	
Mola	M. chelonopsis		An extinct ocean sunfish.	
Mycteroperca	M. sp.		A grouper.	
Ophidion	O. grayi		The modern blotched cusk-eel.	
Opsanus	O. tau		The modern oyster toadfish.	
Pagrus	P. hyneus		An extinct relative of the modern common seabream.	
Paralichthys	P. sp.		A largetooth flounder.	
Pleuronectidae indet.			A righteye flounder of uncertain affinities.	
Pogonias	P. cf. cromis		A drumfish, potentially the modern black drum.	
Pomatomus	P. saltatrix		The modern bluefish.	
Prionotus	P. cf. evolans		A searobin, potentially the modern striped searobin.	
Pterothrissus	P. sp.		A gissu.	
Sarda	S. aff. sarda		A bonito similar to the modern Atlantic bonito.	
Sciaenidae indet.			A drumfish of uncertain affinities.	
Sciaenops	S. ocellatus		The modern red drum.	
Scombridae indet.			A mackerel of uncertain affinities.	
Seriola	S. sp.		An amberjack.	
Serranidae indet.			A seabass of uncertain affinities.	
Sphyraena	S. cf. barracuda		A barracuda, potentially the modern great barracuda.	
Sphoeroides	S. hyperostosus		An extinct pufferfish.	
Stenotomus	S. cf. chrysops		A porgy, potentially the modern scup.	
Symphurus	S. sp.		A tonguefish.	
Tautoga	T. cf. onitis		A wrasse, potentially the modern tautog.	
Thunnus	T. thynnus		The modern Atlantic bluefin tuna.	
Thunnus	T. sp.		A tuna.	
Urophycis	U. tenuis		The modern white hake.	
Xiphias	X. gladius		The modern swordfish.	

=== Reptiles ===
==== Turtles ====
Based partly on Zug (2001):

Genus	Species	Locality	Notes	Images
Apalone	cf. A. sp.		A softshell turtle.	
Caretta	C. patriciae		An extinct relative of the loggerhead sea turtle.	
Chelonia	?C. sp.		A potential relative of the green sea turtle.	
Chrysemys	C. sp.		A painted turtle.	
"Geochelone (Caudochelys)"	"G." sp.		An extinct tortoise.	
Lepidochelys	L. sp.		A Ridley sea turtle.	
Procolpochelys	P. sp.		A sea turtle.	
Psephophorus	P. sp.		A relative of the leatherback turtle.	
Syllomus	S. aegyptiacus		A sea turtle.	

==== Crocodilians ====
Genus	Species	Locality	Notes	Images
Thecachampsa	T. antiqua	Lee Creek Mine	A gavialoid crocodilian, one of the northernmost Pliocene records of the genus.	

=== Birds ===
Based on Olson & Rasmussen (2001). An extremely high diversity of fossil birds, primarily known from isolated but diagnostic limb bones, is known from the formation. All specimens were collected from the Lee Creek Mine. Most taxonomic assignments were based on rough similarity to living species, hence the "aff." suffix to indicate similarities, and are not intended to be meant as direct taxonomic assignments.

==== Anseriformes ====
Genus	Species	Notes	Images
Anas	A. acuta	A dabbling duck similar to the northern pintail.	
Anas	A. platyrhynchos	A dabbling duck similar to the mallard.	
Anser	A. cf. arizonae	An extinct gray goose.	
Anserini indet.		A relative of gray geese.	
Aythya	A. aff. affinis	A diving duck similar to the lesser scaup.	
Branta	B. aff. bernicla	A black goose similar to the barnacle goose.	
Branta	B. minuscula	An extinct black goose.	
Bucephala	B. aff. albeola	A diving duck similar to the bufflehead.	
Bucephala	B. aff. clangula	A diving duck similar to the common goldeneye.	
Cygnus	C. aff. columbianus	A swan similar to the tundra swan.	
Histrionicus	H. aff. histrionicus	A relative of the harlequin duck.	
Mareca	M. americana	A dabbling duck similar to the American wigeon.	
Melanitta	M. aff. nigra	A sea duck similar to the black scoter.	
Melanitta	M. aff. perspicillata	A sea duck similar to the surf scoter.	
Mergus	M. aff. serrator	A sea duck similar to the common merganser.	
Somateria	S. sp.	A sea duck similar to the common eider.	
Somateria	S. aff. mollissima	A sea duck similar to the common eider.	
Spatula	S. clypeata	A dabbling duck similar to the northern shoveler.	
Spatula	S. discors	A dabbling duck similar to the blue-winged teal.	

==== Galliformes ====
Genus	Species	Notes	Images
Meleagris	M. sp.	A turkey.	

==== Phoenicopteriformes ====
Genus	Species	Notes	Images
Phoenicopterus	P. cf. floridanus	An extinct flamingo.	

==== Podicipediformes ====
Genus	Species	Notes	Images
Podiceps	P. aff. auritus	A grebe similar to the horned grebe.	

==== Gruiformes ====
Genus	Species	Notes	Images
Antigone	A. aff. antigone	A crane similar to the sarus crane.	
Grus	G. aff. americana	A crane similar to the whooping crane.	

==== Columbiformes ====
Genus	Species	Notes	Images
Ectopistes	E. aff. migratorius	A relative of the passenger pigeon.	

==== Accipitriformes ====
Genus	Species	Notes	Images
Accipitridae indet.		A hawk of uncertain affinities.	
Buteo	B. jamaicensis	A hawk similar to the red-tailed hawk.	
Buteo	?B. sp.	A hawk.	
Cathartidae indet.		A New World vulture of uncertain affinities.	
Neophrontops	?N. sp.	An Old World vulture.	
Pandion	P. sp.	A relative of the osprey.	

==== Ciconiiformes ====
Genus	Species	Notes	Images
Ciconia	C. sp.	A stork.	

==== Suliformes ====
Genus	Species	Notes	Images
Morus	M. avitus	An extinct gannet.	
Morus	M. atlanticus	An extinct gannet.	
Morus	M. peninsularis	An extinct gannet.	
Morus	M. loxostyla	An extinct gannet.	
Morus	M. sp.	An extinct gannet.	
Phalacrocorax	P. wetmorei	An extinct cormorant.	
Phalacrocorax	P. sp.	An extinct cormorant.	

==== Pelecaniformes ====
Genus	Species	Notes	Images
Ardea	A. aff. cinerea	A heron similar to the gray heron.	
Eudocimus	E. sp.	An ibis.	
Pelecanus	P. schreiberi	An extinct giant pelican, type locality of species.	

==== Procellariiformes ====
Genus	Species	Notes	Images
Ardenna	A. sp.	A shearwater.	
Ardenna	A. tenuirostris	A shearwater similar to the short-tailed shearwater.	
Ardenna	A. gravis	A shearwater similar to the great shearwater.	
?Bulweria sp.		A petrel.	
Calonectris	C. aff. diomedea	A shearwater similar to Scopoli's shearwater.	
Calonectris	C. borealis	A shearwater similar to Cory's shearwater.	
Calonectris	C. krantzi	An extinct shearwater.	
Pachyptila	P. sp.	A prion.	
Phoebastria	P. aff. albatrus	An albatross similar to the short-tailed albatross.	
Phoebastria	P. aff. immutabilis	An albatross similar to the Laysan albatross.	
Phoebastria	P. nigripes	An albatross similar to the black-footed albatross.	
Phoebastria	P. rexularum	An extinct albatross.	
Phoebastria	P. anglica	An extinct albatross.	
Procellaria	P. cf. parkinsoni	A petrel similar to the black petrel.	
Procellaria	P. cf. aequinoctialis	A petrel similar to the white-chinned petrel.	
Pterodroma	P. lessonii	A petrel similar to the white-headed petrel.	
Pterodromoides	P. minoricensis	An extinct petrel.	
Puffinus	P. cf. puffinus	A shearwater similar to the Manx shearwater.	
Puffinus	P. aff. pacificoides	A shearwater similar to the Saint Helena shearwater.	
Puffinus	P. lherminieri	A shearwater similar to the Sargasso shearwater.	
Puffinus	P. sp.	A shearwater.	
Puffinus	P. (Thyellodroma) sp.	A shearwater.	

==== Gaviiformes ====
Genus	Species	Notes	Images
Gavia	G. concinna	An extinct loon.	
Gavia	G. fortis	An extinct loon.	
Gavia	G. howardae	An extinct loon.	

==== Odontopterygiformes ====
Genus	Species	Notes	Images
Pelagornis	P. sp. 1.	A pseudotooth bird.	
Pelagornis	P. sp. 2	A pseudotooth bird.	

==== Charadriiformes ====
Genus	Species	Notes	Images
Aethiinae indet.		An auk of uncertain affinities.	
Alca	A. ausonia	An extinct auk related to the razorbill. Type locality of A. carolinensis, A. minor, and A. olsoni.	
Alca	A. carolinensis	An extinct auk related to the razorbill. Type locality of A. carolinensis, A. minor, and A. olsoni.	
Alca	A. minor	An extinct auk related to the razorbill. Type locality of A. carolinensis, A. minor, and A. olsoni.	
Alca	A. olsoni	An extinct auk related to the razorbill. Type locality of A. carolinensis, A. minor, and A. olsoni.	
Alca	A. aff. torda	An auk similar to the razorbill.	
Alca	A. sp.	An auk similar to the razorbill.	
Calidris	C. aff. melanotos	A sandpiper similar to the pectoral sandpiper.	
Cerorhinca	C. sp.	An auk similar to the rhinoceros auklet.	
Chroicocephalus	C. aff. ridibundus	A gull similar to the black-headed gull.	
Fratercula	F. aff. arctica	A puffin similar to the Atlantic puffin.	
Fratercula	F. aff. cirrhata	A puffin similar to the tufted puffin.	
Gallinago	G. media	A snipe similar to the great snipe.	
Gelochelidon	G. aff. nilotica	A tern similar to the gull-billed tern.	
Haematopus	H. aff. palliatus	An oystercatcher similar to the American oystercatcher.	
Haematopus	H. aff. ostralegus	An oystercatcher similar to the Eurasian oystercatcher.	
Haematopus	H. sp.	An oystercatcher.	
Hydrocoloeus	H. aff. minutus	A gull similar to the little gull.	
Larus	L. aff. argentatus	A gull similar to the herring gull.	
Larus	L. aff. delawarensis	A gull similar to the ring-billed gull.	
Larus	L. sp.	A gull	
Leucophaeus	L. aff. atricilla	A gull similar to the laughing gull.	
Numenius	N. aff. borealis	A curlew similar to the Eskimo curlew.	
Pinguinus	P. alfrednewtoni	A large flightless auk related to the great auk. Type locality of species.	
Pluvialis	P. aff. squatarola	A plover similar to the black-bellied plover.	
Stercorarius	S. aff. longicaudus	A skua similar to the long-tailed jaeger.	
Stercorarius	S. aff. parasiticus	A skua similar to the parasitic jaeger.	
Stercorarius	S. aff. pomarinus	A skua similar to the pomarine jaeger.	
Stercorarius	S. sp.	A skua.	
Thalasseus	T. aff. maximus	A tern similar to the royal tern.	
Tringa	T. aff. ochropus	A sandpiper similar to the green sandpiper.	

==== Passeriformes ====
Genus	Species	Notes	Images
Corvus	C. aff. ossifragus	A crow similar to the fish crow.	

=== Mammals ===
==== Proboscideans ====
Genus	Species	Notes	Images
Gomphotherium	G. cf. euhypodon	A gomphothere.	
Gomphotherium	G. sp.	A gomphothere.	

==== Xenarthrans ====
Genus	Species	Notes	Images
Folivora indet. (=Phyllophaga indet)		A ground sloth of uncertain affinities.	

==== Carnivorans ====
Genus	Species	Locality	Notes	Images
Auroraphoca	A. atlantica	Lee Creek Mine	An earless seal. Type locality of genus and species.	
Borophagus	B. cf. dudleyi	Lee Creek Mine	A bone-crushing dog.	
Borophagus	B. cf. orc	Lee Creek Mine	A bone-crushing dog.	
Borophagus	B. sp.	Lee Creek Mine	A bone-crushing dog.	
Callophoca	C. obscura	Lee Creek Mine, Meherrin River, Superior Stone Company Quarry	An earless seal.	
Felidae indet.		Lee Creek Mine	A cat of uncertain affinities.	
Gryphoca	G. similis	Lee Creek Mine	An earless seal.	
Hadrokirus	H. novotini	Meherrin River	An earless seal. Type locality of species.	
Homiphoca	?H. capensis	Lee Creek Mine	A monachine earless seal. Type locality of H. murfreesi.	
Homiphoca	H. murfreesi	Meherrin River	A monachine earless seal. Type locality of H. murfreesi.	
Leptophoca	L. lenis	Meherrin River	An earless seal. Type locality of species.	
Lobodontini indet.		Meherrin River	A relative of Antarctic seals, of uncertain affinities.	
Mesotaria	M. ambigua	Lee Creek Mine	An earless seal.	
Monachinae indet.		Lee Creek Mine	A monachine seal of uncertain affinities.	
Ontocetus	O. emmonsi	Multiple	An odobenid related to the walrus. Type locality for genus and species.	
Paleophoca	P. nystii	Lee Creek Mine	An earless seal.	
Phocanella	P. pumila	Lee Creek Mine	An earless seal. Type locality of species.	
Platyphoca	P. vulgaris	Lee Creek Mine	An earless seal.	
Sarcodectes	S. magnus	Lee Creek Mine, Meherrin River	An earless seal. Type locality of genus and species.	
Ursidae indet.		Lee Creek Mine	A bear of uncertain affinities.	

==== Perissodactyls ====
Genus	Species	Locality	Notes	Images
Nannippus	N. lenticularis	Lee Creek Mine	An equid.	
Neohipparion	N. eurystyle	Lee Creek Mine	An equid.	
Pseudhipparion	P. simpsoni	Lee Creek Mine	An equid.	
Rhinocerotidae indet.		Lee Creek Mine	A rhinoceros.	
Tapirus	T. sp.	Lee Creek Mine	A tapir.	

==== Artiodactyls ====
===== Terrestrial artiodactyls =====
Genus	Species	Locality	Notes	Images
Antilocapridae indet.		Lee Creek Mine	An antilocaprid of uncertain affinities.	
Camelidae indet.		Lee Creek Mine	A camelid of uncertain affinities.	
cf. Hemiauchenia	cf. H. sp.	Lee Creek Mine	A lamine camelid.	
Kyptoceras	K. amatorum	Lee Creek Mine	A protoceratid.	
Pediomeryx	P. sp.	Lee Creek Mine	A dromomerycid.	
Ruminantia indet.		Lee Creek Mine	A ruminant of uncertain affinities.	
Tayassuidae indet.		Lee Creek Mine	A peccary of uncertain affinities.	

===== Cetaceans =====
Based on:

Genus	Species	Locality	Notes	Images
Aprixokogia	A. kelloggi		A kogiid sperm whale. Type locality of genus and species.	
Auroracetus	A. bakerae		A pontoporiid dolphin. Type locality of genus and species.	
Balaena	B. palaeatlantica		A relative of the bowhead whale. Type locality of species.	
Balaena	?B. prisca		An alleged bowhead whale, but more likely a cetothere.	
Balaena	B. ricei		A relative of the bowhead whale. Type locality of species.	
Balaena	B. sp.			
Balaenoptera	B. acutorostrata		The modern minke whale.	
Balaenoptera	B. borealina		A rorqual whale.	
Balaenotus	B. sp.		A balaenid whale.	
Balaenula	B. sp.		A balaenid whale.	
Bohaskaia	B. monodontoides		A monodontid. Type locality of genus and species.	
Cetotheriinae indet.			A cetothere.	
Cetotherium	C. crassangulum		A cetothere.	
Cetotherium	C. polyporum		A cetothere.	
Delphinapterus	D. orcinus		A relative of the beluga whale.	
Delphinapterus	D. sp.		A relative of the beluga whale.	
Delphinidae indet.			An oceanic dolphin.	
Delphinus	D. sp.		A relative of the common dolphin.	
Globicephala	G. sp.		A pilot whale.	
Gricetoides	G. aurorae		An eschrichtiid relative of the gray whale. Type locality of genus and species.	
Herpetocetus	H. sendaicus		A cetothere.	
Herpetocetus	H. transatlanticus		A cetothere.	
cf. Kogia	cf. K. breviceps		A kogiid reminiscent of the pygmy sperm whale.	
Kogiidae indet.			A large kogiid of uncertain affinities.	
cf. Kogiopsis	cf. K. floridana		A kogiid.	
Lagenorhynchus	L. harmatuki		A white-sided dolphin. Type locality of species.	
Lagenorhynchus	L. sp.			
Megaptera	M. sp.		A relative of the humpback whale.	
Mesoplodon	M. longirostris		A beaked whale.	
Mesoteras	M. kerrianus		A baleen whale. Type locality of genus and species.	
cf. Monodon	M. sp.		A potential relative of the narwhal.	
Ninoziphius	N. platyrostris		A beaked whale.	
Orycterocetus	O. cornutidens		A physeterid.	
Orycterocetus	O. quadratidens		A physeterid.	
cf. Physeter	cf. P. macrocephalus		A physeterid, potentially the modern sperm whale.	
Physeteridae indet.			A physeterid.	
cf. Physeterula	cf. P. dubusi		A physeterid.	
cf. Plesiocetus	cf. P. sp.		A rorqual.	
Pliopontos	P. littoralis		A pontoporiid dolphin.	
Pseudorca	P. sp		A relative of the false killer whale.	
cf. Pontoporia	cf. P. sp.		A pontoporiid dolphin.	
cf. Scaldicetus	cf S. sp.		A physeterid.	
Stenella	S. rayi		An oceanic dolphin.	
Stenella	S. sp.		An oceanic dolphin.	
Tursiops	T. sp.		A bottlenose dolphin.	
Ziphius	Z. cavirostris		The modern Cuvier's beaked whale.	

== Other Organisms ==
- Foraminifera, including the biostratigraphic marker species Dentoglobigerina altispira (see Globigerinida), Sphaeroidinellopsis, and Globorotalia puncticulata

== Gallery ==
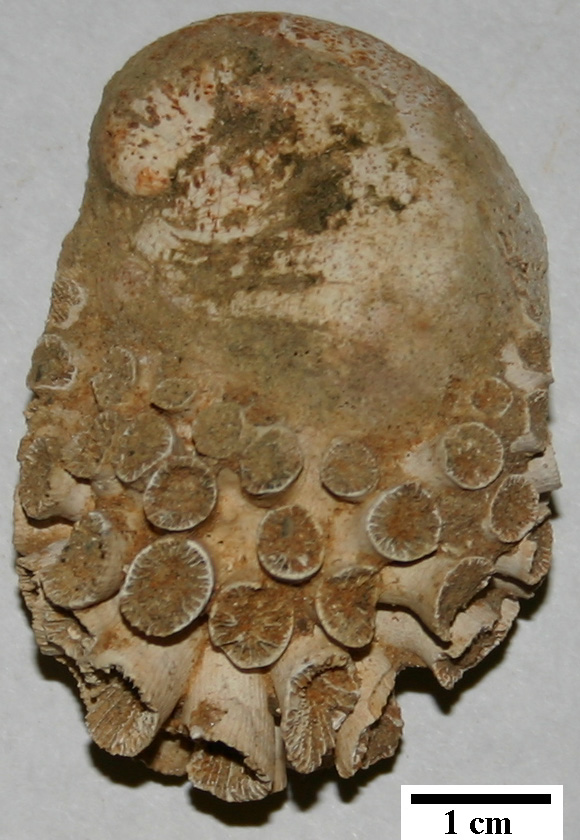
Coral growing on a Crepidula sp. (slipper snail) from the Yorktown Formation

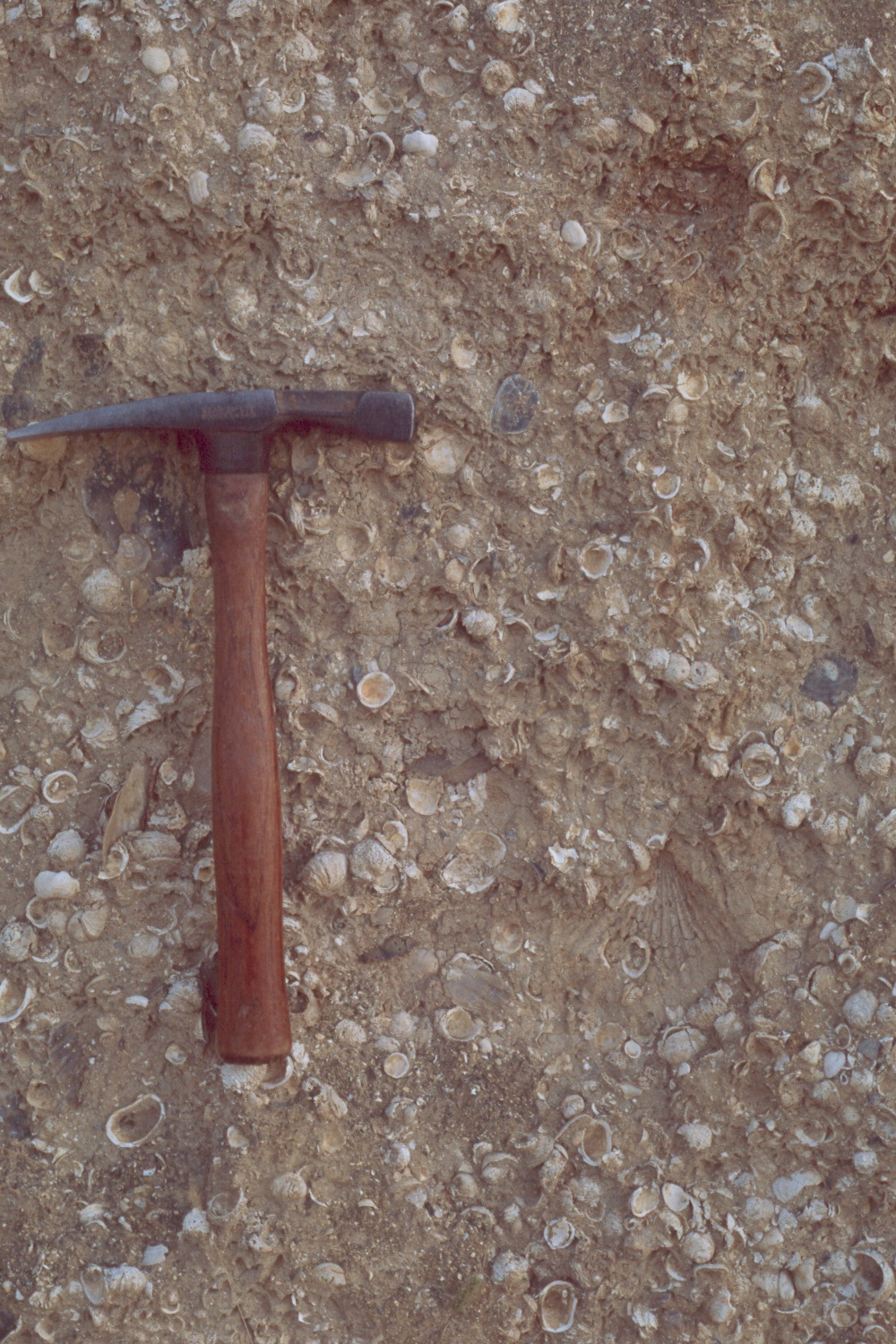
Rushmere Member of the Yorktown Formation, with abundant Chama bivalves

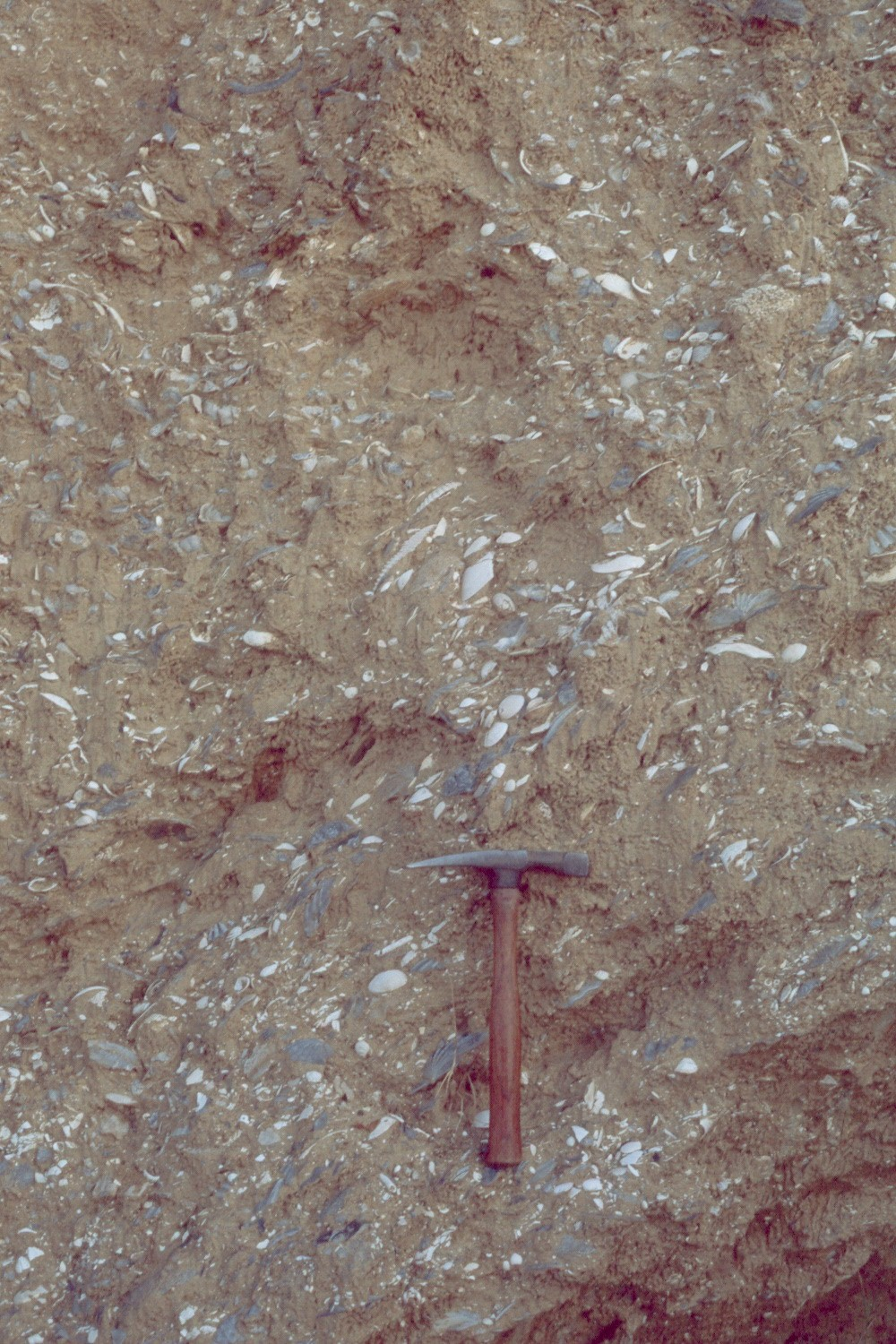
Sunken Meadow Member of the Yorktown Formation

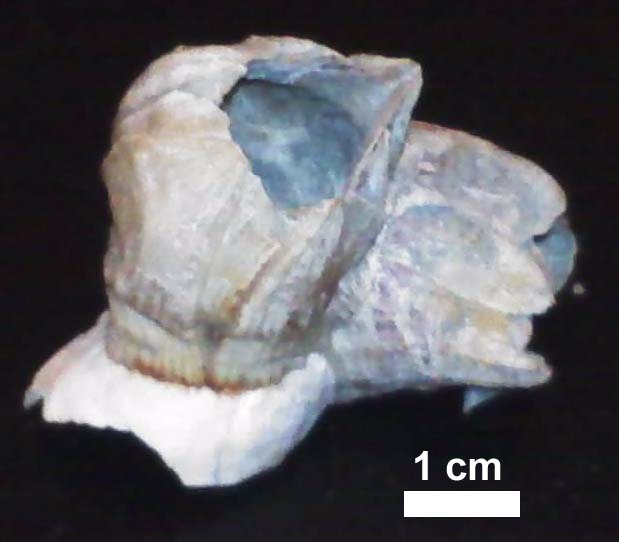
Balanus sp. (barnacles) from Carters Grove Bluffs outcrop, growing on a bivalve
