= Brotula ordwayi =

Conservation status
- Least Concern (IUCN 3.1)

Scientific classification
- Kingdom: Animalia
- Phylum: Chordata
- Class: Actinopterygii
- Order: Ophidiiformes
- Genus: Brotula
- Species: B. ordwayi

Binomial name
- Brotula ordwayi Hildebrand & Barton (1949)

Species of cusk-eel

Brotula ordwayi is a species from the genus Brotula. The genus Brotula comes from the family Ophidiidae (cusk eels). Their body is a dark shade of green and brown spots. Their fins are green with brown on the ends. The eye color of the Brotula ordwayi is brown. Their body has a length of about 20 inches (about 50 cm) and is not recorded to surpass this.

The most recent research done on the Brotula ordwayi occurred in 1995 by Colombian researchers. Brotula ordwayi as a species has only been found in the Pacific ocean towards Costa Rica, Gorgona (Colombia) and Talara (Perú) and Mexico. It is often mistaken for the Brotula barbata (a.k.a. the bearded barbata).
