= Gilbert's garden eel =

Conservation status
- Least Concern (IUCN 3.1)

Scientific classification
- Kingdom: Animalia
- Phylum: Chordata
- Class: Actinopterygii
- Order: Anguilliformes
- Family: Congridae
- Genus: Ariosoma
- Species: A. gilberti

Binomial name
- Ariosoma gilberti (Ogilby, 1898)

Synonyms
- Congrellus gilberti Ogilby, 1898

Species of fish

The Gilbert's garden eel (Ariosoma gilberti), also known as the Gilbert's conger and the sharpnose conger, is an eel in the family Congridae (conger/garden eels). It was described by James Douglas Ogilby in 1898, originally under the genus Congrellus. It is a tropical, marine eel which is known from the eastern central and southeastern Pacific Ocean, including the Gulf of California, Costa Rica, El Salvador, Ecuador, Guatemala, Mexico, Honduras, Nicaragua, Panama, and Colombia. It is a benthic and nocturnal species, and inhabits sand flats in reefs, bays and coves at a depth range of 1–100 metres. It burrows into sand during the day and emerges to forage during the night. Males can reach a maximum total length of 27 centimetres.

The Gilbert's garden eel is preyed upon by the Pacific bearded brotula (Brotula clarkae, a Cusk-eel). Due to its widespread distribution, lack of known threats, and lack of observed population decline, the IUCN redlist currently lists the Gilbert's garden eel as Least Concern.

Named in honor of ichthyologist and fisheries biologist Charles Henry Gilbert (1859–1928), who reported this species as A. balearicum in 1891 but noted variations in his specimens
