= Gavia howardae =

Gavia howardae Temporal range: Piacenzian

Scientific classification
- Kingdom: Animalia
- Phylum: Chordata
- Class: Aves
- Order: Gaviiformes
- Family: Gaviidae
- Genus: Gavia
- Species: †G. howardae

Binomial name
- †Gavia howardae Brodkorb, 1953

Extinct species of loon

Gavia howardae is an extinct species of loon from the Piacenzian age from United States. Fossils of this bird were initially found in 1947 by Clifford Kennell in the San Diego Formation, California and were given a name in 1953 by Pierce Brodkorb. These first specimens consisted of humeri bones, which Brodkorb indicated based on the distal end of the humerus were a smaller species of the genus Gavia, with a possible relationship with the pacific loon (G. arctica). More specimens were collected from the same deposits covering the entirety of the wing, some more complete than others. Chandler (1990) described and published these new materials and found G. howardae to be related to the red-throated loon (G. stellata) instead. Additional material has been recovered from the Yorktown Formation, North Carolina where in addition more wing bones, there were also remains of the leg and shoulder regions. Based on the overall size of the remains, G. howardae was on average smaller than the red-throated loon, and one of the smallest species of Neogene loons from North America.
