= Gavia fortis =

Gavia fortis Temporal range: Zanclean

Scientific classification
- Kingdom: Animalia
- Phylum: Chordata
- Class: Aves
- Order: Gaviiformes
- Family: Gaviidae
- Genus: Gavia
- Species: †G. fortis

Binomial name
- †Gavia fortis Olson & Rasmussen, 2001

Extinct species of loon

Gavia fortis is an extinct species of loon from the Zanclean age from United States.

Fossils of this bird have mostly been found in the Yorktown Formation from North Carolina and two specimens recovered from the Bone Valley Formation in Florida. Remains of this species consist of mostly the bones that make up the wing, the synsacrum, legs, and feet. Olson & Rasmussen, who described the species in 2001, noted that the bones are markedly more robust, indicating that this is the third largest species of loon to have existed, after the common loon (G. immer) and the yellow-billed loon (G. adamsii). The authors believed G. fortis is closely related to the ancestor of both of the aforementioned extant species.
