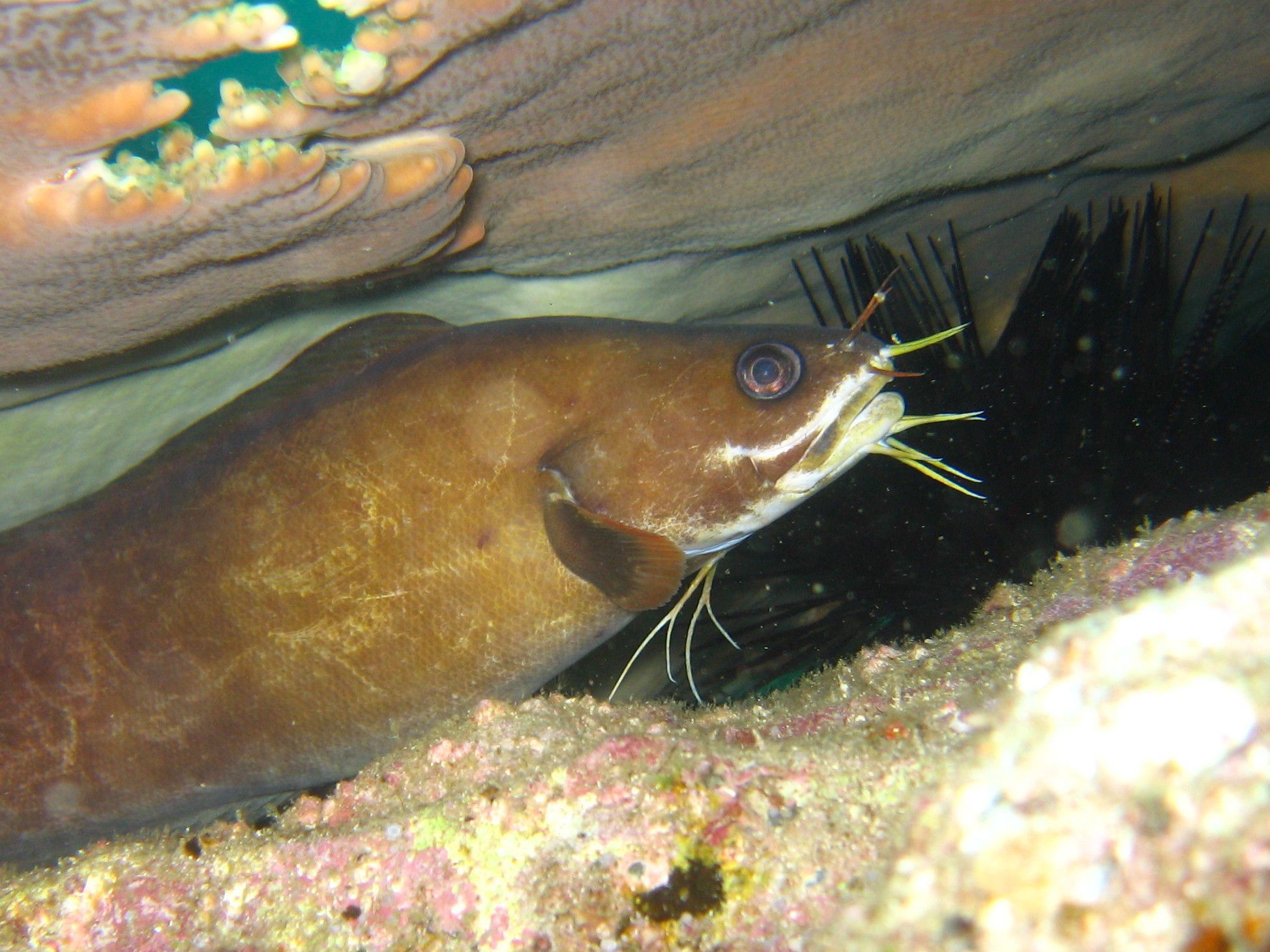

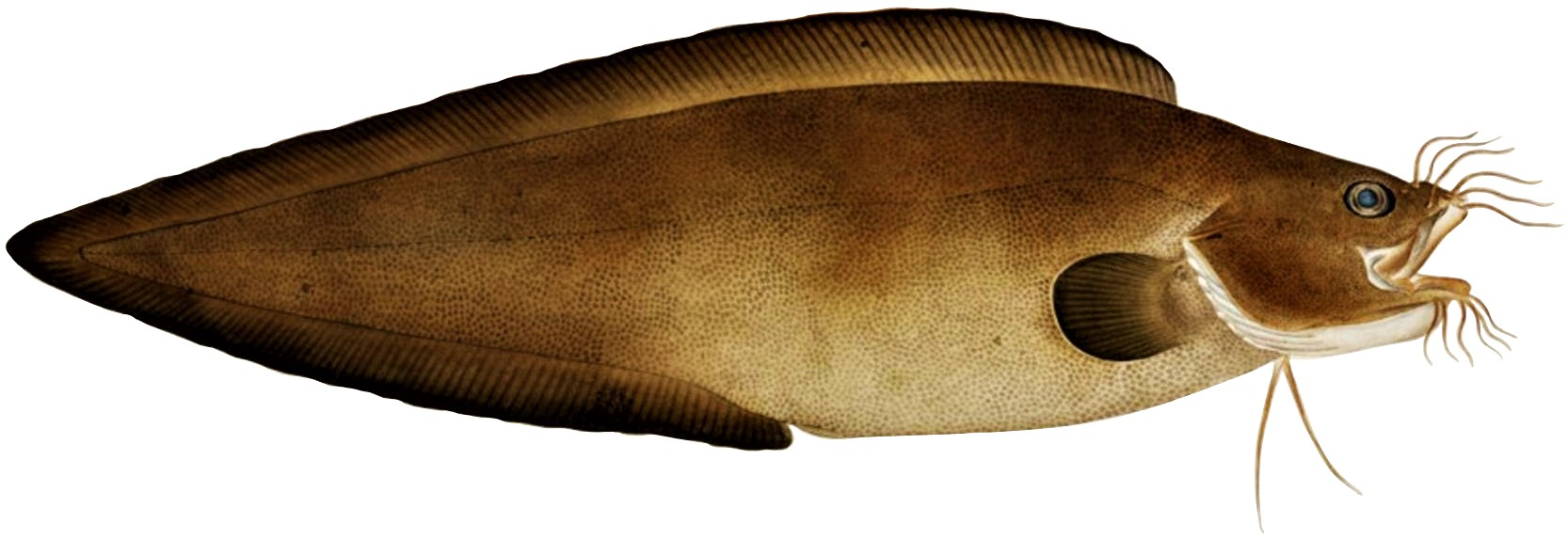
- Illustration

Conservation status
- Least Concern (IUCN 3.1)

Scientific classification
- Kingdom: Animalia
- Phylum: Chordata
- Class: Actinopterygii
- Division: Teleostei
- Order: Ophidiiformes
- Genus: Brotula
- Species: B. multibarbata

Binomial name
- Brotula multibarbata Temminck & Schlegel, 1847

Synonyms
- Brotula burbonensis Kaup, 1858; Brotula ensiformis Günther, 1862; Brotula multicirrata Vaillant & Sauvage, 1875; Brotula japonica Steindachner & Döderlein, 1887; Brotula ferruginosus (Tickell, 1888); Brotula marginalis Jenkins, 1901; Brotula formosae Jordan & Evermann, 1902; Brotula muelleri Günther, 1909; Brotula jayakari Günther, 1909; Brotula palmietensis J. L. B. Smith, 1935

= Brotula multibarbata =

Species of fish

Brotula multibarbata, commonly known as the goatbeard brotula, is a species of reef cusk eel in the family Ophidiidae. It is found throughout the Indo-Pacific region, typically at depths of around 300 meters.

== Description ==
Brotula multibarbata is an elongated fish with a soft usually brown or red brown body. It has a series of short barbels located around its head. These barbels function as sensory organs that allow it to detect prey in dim environments. It uses its slender body to move through narrow reef passages where it feeds in relative secrecy. Due to its nocturnal behavior and deep-water habitat, Brotula multibarbata is rarely seen by divers or researchers. Even in ideal conditions with high visibility, the species remains hidden for much of the day.

== Distribution and habitat ==
The species has been recorded in various locations across the Indo-Pacific, including the waters around the Cook Islands, Hawai'i, Japan and the Red Sea. It often shelters in rocky outcrops that provide numerous small holes and crevices that it can hide in.
