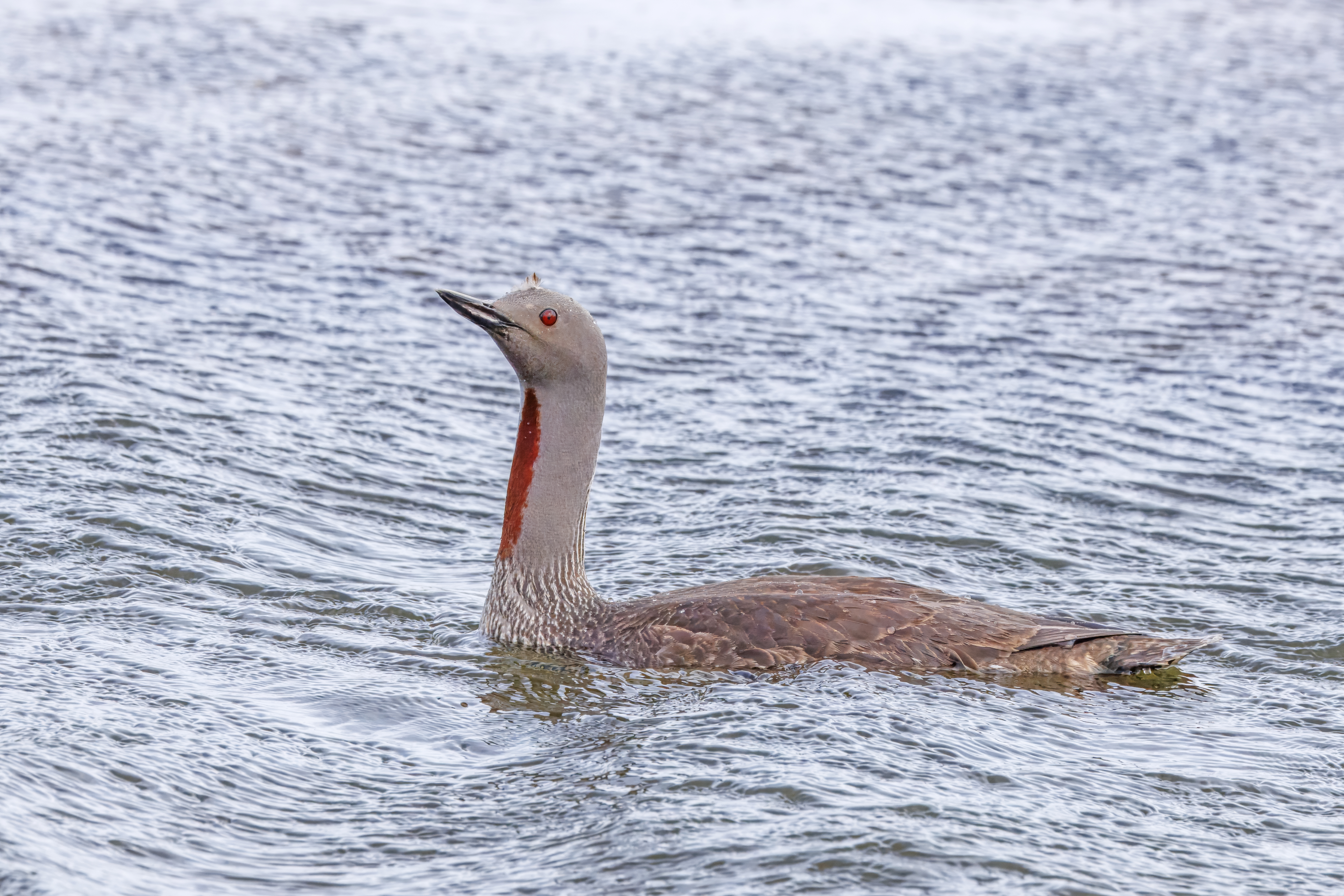
- Adult in breeding plumage in Iceland

Conservation status
- Least Concern (IUCN 3.1)

Scientific classification
- Kingdom: Animalia
- Phylum: Chordata
- Class: Aves
- Order: Gaviiformes
- Family: Gaviidae
- Genus: Gavia
- Species: G. stellata

Binomial name
- Gavia stellata (Pontoppidan, 1763)
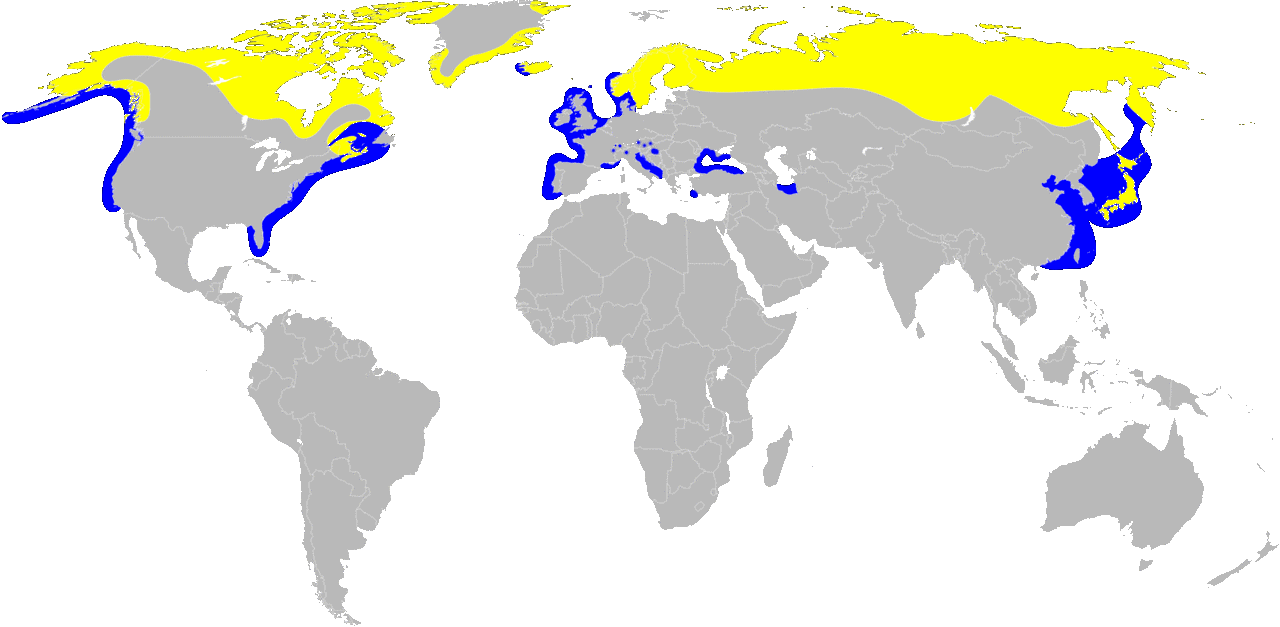
- Breeding summer visitor Winters at sea or Great Lakes

Synonyms
- Colymbus stellatus Pontoppidan, 1763; Colymbus lumme Brünnich, 1764; Colymbus septentrionalis Linnaeus, 1766; Gavia lumme Forster, 1788; Colymbus mulleri Brehm, 1826; Urinator lumme Stejneger, 1882

Audio
- Song, recorded in Loch Gowan, Scotland

= Red-throated loon =

Migratory aquatic bird found in the northern hemisphere

The red-throated loon (North America) or red-throated diver (Britain and Ireland) (Gavia stellata) is a migratory aquatic bird found in the Northern Hemisphere. The most widely distributed member of the loon or diver family, it breeds primarily in Arctic regions, and it winters in northern coastal waters. Ranging from 55 to 67 centimetres (22 to 26 in) in length, the red-throated loon is the smallest and lightest of the world's loons. In winter, it is a nondescript bird, greyish above, fading to white below. During the breeding season, it acquires the distinctive reddish throat patch, which is the basis for its common name. Fish form the bulk of its diet, though amphibians, invertebrates, and plant material are sometimes eaten as well. A monogamous species, red-throated loons form long-term pair bonds. Both members of the pair help to build the nest, incubate the eggs (generally two per clutch), and feed the hatched young.

The red-throated loon has a large global population and a significant global range, though some populations are declining. Oil spills, habitat degradation, pollution, and fishing nets are among the major threats this species faces. Natural predators—including various gull species, and both red and Arctic foxes, will take eggs and young. The species is protected by international treaties.

== Taxonomy and etymology ==
First described by Danish naturalist Erik Pontoppidan in 1763, the red-throated loon is a monotypic species with no distinctive subspecies despite its large Holarctic range.

Pontoppidan initially placed the species in the now-defunct genus Colymbus, which contained grebes as well as loons. By 1788, German naturalist Johann Reinhold Forster realized that grebes and loons were different enough to warrant separate genera, and moved the red-throated loon (along with all other loon species) to its present genus.

Its relationship to the four other loon species is complex; although all belong to the same genus, it differs from the others in terms of morphology, behaviour, ecology and breeding biology and may be the sister group to all other species in the genus. Analysis of molecular data together with the fossil record suggests the lineage of the red-throated loon diverged from that giving rise to the other loon species around 21.4 million years ago in the Miocene, and that it may be most closely related to the fossil Pliocene species Gavia howardae. The red-throated loon is thought to have evolved in the Palearctic, and then to have expanded into the Nearctic.

The genus name Gavia comes from the Latin for "sea mew", as used by ancient Roman naturalist Pliny the Elder. The specific epithet stellata is Latin for "set with stars" or "starry", and refers to the bird's speckled back in its non-breeding plumage. Members of the family Gavidae are known as loons in North America and divers in Great Britain and Ireland. The International Ornithological Congress uses the name red-throated loon for this species. "Diver" refers to the family's underwater method of hunting for prey, while "red-throated" is a straightforward reference to the bird's most distinctive breeding plumage feature. The word "loon" is thought to have derived from the Swedish lom, the Old Norse or Icelandic lómr, or the Old Dutch loen, all of which mean "lame" or "clumsy", and is a probable reference to the difficulty that all loons have in moving about on land. A local name from Willapa Harbor, Washington, was Quaker loon.

== Description ==
Like the other members of its genus, the red-throated loon is well adapted to its aquatic environment: its dense bones help it to submerge, its legs—in their set-back position—provide excellent propulsion, and its body is long and streamlined. Even its sharply pointed bill may help its underwater streamlining. Its feet are large, its front three toes are fully webbed, and its tarsus is flattened, which reduces drag and allows the leg to move easily through the water.

The red-throated loon is the smallest and lightest of the world's loon species, ranging from 53 to 69 cm (21 to 27 in) in length (Note: By convention, length is measured from the tip of the bill to the tip of the tail on a dead bird (or skin) laid on its back.) with a 91–120 cm (36–47 in) wingspan, and weighing 1–2.7 kg (2.2–6.0 lb). Like all loons, it is long-bodied and short-necked, with its legs set far back on its body. The sexes are similar in appearance, although males tend to be slightly larger and heavier than females. In breeding plumage, the adult has a dark grey head and neck (with narrow black and white stripes on the back of the neck), a triangular red throat patch, white underparts, and a dark grey-brown mantle. It is the only loon with an all-dark back in breeding plumage. The non-breeding plumage is drabber with the chin, foreneck, and much of the face white, the top of the head and back of the neck grey, and considerable white speckling on the dark mantle. Its iris is carmine-red to burgundy in colour, its legs are black on the outer half and pale on the inner half, and the webs of its feet are pinkish-brown, with darker margins.

Its bill is thin, straight, and sharp, and often held at an uptilted angle. One of the bird's North American folk names is pegging-awl loon, a reference to its sharply pointed bill, which resembles a sailmaker's awl (a tool also known as a "pegging awl" in New England). Though the colour of the bill changes from black in summer to pale grey in winter, the timing of the colour change does not necessarily correspond to that of the bird's overall plumage change. The nostrils are narrow slits located near the base of the bill.

When it first emerges from its egg, the young red-throated loon is covered with fine soft down feathers. Primarily dark brown to dark grey above, it is slightly paler on the sides of its head and neck, as well as on its throat, chest, and flanks, with a pale grey lower breast and belly. Within weeks, this first down is replaced by a second, paler set of down feathers, which are in turn replaced by developing juvenile feathers. The juvenile's plumage is similar to that of the adult, though with a few distinguishing features. It has a darker forehead and neck, with heavy speckling on the sides of the neck and the throat. Its back is browner and less speckled, and its underparts are tinged with brown. Its eyes are reddish-brown, and its beak is a pale grey. Though some young birds hold this plumage until mid-winter, many quickly become virtually indistinguishable from adults, except for their paler bills.

In flight, the red-throated loon has a distinctive profile; its small feet do not project far past the end of its body, its head and neck droop below the horizontal (giving the flying bird a distinctly hunchbacked shape) and its thin wings are angled back. It has a quicker, deeper wingbeat than do other loons.

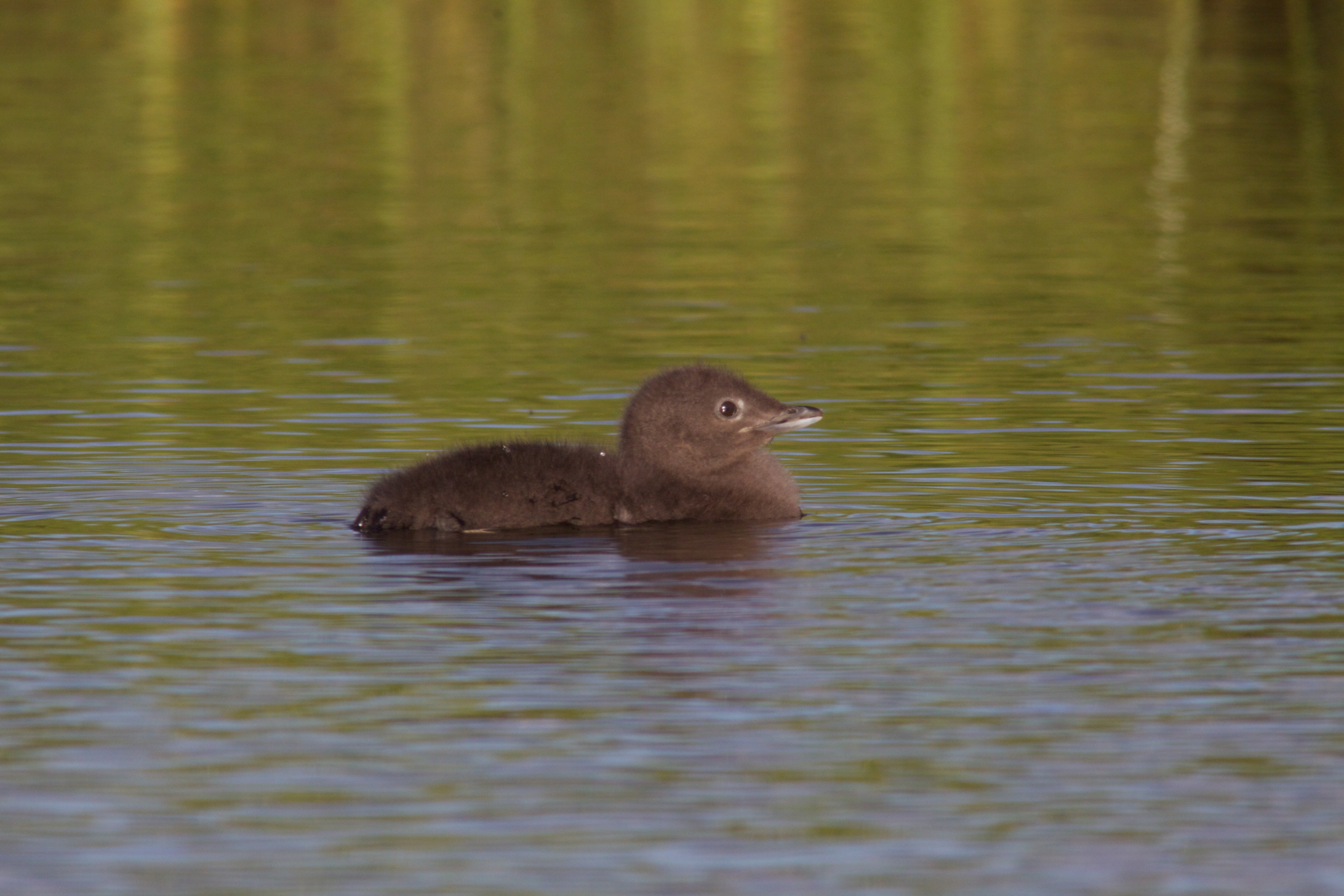
juvenile

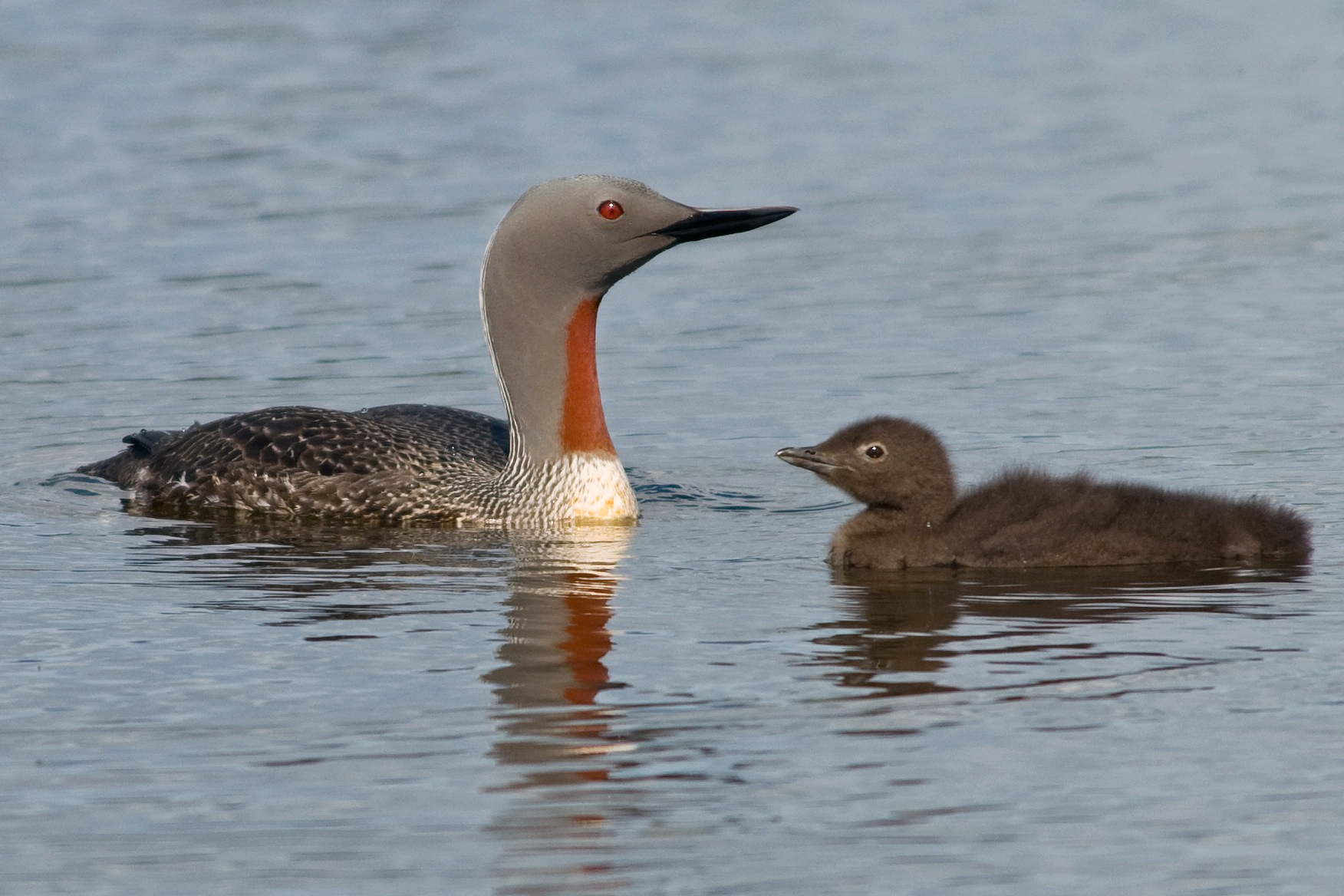
Adult in breeding plumage with juvenile

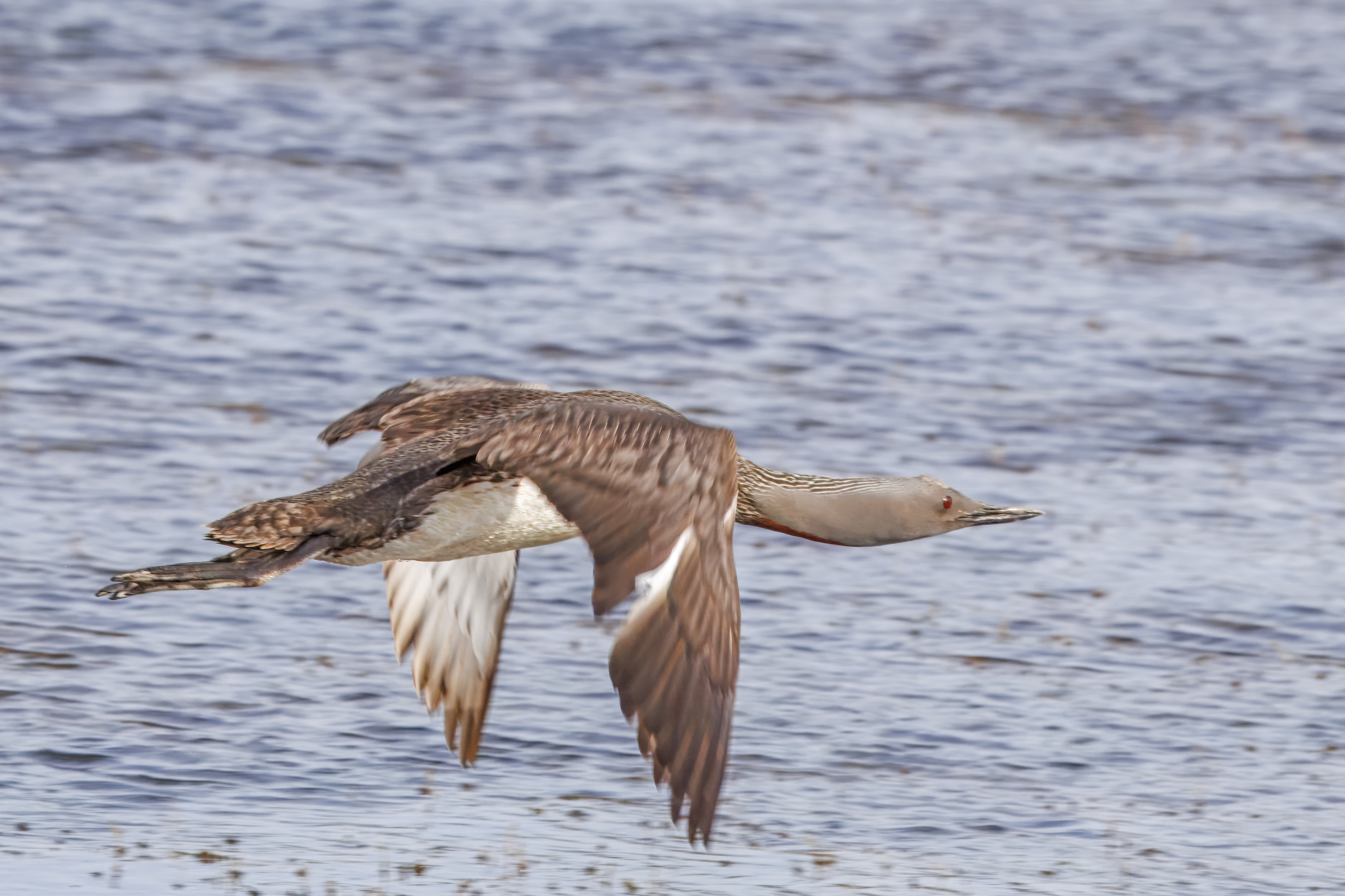
in breeding plumage
Iceland

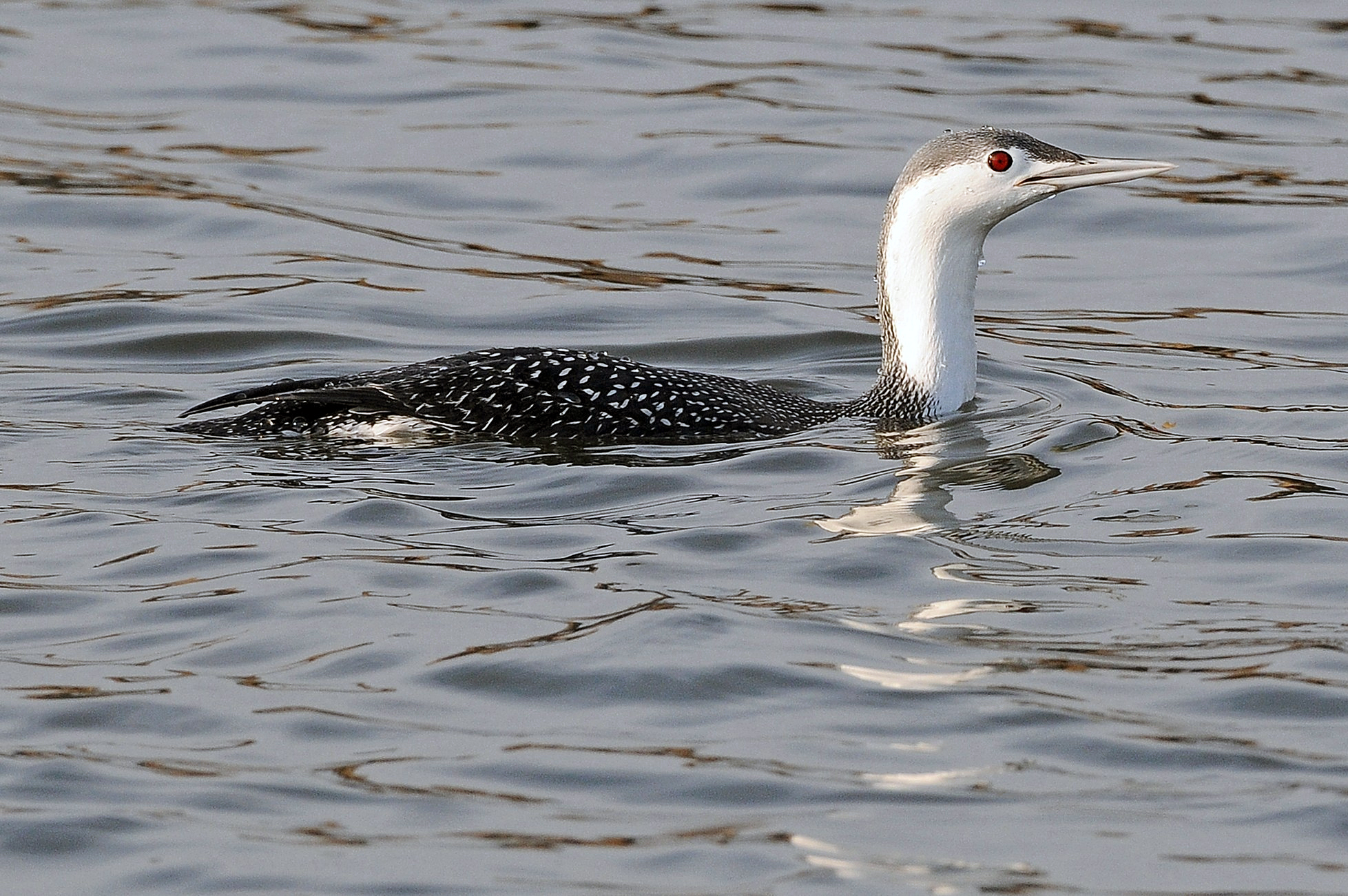
in non-breeding plumage: the speckled back gives the bird its specific name

=== Voice ===
Song, recorded in Loch Gowan, Scotland

The adult red-throated loon has a number of vocalisations, which are used in different circumstances. In flight, when passing conspecifics or circling its own pond, it gives a series of rapid yet rhythmic goose-like cackles—kaa-kaa-kaa or kak-kak-kak, at roughly five calls per second. Its warning call, if disturbed by humans or onshore predators, is a short croaking bark. A low-pitched moaning call, used primarily as a contact call between mates and between parents and young, but also during copulation, is made with the bill closed. The species also has a short wailing call—aarOOao...aarOOao...—which descends slightly in pitch and lasts about a second; due to strong harmonics surrounding the primary pitch, this meowing call is more musical than its other calls. Another call—a harsh, pulsed cooing that rises and falls in pitch, and is typically repeated up to 10 times in a row—is used in territorial encounters and pair-bonding, and by parent birds encouraging their young to move on land between bodies of water. Known as the "long call", it is often given in duet, which is unusual among the loons; the female's contribution is longer and softer than her mate's.

Young have a shrill closed-bill call, which they use in begging and to contact their parents. They also have a long call used in response to (and similar to that of) the long call of adults.

=== Similar species ===
At medium to close range, an adult red-throated loon in either breeding or non-breeding plumage is usually easily recognised. However, in certain light conditions, at certain times in its moulting cycle, or at greater distances, it may be mistaken for another species—most commonly the black-throated loon, but also occasionally the great crested grebe. It shows more white on the head and neck than does the black-throated loon, and—provided it is not sitting low in the water—tends to show more white on the flanks as well. If it is sitting lower in the water, so that the white on the flanks is reduced to a patch on the rear flank (thus resembling the pattern of the black-throated loon), that patch tends to be less clearly defined than the comparative patch on the black-throated.

== Habitat and distribution ==
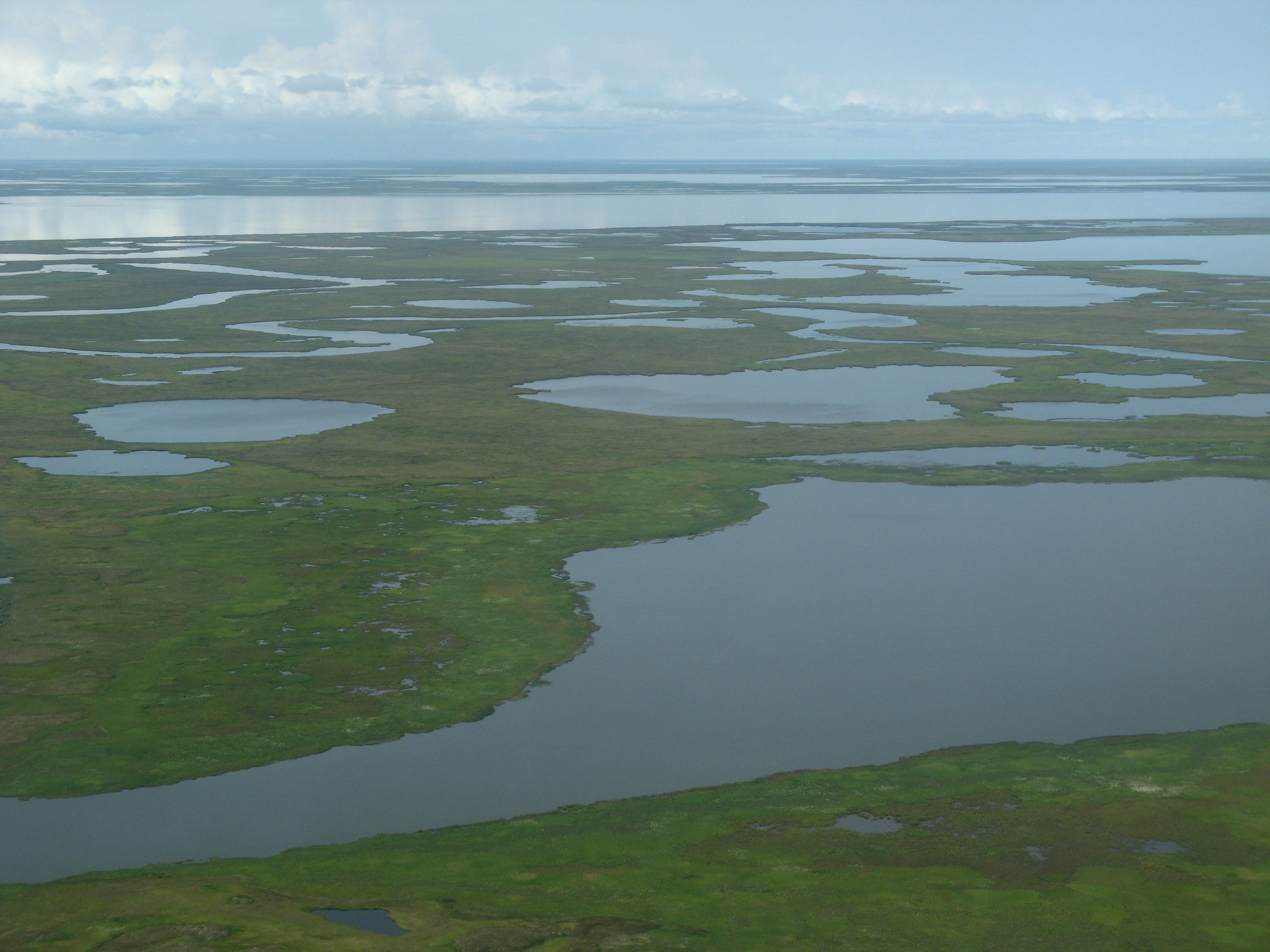
The red-throated loon breeds primarily in coastal tundra, often on very small lakes.

In contrast to other loons, its main fishing grounds are not the breeding lake, but larger lakes or the sea. Several nests close to each other may occur in the same breeding lake.

The red-throated loon breeds primarily in the Arctic regions of northern Eurasia and North America (generally north of 50°N latitude), and winters in northern coastal waters, sometimes in groups of considerable size. More than 4,400 spend the winter in a loose concentration on the eastern part of the German Bight, for example. Unlike other loons, it regularly uses very small freshwater lakes as breeding sites. Its small size renders it more versatile, but it is less able to feed on deeper prey. The increase in size and diversity of the remaining species of loons suggests that the benefits of larger size outweigh the limitations.

In North America, it winters regularly along both coasts, ranging as far south as the Baja California Peninsula and the Gulf of California in north-western Mexico; it has been recorded as a vagrant in the interior Mexican state of Hidalgo. Some of its folk names in north-eastern North America—including cape race, cape brace, cape drake and cape racer, as well as corruptions such as scapegrace—originated from its abundance around Cape Race, Newfoundland. In Europe, it breeds in Iceland, northern Scotland, north-western Ireland (only a few pairs), Scandinavia and northern Russia, and winters along the coast as far south as parts of Spain; it also regularly occurs along major inland waterways, including the Mediterranean, Aegean and Black Seas, as well as large rivers, lakes and reservoirs. It has occurred as a vagrant as far south as Morocco, Tunisia and the Gambia. In Asia, it breeds in the northern stretches of Siberia, and winters along the Pacific coast as far south as China, Japan and Taiwan. It has occurred as a vagrant in Mongolia.

== Behaviour ==
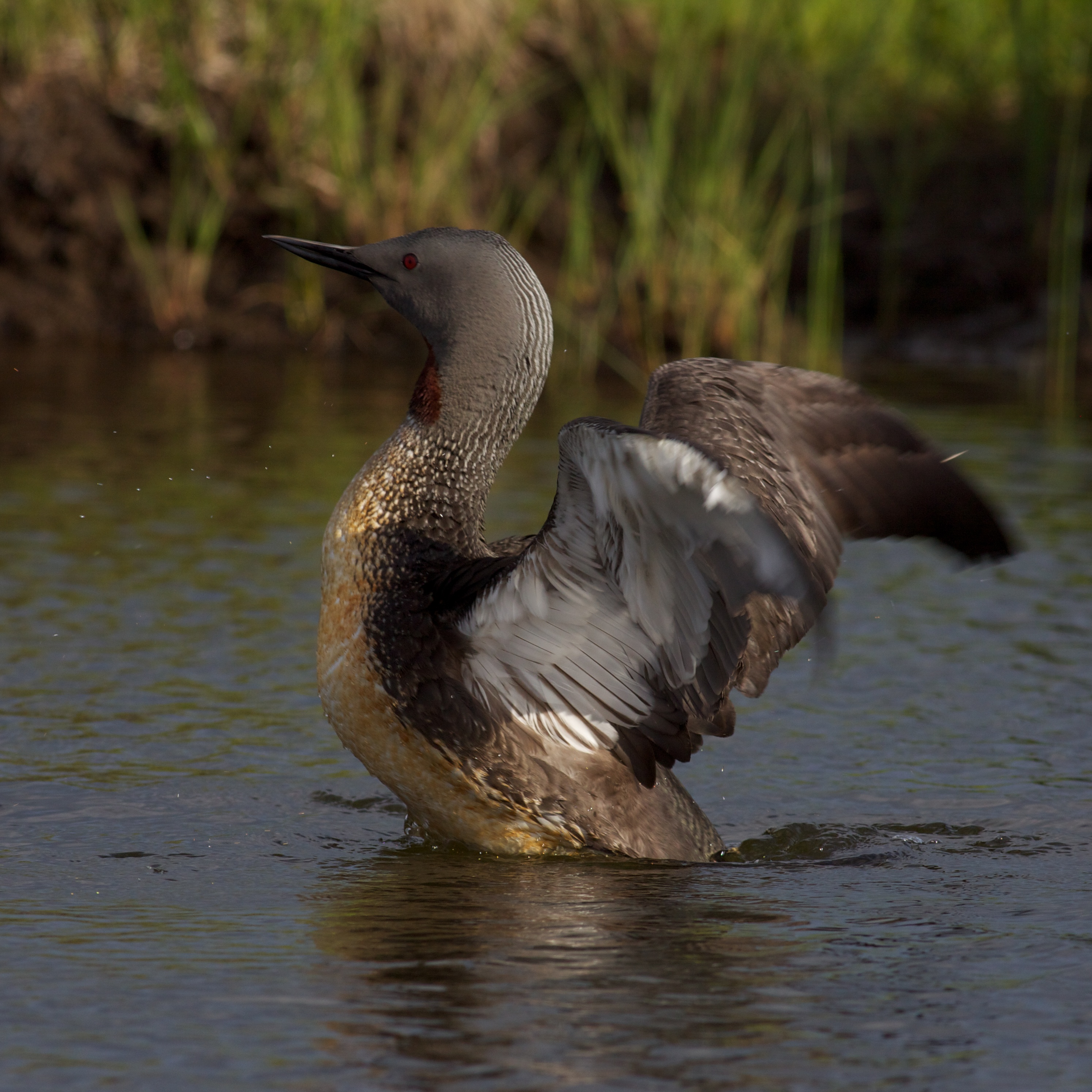
Among the loons, the red-throated loon is exceptional in its ability to take off from very small bodies of water.

Because its feet are located so far back on its body, the red-throated loon is quite clumsy walking on land, but it can use its feet to shove itself forward on its breast. Young use this method of covering ground when moving from their breeding pools to larger bodies of water, including rivers and the sea. It is the only species of loon able to take off directly from land. If frightened, it may submerge until only its head or bill shows above the surface of the water. It differs from other loons by nesting in small lakes but feeding in larger lakes or the sea. The nesting lake may host several nests, close to each other, with much agonistic behavior among pairs. This territorial behavior is performed pairwise, with vocalisation (long call, plesiosur race).

The red-throated loon is a diurnal migrant, which travels singly or in loose groups, often high above the water. In eastern North America (and possibly elsewhere), it tends to migrate near the coast rather than farther offshore; Siberian populations travel for hundreds of miles over land en route to their southern European wintering grounds. It is a strong flier, and has been clocked at speeds between 75 and 78 kilometres per hour (47 and 48 mph). Like all members of its family, the red-throated loon goes through a simultaneous wing moult, losing all its flight feathers at once and becoming flightless for a period of three to four weeks. Unlike other loons—which undergo this moult in late winter—the red-throated loon loses its ability to fly sometime between late summer and late autumn.

=== Food and feeding ===
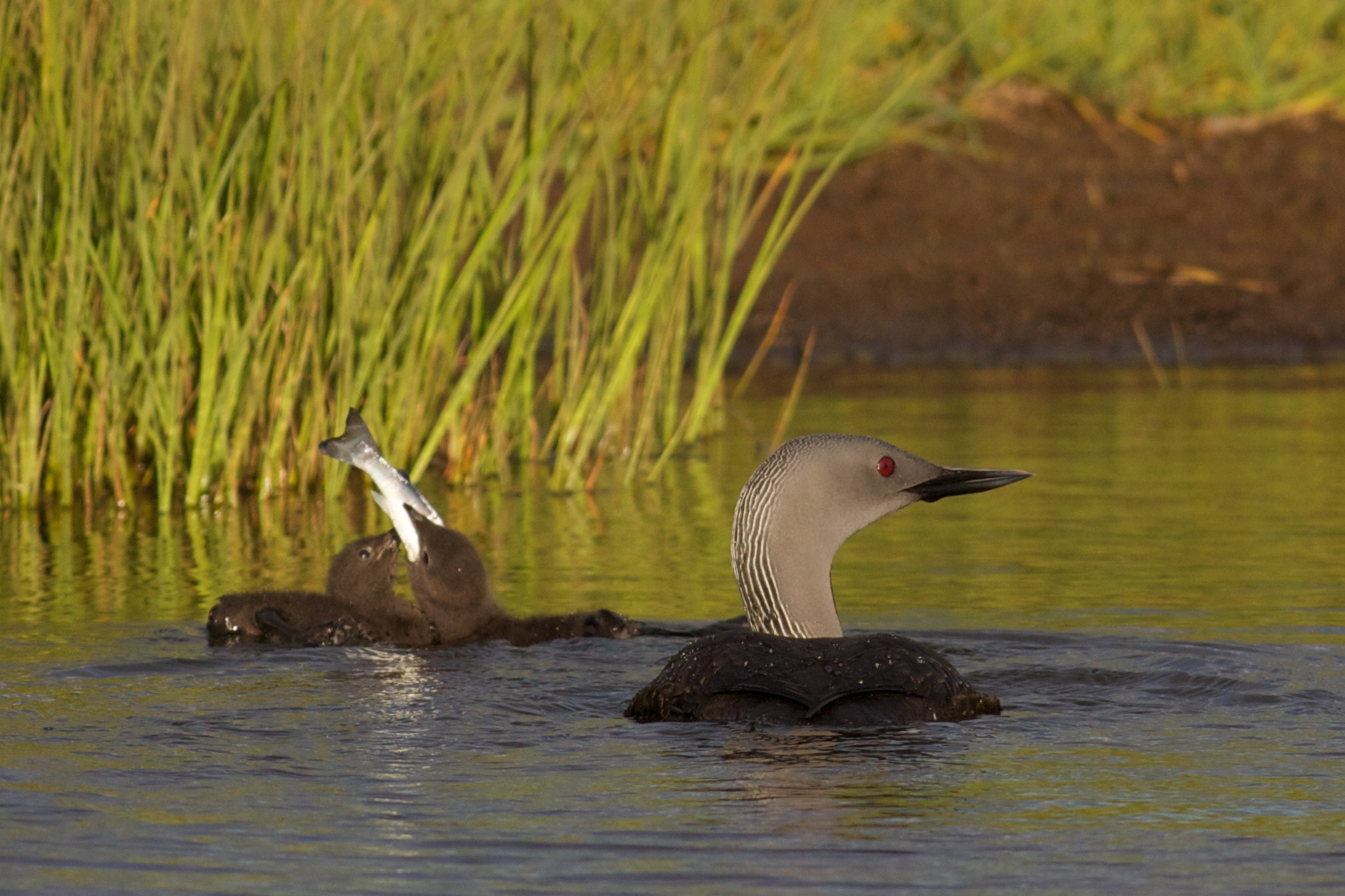
Once they are 3–4 days old, the young are fed fish—which can be quite large compared to the size of the chick.

Like all members of its family, the red-throated loon is primarily a fish-eater, though it sometimes feeds on molluscs, crustaceans, frogs, aquatic invertebrates, insects, fish spawn or even plant material. It seizes rather than spears its prey, which is generally captured underwater. Though it normally dives and swims using only its feet for propulsion, it may use its wings as well if it needs to turn or accelerate quickly. Pursuit dives range from 2–9 m (6.6–29.5 ft) in depth, with an average underwater time of about a minute. Its fish diet increases the red-throated loon's vulnerability to persistent organic pollutants and heavy metals, both of which bioaccumulate, thus potentially causing greater problems for long-lived species (such as the loon) at or near the top of the food chain. Its main diet has also led to several of the loon's British folk names, including "sprat borer" and "spratoon".

For the first few days after hatching, young red-throated loons are fed aquatic insects and small crustaceans by both parents. After 3–4 days, the parents switch to fish small enough for the young birds to swallow whole. By four weeks of age, the young can eat the same food—of the same size—as their parents do. Young birds may be fed for some time after fledging; adults have been seen feeding fish to juveniles at sea and on inland lakes in the United Kingdom, hundreds of kilometres from any breeding areas.

=== Breeding and survival ===
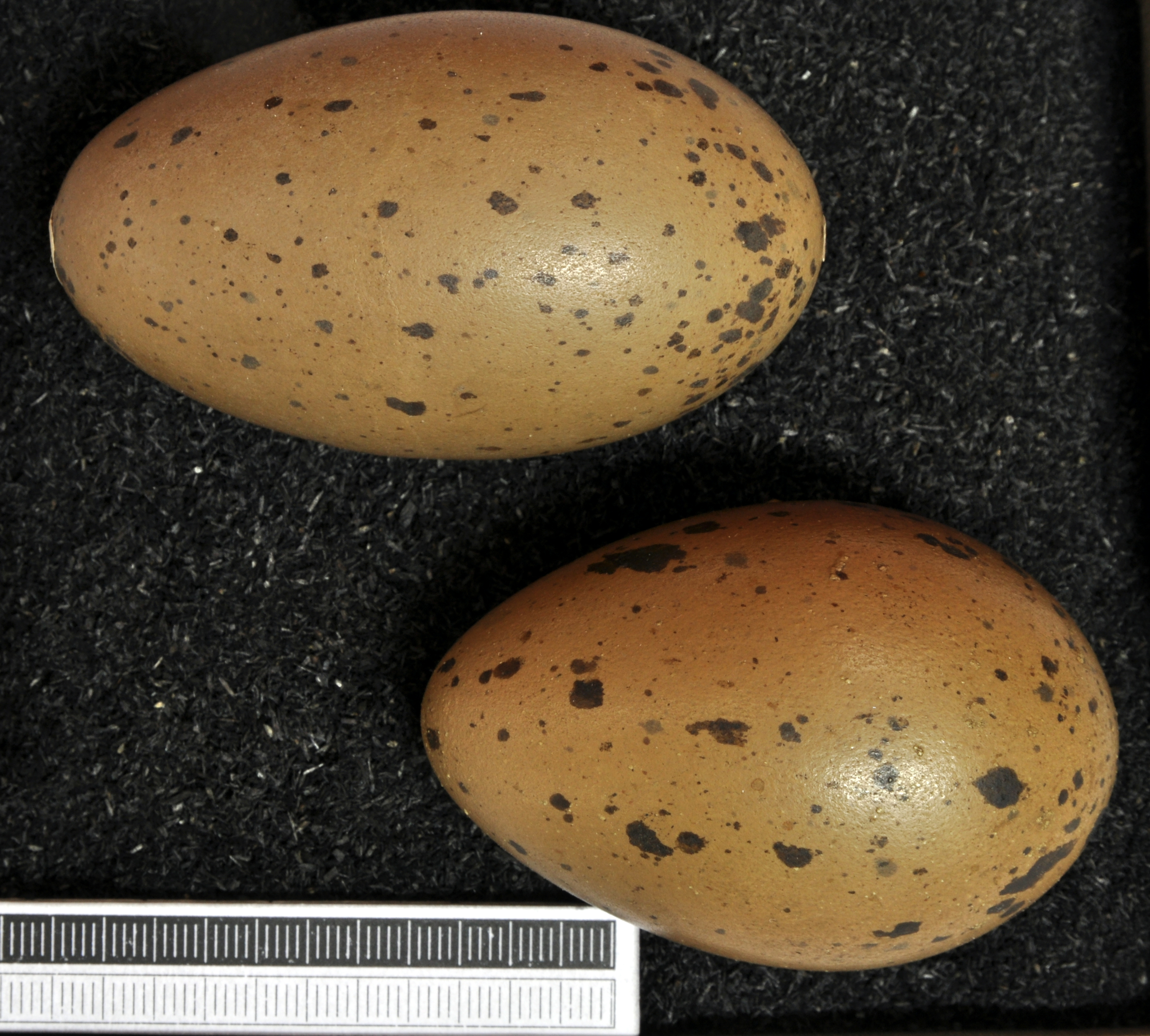
Eggs, Collection Museum Wiesbaden

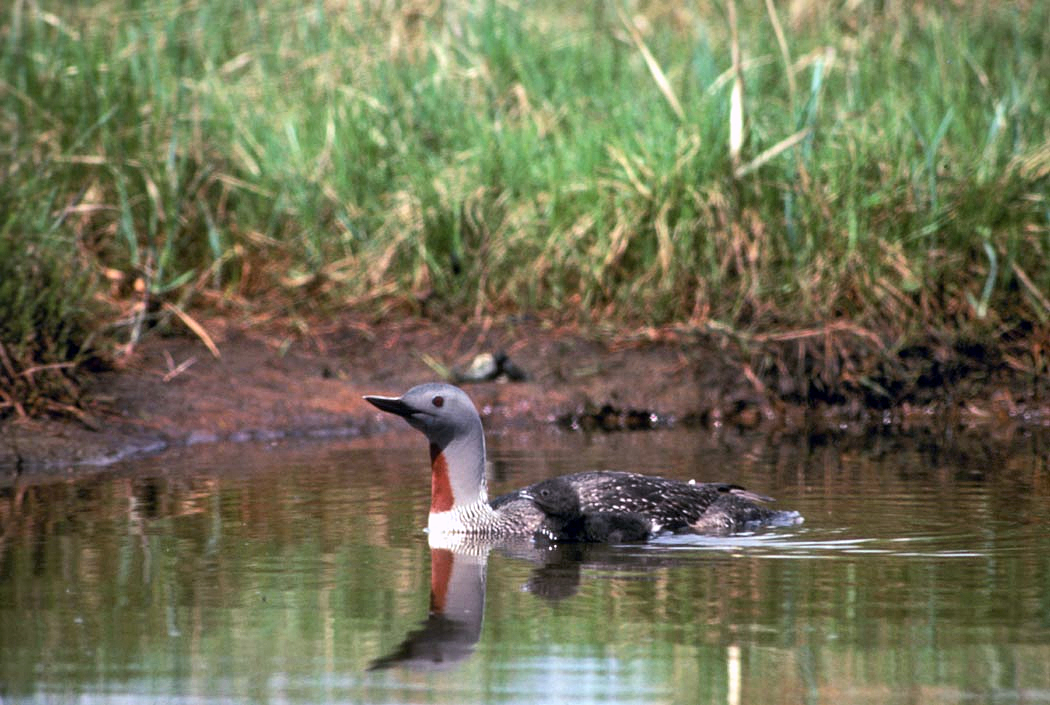
Chicks are competent swimmers, able to accompany their parents soon after hatching.

The red-throated loon is a monogamous species that forms long-term pair bonds. Both sexes build the nest, which is a shallow scrape (or occasionally a platform of mud and vegetation) lined with vegetation and sometimes a few feathers, and placed within a 0.5 metres (20 in) of the edge of a small pond. The female lays two eggs (though clutches of one and three have also been recorded); they are incubated for 24–29 days, primarily by the female. The eggs, which are greenish or olive-brownish spotted with black, measure 75 mm × 46 mm (3.0 in × 1.8 in) and have a mass of 83 g (2.9 oz), of which 8% is shell. Incubation begins as soon as the first egg is laid, so they hatch asynchronously. If a clutch is lost (to predation or flooding, for example) before the young hatch, the red-throated loon usually lays a second clutch, generally in a new nest. The young birds are precocial: upon hatching, they are downy and mobile, with open eyes. Both parents feed them small aquatic invertebrates initially, then small fish for 38–48 days. Parents will perform distraction displays to lure predators away from the nest and young. Ornithologists disagree as to whether adults carry young on their backs while swimming, with some maintaining that they do and others the opposite.

In the wild, the oldest known red-throated loon lived for more than two decades. It was found, oiled and dead, on a beach in Sweden 23 years and 7 months after it had been ringed (banded).

== Conservation status and threats ==
Although the red-throated loon is not a globally threatened species, as it has a large population and a significant range, some populations appear to be declining. Numbers counted in U.S. Fish and Wildlife Service surveys in Alaska show a 53% population decline between 1971 and 1993, for example, and survey count numbers have dropped in continental Europe as well. In Scotland, on the other hand, the population increased by some 16% between 1994 and 2006, according to surveys done by the Royal Society for the Protection of Birds and Scottish Natural Heritage. In 2015, Wetlands International estimated a global population of 200,000 to 600,000 individuals; global population is decreasing as of 2018.

The red-throated loon is one of the species to which the Agreement on the Conservation of African-Eurasian Migratory Waterbirds (AEWA) applies; in the Americas, it is protected by the Migratory Bird Treaty Act of 1918. Oil spills, habitat degradation, and fishing nets are among the main threats this species faces. Because it tends to migrate close to shore—generally within 20 kilometres (12 mi) of land—it may be detrimentally affected by the construction of near-shore wind farms; studies indicate a high level of avoidance of wind farm areas, though deaths due to direct strikes with the turbines appear to be uncommon. High levels of mercury in the environment have led to reproductive failures in some areas, including parts of Sweden. Studies in Sweden have also shown that they may be adversely impacted by the acidification of lakes, as the fish on which they prey are susceptible to low pH.} On the breeding grounds, Arctic and red foxes are major predators of eggs, while great skuas, Arctic skuas and various species of Larus gulls (including great black-backed gulls and glaucous gulls) are predators of both eggs and young.

The species is known to serve as host for at least 51 species of parasites, most of which are roundworms (nematodes), flatworms (digeneans) and tapeworms (cestodes) carried internally; a single species of louse is its only known external parasite. It is also known to sometimes carry significant populations of diatoms (microscopic phytoplankton) on its contour feathers. The red-throated loon is susceptible to avian influenza and Type E botulism, and is regularly killed by the ingestion of neurotoxins produced by "red tide" algal blooms. During a 2007 bloom, large numbers of the birds also died of hypothermia, after their plumages became matted by a protein byproduct of the algae, which reduced the insulating properties of their feathers.

== In human culture ==
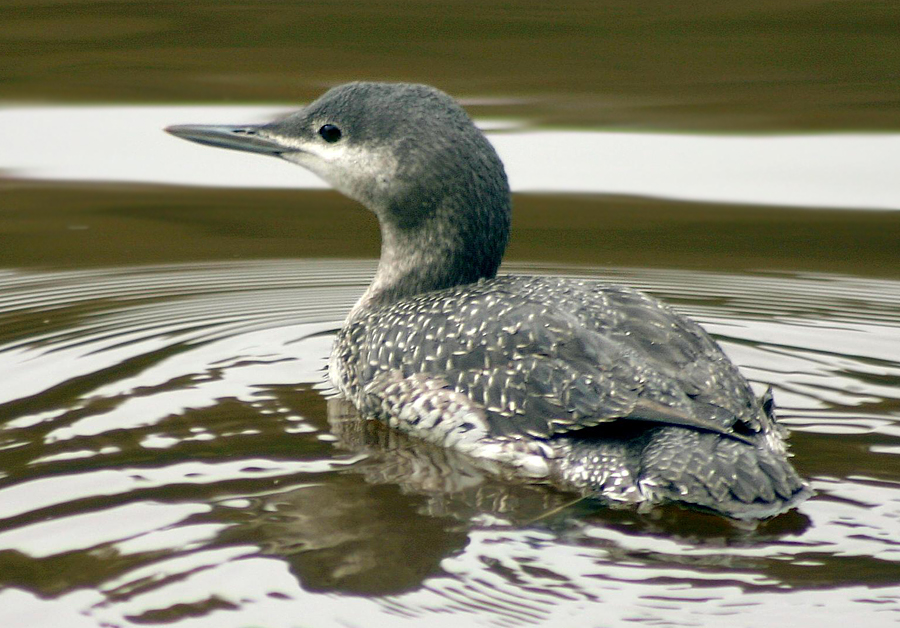
Juveniles have darker necks and fewer speckles on their backs than adults do.

Used as a food source since prehistoric times, the red-throated loon is still hunted by indigenous peoples in some parts of the world today. Eggs as well as birds are taken, sometimes in significant numbers; during one study on northern Canada's Igloolik Island, 73% of all red-throated loon eggs laid within the 10 km^{2} (3.9 sq mi) study site over two breeding seasons were collected by indigenous inhabitants of the island. In some parts of Russia, red-throated loon skins were traditionally used to make caps and various clothing decorations, including collars. The species was also central to the creation mythologies of indigenous groups throughout the Holarctic. According to the myth—which varies only slightly between versions, despite the sometimes-vast distances that separated the groups who believed it—the loon was asked by a great shaman to bring up earth from the bottom of the sea. That earth was then used to build the world's dry land.

As recently as the 1800s, the behaviour of the red-throated loon was used to forecast the weather; according to the conventional wisdom of the time, birds flying inland or giving short cries predicted good weather, while those flying out to sea or giving long, wailing cries predicted rain. In the Orkney and Shetland islands of Scotland, the species is still known as the "rain goose" in deference to its supposed weather-predicting capabilities. The people of the Faroe Islands believed that if the red-throated loon miaowed like a cat, then rain was imminent, while a call of gaa-gaa-gaa or turkatrae-turkatrae predicted fine weather.

Bhutan, Japan, Åland (an autonomous region of Finland), and the Union of the Comoros have issued stamps featuring the red-throated loon.
