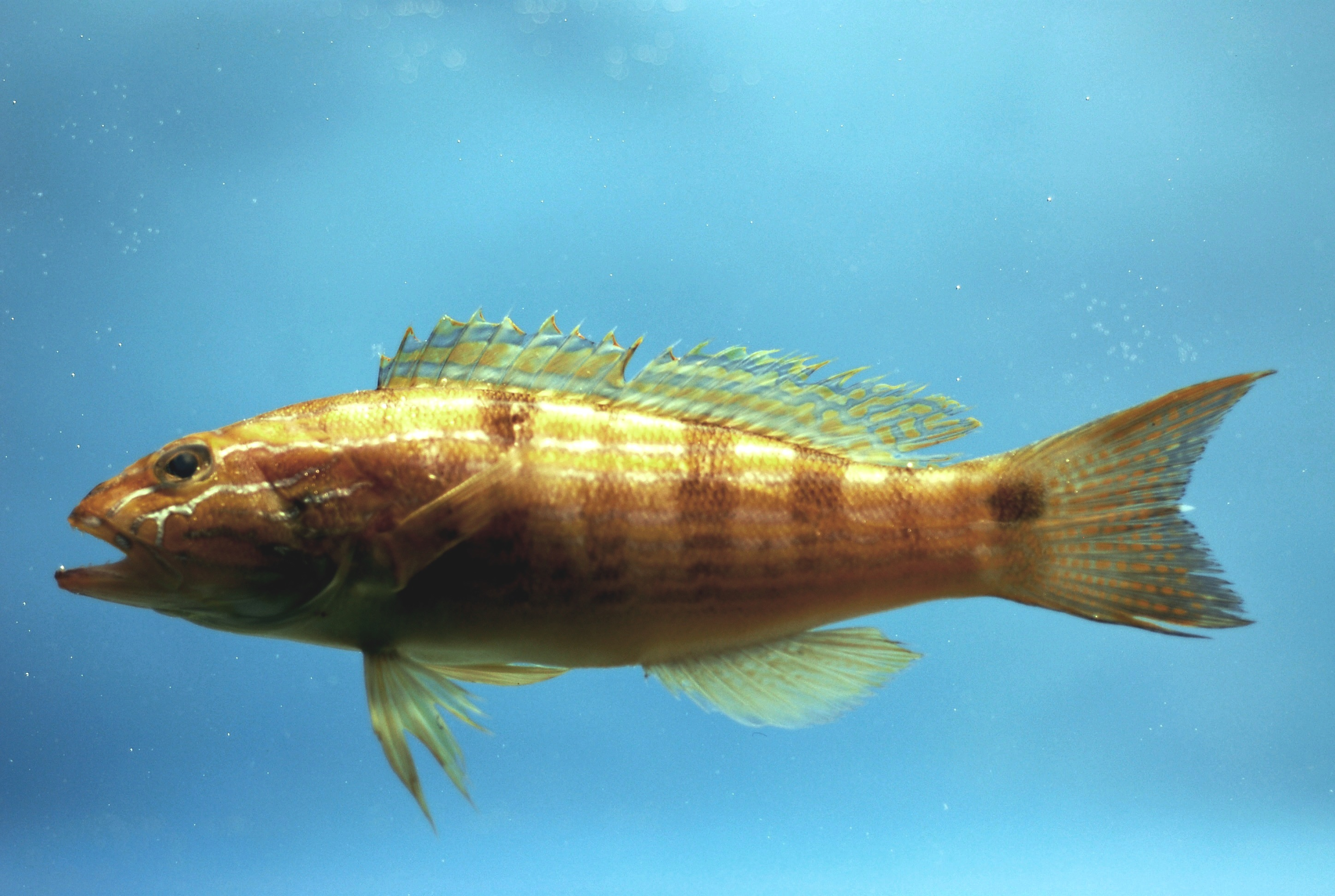
- Diplectrum formosum

Scientific classification
- Kingdom: Animalia
- Phylum: Chordata
- Class: Actinopterygii
- Order: Perciformes
- Family: Serranidae
- Genus: Diplectrum; Holbrook, 1855

Type species
- Serranus fascicularis Valenciennes, 1828

Synonyms
- Haliperca Gill, 1862; Paraserranus Bleeker 1874

= Diplectrum =

Genus of fishes

Diplectrum, commonly known as sand perches, is a genus of marine ray-finned fishes which is a member of the subfamily Serraninae of the family Serranidae, which includes the groupers and anthias.

== Distribution ==
There are 12 species distributed in the western Atlantic Ocean and the eastern Pacific Ocean.

== Species ==
The following species are classified under the genus Diplectrum:

- Diplectrum bivittatum (Valenciennes, 1828) (Dwarf sand perch)
- Diplectrum conceptione (Valenciennes, 1828) (Yellowmouth sand-perch)
- Diplectrum eumelum Rosenblatt & Johnson, 1974 (Orange-spotted sand perch)
- Diplectrum euryplectrum D.S. Jordan & Bollman, 1890 (Bighead sand perch)
- Diplectrum formosum (Linnaeus, 1766) (Sand perch)
- Diplectrum labarum Rosenblatt & Johnson, 1974 (Highfin sand perch)
- Diplectrum macropoma (Günther, 1864) (Mexican sand perch)
- Diplectrum maximum Hildebrand, 1946 (Torpedo sand perch)
- Diplectrum pacificum Meek & Hildebrand, 1925 (Inshore sand perch)
- Diplectrum radiale (Quoy & Gaimard, 1824) (Pond perch)
- Diplectrum rostrum Bortone, 1974 (Bridled sand perch)
- Diplectrum sciurus Gilbert, 1892 (Gulf squirrelfish)
