= Croatan Formation =

Geological formation

- Stratigraphic range: Neogene
- Type: Formation

Location
- Region: North Carolina
- Country: United States

The Croatan Formation is a geologic formation in North Carolina. It preserves fossils dating back to the Neogene period.

== See also ==
- List of fossiliferous stratigraphic units in North Carolina
