= Charles Henry Gilbert =

American ichthyologist (1859–1928)

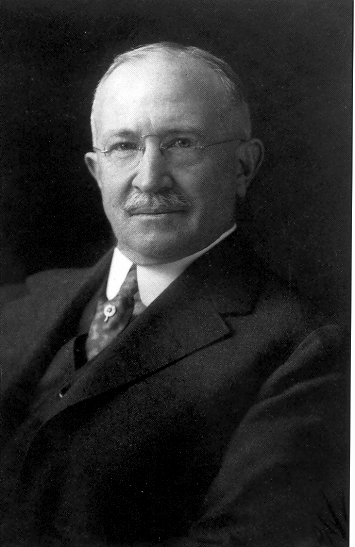
- Charles Henry Gilbert, about 1920
- Born: December 5, 1859; Rockford, Illinois, US
- Died: April 20, 1928 (aged 68); Palo Alto, California, US
- Education: Butler University; Indiana University
- Scientific career
- Fields: Ichthyology
- Workplaces: U.S. Fish Commission; University of Cincinnati; Indiana University; Stanford University
- Doctoral advisor: David Starr Jordan
- Doctoral students: Joseph Grinnell; Carl Leavitt Hubbs; William Francis Thompson

Charles Henry Gilbert (December 5, 1859 in Rockford, Illinois – April 20, 1928 in Palo Alto, California) was a pioneer ichthyologist and fishery biologist of particular significance to natural history of the western United States. He collected and studied fishes from Central America north to Alaska and described many new species. Later he became an expert on Pacific salmon and was a noted conservationist of the Pacific Northwest. He is considered by many as the intellectual founder of American fisheries biology. He was one of the 22 "pioneer professors" (founding faculty) of Stanford University.

== Early life and education ==
Born in Rockford, Illinois, Gilbert spent his early years in Indianapolis, Indiana, where he came under the influence of his high school teacher, David Starr Jordan (1851‒1931). When Jordan became Professor of Natural History at Butler University in Indianapolis, Gilbert followed and received his B.A. degree in 1879. Jordan moved to Indiana University, in Bloomington, in the fall of 1879, and Gilbert again followed, receiving his M.S. degree in 1882 and Ph.D. in 1883. His doctorate was the first such degree ever awarded by Indiana University.

== Personal life ==
Little is known about Gilbert's personal life. His wife, Julia Ringold Hughes (born December 6, 1849, Bloomington, Indiana) was a student at Indiana University and became superintendent of high schools in Bloomington. She died in California on November 30, 1916. There were three children, Carl (1891‒1963), Winnifred (Mrs. Carl F. Braun, 1886‒1980), and Ruth (Mrs. Percy R. Baker, 1885‒1982), all of whom graduated from Stanford University.

== Early and mid-career ==
Jordan and Gilbert, along with other students forming the so-called "Jordan School of Ichthyology", explored the streams and rivers of Indiana and the southeastern United States in the late 1870s, describing a number of new fishes. In 1879, Jordan was asked by Spencer Fullerton Baird (1823‒1887), Director of the U.S. Fish Commission, to undertake a survey of the fisheries of the Pacific Coast of the United States. Jordan took leave of absence from Indiana University, chose Gilbert as his assistant, and headed west to San Francisco in December 1879. Their one-year pioneering survey of fishes of the West, from Southern California to Vancouver Island, British Columbia, laid the foundation for nearly 50 years of study of Pacific fishes and fisheries by the team of Jordan and Gilbert.

By the time Gilbert received his doctoral degree at the age of 24, he was the author or co-author (mostly with Jordan) of over 80 scientific publications. Gilbert served at Indiana University from 1880‒1884, first as instructor, then as Assistant Professor in Natural Sciences and Modern Languages. In 1884, he accepted the Professorship of Natural History at the University of Cincinnati, in Ohio, remaining there until December 1888. In 1889, Gilbert returned to Indiana University as Professor of Natural History.

Jordan became President of Indiana University in 1885. However, in 1890, U.S. Senator Leland Stanford (1824‒1893) and his wife Jane Eliza Lathrop Stanford (1828‒1905) chose Jordan to be the founding president of a new university to be established in Palo Alto, California, in memory of their deceased son, Leland Stanford, Jr. (1868‒1884). Among Jordan’s first appointments to the new faculty was Charles Henry Gilbert as the Chairman of the Zoology Department.

== Career at Stanford University ==
At Stanford University, Gilbert began a career that spanned nearly 37 years. He concentrated on Pacific fish, mostly marine, and participated in numerous expeditions aboard the U.S. Fish Commission Steamer Albatross. These cruises included three to Alaska, two off California, and one each to the Hawaiian Islands and the Japanese archipelago. As a pioneer descriptive ichthyologist, Gilbert described either alone or with others about 117 new genera and 620 species of fishes. He published about 172 papers on fishes.

Around 1909, Gilbert turned his attention to the study of Pacific salmon and soon became the foremost expert on these economically important fish. He studied salmon from California to Alaska, but concentrated his efforts in British Columbia (from about 1912‒1921) and in Alaska (from 1918‒1927). He was the first to correctly apply the scale method to aging of Pacific salmon, he pioneered racial studies of salmon using scales, and he was instrumental in establishing tagging programs on salmon in Alaska. He was the first to confirm the "home stream" theory to spawning salmon. Additionally, he was also one of the first scientists to consider the population dynamics of northwest stocks of salmon.

In his later years, Gilbert became an outspoken champion of the need for conservation of Pacific salmon resources, warning all who would listen that this resource was in dire jeopardy unless over-fishing was curtailed. His world view was far ahead of his time and he urged the U.S. Bureau of Fisheries to instigate data collection programs for Alaska salmon.

Always formal and proper, Gilbert nevertheless was a demanding person with a sharp eye and an even sharper temper. He supervised the graduate studies of several ichthyologists and fishery biologists who became notable in their field, among them William Francis Thompson (1888‒1965) and Carl Leavitt Hubbs (1894‒1979).

== Legacy ==
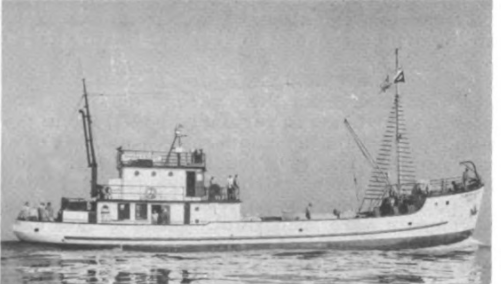
US FWS Charles H. Gilbert in the 1950s.

Gilbert died in 1928 at the age of 68, but he is remembered and honored by ichthyologists and fishery biologists around the world for his many contributions. The Gilbert Fisheries Society was established in 1931 at the College of Fisheries, University of Washington (UW). The organization was short-lived, however, and the society was reconstituted in 1989 as the Gilbert Ichthyological Society. A United States Fish and Wildlife Service fisheries research vessel in commission from 1952 to 1973 was named US FWS Charles H. Gilbert and a building at Stanford University is named the Charles H. Gilbert Biological Sciences Building.

In 1998, the UW School of Fisheries (now the School of Aquatic and Fishery Sciences) was the recipient of the "Dorothy T. Gilbert Endowed Ichthyology Research Fund," established by Dorothy Thomlinson Gilbert (1929‒2008), the wife of William W. Gilbert, the late grandson of Charles Henry. In 2008, the Dorothy T. Gilbert Endowed Professorship was established in the UW College of Ocean and Fisheries Science (now the College of the Environment) with the initial occupant of that position being the distinguished UW ichthyologist, Theodore Wells Pietsch III (1945‒ ).

Gilbert is commemorated in the scientific names of three species of lizards: Phyllodactylus gilberti, Plestiodon gilberti, and Xantusia gilberti.

The Gilbert's garden eel Ariosoma gilberti was named by James Douglas Ogilby.

Cilus gilberti was named by Charles Conrad Abbott in honor of "friend and instructor" Charles Henry Gilbert, to whom Abbott’s "interest in ichthyology is wholly due".
