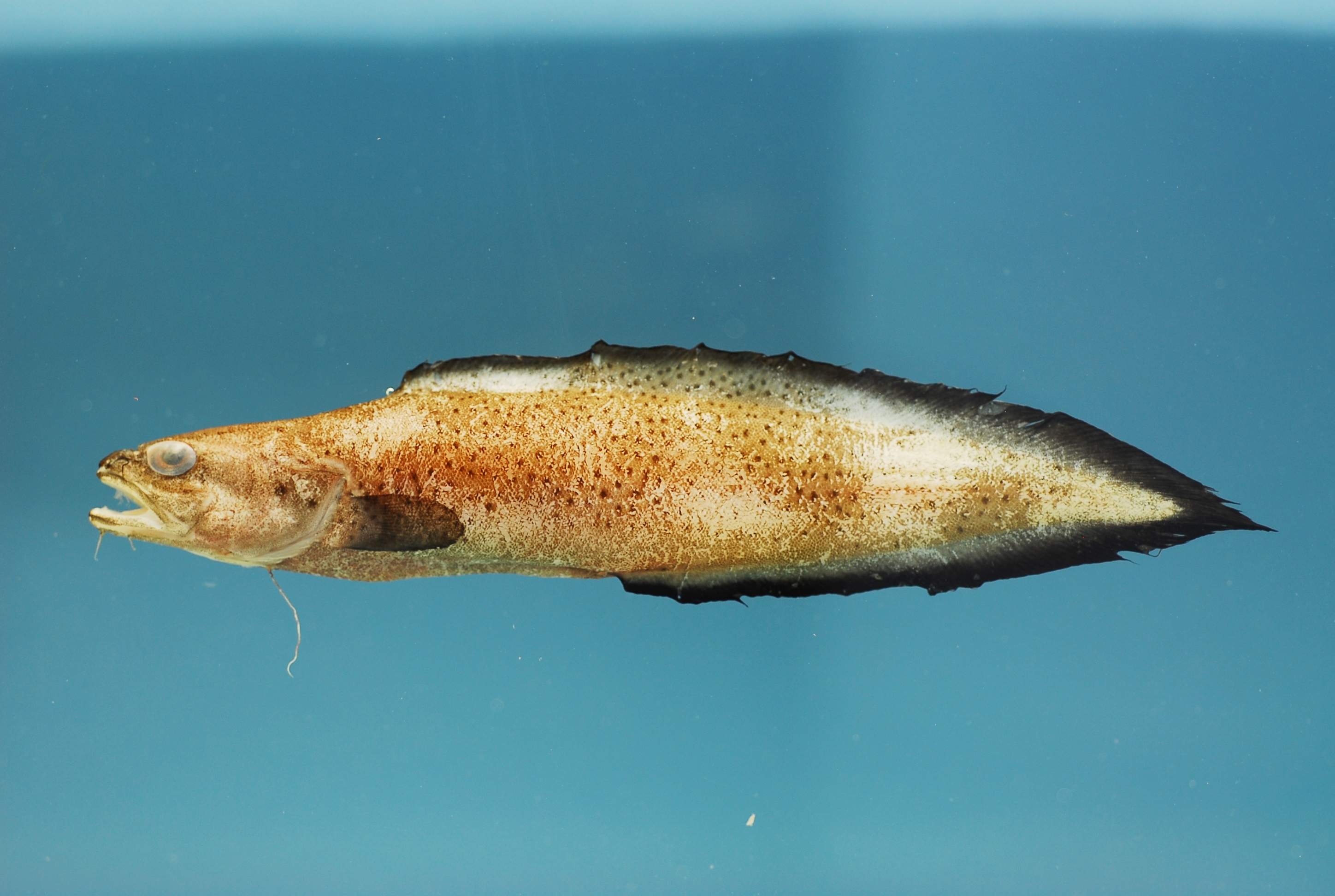
- Bearded brotula (B. barbata)
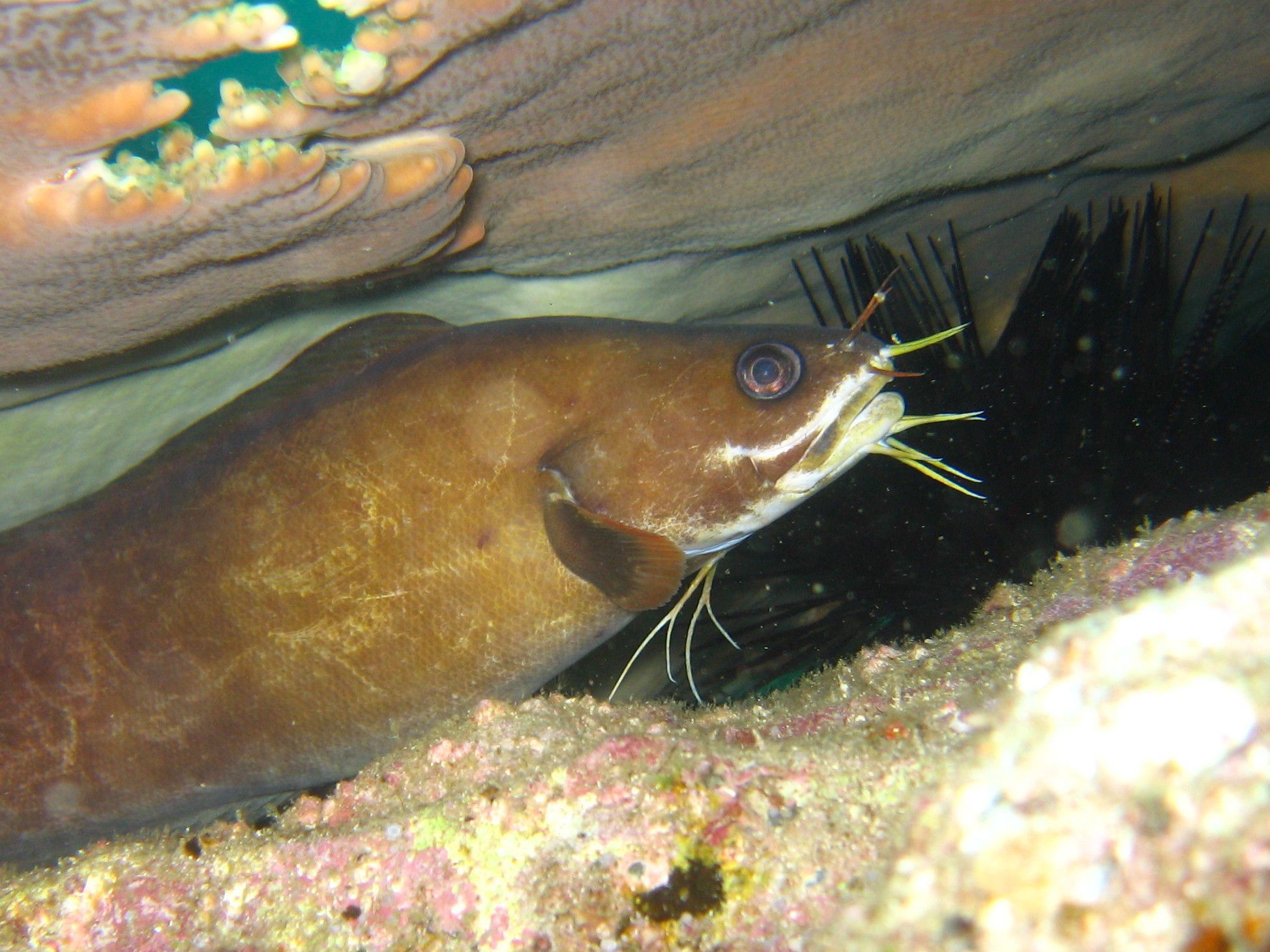
- Goatsbeard brotula (B. multibarbata)

Scientific classification
- Kingdom: Animalia
- Phylum: Chordata
- Class: Actinopterygii
- Order: Ophidiiformes
- Suborder: Ophidioidei
- Subfamily: Brotulidae; Swainson, 1838
- Genus: Brotula; G. Cuvier, 1829

Type species
- Enchelyopus barbatus Bloch & Schneider, 1801

Species
- 6 species (see text)

= Brotula (genus) =

Genus of fishes

Brotula, also known as bearded cusk-eels, is a genus of ophidiiform fish. It is the only genus in the family Brotulidae, formerly considered a subfamily of Ophidiidae.

== Species ==
There are currently six recognized species in this genus:

- Brotula barbata (Bloch & J. G. Schneider, 1801) (Bearded brotula)
- Brotula clarkae C. L. Hubbs, 1944 (Pacific bearded brotula)
- Brotula flaviviridis D. W. Greenfield, 2005
- Brotula multibarbata Temminck & Schlegel, 1846 (Goatsbeard brotula)
- Brotula ordwayi Hildebrand & F. O. Barton, 1949 (Ordway's brotula)
- Brotula townsendi Fowler, 1900 (Townsend's cusk eel)
