= Pacific bearded brotula =

Conservation status
- Data Deficient (IUCN 3.1)

Scientific classification
- Kingdom: Animalia
- Phylum: Chordata
- Class: Actinopterygii
- Order: Ophidiiformes
- Genus: Brotula
- Species: B. clarkae

Binomial name
- Brotula clarkae Hubbs, 1944

Synonyms
- Brotula clarki Hubbs, 1944

Species of fish

The Pacific bearded brotula (Brotula clarkae) also known as the pink bearded cusk-eel or the red bearded cusk-eel is a species of cusk eel found in the Pacific Ocean. It is described as being reddish-brown with dark fins.

== Description ==
It averages around 45 cm (18 in), the largest specimen measured 115 cm (45 in). It contains around 108–118 dorsal soft rays, 27–28 pectoral rays and 78–89 analsoft rays. They also have 55–56 vertebrae.

== Distribution and habitat ==
The Pacific bearded brotula is widespread in the eastern Pacific Ocean, ranging from the Gulf of California in the north to northern Peru in the south. This range includes the eastern coasts of Colombia, Costa Rica, Ecuador, El Salvador, Guatemala, Honduras, Mexico, Nicaragua, Panama, Peru, and southern California, United States. Mature fish are benthopelagic and may be found at depths of up to 650 m (2,130 ft) below the surface, however, they are most commonly found in the range of 40–75 m (131–246 ft). Juveniles are commonly found on reefs.

== Behaviour ==
They are oviparous and characterized by larvae in midwater that are late post-flexion and transition stage.
