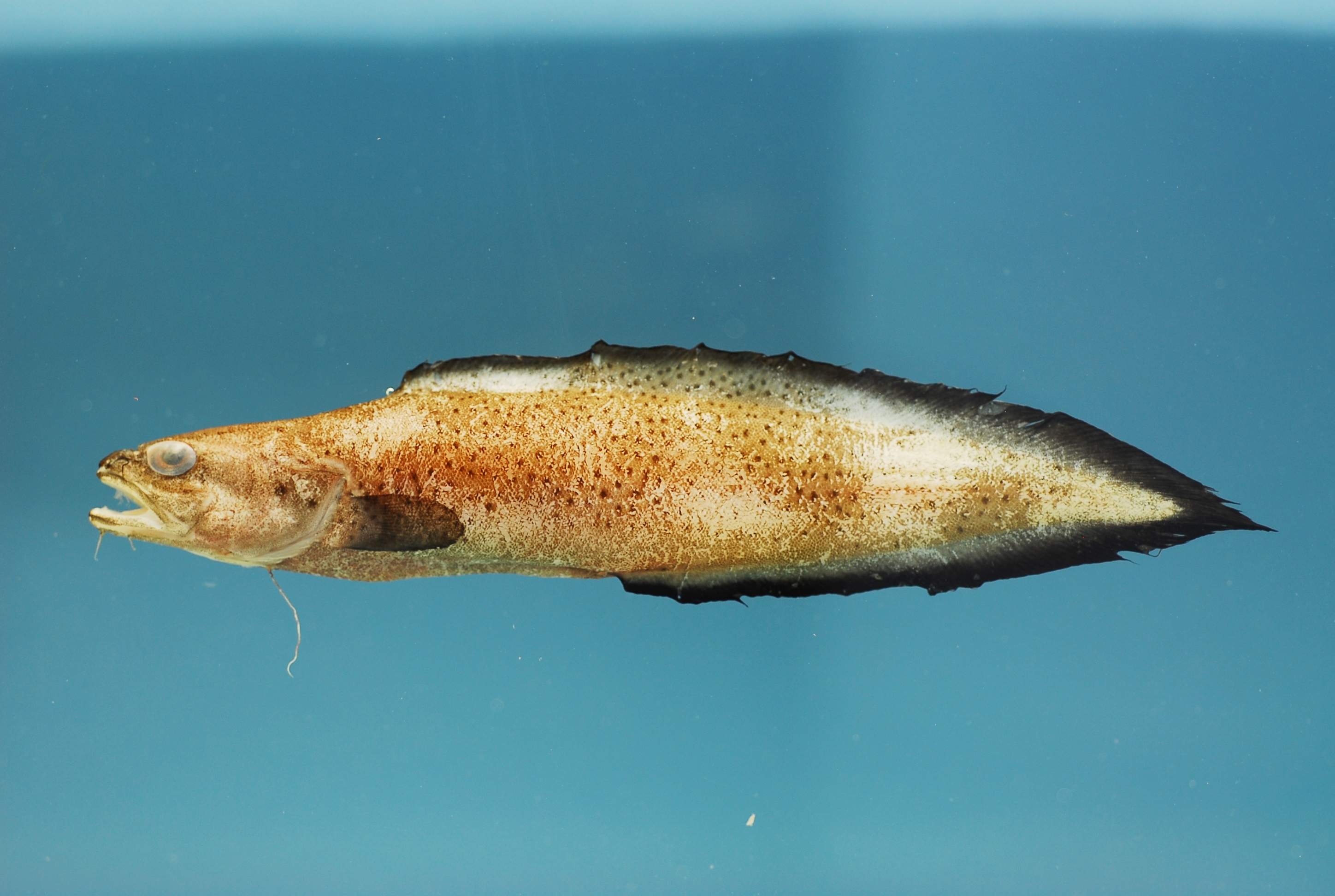
- Swimming

Conservation status
- Least Concern (IUCN 3.1)

Scientific classification
- Kingdom: Animalia
- Phylum: Chordata
- Class: Actinopterygii
- Order: Ophidiiformes
- Genus: Brotula
- Species: B. barbata

Binomial name
- Brotula barbata (Bloch & Schneider, 1801)

Synonyms
- Enchelyopus barbatus Bloch & Schneider, 1801

= Brotula barbata =

Species of fish

Brotula barbata, commonly known as the bearded brotula, Atlantic bearded brotula, or sugarfish, is a species of cusk-eel in the genus Brotula. It lives in the Atlantic Ocean, in depths of up to 300 meters. Its coloring ranges from olive-brown to red-brown, and it grows up to be around 50 centimeters. It has a carnivorous diet, and it is oviparous.

== Description ==
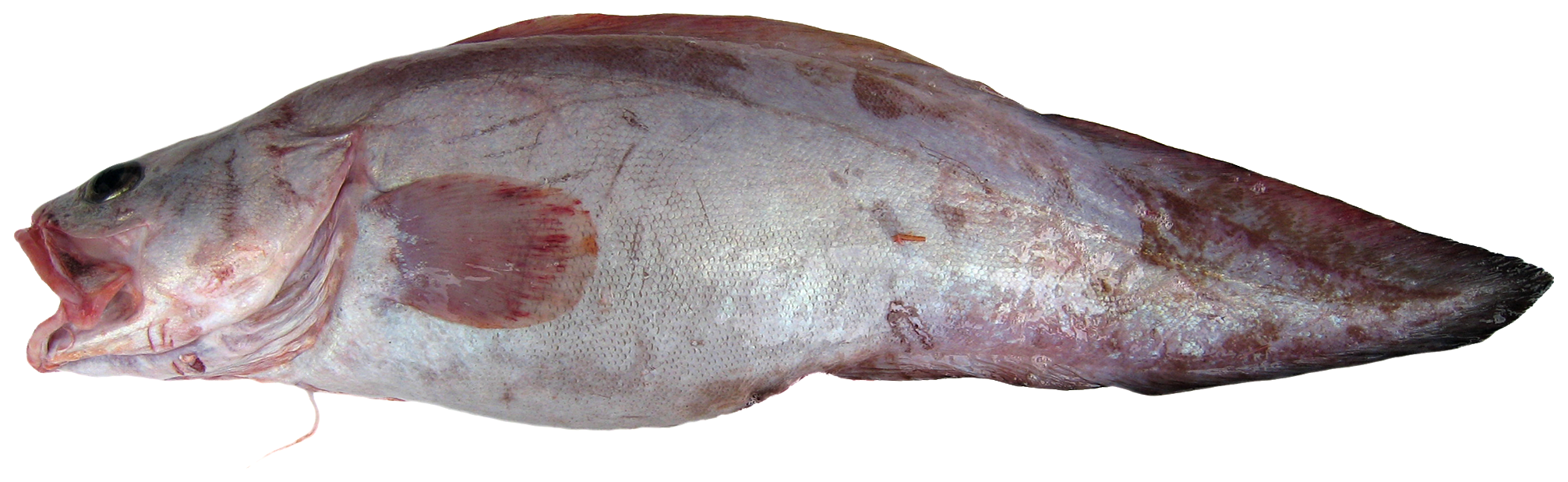
A large specimen, 62.8 cm long

Brotula barbata most commonly grows up to 50 centimeters long, but has been known to grow up to nearly 100 cm. The highest published weight of a specimen was 8.5 kilograms. The front of its body is somewhat deep, tapering to its rear. Its scales are smooth and relatively small, and cover its entire body. It contains 12 barbels: six on its snout and six on its chin. It has a pointed caudal fin (tail fin).

Brotula barbata will sometimes have spots or freckles. It usually is brownish in color overall, with some individuals being closer to olive and others closer to red.

== Ecology and biology ==
Brotula barbata is carnivorous. It mostly feeds on bony fishes and crustaceans that live in shallow waters, including crabs and shrimp. It exhibits oviparity, and lays a large amount of eggs at a time, which are gelatin-like in consistency. The species's larvae are pelagic.

Brotula barbata is exclusive to marine environments. It can live up to a depth of 650 meters, but it most commonly occurs in depths from 50 – 300 m. Adults are benthopelagic, mostly inhabiting the sandy and muddy ocean floor. Juveniles usually inhabit shallow coral reefs instead.

== Distribution and conservation ==
Brotula barbata lives in various areas of the Atlantic Ocean, in tropical and sub-tropical climates. Specifically, it occurs on the east coast of North and South America, from North Carolina down to Brazil, as well as on the west coast of Africa, from Mauritania to Angola. It is a common species throughout its range. Although it is sometimes a bycatch in fisheries, there are no major threats to the species, and it is therefore listed as "Least Concern" by IUCN.
